= List of Social Democratic Party (Finland) conventions =

This is a list of Social Democratic Party conventions. Social Democratic Party was founded in 1899 as the name of Labour Party of Finland until 1903. There has been 38 party conventions plus 7 extra conventions.

== Puoluekokoukset 1899–2016 ==
| Rank | Date | Place | Leadership | | | | |
| Rank | Date | Place | Chairman | Deputy chairman/: 1. Deputy chairman | 2. Deputy chairman | 3. Deputy chairman | Secretary/ Party Secretary |
|---|---|---|---|---|---|---|---|
| Founding convention | 17–20 July 1899 | Turku | Nils Robert af Ursin | | | | J. K. Kari |
| 1. | 17–20 July 1901 | Viipuri | K. F. Hellsten | | | | J. K. Kari |
| 2. | 17–20 August 1903 | Forssa | Taavi Tainio | Seth Heikkilä | | | J. K. Kari |
| 3. | 25–28 September 1904 | Helsinki | Taavi Tainio | Seth Heikkilä | | | J. K. Kari |
| 4. | 20–22 November 1905 | Tampere | Emil Perttilä | Matti Paasivuori | | | Matti Turkia |
| 5. | 20–27 August 1906 | Oulu | Edvard Valpas | Aleksanteri Järvenpää | | | Matti Turkia |
| 6. | 8–13 September 1909 | Kotka | Matti Paasivuori | Yrjö Sirola | | | Matti Turkia |
| 7. | 4–10 September 1911 | Helsinki | Otto Wille Kuusinen | Matti Paasivuori | | | Matti Turkia |
| 8. | 26 October − 1 November 1913 | Tampere | Matti Paasivuori | J. Pietikäinen | | | Matti Turkia |
| 9. | 15–18 June 1917 | Helsinki | Kullervo Manner | Edvard Gylling | | | Matti Turkia |
| 10. | 25–27 November 1917 | Helsinki | Kullervo Manner | Edvard Gylling | | | Matti Turkia |
| Extra convention | 5 November 1918 | Helsinki | Väinö Tanner | Matti Paasivuori | | | Väinö Hupli |
| 11. | 27–29 December 1918 | Helsinki | Väinö Tanner | Matti Paasivuori | | | Taavi Tainio |
| 12. | 8–16 December 1919 | Helsinki | Väinö Tanner | Väinö Salovaara | | | Taavi Tainio |
| 13. | 31.3.–4 April 1922 | Helsinki | Väinö Tanner | J. F. Aalto | | | Taavi Tainio |
| 14. | 1–6 February 1926 | Helsinki | Matti Paasivuori | Rieti Itkonen | | | Karl H. Wiik |
| 15. | 26 January − 1 February 1930 | Helsinki | Kaarlo Harvala | Matti Paasivuori | | | Karl H. Wiik |
| 16. | 25–28 May 1933 | Tampere | Kaarlo Harvala | Matti Paasivuori | | | Karl H. Wiik |
| 17. | 25–28 May 1936 | Helsinki | Kaarlo Harvala | Edvard Huttunen | | | Aleksi Aaltonen |
| 18. | 18–20 May 1939 | Turku | Kaarlo Harvala | Väinö Salovaara | | | Aleksi Aaltonen |
| 19. | 25–29 November 1944 | Helsinki | Onni Hiltunen | Aleksi Aaltonen | | | Unto Varjonen |
| 20. | 15–17 June 1946 | Helsinki | Emil Skog | Aleksi Aaltonen | | | Väinö Leskinen |
| 21. | 30 October − 3 November 1949 | Helsinki | Emil Skog | Aleksi Aaltonen | | | Väinö Leskinen |
| 22. | 22.–24 May 1952 | Helsinki | Emil Skog | Matti Lepistö | | | Väinö Leskinen |
| 23. | 3.–6 June 1955 | Helsinki | Emil Skog | Eero Antikainen, Tyyne Leivo-Larsson | | | Väinö Leskinen |
| 24. | 21.–24 April 1957 | Helsinki | Väinö Tanner | Olavi Lindblom, Onni Hiltunen | | | Kaarlo Pitsinki |
| 25. | 16.–18 April 1960 | Helsinki | Väinö Tanner | Olavi Lindblom | | | Kaarlo Pitsinki |
| 26. | 15.–17 June 1963 | Helsinki | Rafael Paasio | Olavi Lindblom | | | Kaarlo Pitsinki |
| 27. | 26.–28 November 1966 | Helsinki | Rafael Paasio | Olavi Lindblom | | | Erkki Raatikainen |
| 28. | 6.–9 June 1969 | Turku | Rafael Paasio | Olavi Lindblom | | | Kalevi Sorsa |
| 29. | 1.–4 June 1972 | Tampere | Rafael Paasio | Veikko Helle, Margit Eskman | | | Kalevi Sorsa |
| 30. | 5.–8 June 1975 | Jyväskylä | Kalevi Sorsa | Veikko Helle, Pirkko Työläjärvi | | | Ulf Sundqvist |
| 31. | 8.–11 June 1978 | Espoo | Kalevi Sorsa | Veikko Helle, Pirkko Työläjärvi | | | Ulf Sundqvist |
| 32. | 3.–7 June 1981 | Pori | Kalevi Sorsa | Veikko Helle, Pirkko Työläjärvi | | | Erkki Liikanen |
| 33. | 6.–10 June 1984 | Lahti | Kalevi Sorsa | Pirkko Työläjärvi, Matti Ahde | | | Erkki Liikanen |
| 34. | 4.–7 June 1987 | Helsinki | Pertti Paasio | Matti Ahde, Pirjo Ala-Kapee | | | Ulpu Iivari |
| 35. | 6.–10 June 1990 | Lappeenranta | Pertti Paasio | Matti Puhakka | Tarja Filatov | Tuulikki Hämäläinen | Ulpu Iivari |
| Extra convention | 16.–17 November 1991 | Helsinki | Ulf Sundqvist | Antero Kekkonen | Tarja Tenkula | Matti Puhakka | Markku Hyvärinen |
| 36. | 3.–6 June 1993 | Helsinki | Paavo Lipponen | Antero Kekkonen | Liisa Jaakonsaari | | Markku Hyvärinen |
| 37. | 6.–9 June 1996 | Helsinki | Paavo Lipponen | Antero Kekkonen | Liisa Jaakonsaari | | Kari Laitinen |
| 38. | 26.–30 May 1999 | Turku | Paavo Lipponen | Antero Kekkonen | Säde Tahvanainen | | Kari Laitinen |
| 39. | 6.–8 June 2002 | Tampere | Paavo Lipponen | Tarja Filatov | Säde Tahvanainen | | Eero Heinäluoma |
| 40. | 9.–11 June 2005 | Jyväskylä | Eero Heinäluoma | Pia Viitanen | Tarja Filatov | | Maarit Feldt-Ranta |
| 41. | 5.–7 June 2008 | Hämeenlinna | Jutta Urpilainen | Ilkka Kantola | Maria Guzenina-Richardson | Pia Viitanen | Ari Korhonen |
| 42. | 27.–29 May 2010 | Joensuu | Jutta Urpilainen | Maria Guzenina-Richardson | Ilkka Kantola | Pia Viitanen | Mikael Jungner |
| 43. | 24.–26 May 2012 | Helsinki | Jutta Urpilainen | Krista Kiuru | Antti Lindtman | Eero Vainio | Reijo Paananen |
| 44. | 8.–10 May 2014 | Seinäjoki | Antti Rinne | Antti Lindtman | Sanna Marin | Krista Kiuru | Reijo Paananen |
| 45. | 3.-5. February 2017 | Lahti | Antti Rinne | Sanna Marin | Maarit Feldt-Ranta | Ville Skinnari | Antton Rönnholm |
