= Minister of Transport and Communications (Finland) =

Finnish cabinet position

The Minister of Transport and Communications (Finnish: liikenne- ja viestintäministeri, Swedish: kommunikationsminister) is one of the Finnish Government's ministerial positions. The Minister of Transport and Communications heads the Ministry of Transport and Communications.

The incumbent holder of the position is Lulu Ranne of the Finns Party.

== Ministers ==
No.	Portrait	Minister	Took office	Left office	Time in office	Party	Cabinet
1	Paavo Aitio	Paavo Aitio (1918–1989)	1 January 1970	14 May 1970	133 days	SKDL	Koivisto I
2	Martti Niskala	Martti Niskala (1911–1984)	14 May 1970	15 July 1970	62 days	Independent	Aura I
3	Veikko Saarto	Veikko Saarto (born 1934)	15 July 1970	26 March 1971	254 days	SKDL	Karjalainen II
4	Kalervo Haapasalo	Kalervo Haapasalo (1922–2002)	26 March 1971	29 October 1971	217 days	SDP	Karjalainen II
5	Esa Timonen	Esa Timonen (1925–2015)	29 October 1971	23 February 1972	117 days	Independent	Aura II
6	Valde Nevalainen	Valde Nevalainen (1919–1994)	23 February 1972	4 September 1972	194 days	SDP	Paasio II
7	Pekka Tarjanne	Pekka Tarjanne (1937–2010)	4 September 1972	13 June 1975	2 years, 282 days	Liberals	Sorsa I
(5)	Esa Timonen	Esa Timonen (1925–2015)	13 June 1975	30 November 1975	170 days	Independent	Liinamaa
8	Kauko Hjerppe	Kauko Hjerppe (1926–1996)	30 November 1975	29 September 1976	304 days	SKDL	Liinamaa
9	Ragnar Granvik	Ragnar Granvik (1910–1997)	29 September 1976	15 May 1977	228 days	RKP	Miettunen III
10	Veikko Saarto	Veikko Saarto (born 1934)	15 May 1977	19 February 1982	4 years, 280 days	SKDL	Sorsa II; Koivisto II
11	Jarmo Wahlström	Jarmo Wahlström (1938–2013)	19 February 1982	31 December 1982	315 days	SKDL	Sorsa III
12	Reino Breilin	Reino Breilin (1928–2010)	31 December 1982	6 May 1983	126 days	SDP	Sorsa III
13	Matti Puhakka	Matti Puhakka (1945–2021)	6 May 1983	30 November 1984	1 year, 208 days	SDP	Sorsa IV
14	Matti Luttinen	Matti Luttinen (1936–2009)	1 December 1984	30 April 1987	2 years, 150 days	SDP	Sorsa IV
15	Pekka Vennamo	Pekka Vennamo (1944–2026)	30 April 1987	30 September 1989	2 years, 153 days	Rural Party	Holkeri
16	Raimo Vistbacka	Raimo Vistbacka (born 1945)	1 October 1989	28 August 1990	331 days	Rural Party	Holkeri
17	Ilkka Kanerva	Ilkka Kanerva (1948–2022)	28 August 1990	26 April 1991	241 days	National Coalition	Holkeri
18	Ole Norrback	Ole Norrback (born 1941)	26 April 1991	13 April 1995	3 years, 352 days	RKP	Aho
19	Tuula Linnainmaa	Tuula Linnainmaa (born 1942)	13 April 1995	1 April 1997	1 year, 353 days	National Coalition	Lipponen I
20	Matti Aura	Matti Aura (1943–2011)	2 April 1997	15 January 1999	1 year, 288 days	National Coalition	Lipponen I
21	Kimmo Sasi	Kimmo Sasi (1952–2025)	15 January 1999	15 April 1999	90 days	National Coalition	Lipponen I
22	Olli-Pekka Heinonen	Olli-Pekka Heinonen (born 1964)	15 April 1999	4 January 2002	2 years, 264 days	National Coalition	Lipponen II
(21)	Kimmo Sasi	Kimmo Sasi (1952–2025)	4 January 2002	17 April 2003	1 year, 103 days	National Coalition	Lipponen II
23	Leena Luhtanen	Leena Luhtanen (born 1941)	17 April 2003	23 September 2005	2 years, 159 days	SDP	Jäätteenmäki; Vanhanen I
24	Susanna Huovinen	Susanna Huovinen (born 1972)	23 September 2005	19 April 2007	1 year, 208 days	SDP	Vanhanen I
25	Anu Vehviläinen	Anu Vehviläinen (born 1963)	19 April 2007	22 June 2011	4 years, 64 days	Centre	Vanhanen II; Kiviniemi
26	Merja Kyllönen	Merja Kyllönen (born 1977)	22 June 2011	4 April 2014	2 years, 286 days	Left Alliance	Katainen
27	Henna Virkkunen	Henna Virkkunen (born 1972)	4 April 2014	24 June 2014	81 days	National Coalition	Katainen
28	Paula Risikko	Paula Risikko (born 1960)	24 June 2014	29 May 2015	339 days	National Coalition	Stubb
29	Anne Berner	Anne Berner (born 1964)	29 May 2015	29 May 2019	4 years, 0 days	Centre	Sipilä
(25)	Anu Vehviläinen	Anu Vehviläinen (born 1963)	29 May 2019	6 June 2019	8 days	Centre	Sipilä
30	Sanna Marin	Sanna Marin (born 1985)	6 June 2019	10 December 2019	187 days	SDP	Rinne
31	Timo Harakka	Timo Harakka (born 1962)	10 December 2019	20 June 2023	3 years, 192 days	SDP	Marin
32	Lulu Ranne	Lulu Ranne (born 1971)	20 June 2023	Incumbent	3 years, 67 days	Finns	Orpo

== Former minister of Transport and Communications Anne Berner ==
A key political initiative of minister Berner's term has been a new transport code, consisting of a complete reform of the legalization governing the markets in the transport sector. The transport code reform has been seen as ground breaking in Europe, heavily deregulating existing transport legalization and on the other hand laying grounds for future transport models such as Mobility as a Service. The legal project will be implemented in three stages, with new road traffic legalization already presented to the parliament in August 2016.

Berner has been proposed several means for Finland to meet its environmental and climate commitments set under the UN's Paris Agreement. Berner has stated that Finland would halve the amount of fossil fuel used in transport by 2030. In addition to promote more environmentally friendly propulsion means, such as biofuels and electrical vehicles, Berner has spoken for reducing the total mileage required by the society to produce its services.

As a part of the key project and reforms defined in the Finnish Strategic Government Programme, Berner is working on a general deregulation and reduced administrative load in Finland. Another of the key effort Berner is handling calls for growth through digital services, e.g. digitalization, big data and robotization. Berner has also laid several initiatives in these fields, calling for Finland to drive leadership in the development and utilization of new technologies, including 5G networks, autonomous transport and IoT-based solutions.

== See also ==
- Politics of Finland
