= Holkeri cabinet =

64th government of Finland (1987–1991)

Holkeri Cabinet
- 64th Cabinet of Finland
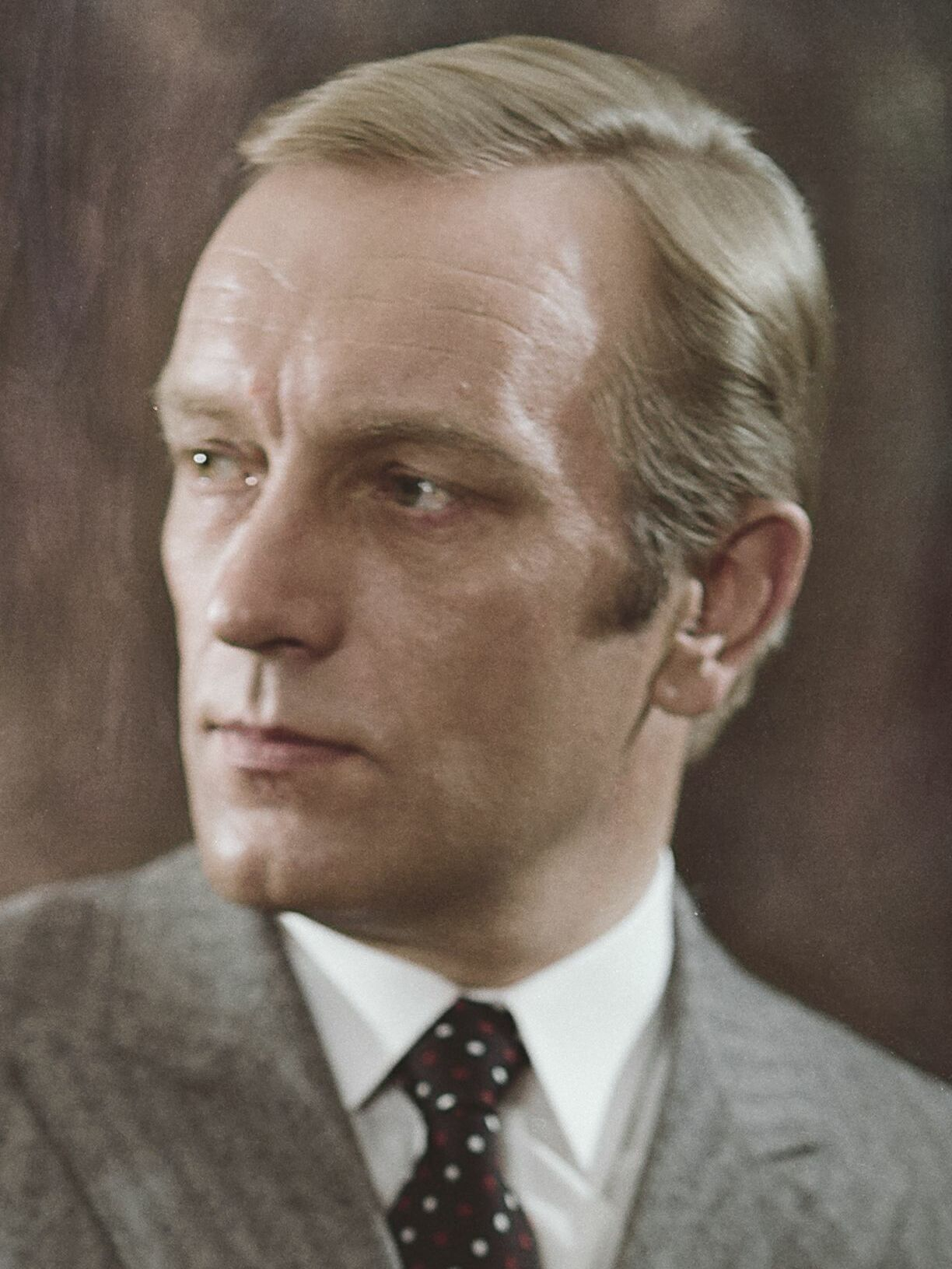
- Date formed: 30 April 1987
- Date dissolved: 26 April 1991

People and organisations
- President: Mauno Koivisto
- Prime Minister: Harri Holkeri
- Member parties: SDP; National Coalition; RKP; Rural Party (until 1990)
- Status in legislature: Majority government

History
- Election: 1987 parliamentary election
- Predecessor: Sorsa IV
- Successor: Aho

The cabinet of Harri Holkeri was the 64th government of Finland, which existed from 30 April 1987 to 26 April 1991. It was a majority government formed by the National Coalition Party, the Social Democratic Party, the Swedish People's Party, and the Rural Party. The cabinet's Prime Minister was Harri Holkeri. The Rural Party left the coalition in August 1990 because it disagreed with the government's pension funding plan.

== Ministers ==
Minister	Time in office	Party
Prime Minister; Harri Holkeri	30 April 1987 – 26 April 1991	National Coalition Party
Minister of Foreign Affairs, Deputy Prime Minister; Kalevi Sorsa; Pertti Paasio	30 April 1987 – 31 January 1989; 1 February 1989 – 26 April 1991	Social Democratic Party
Minister of Justice; Matti Louekoski; Tarja Halonen	30 April 1987 – 28 February 1990; 1 March 1990 – 26 April 1991	Social Democratic Party
Minister of the Interior; Jarmo Rantanen	30 April 1987 – 26 April 1991	Social Democratic Party
Minister of Defence; Ole Norrback; Elisabeth Rehn	30 April 1987 – 13 June 1990; 13 June 1990 – 26 April 1991	Swedish People's Party
Minister of Finance; Erkki Liikanen; Matti Louekoski	30 April 1987 – 28 February 1990; 1 March 1990 – 26 April 1991	Social Democratic Party
Minister of Education; Christoffer Taxell; Ole Norrback	30 April 1987 – 13 June 1990; 14 June 1990 – 26 April 1991	Swedish People's Party
Minister of Agriculture and Forestry; Toivo T. Pohjala	30 April 1987 – 26 April 1991	National Coalition Party
Minister of Transport; Pekka Vennamo; Raimo Vistbacka; Ilkka Kanerva	30 April 1987 – 30 September 1989; 1 October 1989 – 28 August 1990; 28 August 1990 – 26 April 1991	Rural Party
Minister of Transport; Pekka Vennamo; Raimo Vistbacka; Ilkka Kanerva	30 April 1987 – 30 September 1989; 1 October 1989 – 28 August 1990; 28 August 1990 – 26 April 1991	National Coalition Party
Minister of Trade and Industry (Soviet trade); Ilkka Suominen	30 April 1987 – 26 April 1991	National Coalition Party
Minister of Social Affairs and Health; Helena Pesola Mauri Miettinen	30 April 1987 – 31 December 1989; 1 January 1990 – 26 April 1991	National Coalition Party
Minister of Labour; Matti Puhakka	30 April 1987 – 26 April 1991	Social Democratic Party
Minister of Environment Kaj Bärlund	30 April 1987 – 26 April 1991	Social Democratic Party
Deputy Minister of Foreign Affairs; Pertti Salolainen	30 April 1987 – 26 April 1991	National Coalition Party
Minister at Council of State (administration reforms); Ilkka Kanerva	30 April 1987 – 28 August 1990	National Coalition Party
Minister of Interior (Regional policy); Erkki Liikanen; Matti Puhakka	8 May 1987 – 28 February 1990; 1 March 1990 – 26 April 1991	Social Democratic Party
Minister of Education (Cultural issues); Minister of Transport and Communications; Anna-Liisa Kasurinen	30 April 1987 – 26 April 1991	Social Democratic Party
Minister of Finance (taxation issues); Ulla Puolanne	30 April 1987 – 26 April 1991	National Coalition Party
Minister at the Ministry of Social Affairs and Health; Tarja Halonen; Tuulikki Hämäläinen	30 April 1987 – 28 February 1990; 1 March 1990 – 26 April 1991	Social Democratic Party

Preceded by Sorsa IV Cabinet	Cabinet of Finland; 30 April 1987 – 26 April 1991	Succeeded by Aho Cabinet
