= Sorsa III cabinet =

62nd cabinet of Finland

Sorsa III Cabinet
- 62nd Cabinet of Finland
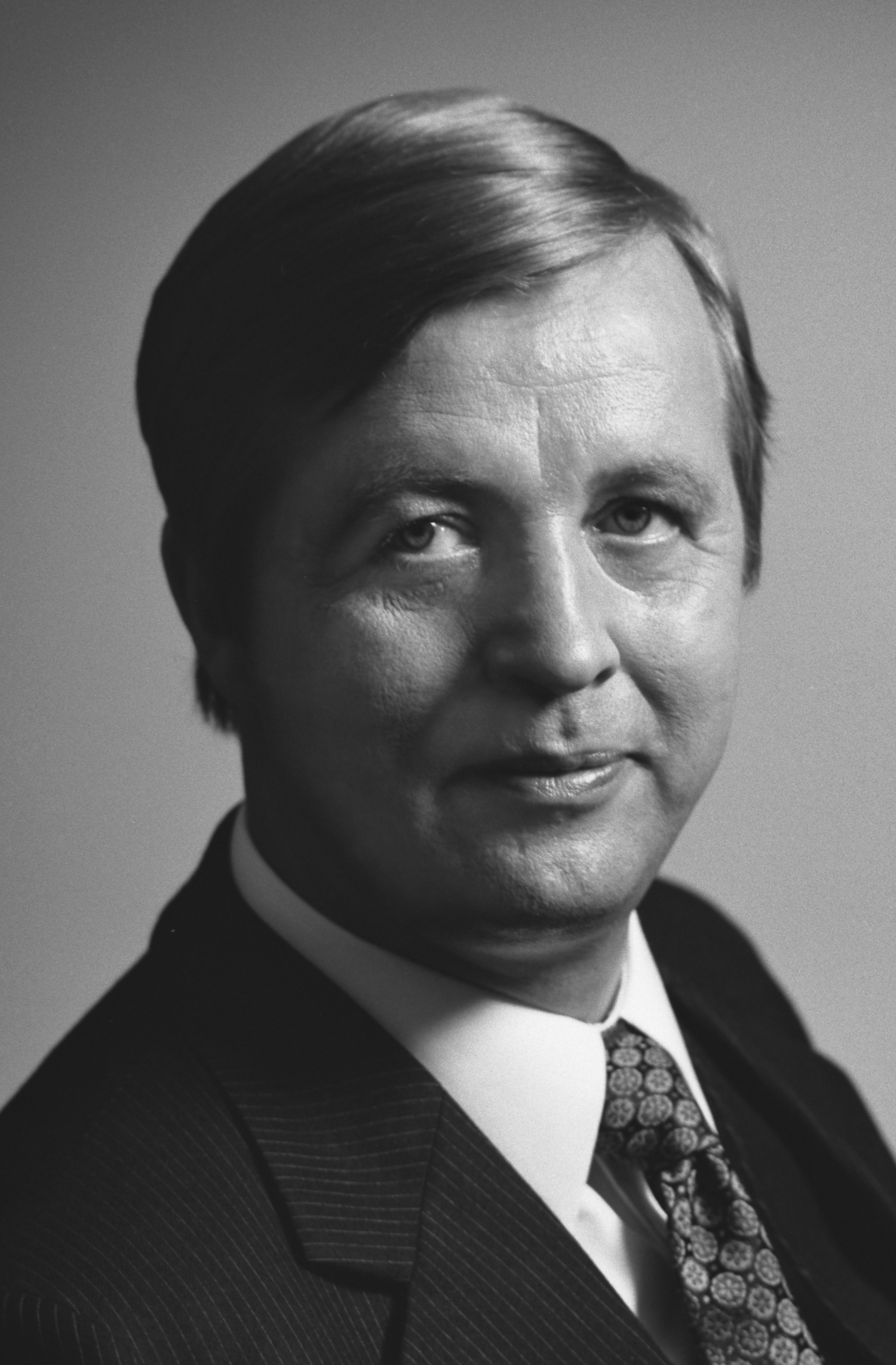
- Date formed: 19 February 1982
- Date dissolved: 6 May 1983

People and organisations
- President: Mauno Koivisto
- Prime Minister: Kalevi Sorsa
- Member parties: 19 February 1982 to 31 December 1982: SDP; Centre Party; RKP; SKDL; 31 December 1982 to 6 May 1983: SDP; Centre Party; RKP; Liberal People's Party
- Status in legislature: Majority government

History
- Election: 1979 parliamentary election
- Predecessor: Koivisto II
- Successor: Sorsa IV

The third cabinet of Kalevi Sorsa was the 62nd government of Finland. The majority government lasted from 19 February 1982 to 6 May 1983. The cabinet's prime minister was Kalevi Sorsa. The Finnish People's Democratic League disapproved of the government's decision to raise the country's defence budget, which led to a governmental crisis, which culminated in the FPDL being forced to resign from the government by the prime minister on 31 December 1982. As a result of the change, the Liberal People's Party joined the coalition and, together with the rest of the previous government, formed the Sorsa IIIb Cabinet.

== Ministers ==
Portfolio	Minister	Took office	Left office	Party
Prime Minister	Kalevi Sorsa	19 February 1982	6 May 1983	SDP
Minister deputising for the Prime Minister	Ahti Pekkala	19 February 1982	6 May 1983	Centre
Minister at the Prime Minister's Office	Mikko Jokela	19 February 1982	6 May 1983	Centre
Minister for Foreign Affairs	Pär Stenbäck	19 February 1982	6 May 1983	RKP
Minister of Justice	Christoffer Taxell	19 February 1982	6 May 1983	RKP
Minister of the Interior	Matti Ahde	19 February 1982	6 May 1983	SDP
Minister at the Ministry of the Interior	Matti Ahde	19 February 1982	6 May 1983	SDP
Minister of Defence	Juhani Saukkonen	19 February 1982	6 May 1983	Centre
Minister of Finance	Ahti Pekkala	19 February 1982	6 May 1983	Centre
Minister at the Ministry of Finance	Mauno Forsman	19 February 1982	15 September 1982	SDP
Minister at the Ministry of Finance	Jermu Laine	15 September 1982	6 May 1983	SDP
Minister at the Ministry for Foreign Affairs	Esko Rekola	19 February 1982	31 December 1982	Independent
Minister at the Ministry for Foreign Affairs	Arne Berner	31 December 1982	6 May 1983	Liberal People's Party
Minister of Education	Kalevi Kivistö	19 February 1982	31 December 1982	SKDL
Minister of Education	Kaarina Suonio	31 December 1982	6 May 1983	SDP
Minister at the Ministry of Education	Kaarina Suonio	19 February 1982	31 December 1982	SDP
Minister at the Ministry of Education	Arvo Salo	31 December 1982	6 May 1983	SDP
Minister of Agriculture and Forestry	Taisto Tähkämaa	19 February 1982	6 May 1983	Centre
Minister at the Ministry of Agriculture and Forestry	Jarmo Wahlström	19 February 1982	31 December 1982	SKDL
Minister of Transport	Jarmo Wahlström	19 February 1982	31 December 1982	SKDL
Minister of Transport	Reino Breilin	31 December 1982	6 May 1983	SDP
Minister of Trade and Industry	Esko Ollila	19 February 1982	6 May 1983	Centre
Minister at the Ministry of Trade and Industry	Matti Ahde	19 February 1982	6 May 1983	SDP
Minister at the Ministry of Trade and Industry	Esko Rekola	19 February 1982	31 December 1982	Independent
Minister at the Ministry of Trade and Industry	Arne Berner	31 December 1982	6 May 1983	Liberal People's Party
Minister of Social Affairs and Health	Jacob Söderman	19 February 1982	30 June 1982	SDP
Minister of Social Affairs and Health	Vappu Taipale	1 July 1982	6 May 1983	SDP
Minister at the Ministry of Social Affairs and Health	Matti Ahde	19 February 1982	6 May 1983	SDP
Minister at the Ministry of Social Affairs and Health	Marjatta Väänänen	19 February 1982	6 May 1983	Centre
Minister of Labour	Jouko Kajanoja	19 February 1982	31 December 1982	SKDL
Minister of Labour	Veikko Helle	31 December 1982	6 May 1983	SDP

Preceded by Koivisto II Cabinet	Cabinet of Finland; 19 February 1982 to 6 May 1983	Succeeded by Sorsa IV Cabinet
