= Sorsa IV cabinet =

63rd cabinet of Finland

Sorsa IV Cabinet
- 63rd Cabinet of Finland
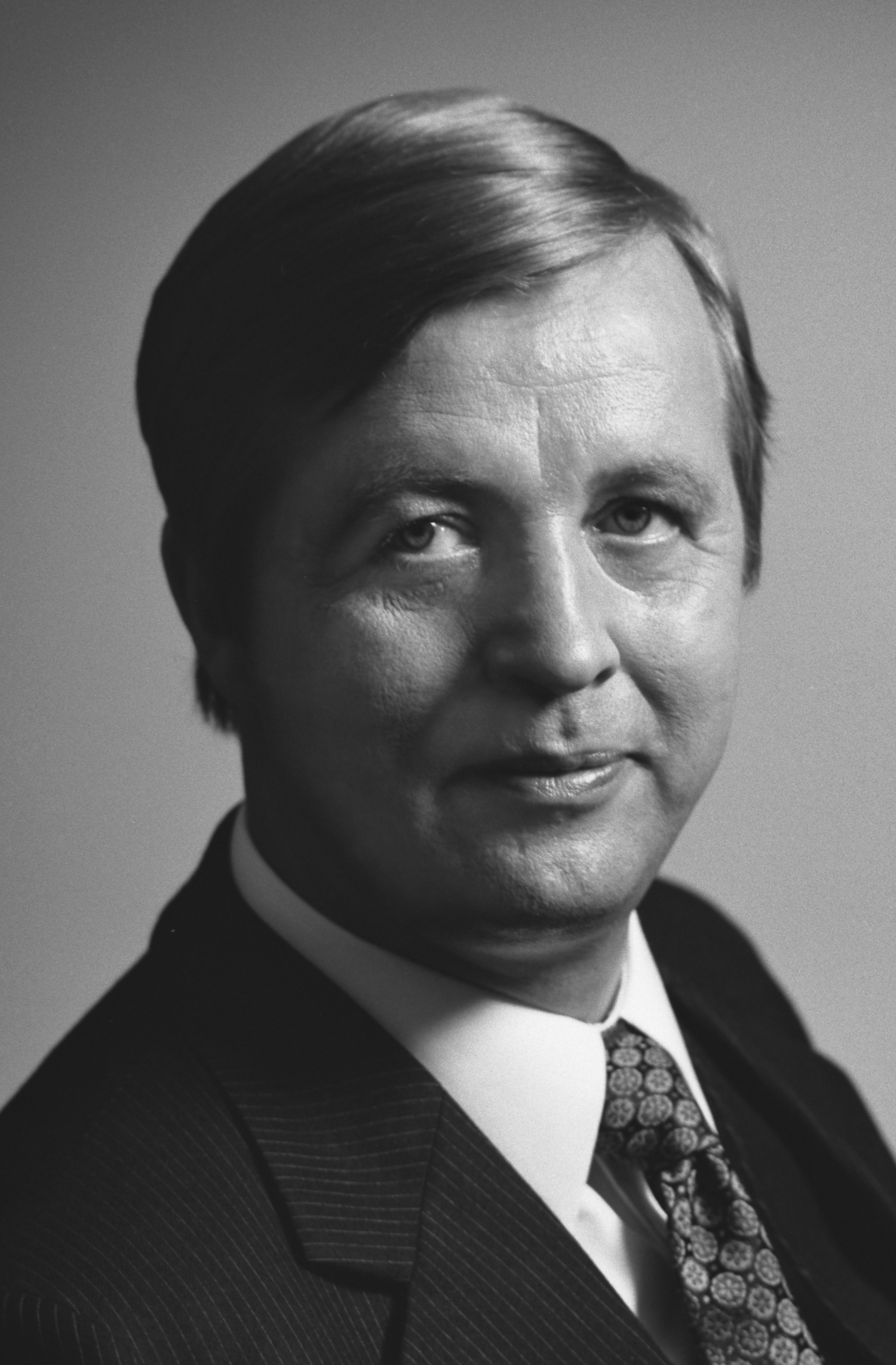
- Date formed: 6 May 1983
- Date dissolved: 30 April 1987

People and organisations
- President: Mauno Koivisto
- Prime Minister: Kalevi Sorsa
- Member parties: SDP; Centre Party; RKP; Rural Party
- Status in legislature: Majority government

History
- Election: 1983 parliamentary election
- Predecessor: Sorsa III
- Successor: Holkeri

Sorsa's fourth cabinet was the 63rd government of Finland, which existed for 1 456 days, from 6 May 1983 to 30 April 1987. The government’s Prime Minister was Kalevi Sorsa. It was a majority government based on the ”red-soil government” model (Finnish: punamultahallitus), as it was a coalition formed by the Social Democrats, the Centre Party, the Swedish People’s Party, and the Rural Party.

== Ministers ==
Minister	Time in office	Party
Prime Minister; Kalevi Sorsa	6 May 1983 – 30 April 1987	Social Democratic Party
Deputy Prime Minister; Paavo Väyrynen	6 May 1983 – 30 April 1987	Centre Party
Minister at Council of State Toivo Yläjärvi	6 May 1983 – 29 February 1984	Centre Party
Minister of Foreign Affairs; Paavo Väyrynen	6 May 1983 – 30 April 1987	Centre Party
Deputy Minister of Foreign Affairs; Jermu Laine	6 May 1983 – 30 April 1987	Social Democratic Party
Minister of Justice; Christoffer Taxell	6 May 1983 – 30 April 1987	Swedish People's Party
Minister of the Interior; Matti Ahde; Matti Luttinen; Kaisa Raatikainen	6 May 1983 – 30 September 1983; 1 October 1983 – 30 November 1984; 1 December 1984 – 30 April 1987	Social Democratic Party; Social Democratic Party; Social Democratic Party
Deputy Minister of the Interior; Matti Luttinen; Toivo Yläjärvi	6 May 1983 – 30 September 1983; 1 March 1984 – 30 April 1987	Social Democratic Party; Centre Party
Minister of Defence Veikko Pihlajamäki	6 May 1983 – 30 April 1987	Centre Party
Minister of Finance; Ahti Pekkala Esko Ollila	6 May 1983 – 31 January 1986; 1 February 1986 – 30 April 1987	Centre Party; Centre Party
Deputy Minister of Finance; Pekka Vennamo	6 May 1983 – 30 April 1987	Rural Party
Minister of Education; Kaarina Suonio; Pirjo Ala-Kapee	6 May 1983 – 31 May 1986; 1 June 1986 – 30 April 1987	Social Democratic Party; Social Democratic Party
Deputy Minister of Education (Science and Culture) Gustav Björkstrand	6 May 1983 – 30 April 1987	Swedish People's Party
Minister of Agriculture and Forestry; Toivo Yläjärvi	6 May 1983 – 30 April 1987	Centre Party
Deputy Minister of Agriculture and Forestry; Matti Ahde	6 May 1983 – 30 September 1983	Social Democratic Party
Minister of Traffic; Matti Puhakka; Matti Luttinen	6 May 1983 – 30 November 1984; 1 December 1984 – 30 April 1987	Social Democratic Party; Social Democratic Party
Minister of Trade and Industry; Seppo Lindblom	6 May 1983 – 30 April 1987	Social Democratic Party
Deputy Minister of Trade and Industry (Foreign Trade); Jermu Laine	6 May 1983 – 30 April 1987	Social Democratic Party
Deputy Minister of Trade and Industry; Matti Ahde	6 May 1983 – 30 September 1983	Social Democratic Party
Minister of Social Affairs and Health; Eeva Kuuskoski	6 May 1983 – 30 April 1987	Centre Party
Deputy Minister of Social Affairs and Health; Matti Ahde; Vappu Taipale; Matti Puhakka	6 May 1983 – 30 April 1987; 6 May 1983 – 30 November 1984; 1 December 1984 – 30 April 1987	Social Democratic Party; Social Democratic Party; Social Democratic Party
Minister of Labour Urpo Leppänen	6 May 1983 – 30 April 1987	Rural Party
Minister of Environment; Matti Ahde	1 October 1983 – 30 April 1987	Social Democratic Party

Preceded by Sorsa III Cabinet	Cabinet of Finland; 6 May 1983 to 30 April 1987	Succeeded by Holkeri Cabinet
