= Aho cabinet =

65th cabinet of Finland

Aho's Cabinet
- 65th Cabinet of Finland

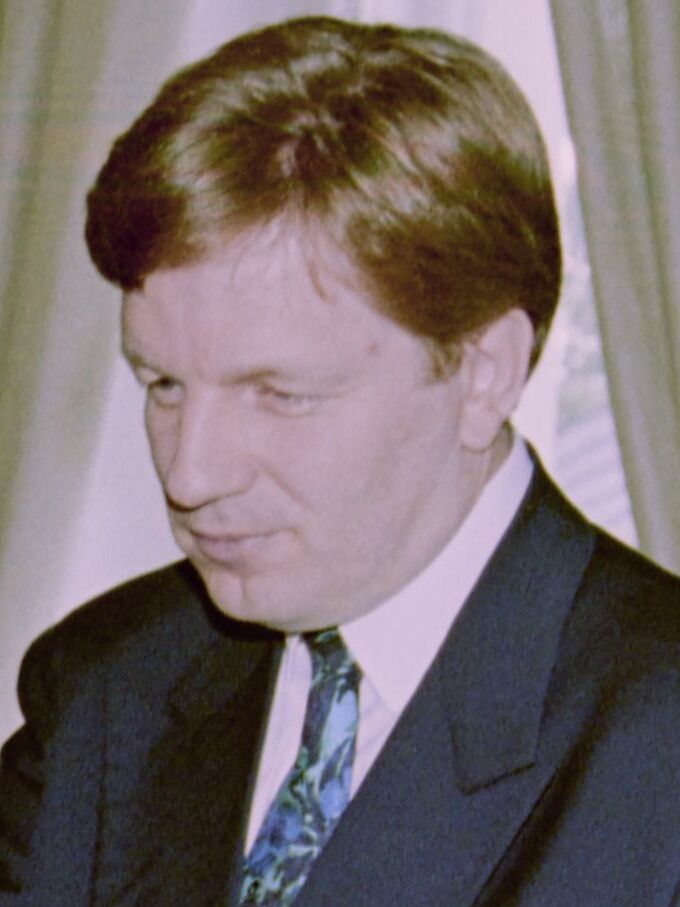
- Date formed: 26 April 1991
- Date dissolved: 13 April 1995

People and organisations
- Head of state: Mauno Koivisto 1991 to 1994; Martti Ahtisaari 1994 to 1995
- Head of government: Esko Aho
- Member party: Centre Party; National Coalition Party; Swedish People's Party; Christian League
- Status in legislature: Majority (coalition)

History
- Election: 1991 parliamentary election
- Predecessor: Holkeri Cabinet
- Successor: Lipponen I Cabinet

The cabinet of Esko Aho was the 65th government of Finland. The cabinet existed from 26 April 1991 to 13 April 1995. The cabinet’s Prime Minister was Esko Aho.

The Aho Government started its term when Finland was in the midst of its history’s worst economic downfall and a banking crisis. In 1991, the failed coup in Moscow ended the Soviet Union and the Aho cabinet terminated the Agreement of Friendship, Cooperation, and Mutual Assistance.

Finland joined the European Union in 1995 following the 1994 referendum. The Christian League left the Government because they opposed Finland’s membership in the European Union.

== Ministers ==
| Minister | Period of office | Party |
|---|---|---|
| Prime Minister; Esko Aho | 26 April 1991 – 13 April 1995 | Centre Party |
| Minister of Foreign Affairs; Paavo Väyrynen; Heikki Haavisto; Paavo Rantanen | 26 April 1991 – 5 May 1993; 5 May 1993 – 3 February 1995; 3 February 1995 – 13 April 1995 | Centre Party |
| Minister of Foreign Affairs; Paavo Väyrynen; Heikki Haavisto; Paavo Rantanen | 26 April 1991 – 5 May 1993; 5 May 1993 – 3 February 1995; 3 February 1995 – 13 April 1995 | Independent |
| Minister of Foreign Affairs (European policy), Deputy Prime Minister; Pertti Salolainen | 26 April 1991 – 13 April 1995 | National Coalition Party |
| Minister of Foreign Affairs (Development issues); Toimi Kankaanniemi | 26 April 1991 – 28 June 1994 | Christian League |
| Minister of Justice; Hannele Pokka; Anneli Jäätteenmäki | 26 April 1991 – 30 April 1994; 1 May 1994 – 13 April 1995 | Centre Party |
| Minister of Interior; Mauri Pekkarinen | 26 April 1991 – 13 April 1995 | Centre Party |
| Minister of Defence; Elisabeth Rehn; Jan-Erik Enestam | 26 April 1991 – 1 January 1995; 2 January 1995 – 13 April 1995 | Swedish People's Party |
| Minister of Finance; Iiro Viinanen | 26 April 1991 – 13 April 1995 | National Coalition Party |
| Minister of Education; Riitta Uosukainen; Olli-Pekka Heinonen | 26 April 1991 – 11 February 1994; 11 February 1994 – 13 April 1995 | National Coalition Party |
| Minister of Culture; Tytti Isohookana-Asunmaa | 26 April 1991 – 13 April 1995 | Centre Party |
| Minister of Agriculture and Forestry; Martti Pura; Mikko Pesälä | 26 April 1991 – 12 April 1994; 12 April 1994 – 13 April 1995 | Centre Party |
| Minister of Traffic; Ole Norrback | 26 April 1991 – 13 April 1995 | Swedish People's Party |
| Minister of Trade and Industry; Kauko Juhantalo; Pekka Tuomisto; Seppo Kääriäinen | 26 April 1991 – 3 August 1992; 3 August 1992 – 31 July 1993; 1 August 1993 – 13 April 1995 | Centre Party |
| Minister of Social Affairs and Health; Eeva Kuuskoski; Jorma Huuhtanen | 26 April 1991 – 24 April 1992; 24 April 1992 – 13 April 1995 | Centre Party |
| Minister of Labour Deputy Prime Minister; Ilkka Kanerva | 26 April 1991 – 13 April 1995 | National Coalition Party |
| Minister of Environment; Sirpa Pietikäinen | 26 April 1991 – 13 April 1995 | National Coalition Party |
| Minister of Housing; Pirjo Rusanen; Anneli Taina | 26 April 1991 – 2 January 1995; 2 January 1995 – 13 April 1995 | National Coalition Party |

| Preceded by Holkeri Cabinet | Cabinet of Finland; 26 April 1991 to 13 April 1995 | Succeeded by Lipponen I |
