= Ilkka Kanerva =

Finnish politician (1948–2022)

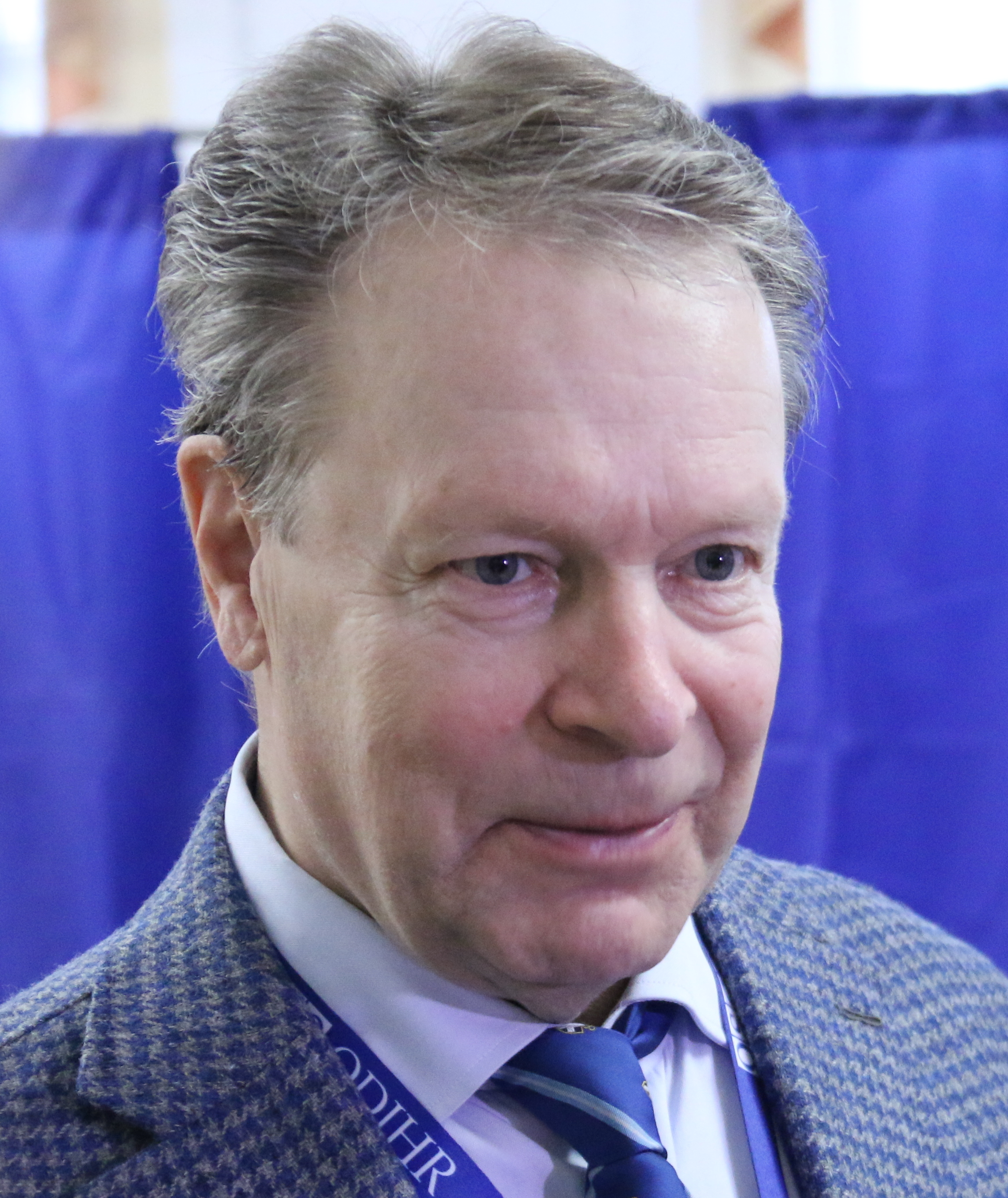
- Kanerva in 2019

Deputy Prime Minister of Finland
- In office 26 April 1991 – 23 August 1991
- Prime Minister: Esko Aho
- Preceded by: Pertti Paasio
- Succeeded by: Pertti Salolainen

Minister for Foreign Affairs
- In office 19 April 2007 – 4 April 2008
- Prime Minister: Matti Vanhanen
- Preceded by: Erkki Tuomioja
- Succeeded by: Alexander Stubb

Minister of Labour
- In office 26 April 1991 – 12 April 1995
- Prime Minister: Esko Aho
- Preceded by: Matti Puhakka
- Succeeded by: Liisa Jaakonsaari

Minister of Transport
- In office 28 August 1990 – 25 April 1991
- Prime Minister: Harri Holkeri
- Preceded by: Raimo Vistbacka
- Succeeded by: Ole Norrback

Member of the Parliament of Finland
- In office 1975–2022
- Constituency: Southwest Finland

Personal details
- Born: 28 January 1948 Lokalahti, Southwest Finland, Finland
- Died: 14 April 2022 (aged 74) Turku, Southwest Finland, Finland
- Party: National Coalition Party
- Website: ike.fi

Ilkka Armas Mikael Kanerva (28 January 1948 – 14 April 2022) was a Finnish politician and a member of the Parliament of Finland. He was born in Lokalahti, now a part of Uusikaupunki in Southwest Finland. He was the Minister for Foreign Affairs from 2007 to 2008. Kanerva was a member of the National Coalition Party.

With nearly 47 years in office, at the time of his death Kanerva was the longest-serving member in the history of the Finnish Parliament. His record was broken by his party colleague Ben Zyskowicz in October 2025.

== Early life ==
Kanerva graduated with a master's degree in political science from the University of Turku in 1980. Kanerva was leader of the political youth organisation Kokoomuksen Nuorten Liitto ry. from 1972 to 1976 and was first elected to the Finnish Parliament in 1975.

== Political career ==
During his public career, he served as Minister for Foreign Affairs (2007–2008), Deputy Prime Minister (1991), Minister of Labour (1991–1995) and Minister of Transport (1990–1991). During the Finnish OSCE Chairmanship in 2008, Kanerva was the Chairman-in-Office of the Organization for Security and Co-operation in Europe for 2008. In 2014 he was elected president of the Parliamentary Assembly of the OSCE. Kanerva served as Emeritus President and Special Representative on Mediation of Parliamentary Assembly of the OSCE.

The National Coalition Party announced the resignation of Ilkka Kanerva from the post of the Foreign Minister on 1 April 2008 due to a scandal involving hundreds of sexually suggestive text messages he sent to the erotic dancer, Johanna Tukiainen, from his work mobile phone. Kanerva left for a sick leave on 1 April, and his term officially ended on 4 April 2008.

Kanerva had a long career in athletics and, at an early age, he was actively practising track and field himself. From 1981 to 1982 and from 1989 to 1990 he held the chair in the Finnish Athletics' National Assembly. Kanerva served as Vice-President of Finnish Athletics, a post he held for 15 consecutive years until the 2005 IAAF World Championships in Helsinki, where he was also the President of Local Organizing Committee. Kanerva served as Honorary Chair of the Finnish Athletics Federation. Kanerva also served as Vice-President of the Finnish Olympic Committee from 1993 to 2008. Additionally, Kanerva was a council member of the International Association of the Athletics Federations (IAAF) 2003–2011. He was a Member of the EAA Council from 1999 to 2003.

=== Campaign finance ===
Kanerva was among the National Coalition Party members receiving support from construction industry in the election in 2007 in Finland without giving the public information of it in time. Others included: Sauli Niinistö, Jyrki Katainen, Jyri Häkämies, Marja Tiura, Sampsa Kataja, Jari Koskinen and Juha Hakola (politician).

=== Texting scandal ===
In March 2008 it was revealed that Kanerva had sent 200 SMS messages within a month to Johanna Tukiainen, a 29-year-old erotic dancer. Kanerva had previously sent SMS messages to nude model Marika Fingerroos in 2005. According to Kanerva, Tukiainen had wanted to perform with her dance group at his birthday party, and he responded to this request by text message.

On 30 March, Kanerva unexpectedly cancelled his plan to participate in Lennart Meri Conference in Tallinn, Estonia, and returned to Finland. The Hymy magazine published on 1 April 2008 printed several of the messages, and on the same morning party leader Jyrki Katainen stated that Kanerva can not continue in his position.

Kanerva was granted sick leave, and later that day it was released that his term as Foreign Minister would end on 4 April 2008 due to loss of confidence. He was replaced by Alexander Stubb.

=== Corruption trial ===
Kanerva was accused of and investigated in a bribery case in 2010–2013. The Helsinki Court of Appeals found him not guilty in 2013.

On 9 June 2011, in the Helsinki District Court Ilkka Kanerva was accused of accepting bribes. The prosecutor demanded a two-year prison sentence and €56,000 in damages for the received advantage. Police had charged Kanerva in May 2010. The accepted bribes were connected to the building of a shopping center.

Ilkka Kanerva was suspected of receiving bribes and interviewed by police in the end of March 2010. Kanerva was accused of receiving 17,000 € from Nova Group (Finland) (construction business, a key actor in the Finance scandal 2007) during his 60-years anniversary in 2008 and over 50,000 € in favor of the aimed new large shopping centers. The prosecutor demanded two years of imprisonment for bribery. The claims were kept secret until the trial in April 2012. The media had applied publicity prior to the trial based on the political importance but failed to receive it.

In 2012 Ilkka Kanerva was convicted and sentenced to 15 months for corruption and abuse of office by District Court.

Ilkka Kanerva, Arto Merisalo, Tapani Yli-Saunamäki and Toivo Sukari were seeking to overturn their bribery convictions in March 2013. The prosecutor wanted a longer sentence against Kanerva.

The Helsinki Court of Appeal overturned MP Ilkka Kanerva's sentence for acceptance of bribes in June 2013. In 2012, the District Court had found Kanerva guilty of accepting tens of thousands of euros worth of gifts from the executives, who were seen to thereby gain influence over Kanerva's actions as chair of the Regional Council of Southwest Finland. Among other things, the council has decision-making power over the zoning of new shopping centres. The Court of Appeal also overturned the sentences for aggravated bribery of three businessmen, Arto Merisalo, Tapani Yli-Saunamäki and Toivo Sukari. The District Court had sentenced Merisalo and Yli-Saunamäki to long prison terms.

== Death ==
Kanerva died after an illness in 2022.

Preceded by Erkki Tuomioja	Minister for Foreign Affairs (Finland); 2007–2008	Succeeded by Alexander Stubb
