= Vappu Taipale =

Finnish child psychiatrist and politician

Professori Vappu Taipale
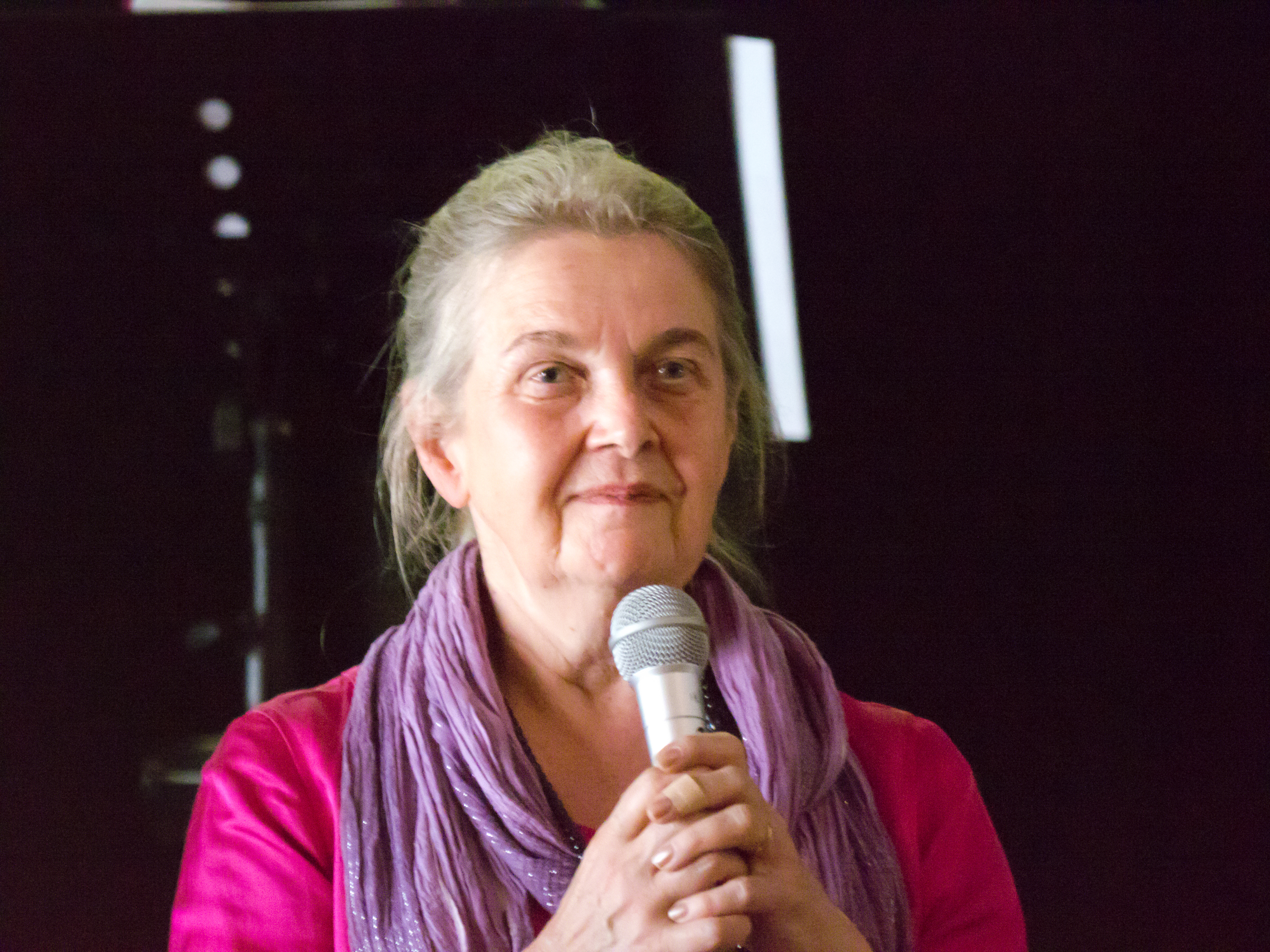
- Taipale in 2011
- Born: Vappu Tuulikki Puustinen; 1 May 1940; Vaasa, Finland
- Education: Doctor of Medicine and Surgery
- Alma mater: University of Helsinki
- Occupations: Psychiatrist, politician
- Years active: 1966-2008
- Spouse: Ilkka Taipale

Deputy Minister and Minister of Social Affairs and Health
- In office 1982–1984

Director-General, National Agency for Welfare and Health / National Research and Development Centre for Welfare and Health
- In office 1985–2008

Vappu Taipale (née Puustinen; born 1 May 1940) is a Finnish retired politician and physician.

== Medical career ==
In 1966, Taipale graduated with a licentiate's degree in medicine and qualified to practise medicine. In 1980, she obtained her doctorate in the field of psychiatry from the University of Helsinki.

She worked as a psychiatrist in various roles at the Helsinki University Central Hospital throughout the 1970s. She has also held the positions of Docent (Associate Professor) at the universities of Kuopio (now the University of Eastern Finland) and Tampere, specialising in child and adolescent psychiatry.

In 1991, Taipale was awarded the title of Professor, and in 1998 she received an honorary doctorate in public administration (Hallintotieteiden kunniatohtori) from the University of Vaasa.

== Political career ==
Taipale joined the Social Democratic Party in 1972. She never stood for election to the Parliament, but did run for the party's leadership in 1987.

Despite not being a member of Parliament, Taipale served as the Minister of Social Affairs and Health and the Deputy Minister, respectively, in Kalevi Sorsa's third and fourth cabinets, from July 1982 to November 1984.

Later she headed the National Agency for Welfare and Health (Sosiaali- ja terveyshallitus), and after that was replaced by the National Research and Development Centre for Welfare and Health STAKES in 1992, Taipale served as its Director-General until her retirement in 2008.

She also chaired her party's women's wing, Sosialidemokraattiset Naiset, from 1984 to 1990.

Taipale unsuccessfully ran for her party's nomination in the 1994 Finnish presidential election, being beaten by Martti Ahtisaari, who eventually went on to win the presidency.

== Personal life ==
Vappu Taipale is married to fellow psychiatrist and politician Ilkka Taipale. They met at medical school entrance exams in 1960. The couple have four children.

In 2001, she caused controversy by admitting in a newspaper interview to having experimented with LSD during her student years and considering it a worthwhile experience, for which she later apologised.
