= Pirjo Ala-Kapee-Hakulinen =

Finnish politician (born 1944)

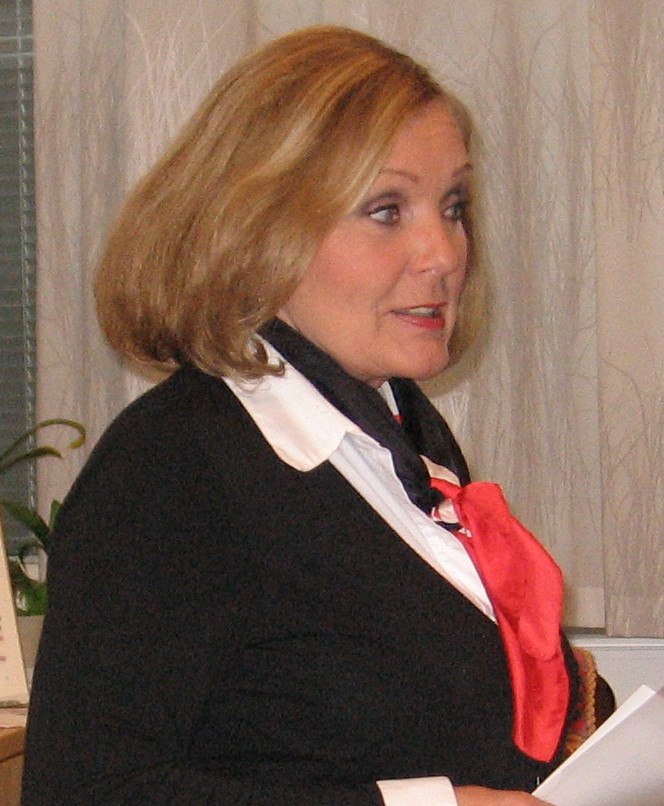

Member of the Parliament of Finland
- In office 24 March 1979 – 30 April 1989

Minister of Education of Finland
- In office 1 January 1986 – 30 April 1987

Personal details
- Born: 25 March 1944 (age 82) Vihti, Finland
- Party: Social Democratic

Pirjo Anneli Ala-Kapee-Hakulinen (born 25 March 1944) is a Finnish politician who was the minister of education in the fourth cabinet of prime minister Kalevi Sorsa from 1986 to 1987. A member of the Social Democratic Party, she was also a member of the Finnish Parliament from 1979 to 1989.

== Biography ==
Ala-Kapee-Hakulinen was born on 25 March 1944 in Vihti, Finland. She completed the matriculation exam in 1966 and attended the University of Tampere, receiving the Master of Arts degree in 1972. After graduating, Ala-Kapee-Hakulinen taught history and social studies at the Kiljava Institute, where she was a deputy principal from 1973 to 1975. She was a member of the Ylöjärvi town council in 1973. From 1975 to 1979, she worked at the Central Organisation of Finnish Trade Unions as researcher and secretary of the organization's history committee. She was elected to the city council of Vantaa in 1977, a position that she held until 1989.

Ala-Kapee-Hakulinen represented the constituency of Uusimaa in the Parliament of Finland from 24 March 1979 to 30 April 1989. A member of the Social Democratic Party of Finland, she sat on the Education Committee from 1979 to 1986 and the Finance Committee from 1987 to 1989. She has been described as being part of the SDP's left wing. In 1986, after minister of education Kaarina Suonio resigned to become the deputy mayor of Tampere, Ala-Kapee-Hakulinen was appointed by prime minister Kalevi Sorsa to fill the vacancy. She was the education minister in Sorsa's fourth cabinet from 1 January 1986 to 30 April 1987, and focused on vocational schools during her time as minister. Ala-Kapee-Hakulinen was the Second Deputy Chair of the SDP between 1987 and 1990.

In 1989, Ala-Kapee-Hakulinen left Parliament to become the mayor of Vantaa. When the province of Eastern Finland was formed in 1997, she became its first and only governor until Finland's provinces were abolished in January 2010.

Ala-Kapee-Hakulinen's first husband died of cancer in 1996. They had been married for 32 years. In 2001, she married Kajaani mayor Pentti Hakulinen at Mikkeli Cathedral. In 2012, she returned to the Vantaa city council.

== See also ==
- List of Cabinet Ministers from Finland by ministerial portfolio
