= Elisabeth Rehn =

Finnish politician & diplomat (born 1935)

Minister Elisabeth Rehn VR 1
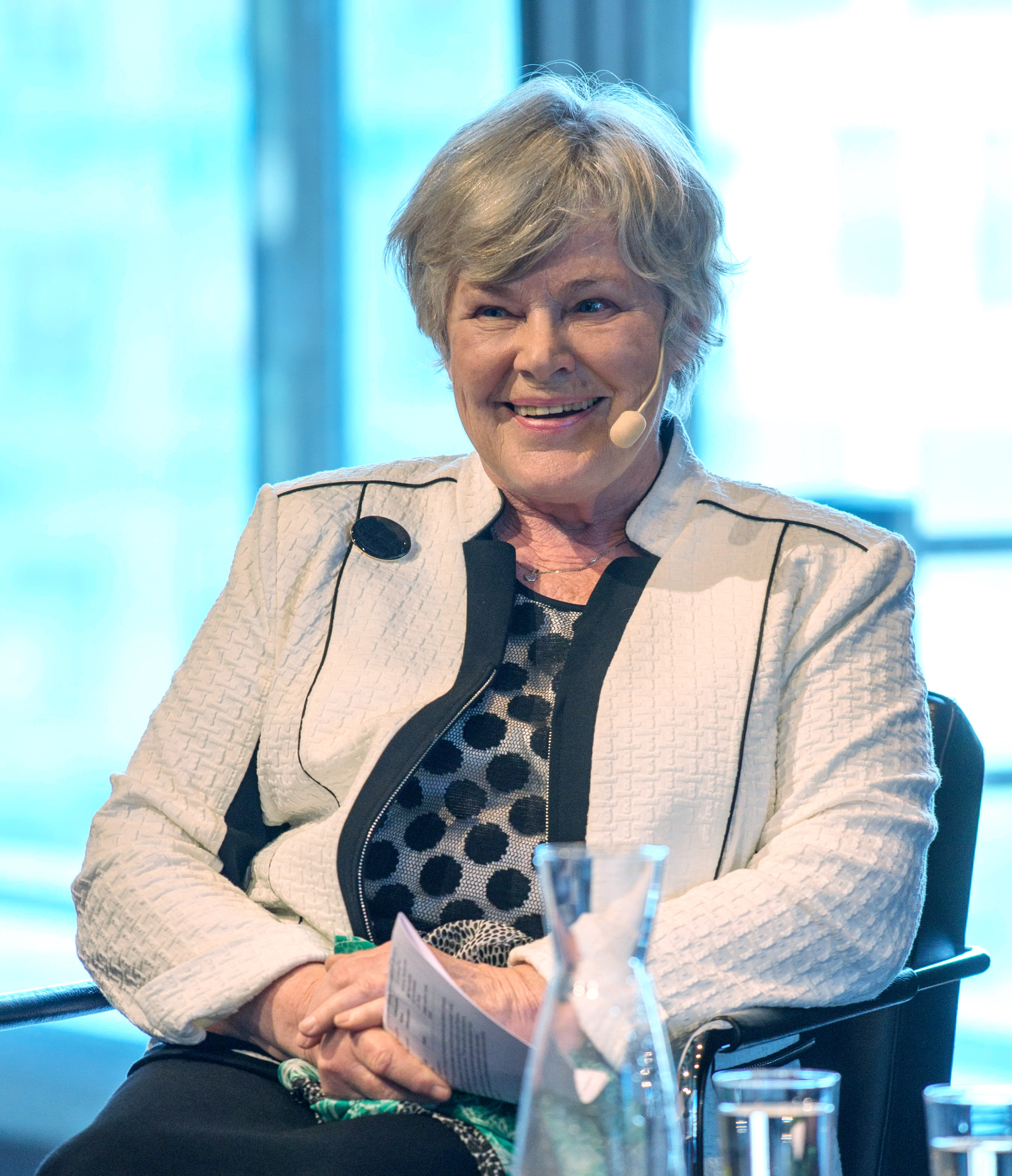
- Rehn at The House of Culture in Stockholm in 2015

Special Representative and Coordinator of the Mission in Bosnia and Herzegovina
- In office 16 January 1998 – 15 July 1999
- Secretary-General: Kofi Annan
- Preceded by: Kai Eide

Special Rapporteur on the situation of human rights in the former Yugoslavia
- In office 27 September 1995 – 15 January 1998
- Secretary-General: Kofi Annan
- Preceded by: Tadeusz Mazowiecki
- Succeeded by: Jiří Dienstbier

Member of the European Parliament
- In office 1 January 1995 – 10 November 1996
- Preceded by: Position established

Minister of Defence of Finland
- In office 13 June 1990 – 1 January 1995
- Prime Minister: Harri Holkeri; Esko Aho
- Preceded by: Ole Norrback
- Succeeded by: Jan-Erik Enestam

Member of the parliament of Finland for Uusimaa
- In office 24 March 1979 – 23 March 1995
- 1987–1990: Parliamentary leader of the Swedish People's Party

Personal details
- Born: Märta Elisabeth Carlberg; 6 April 1935 (age 91) Helsinki, Finland
- Party: Swedish People's Party
- Spouse: Ove Rehn (m. 1955; died 2004)
- Children: 4, including Veronica Rehn-Kivi
- Occupation: Politician; diplomat

Märta Elisabeth Rehn VR 1 (née Carlberg; born 6 April 1935) is a Finnish former politician and diplomat. She served as the Minister of Defence of Finland during 1990 to 1995 and as an Under-Secretary-General of the United Nations during 1998 to 1999. She was also a member of the Finnish Parliament and parliamentary leader of the Swedish People's Party of Finland, and a member of the European Parliament.

== Early life and education ==
Rehn was born on 6 April 1935 in Helsinki, Finland. She spent her childhood in Mäntsälä, where her father worked as a community medical doctor. Rehn went to a local school in Mäntsälä before entering a boarding school in Kauniainen.

Rehn received a Master of Science degree in economics from Hanken School of Economics in 1957 and has honorary doctorates in political science from both Hanken School of Economics and Åbo Akademi University and an honorary doctorate in military science from the National Defence University.

In the early 1960s, she was recognized as the first person in Finland to import and market plastic Tupperware containers.

== Career ==
Rehn was first elected as a member of parliament for Uusimaa in 1979. She was the parliamentary leader of the Swedish People's Party of Finland from 1987 to 1990.

She was appointed as Minister of Defence to the Holkeri Cabinet, succeeding Ole Norrback, in 1990. Upon her assumption of office on 13 June 1990, she became the first female defence minister of a European nation and the sixth in the world. When Esko Aho succeeded Harri Holkeri as Prime Minister of Finland in 1991, Rehn was retained as defence minister and, in addition, was appointed Minister of Equality Affairs in the Ministry of Social Affairs and Health. During her tenure in office, a law was passed permitting women to perform voluntary national military service.

Her popularity in office led to the Swedish People's Party candidacy in the 1994 Finnish presidential election. She earned enough votes in early elections to make it to the final round, in which she faced diplomat Martti Ahtisaari of the Social Democratic Party of Finland. She received 46.1% of the final vote.

Rehn was appointed a member of the European Parliament (MEP) for Finland during the 1995–1996 period of the Fourth European Parliament, a position established as part of the 1995 enlargement of the European Union. Her term began on 1 January 1995 and she remained in office until 10 November 1996.

On 27 September 1995, the Secretary-General of the United Nations, Kofi Annan, appointed Rehn as Special Rapporteur on the situation of human rights in the Republic of Croatia, FRY, Bosnia and Herzegovina, and Republic of Macedonia – collectively, the states comprising the former Yugoslavia. After several years as Special Rapporteur, she was appointed an Under-Secretary-General of the United Nations, with the specific assignment of Special Representative of the Secretary-General and Coordinator of the United Nations Mission in Bosnia and Herzegovina, an office she held during 16 January 1998 to 15 July 1999. While on assignment, she was one of the earliest observers to visit the mass graves of the Srebrenica massacre.

== Other activities ==
Elisabeth Rehn and Lamija Tanović were the key founding members and patrons of the United World College in Mostar, Bosnia and Herzegovina.

Rehn was a member of the Global Leadership Foundation (GLF) until November 2017. GLF is an organization which works to support democratic leadership, prevent and resolve conflict through mediation and promote good governance in the form of democratic institutions, open markets, human rights and the rule of law. It does so by making available, discreetly and in confidence, the experience of former leaders to today's national leaders. It is a non-profit organization composed of former heads of government, senior governmental and international organization officials who work closely with heads of government on governance-related issues of concern to them.

=== Memberships and NGO positions ===
- European Leadership Network
- Femmes Africa Solidarité, Advisory Board member, 2005–
- Finnish Red Cross, Vice-chair, 1984–1988
- Global Leadership Foundation, –2017
- Intellibridge, Advisory Council member
- International Court of Justice, Trust Fund for Victims, Board of Directors member
- Organization for Security and Co-operation in Europe, Court of Conciliation and Arbitration of the Organization for Security and Co-operation in Europe member, 1994–
- Regional Women's Lobby South Eastern Europe, Advisory Board member
- UNICEF, Finnish Committee member, 1982–1994
  - Chair of the Standing Group of the National Committees of UNICEF, 1988–1993
- UNIFEM
  - Independent expert on women's role in peace-building, 2001–2003
  - Global study on the implementation of UN Security Council resolution 1325, High Level Advisory Group member, 2015
- UNIFEM Finland, Vice-chair of the Board, 2003–2005
- WWF Finland, Chair of Board of Trustees, 2000–2006
- Zonta International, International Honorary Member

== Works ==
- Rehn, Elisabeth; Johnson Sirleaf, Ellen (2002). "Women, War and Peace: The Independent Experts' Assessment on the Impact of Armed Conflict on Women and Women's Role in Peace-building" (PDF). Progress of the World's Women 2002. 1. United Nations Development Fund for Women. ISBN 9780912917665.
- Rehn, Elisabeth; Aimé, Jean Claude (2005). "UNDP in the Occupied Palestinian Territory: Programme Review 2005". United Nations Development Programme.
- Kang, Kyung-wha; Rehn, Elisabeth; Mukwege, Denis (3 March 2011). "Report of the Panel on Remedies and Reparations for Victims of Sexual Violence in the Democratic Republic of Congo to the High Commissioner for Human Rights". United Nations Office of the High Commissioner for Human Rights.

== Personal life ==
Rehn was married to Ove Rehn from 1955 until his death in 2004, and they have four children: Joakim, Charlotta, Johan, and Veronica Rehn-Kivi, a member of parliament.

Rehn is a two-time cancer survivor. She recovered from colon cancer in the 1990s and was diagnosed with breast cancer in 2000.

== Honours and awards ==
=== Honours ===
==== National honours ====
- Finland: Order of the Cross of Liberty, 1st class (2002)

==== Foreign honours ====
- Estonia: Order of the Cross of Terra Mariana, 1st class (2003)

=== Awards ===
- Axel Olof Freudenthal Medal – Gold (see Axel Olof Freudenthal), Swedish People's Party of Finland (1994)
- (Finland) Honorary Doctorate in Political Science, Hanken School of Economics (1994)
- Fredrika Runeberg Stipend (see Fredrika Runeberg), Swedish Cultural Foundation in Finland (1996)
- (Finland) Sibelius Medal, Lions Club Jean Sibelius in Järvenpää (2 January 1996)
- (Finland) Honorary Doctorate in Political Science, Åbo Akademi University (1998)
- St. Henry's Cross, Evangelical Lutheran Church of Finland (2013)
- (Finland) Honorary Doctorate in Military Science, National Defence University (2013)
