= Koivisto II cabinet =

61st cabinet of Finland

Koivisto II Cabinet
- 61st Cabinet of Finland
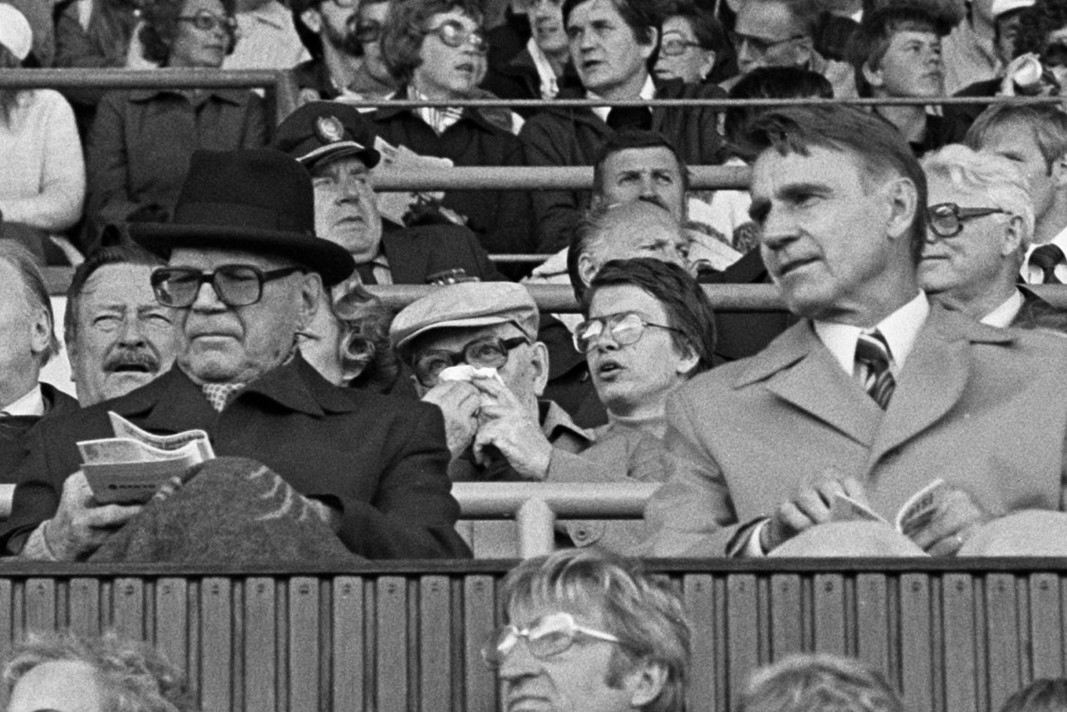
- Pres. Urho Kekkonen and PM Mauno Koivisto at the Helsinki Olympic Stadium in 1980
- Date formed: 26 May 1979
- Date dissolved: 19 February 1982

People and organisations
- Prime Minister: Mauno Koivisto
- Member parties: SDP; Centre Party; SKDL; RKP
- Status in legislature: Majority government

History
- Predecessor: Sorsa II
- Successor: Sorsa III

The second cabinet of Mauno Koivisto was the 61st government of Finland, which was in office from 26 May 1979 to 19 February 1982. It was a majority government composed of a coalition between the Social Democrats, the Centre Party, the Swedish People’s Party, and the People’s Democratic League. The government was dissolved on 26 January 1982 due to Prime Minister Mauno Koivisto being elected the 9th President of Finland.

Assembly
| Minister | Period of office | Party |
|---|---|---|
| Prime Minister; Mauno Koivisto | 26 May 1979 – 26 January 1982 | Social Democratic Party |
| Deputy Prime Minister; Eino Uusitalo | 26 May 1979 – 26 January 1982 | Centre Party |
| Minister of Foreign Affairs; Paavo Väyrynen | 26 May 1979 – 26 January 1982 | Centre Party |
| Minister of Justice; Christoffer Taxell | 26 May 1979 – 26 January 1982 | Swedish People's Party |
| Minister of Interior; Eino Uusitalo | 26 May 1979 – 26 January 1982 | Centre Party |
| Deputy Minister of Interior; Johannes Koikkalainen | 26 May 1979 – 26 January 1982 | Social Democratic Party |
| Minister of Defence; Lasse Äikäs | 26 May 1979 – 26 January 1982 | Centre Party |
| Minister of Finance; Ahti Pekkala | 26 May 1979 – 26 January 1982 | Centre Party |
| Minister of Education; Pär Stenbäck | 26 May 1979 – 26 January 1982 | Swedish People's Party |
| Deputy Minister of Education; Kalevi Kivistö | 26 May 1979 – 26 January 1982 | People's Democratic League |
| Minister of Agriculture and Forestry; Taisto Tähkämaa | 26 May 1979 – 26 January 1982 | Centre Party |
| Minister of Traffic; Veikko Saarto | 26 May 1979 – 26 January 1982 | People's Democratic League |
| Minister of Trade and Industry; Ulf Sundqvist; Pirkko Työläjärvi | 26 May 1979 – 30 June 1981; 1 July 1981 – 19 February 1982 | Social Democratic Party; Social Democratic Party |
| Deputy Minister of Trade and Industry; Johannes Koikkalainen; Esko Rekola | 26 May 1979 – 26 January 1982; 26 May 1979 – 26 January 1982 | Social Democratic Party; Social Democratic Party |
| Minister of Social Affairs and Health; Sinikka Luja-Penttilä | 26 May 1979 – 26 January 1982 | Social Democratic Party |
| Minister of Labour; Arvo Aalto; Jouko Kajanoja | 26 May 1979 – 20 March 1981; 20 March 1981 – 19 February 1982 | People's Democratic League; People's Democratic League |
| Deputy Minister of Social Affairs and Health; Katri-Helena Eskelinen | 26 May 1979 – 26 January 1982 | Centre Party |
| Deputy Minister of Finance; Pirkko Työläjärvi; Mauno Forsman | 26 May 1979 – 30 June 1981; 1 July 1981 – 19 February 1982 | Social Democratic Party; Social Democratic Party |
| Minister at Council of State; Eino Uusitalo | 26 May 1979 – 26 January 1982 | Centre Party |
| Deputy Minister of Foreign Affairs; Esko Rekola | 26 May 1979 – 26 January 1982 | Independent |

| Preceded by Sorsa II Cabinet | Cabinet of Finland; 26 May 1979 – 26 January 1982 | Succeeded by Sorsa III Cabinet |
