= Esko Aho =

Prime minister of Finland from 1991 to 1995

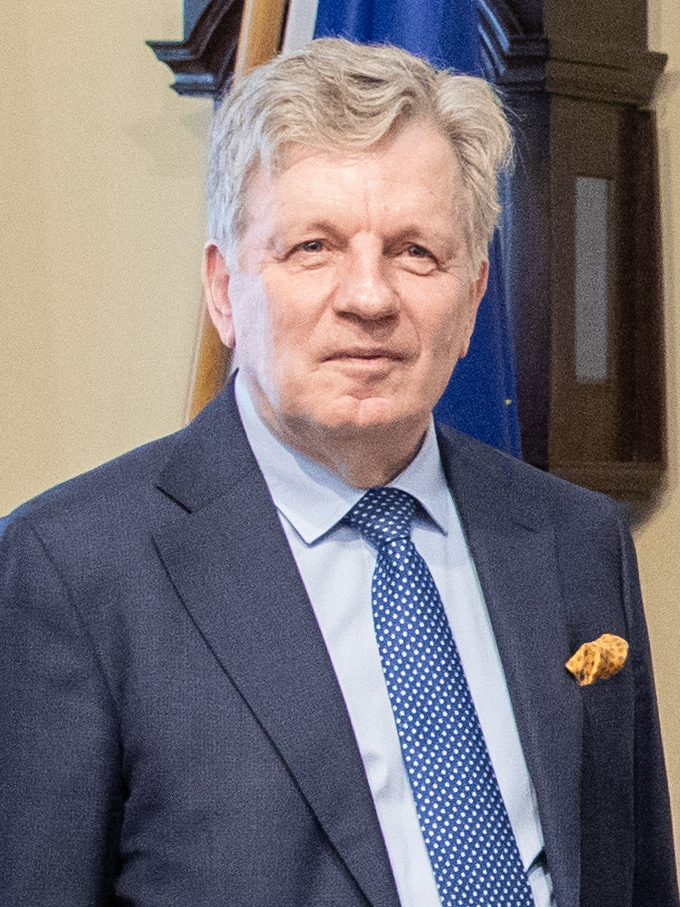
- Esko Aho in 2022

37th Prime Minister of Finland
- In office 26 April 1991 – 13 April 1995
- President: Mauno Koivisto; Martti Ahtisaari
- Deputy: Ilkka Kanerva; Pertti Salolainen
- Preceded by: Harri Holkeri
- Succeeded by: Paavo Lipponen

Personal details
- Born: Esko Tapani Aho; 20 May 1954 (age 72) Veteli, Finland
- Party: Centre
- Spouse: Kirsti Aho
- Profession: Master of Political Sciences, Visiting Professor at Sciences Po, Paris

Esko Tapani Aho (born 20 May 1954) is a Finnish politician who was prime minister of Finland from 1991 to 1995.

== Early life and career ==
Aho was born in Veteli, Finland. Prior to attending university, he began a career in politics. From 1974 to 1979, he was chairman of the Finnish Centre Youth, many of whose previous chairmen had risen to high political positions. In 1978, he became a presidential elector, a position he also held in 1982 and 1998. From 1979 to 1980, Aho was political secretary of the Ministry of Foreign Affairs. From 1980 to 1983, he was a trade promoter for the municipality of Kannus.

Aho studied at the University of Helsinki, graduating with a Master of Social Science degree in 1981.

Since 2010, he has been a member of the board of the Skolkovo Innovation Center. Currently, he is a visiting professor at Sciences Po, Paris.

== Parliamentary career ==
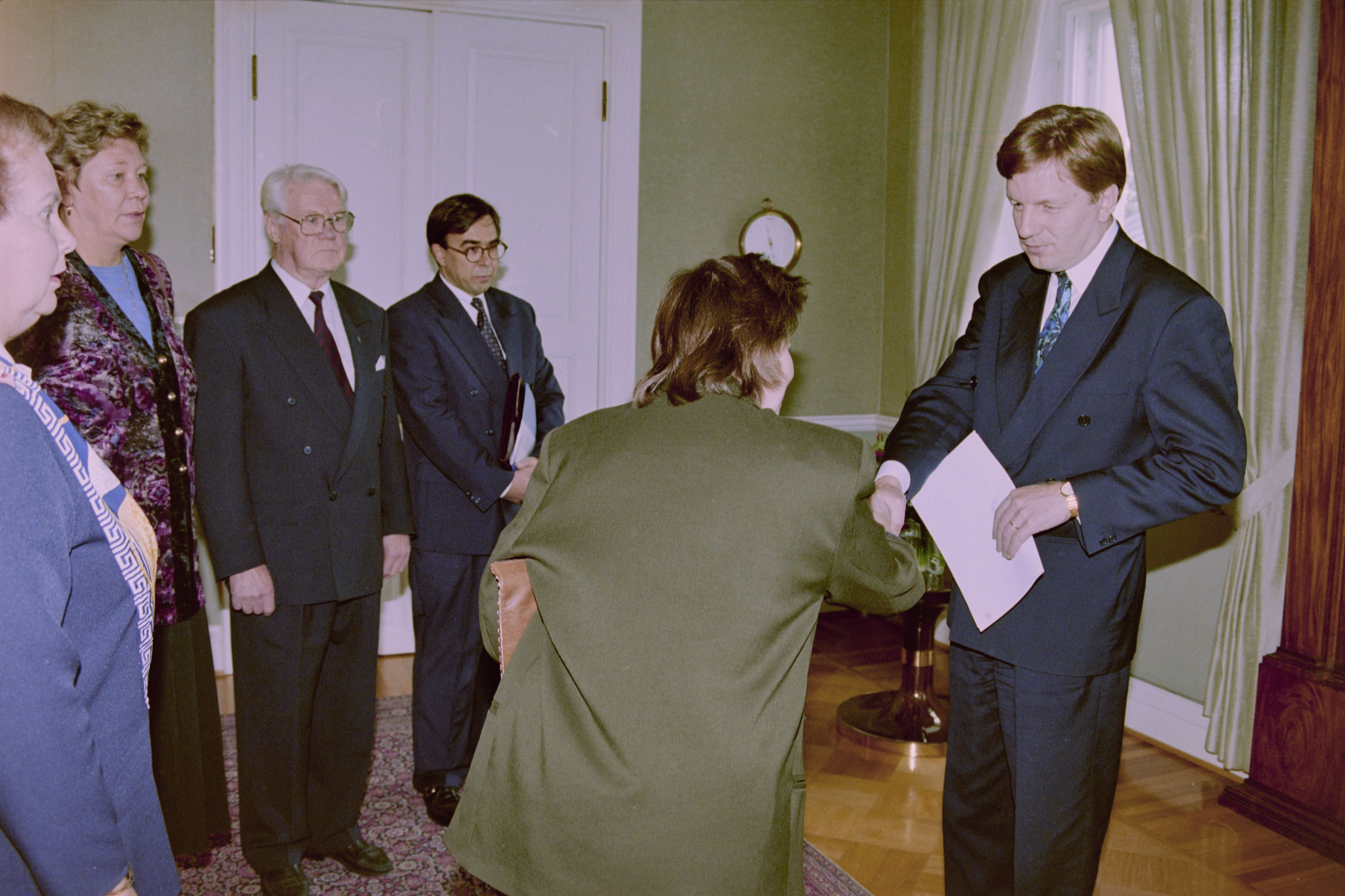
Esko Aho in 1993

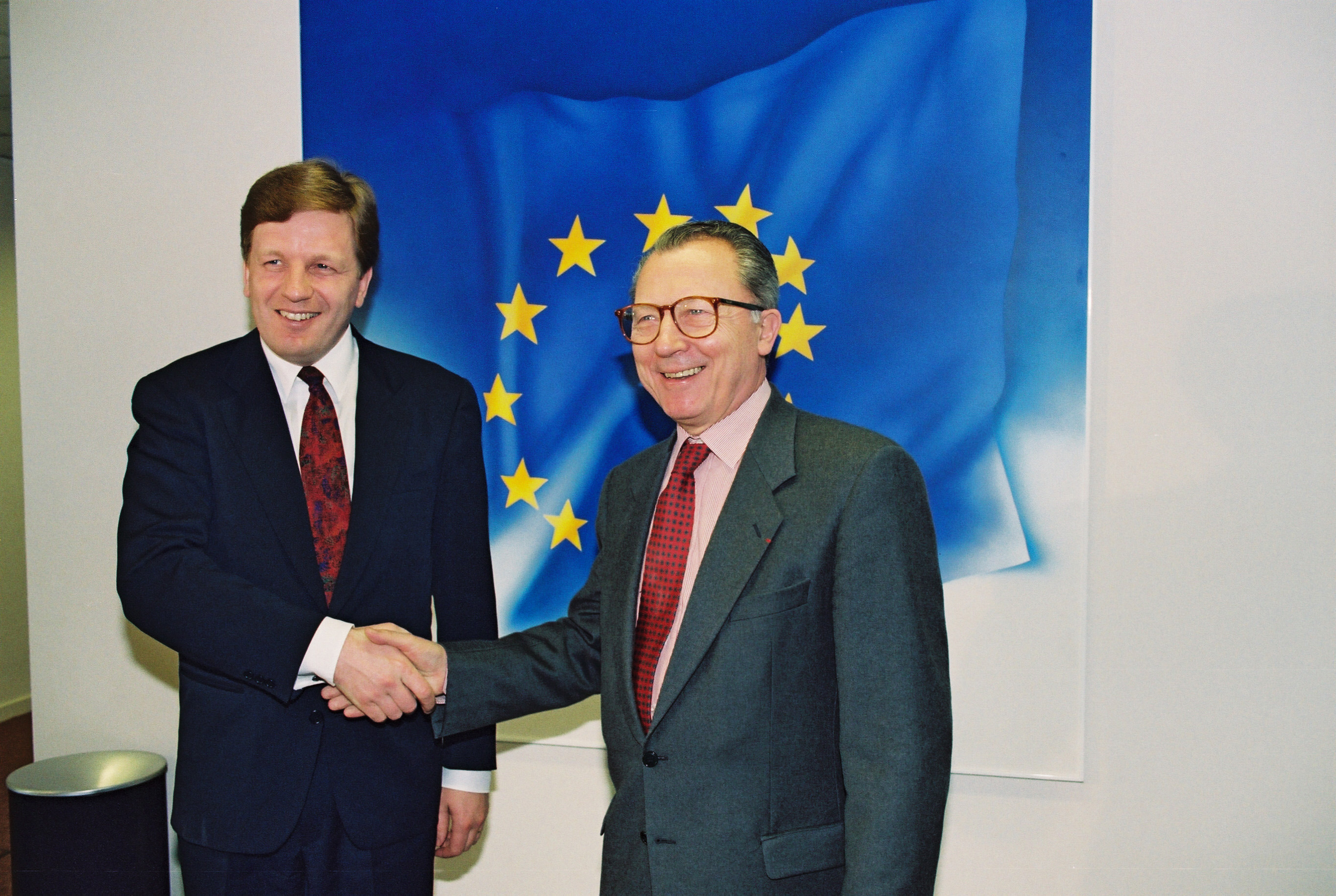
Esko Aho and Jacques Delors in 1994

Aho was first elected to the Finnish Parliament (eduskunta) in 1983. He became chairman of the Centre Party in 1990, a position that he held until 2002. The party was at the time one of three major political parties in Finland.

At 36 years of age, he was the youngest prime minister in Finnish history.

Aho was the prime minister of a centre-right coalition government (Centre Party, National Coalition Party, Christian Democrats and Swedish People's Party) from 1991 to 1995. He is best known for leading Finland into the European Union. Aho's own party, most of whose voters lived and live in rural areas, was the most opposed to EU membership among major parties. The greatest concern of these voters was the EU's effect on Finnish agriculture, but they were persuaded to support membership due to the prime minister's diplomacy. Finland applied for EU membership on 16 March 1992, and a referendum was held two and a half years later. Aho's government also faced the deep economic depression of the early 1990s. Despite a steep rise in the national debt, the Aho government applied a stringent policy of austerity that made it unpopular. This partly caused its fall in the 1995 election and the Centre Party's eight-year period in the opposition.

Aho had the nickname "Kennedy of Kannus" Kannus being his hometown) due to his streamlined and well coiffed habitus reminiscent of John F. Kennedy.

Esko Aho lost the bid for President of Finland to Tarja Halonen in 2000. He subsequently retired from active politics, initially in the form of a "sabbatical leave" of one year, during which he led a study group on the EU in the 2000 fall semester at Harvard University (where he was a resident fellow at the Institute of Politics). In the 2003 election he left parliament and retired from daily politics. He then served as the president of the Finnish national innovation fund SITRA (the Finnish National Fund for Research and Development).

In 2008, Aho's name was included in an opinion poll on possible presidential candidates, in which he ranked last.

On 1 November 2008, Aho became Nokia's executive vice president of corporate relations and responsibility and became a member of its executive board.

At the time of his rise to prime minister, he was the youngest head of government in Europe.

== In Russia ==
Aho served on the board of the Russian bank Sberbank from 2016 until his resignation in February 2022 following Russia's full-scale invasion of Ukraine. From 2010 to 2017, he participated in Nokia's cooperation with the Skolkovo Innovation Center. He also taught at the Russian Presidential Academy of National Economy and Public Administration until 2021.

Aho advocated continued economic cooperation between Finland and Russia and criticized the emphasis placed on Western sanctions. He described his activities as efforts to promote technological modernization, dialogue and mutual economic interdependence. Critics argued that his roles and public statements benefited Russian interests and helped legitimize state-linked institutions, despite Russia's annexation of Crimea in 2014 and subsequent invasion of Ukraine in 2022.

== Honors ==
- Order of the White Rose of Finland (Finland, 1992)
- Order of the Cross of Terra Mariana (Estonia, 2003)
- Order of Merit of the Italian Republic (Italy, 1993)

== Cabinets ==
- Aho Cabinet

== See also ==
- Aho report

Political offices
| Preceded by Kalevi Sorsa | Speaker of the Parliament of Finland; April 1991 | Succeeded by Ilkka Suominen |
| Preceded by Harri Holkeri | Prime Minister of Finland; 1991–1995 | Succeeded by Paavo Lipponen |
