= Pertti Salolainen =

Finnish politician (born 1940)

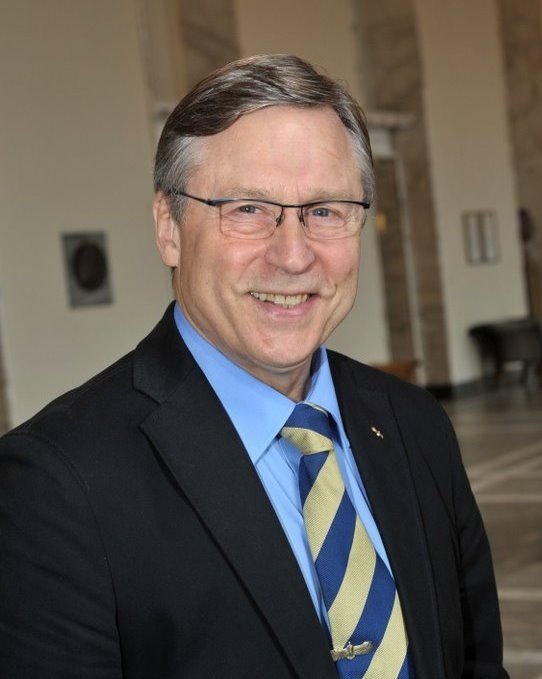
Salolainen in 2011

Pertti Edvard Salolainen CBE (born 19 October 1940) is a Finnish politician. He has served as MP from the National Coalition Party (1970–1996, 2007–2019) and party chairman (1991–1994) and Minister (1987–1995).

Salolainen worked before the MP career in Finnish Broadcasting Company between 1962 and 1969 as a journalist and producer. Between 1996 and 2004, he was the Finnish Ambassador in London.

== Career ==
Salolainen was born on 19 October 1940 in Helsinki during the Interim Peace period to the family of sergeant Edvard Salolainen and the shopkeeper Ella Salolainen (née Lundqvist).

He graduated as Master of Science in Economics from the Helsinki School of Economics in 1969.

Salolainen began his career as a Finnish Broadcasting Company's television newsreader and editor in 1962–1965. He was a producer of Finnish Broadcasting Company's financial programs from 1965 to 1966, BBC World Service Finnish language editorial editor in London in 1966 and Finnish Broadcasting Company's correspondent in London from 1966 to 1969.

== Politics ==
Salolainen was elected to the Parliament of Finland for the first time in the 1970 parliamentary elections. In Parliament, he served as Deputy Chairman of the Social Committee (1970–1975) and Chairman of the Finance Committee (1979–1987). Salolainen was also a member of the Helsinki City Council between 1972 and 1984.

Salolainen served as Minister for Foreign Affairs in the Holkeri Government, and Minister of Trade and Industry (Foreign Trade Minister) in 1987–1991.

He was a questioned publicity in 1989, being visiting China as the first Western official guest after the massacre of Tiananmein Square. The decision to travel to China was made by the government and had the approval from President Mauno Koivisto.

Salolainen continued as Foreign Trade Minister and Deputy Prime Minister of Finland between 1991 and 1995 in the Aho Government In the early 1990s, he was responsible for the Finnish membership negotiations in the European Union.

Salolainen was Chairman of the European Economic Area's negotiating delegation from 1990 to 1993 and chairman of the Finnish EU negotiating delegation and negotiating minister 1993–1995.

Salolainen has later told that he and other ministers had gotten death treats at the time, when Finland negotiated the membership in the EU. He has told later that he was under the protection of Finnish Security Intelligence Service because the death threats were considered serious.

In 1991 Salolainen was elected as the Chairman of the National Coalition Party after Ilkka Suominen. He was in charged until 1994 when he was succeeded by Sauli Niinistö. Salolainen left the Parliament in October 1996 after he was appointed as the Finland's Ambassador to London. He Ambassador under 2004. He was replaced in Parliament by Pirjo-Riitta Antvuori.

=== Return to politics in 2004 ===
In the 2007 parliamentary elections, Salolainen became a candidate, by the wish from party's chairman Jyrki Katainen, from Helsinki, even though he had already refused the candidacy

He returned to the Parliament from Helsinki as National Coalition Party's candidate with the fourth highest number of votes (8,621 votes) In his previous election, Salolainen had been the highest vote getter.

In the 2011 parliamentary elections, Salolainen was elected for a further term of 6, 205 votes

== Honors ==
Salolainen has long been involved in the WWF. He served as the supervisory board of the WWF's Finnish Fund and the vice-chairman of the Fund from 1972 to 1989.

London City granted Salolainen the Honorary Freemen of the City of London status in 1998. In Finland, he was awarded the Minister honorary title in 2004. Salolainen has also been awarded Order of the Lion of Finland and the Finnish Association for Nature Conservation's golden badge

In the 2017 Special Honours, Queen Elizabeth II awarded Salolainen as Honorary Commander of the Order of the British Empire (CBE).

== Allegation of antisemitism ==
In 2012, Salolainen said on a television program that the United States cannot take a neutral stance on the Israeli–Palestinian conflict due to the outsized influence of American Jews in domestic media and finance. The Simon Wiesenthal Center demanded Salolainen's removal from office, arguing Salolainen had echoed an antisemitic trope. Salolainen denied that his comment was antisemitic.
