= Tuulikki Hämäläinen =

Finnish politician (1940–2023)

Member of the Parliament of Finland for Uusimaa
- In office 26 March 1983 – 23 March 1999

Personal details
- Born: Tuulikki Ojala; 25 November 1940 Helsinki, Finland
- Died: 23 October 2023 (aged 82)
- Party: SDP
- Occupation: Economist

Tuulikki Hämäläinen (née Ojala; 25 November 1940 – 23 October 2023) was a Finnish economist and politician. A member of the Social Democratic Party, she served in the Parliament from 1983 to 1999.

Hämäläinen died on 23 October 2023, at the age of 82.
