= Matti Puhakka =

Finnish politician (1945–2021)

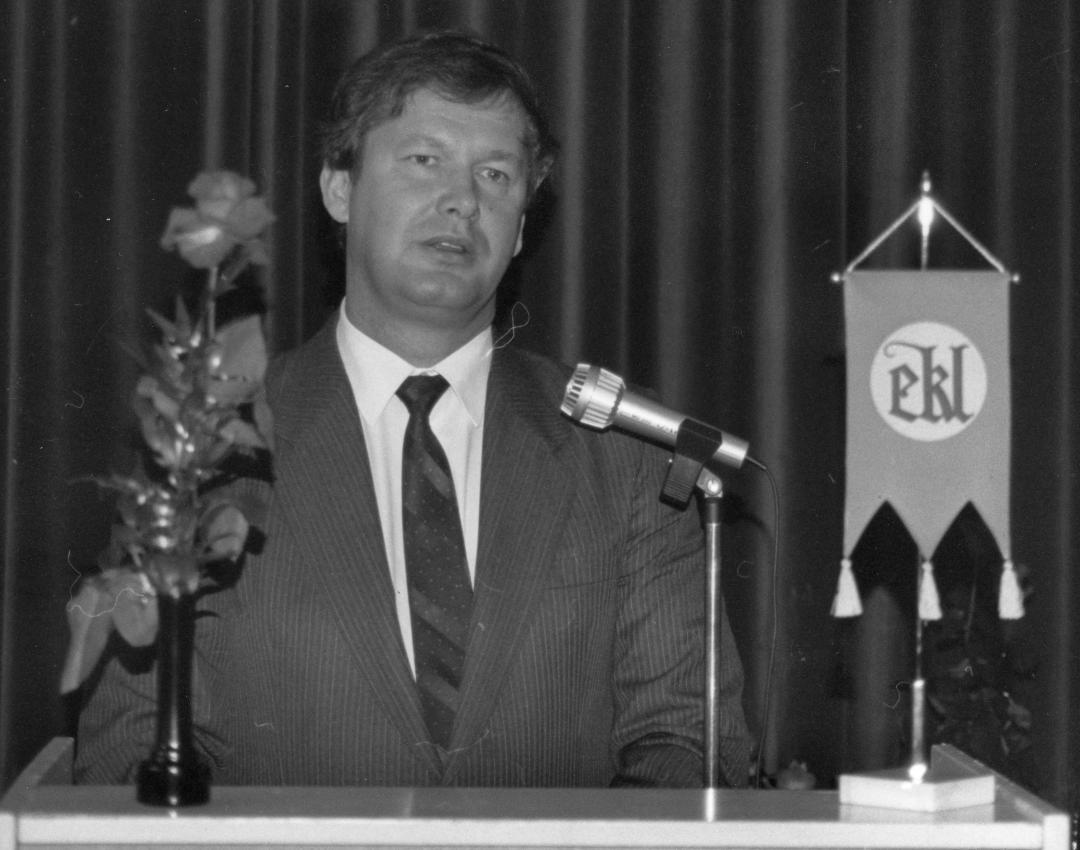
Matti Juhani Puhakka

Matti Juhani Puhakka (7 February 1945 – 6 October 2021) was a Finnish politician representing the Social Democrats.

Puhakka was born in Eno in February 1945. Before his political career, from 1965 to 1975, he worked as maintenance repairman in the Enso Gutzeit factory in Uimaharju.

He was Finland's Minister of Transport from 1983 to 1984 and Minister of Social Affairs and Health from 1984 to 1987 in the Sorsa IV Cabinet. In the Holkeri Cabinet (1987–1991) he was Minister of Labor from 1987 to 1991. He was elected to the Finnish Parliament for two periods: 1975–1991 and 1995–1996.

In 1996 he was chosen as one of the managers in KELA, and he retired in 2010.

He died on 6 October 2021, at the age of 76.
