= Christoffer Taxell =

Finland Swedish politician and businessman

Lars Evald Christoffer Taxell
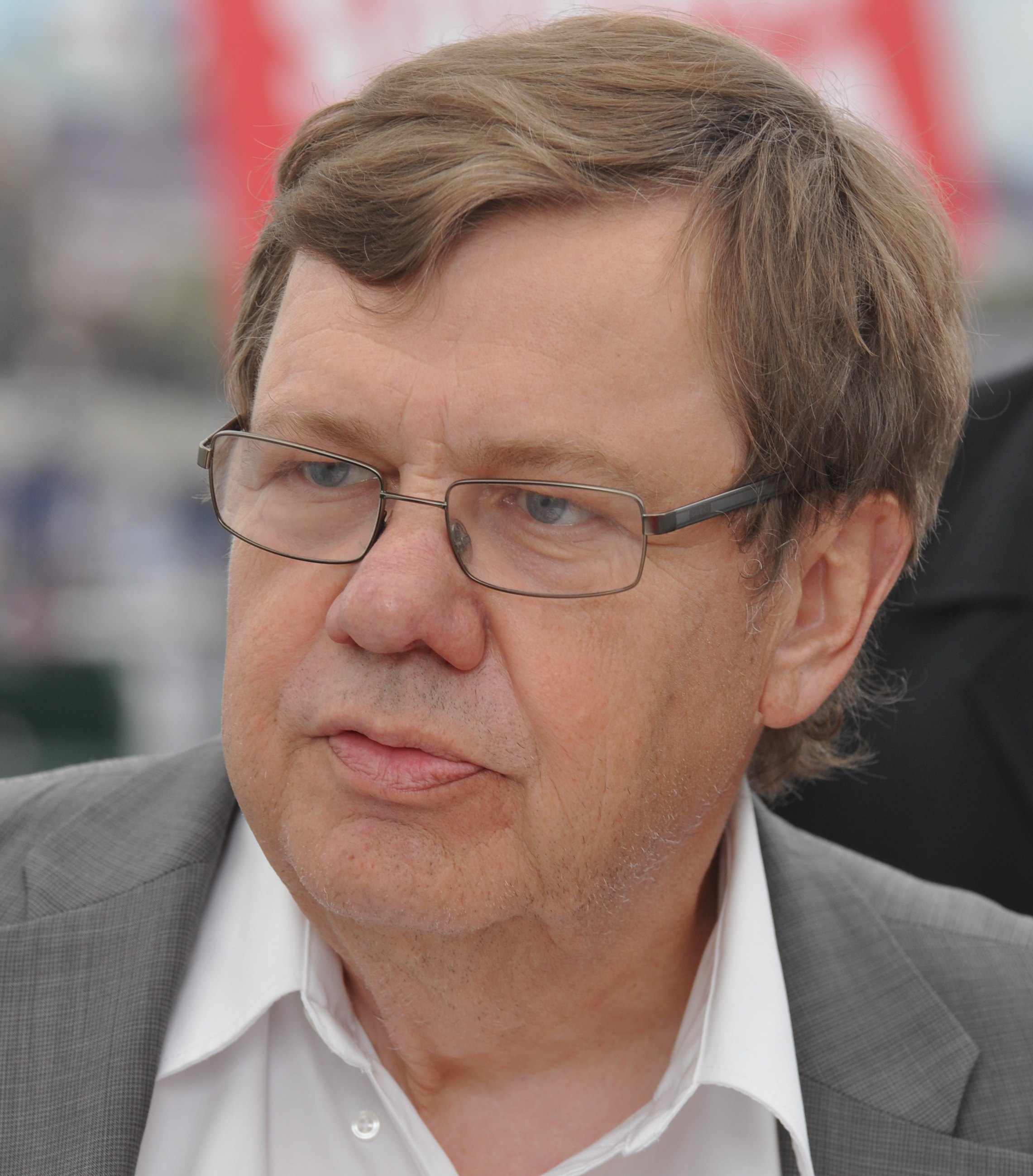
- Born: July 14, 1948 (age 78); Turku, Finland
- Education: University of Turku
- Occupations: Politician, businessman, university chancellor

Lars Evald Christoffer Taxell (born July 14, 1948, in Turku, Finland) is a Finland Swedish politician, business leader and former chancellor of Åbo Akademi University. He is known in Finland as a decision-maker in Finland Swedish politics, economics and culture. In 2009, he was chosen by the newspaper Iltalehti as the third most influential decision-maker in the Finnish economy after Björn Wahlroos and Antti Herlin.

== Life and work ==
Taxell was a member of the Swedish People's Party of Finland from 1975 to 1991 and was chairman of the party from 1985 to 1990. Taxell served as Minister of Justice from 1979 to 1987 in the cabinets of Mauno Koivisto and Kalevi Sorsa, after which he was Minister of Education in the Holkeri Cabinet from 1987 to 1990. Taxell's term of office lasted 4,037 consecutive days (11 years).

From 1990 to 2002, Taxell was the CEO of Partek and from 2005 to 2006 he was the chairman of the Confederation of Finnish Industries. Taxell has also served as chairman of the Board of Finnair and as a member of the boards of EFFOA Byggproduktindustrin, ABB, Merita bank, Sampo, Varma-Sampo, KCI Konecranes, Wärtsilä (Metra), Kalmar Industries, Raisio Group, Nordkalk, Hormos Medical, Boliden, Lifim and Skandia.

Outside the corporate world, Taxell has served as chancellor of Åbo Akademi University, among others. He was also the chairman of the board of the Stiftelsen för Åbo Akademi and Föreningen Konstsamfundet rf. Taxell is the chairman of the Board of the University Alliance and headed the foundation for the European Capital of Culture in Turku in 2011.

Taxell's father, Lars Erik Taxell, also served as chairman of the Swedish People's Party of Finland. Taxell graduated with a bachelor's degree in law from the University of Turku in 1972.

== Taxell's Paradox ==
In Finnish-Swedish language policy discourse, Christoffer Taxell is often attributed a central concept of the long-term viability of bilingual services and institutions, often referred to as Taxell's Paradox (in Swedish Taxellska paradoxen). The concept claims that monolingual (Swedish) solutions best ensure bilingualism, while bilingual solutions lead to monolingualism. The thinking is based on the observation that the position of the Swedish language in environments such as schools is subordinated to the majority language Finnish for practical and social reasons, despite the positive characteristics associated with mutual language learning.

The origin of the term is said to be an inaugural speech in 1985 at the South Ostrobothnia Vocational School (in Swedish Sydösterbottens yrkesskola). Taxell himself does not consider the term to be described as a paradox or attributed to him, but refers to repeated experiences during Finland's independence period.
