= Mauno Forsman =

Finnish politician (1928–2006)

Mauno Veikko Forsman (1928-2006) was a Finnish politician (Social Democrat), Member of Parliament 1971-1983 He was a deputy Minister of Finance 1981–1982.

From 1983 to 1987 he was the chairman of Finland's Bandy Association.
