= Ilkka Suominen =

Finnish politician (1939–2022)

Ministeri (Minister) Ilkka Suominen
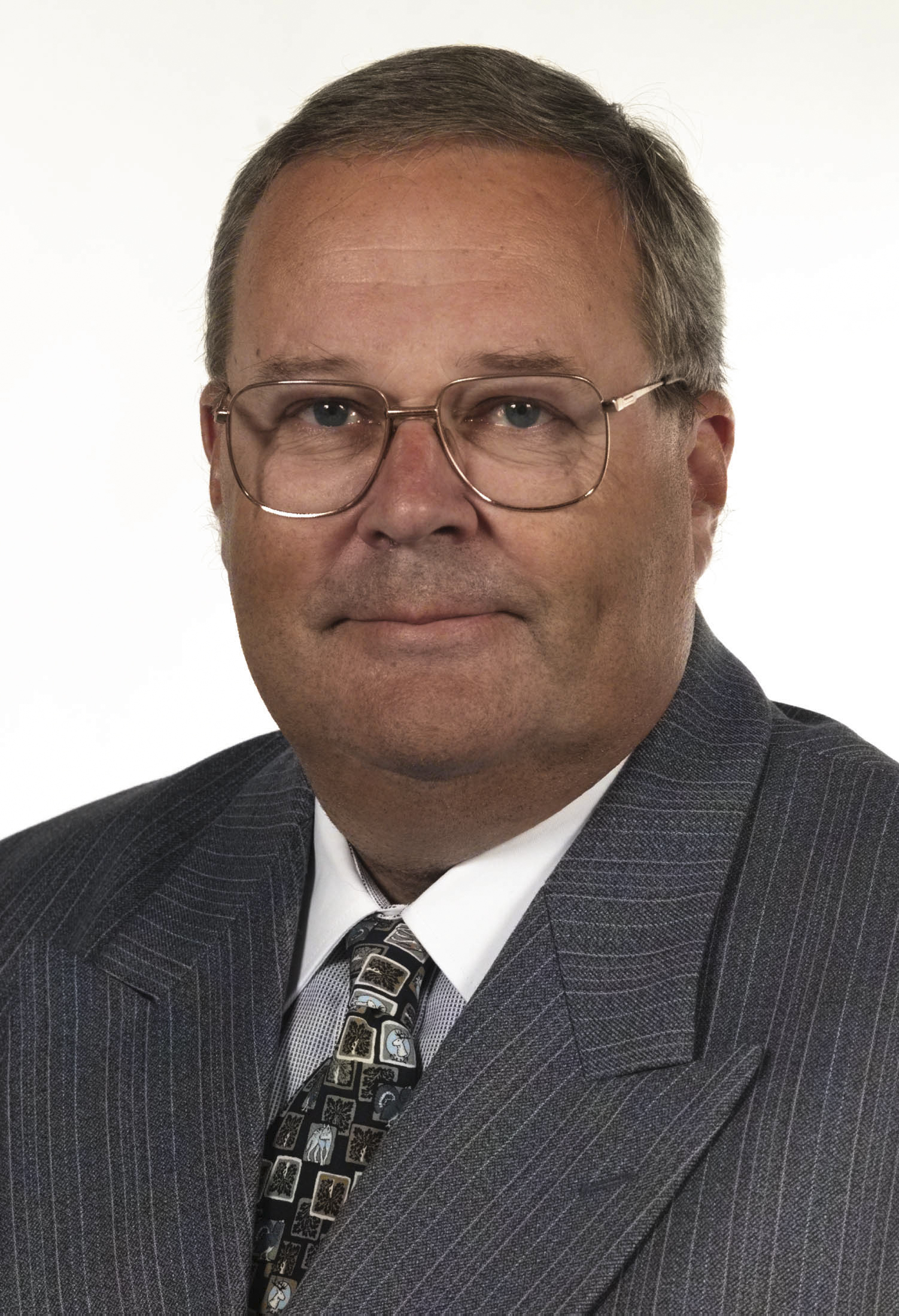
- Suominen in 1999

Speaker of the Parliament of Finland
- In office 2 April 1987 – 5 May 1987
- Preceded by: Erkki Pystynen
- Succeeded by: Matti Ahde
- In office 30 April 1991 – 6 February 1993
- Preceded by: Esko Aho
- Succeeded by: Riitta Uosukainen

President of the Nordic Council
- In office 1992–1992
- Preceded by: Anker Jørgensen
- Succeeded by: Jan P. Syse

Personal details
- Born: 8 April 1939 Nakkila, Finland
- Died: 23 May 2022 (aged 83)
- Party: National Coalition Party
- Spouse: Riitta Suominen

Ilkka Olavi Suominen (8 April 1939 – 23 May 2022) was a Finnish politician from the National Coalition Party. He was President of the Nordic Council in 1992.

He was a member of the parliament from 1970 to 1975 and from 1983 to 1994. Suominen was the chairman of the National Coalition Party 1979–1991 and twice the speaker of the parliament 1987 and 1991–1994. He held the position of minister of trade and industry in Holkeri cabinet 1987–1991. Suominen left parliament to become CEO of state monopoly Alko. He was elected as a member of the European Parliament (MEP) for one term between 1999 and 2004 (EPP).

He was also the chairman of the Parliamentary Assembly of the OSCE 1992–1994.

== See also ==
- Bilderberg Group

Political offices
| Preceded by Erkki Pystynen | Speaker of the Parliament of Finland; 1987 | Succeeded by Matti Ahde |
| Preceded by Esko Aho | Speaker of the Parliament of Finland; 1991-1993 | Succeeded by Riitta Uosukainen |
