= Ole Norrback =

Finland-Swedish politician and diplomat

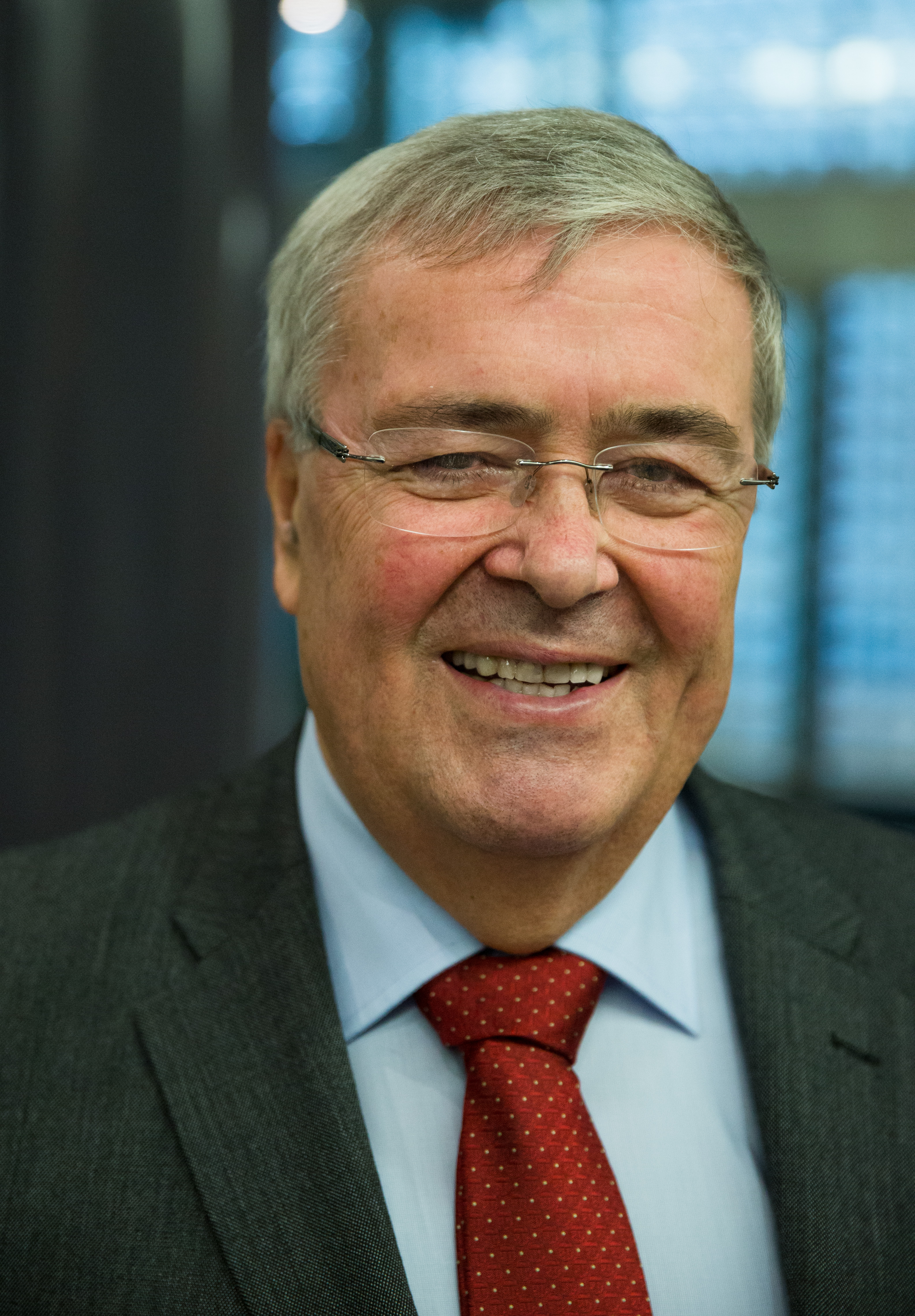

Johan Ole Norrback (born 18 March 1941) is a Finland-Swedish politician and diplomat.

Norrback was born in Övermark. He graduated as a primary school teacher in 1965 and was the ombudsman for the Sfp, Swedish People's Party in Ostrobothnia between 1967 and 1971, and ombudsman for the Swedish Ostrobothnia's Regional authority 1971 and 1989. He was member of the Finnish parliament 1979-1987 and 1991–1999, and the chairman of the SFP Parliament group between 1983 and 1987 and Party leader of the SPP between 1990 and 1998.

Norrback joined the government as the Minister of Defence in 1987, he was a Minister of Education 1990 to 1991, Minister to the Ministry of Agriculture from 1987 to 1991, Minister of Transport and Communication 1991 to 1995, Europe and Foreign Trade Minister 1995 to 1999, and Minister of Nordic Cooperation 1991 to 1999. Thereafter he left the politics and became a diplomat. He was ambassador to Oslo 1999 to 2003, and was appointed ambassador to Athens in 2003 to 2007. Norrback was a minister for 4,370 days.

He was given the honorary title "Minister" in 2006 by President Tarja Halonen. Since 2007 he has devoted himself to removing border obstacles among the Nordic countries. He chairs the Nordic Council of Ministers' Freedom of Movement Forum. The workgroup, which reports to the Nordic prime ministers, has had its mandate extended until 2013.

== Sources ==
- CV of Ole Norrback

Political offices
Preceded by Veikko Pihlajamäki	Finnish Minister of Defence; 1987–1990	Succeeded by Elisabeth Rehn
Party political offices
Preceded by Christoffer Taxell	Chairman of the Swedish People's Party; 1990–1998	Succeeded by Jan-Erik Enestam
