= Kaarina Suonio =

Finnish politician and psychologist (born 1941)

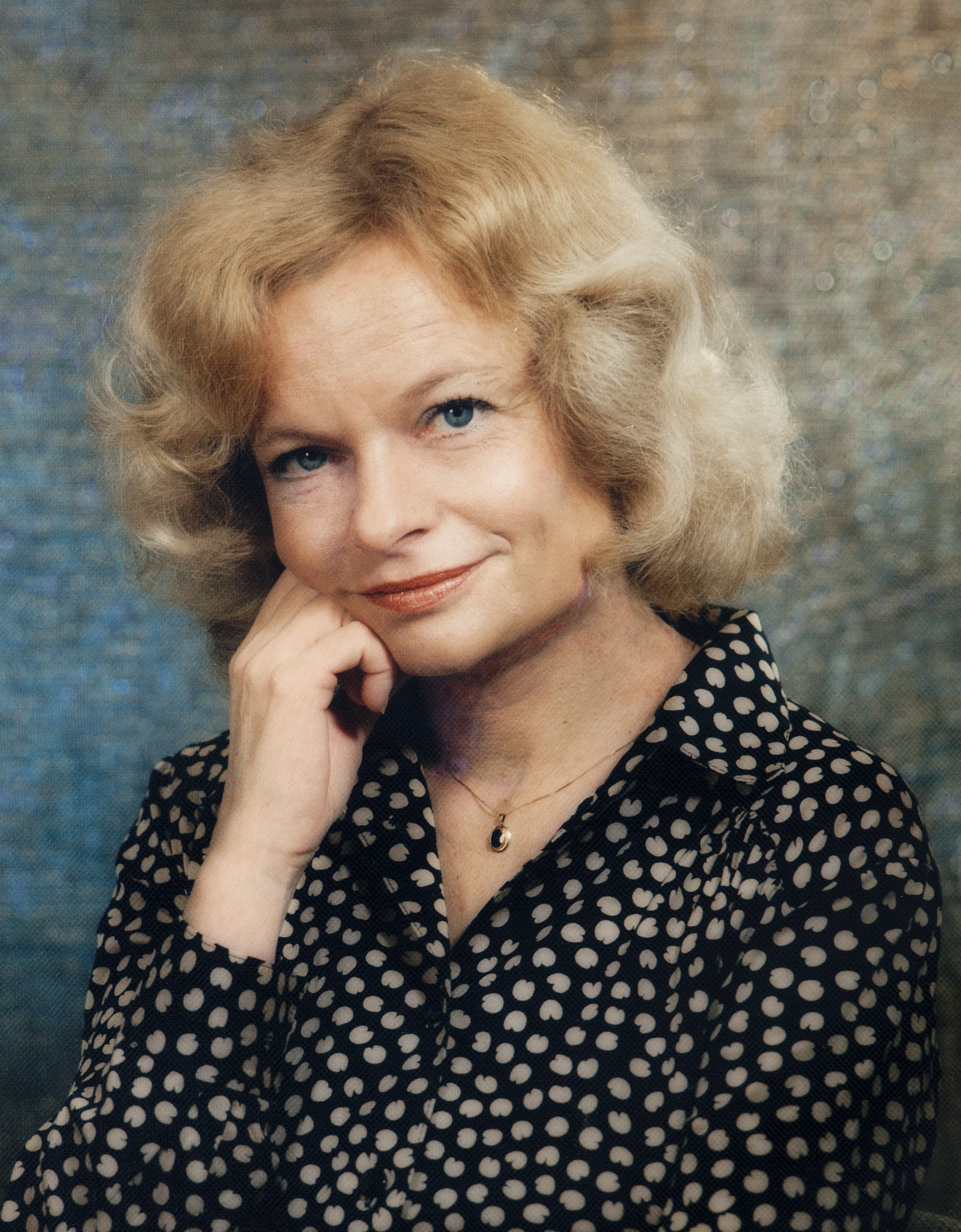
- Suonio in 1986

Member of the Parliament of Finland
- In office 27 September 1975 – 31 July 1986
- Constituency: Helsinki

Finland Minister of Education
- In office 31 December 1982 – 31 May 1986
- Prime Minister: Kalevi Sorsa

Personal details
- Born: Kaarina Elisabeth Brusiin; 7 February 1941 (age 85) Helsinki, Finland
- Education: University of Helsinki

Kaarina Elisabeth Suonio (née Brusiin; born 7 February 1941) is a Finnish retired politician and psychologist. She represented Helsinki in the Parliament of Finland from 1975 to 1986 as a member of the Social Democratic Party. From 1982 to 1986, she was Finland's minister of education, and from 1994 to 1997, she was the last governor of Häme Province prior to its merger with other provinces.

== Early life and education ==
Kaarina Elisabeth Brusiin was born on 7 February 1941 in Helsinki, Finland. Her father was Otto Brusiin, a legal scholar and professor. She graduated from the Apollo Coeducational School in Helsinki in 1959 and received the Master of Arts degree in psychology from the University of Helsinki in 1964. She later received the Bachelor of Laws degree from the University of Helsinki in 1978.

== Career ==
=== Early career and psychologist ===
During her undergraduate studies at the University of Helsinki, Suonio worked as a library assistant at the Helsinki City Library. From 1963 to 1971, she worked at the Finnish Institute of Occupational Health as a psychologist. During this time, she also taught psychology and education in the Finnish prison service, where she worked as an organisational researcher from 1971 to 1975. Additionally, Suonio was a lecturer at the University of Helsinki in the 1970s and worked on various television programs about mental health. Her appearance on programs hosted by journalist Erno Paasilinna made her well-known in Finland.

=== Political career ===
Suonio was a member of the City Council of Helsinki from 1973 to 1984. In 1975, she was elected to the Parliament of Finland to represent the constituency of Helsinki as a member of the Social Democratic Party (SDP). After Suonio was re-elected in 1979, she was the vice chair of the Legal Affairs Committee until 1982 as well as the vice chair of the SDP parliamentary group from 1981 to 1982. In Parliament, she opposed a free trade agreement between Finland and the European Economic Community; she later said in a 2021 interview that she regretted her opposition.

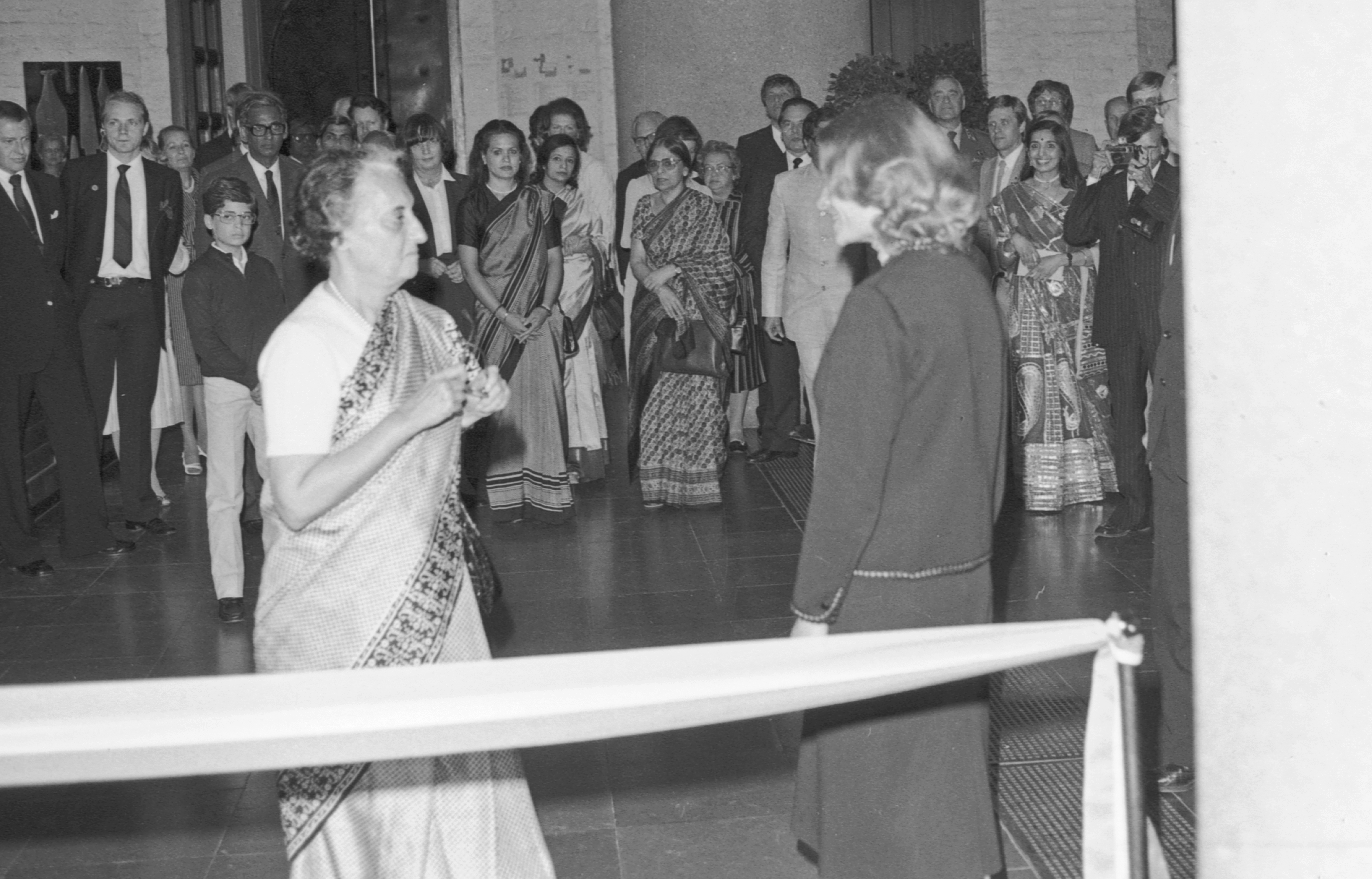
Suonio with Indian Prime Minister Indira Gandhi in 1983

In February 1982, Prime Minister Kalevi Sorsa appointed Suonio as Finland's minister of culture, a deputy position in the Ministry of Education and Culture. She was promoted to Minister of Education in December 1982 and held the position until 1986. As minister, she worked on legislation to build or renovate cultural facilities in Finland, including a new opera house and the Ateneum art museum. Suonio's duties included overseeing government funding of Finnish sports, and she opposed Finland's participation in the South African Grand Prix in the 1980s due to South Africa's policy of apartheid. She unsuccessfully attempted to stop Keke Rosberg from competing in the 1985 Grand Prix, saying that she wanted to "make sure the Finnish national anthem may not be played in a country which supports apartheid".

Suonio left Parliament in July 1986 to become the deputy mayor of education, culture, and youth in Tampere, a position she held until 1992. As deputy mayor, she took part in the world's first GSM call in 1991 when former prime minister Harri Holkeri called her using the new technology. From 1993 to 2007, she sat on the High Court of Impeachment of Finland. In 1994, she became the governor of Häme Province and was the last provincial governor of Häme before it was merged with other provinces in 1997.

=== Other activities ===
In the late 1990s, Suonio was involved in several anti-racism groups, including chairing a national Delegation Against Racism and serving as a member of the management board of the European Monitoring Centre on Racism and Xenophobia. From 1997 to 2004, Suonio was the managing director of Tampere Hall, the largest concert and congress centre in the Nordic countries. In 2005, she was elected as the chair of Finland Festivals, a nonprofit organisation.

== See also ==
- List of Cabinet Ministers from Finland by ministerial portfolio
