= Matti Ahde =

Finnish politician (1945–2019)

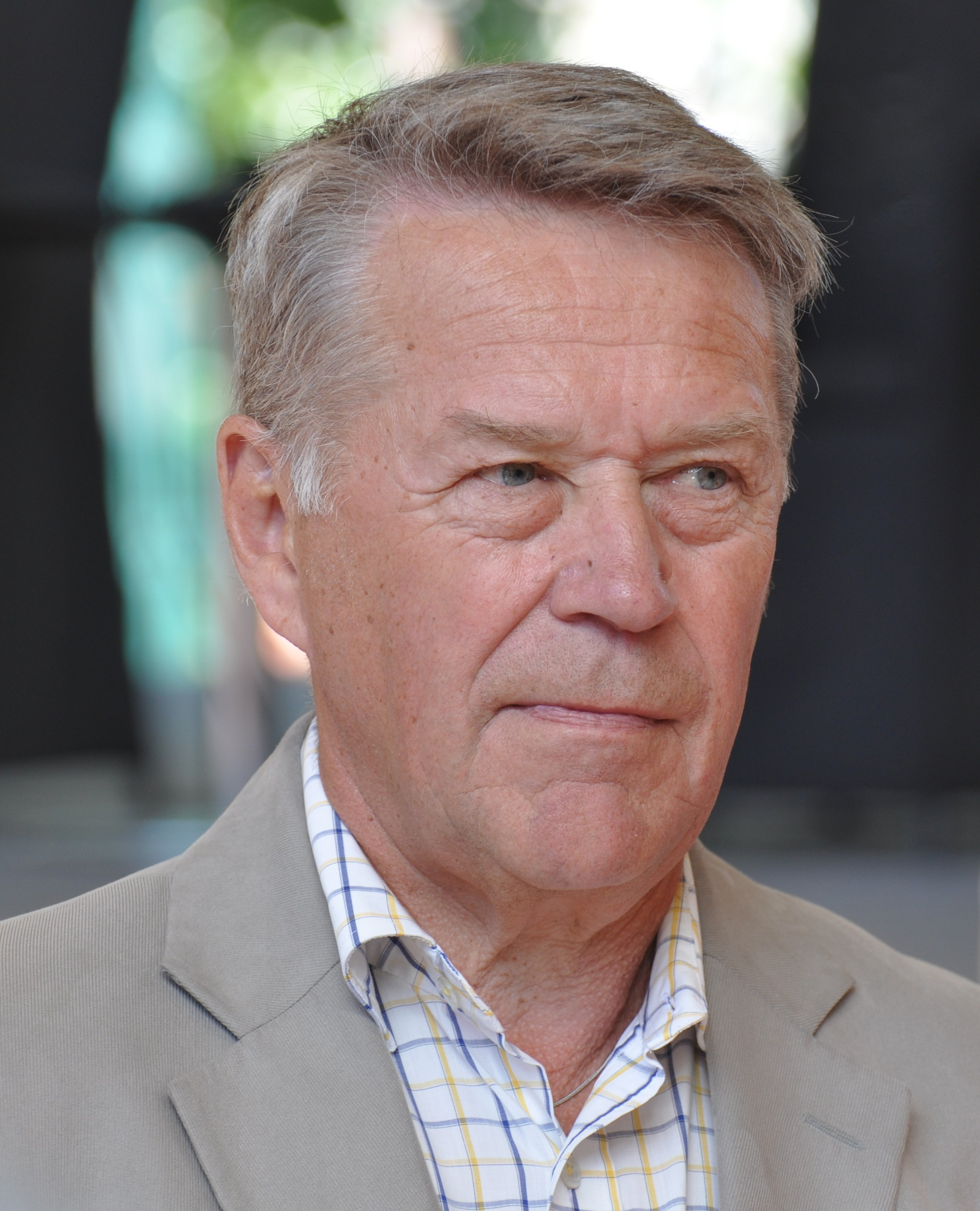

Speaker of the Parliament of Finland
- In office 8 May 1987 – 1 February 1989
- Preceded by: Ilkka Suominen
- Succeeded by: Kalevi Sorsa

Minister of the Interior
- In office 19 February 1982 – 30 September 1983
- Prime Minister: Kalevi Sorsa
- Preceded by: Eino Uusitalo
- Succeeded by: Matti Luttinen

Minister of Environment
- In office 1 October 1983 – 30 April 1987
- Prime Minister: Kalevi Sorsa
- Succeeded by: Kaj Bärlund

Member of the Parliament of Finland
- In office 16 March 1970 – 1990
- In office 16 March 2003 – 17 April 2011

Personal details
- Born: 23 December 1945 Oulu, Finland
- Died: 20 December 2019 (aged 73) Helsinki, Finland
- Party: Social Democratic Party
- Spouse: Hilkka Ahde

Matti Allan Ahde (23 December 1945 – 20 December 2019) was a Finnish politician from the Social Democratic Party.

Ahde was born in Oulu. He was a member of the parliament from 1970 to 1990, when he left to become CEO of the state monopoly Veikkaus. Ahde held minister posts in Sorsa's cabinets 1982–1987 and was elected Speaker of the Parliament in 1987. He was replaced as the speaker by Kalevi Sorsa in 1989 when Sorsa stepped down from Holkeri's cabinet to make the position available for party chairman Pertti Paasio.

Ahde quit as CEO of Veikkaus in 2001 and was re-elected to the parliament in 2003.

On 20 December 2019, Ahde died of pancreatic cancer at his home in Helsinki, Finland.

Political offices
Preceded by Ilkka Suominen	Speaker of the Parliament of Finland; 1987–1989	Succeeded by Kalevi Sorsa
