= Kalevi Sorsa =

Finnish politician (1930–2004)

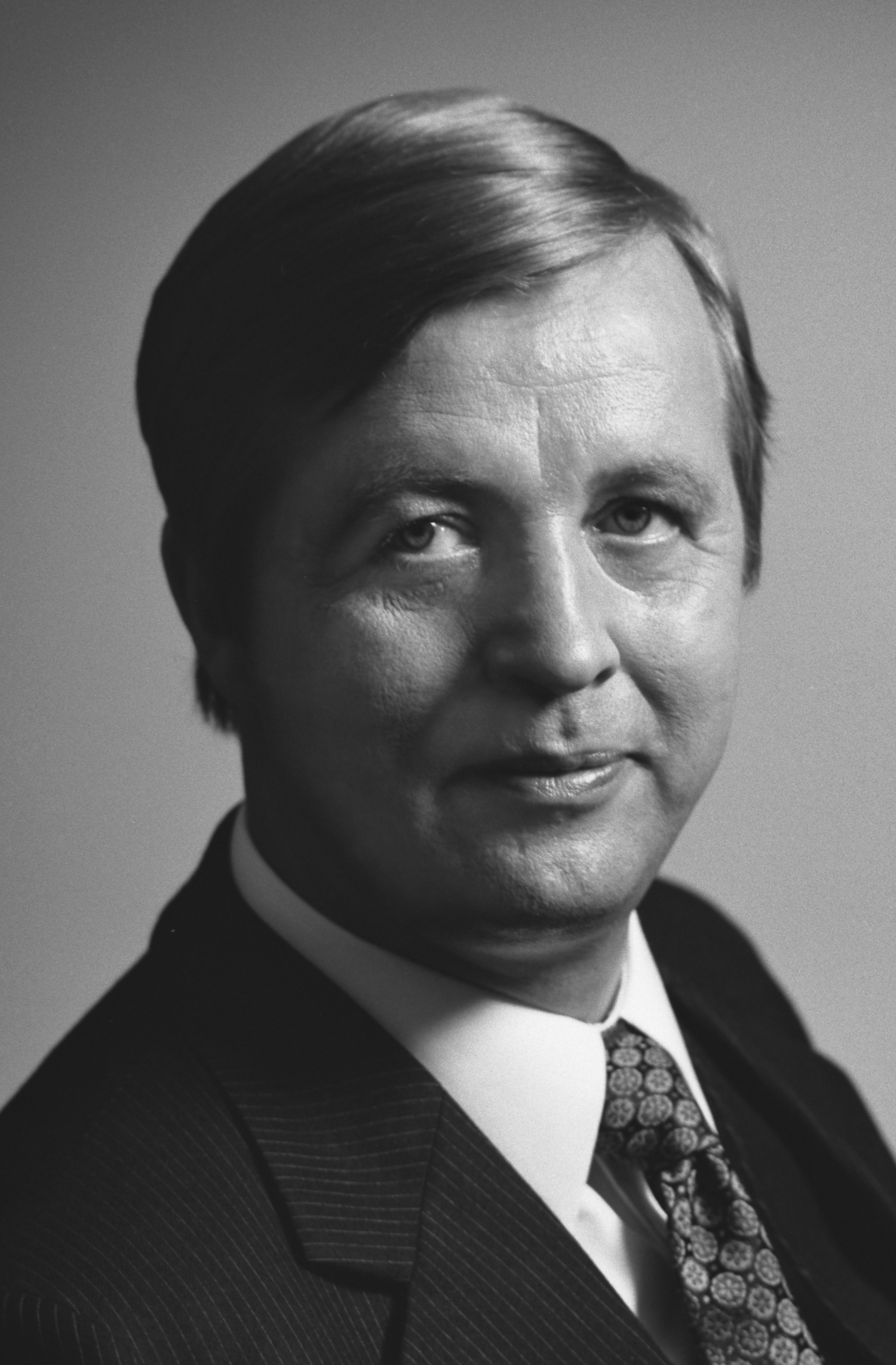
- Sorsa in 1975.

34th Prime Minister of Finland
- In office 19 February 1982 – 30 April 1987
- President: Mauno Koivisto
- Deputy: Ahti Pekkala; Paavo Väyrynen
- Preceded by: Mauno Koivisto
- Succeeded by: Harri Holkeri
- In office 15 May 1977 – 26 May 1979
- President: Urho Kekkonen
- Deputy: Johannes Virolainen
- Preceded by: Martti Miettunen
- Succeeded by: Mauno Koivisto
- In office 4 September 1972 – 13 June 1975
- President: Urho Kekkonen
- Deputy: Ahti Karjalainen
- Preceded by: Rafael Paasio
- Succeeded by: Keijo Liinamaa

Minister of Foreign Affairs
- In office 30 April 1987 – 31 January 1989
- Prime Minister: Harri Holkeri
- Preceded by: Paavo Väyrynen
- Succeeded by: Pertti Paasio
- In office 30 November 1975 – 29 September 1976
- Prime Minister: Martti Miettunen
- Preceded by: Olavi J. Mattila
- Succeeded by: Keijo Korhonen
- In office 23 February 1972 – 4 September 1972
- Prime Minister: Rafael Paasio
- Preceded by: Olavi J. Mattila
- Succeeded by: Ahti Karjalainen

Deputy Prime Minister of Finland
- In office 30 April 1987 – 31 January 1989
- Prime Minister: Harri Holkeri
- Preceded by: Paavo Väyrynen
- Succeeded by: Pertti Paasio
- In office 30 November 1975 – 29 September 1976
- Prime Minister: Martti Miettunen
- Preceded by: Olavi J. Mattila
- Succeeded by: Ahti Karjalainen

Personal details
- Born: Taisto Kalevi Sorsa; 21 December 1930 Keuruu, Finland
- Died: 16 January 2004 (aged 73) Helsinki, Finland
- Party: Social Democratic
- Spouse: Elli Irene Fate

Taisto Kalevi Sorsa (21 December 1930 – 16 January 2004) was a Finnish politician who served as Prime Minister of Finland three times: 1972–1975, 1977–1979 and 1982–1987. At the time of his death he still held the record for most days of incumbency as Finnish prime minister. He was also a long-time leader of the Social Democratic Party of Finland.

== Early years ==
Taisto Kalevi Sorsa was born on 21 December 1930 in Keuruu. Sorsa's surname literally means in Finnish: mallard.

Sorsa attended school in Jyväskylä and Lappeenranta. At the age of 18, Sorsa's involvement with the SDP started in Lappeenranta. Prior to his political career, Sorsa worked in Paris for UNESCO from 1959 to 1965 and served as Secretary-General of the Finnish UNESCO board from 1965 to 1969. In the late 1960s, he also served as an official in the Ministry of Education.

In 1969, he was brought in from relative obscurity by Rafael Paasio, a former Prime Minister of Finland, to assume the influential post of party secretary, despite not having much experience of national politics.

A 2008 book by historian Jukka Seppinen claimed that Sorsa was at this date already receiving support from Soviet backers in the KGB. However, other historians have disputed this, and while there was a list in a pro-Soviet newspaper of the candidates who should not be chosen as the party secretary, such as the right-wing social democrat Pekka J. Korvenheimo, there is no proof that the Soviets would have at this point particularly supported Sorsa.

== Prime Minister and Foreign Minister (1972–1989) ==
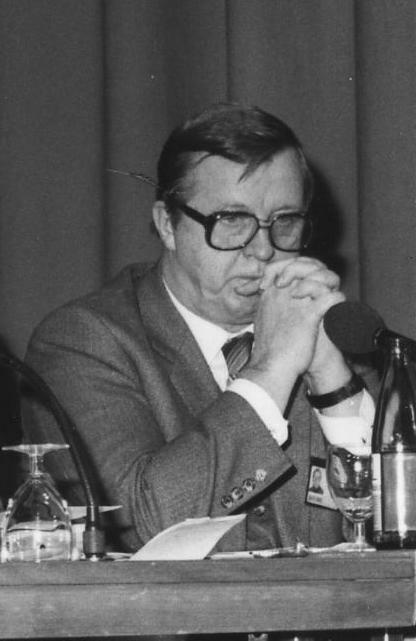
Kalevi Sorsa in January 1983, during his third and longest term as Prime Minister

=== Sorsa and domestic politics ===
Sorsa was a leading political figure during the presidencies of Kekkonen and Koivisto. He served as the chairman of the Social Democratic Party from 1975 to 1987 and was Prime Minister of Finland in four centre-left coalitions for a total of ten years (1972–1975, 1977–1979, 1982–1983, 1983–1987). He remains Finland's longest-serving prime minister.

After his premiership he served as the Speaker of the Finnish Parliament from 1989 to 1991. During his career he also served twice as Deputy Prime Minister, from 1975 to 1976 and from 1987 to 1989. From 1987 to 1996, Sorsa served on the governing board of the Bank of Finland. He was also known for his participation as the convener in the economic policy seminar at Hotel Korpilampi in Lahnus, Espoo, in September 1977.

Sorsa is regarded as one of Finland's most influential prime ministers, making major contributions to schools and health care, and increasing social security for families with children and pensioners. His governments strengthened the welfare state in Finland, by enacting many reforms—child care laws, longer maternity leave, the annual vacation benefit act, as well as the public health act.

In domestic politics, Sorsa had a particularly difficult relationship with Paavo Väyrynen, the strong-willed head of the Center Party. Another notable conflict was his rivalry with young rising politician Paavo Lipponen.

In June 1984, Sorsa gave a speech on "infocracy" (i.e. the power of the mass media) at the Social Democratic party convention. Infocracy challenges parliamentary democracy, is unintelligent and avoids discussing social problems, he said: it takes more interest in individual politicians than political issues and is never critical of its own actions.

=== Sorsa and foreign affairs ===
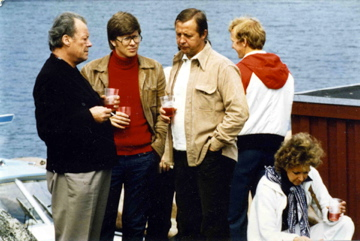
Willy Brandt visiting the Finnish Social Democratic Party leader Kalevi Sorsa in Finland in 1977

Three times Kalevi Sorsa served as Minister for Foreign Affairs (Finland): in 1972; in 1975–1976; and from 1987 to 1989.

Sorsa supported the Organization for Security and Co-operation in Europe after its creation in 1975, as well as projects to bridge the gap between the world's richest and poorest countries. In the 1970s, despite opposition from far-left parties, he championed a hard-won, free-trade agreement with the European Economic Community (EEC), which boosted ties between Finland and the countries of Western Europe.

Sorsa was also active in the international social democratic movement, and in the mid-1970s was elected vice-president of the Socialist International.

In the late 1970s and in the 1980s the Socialist International had extensive contacts and discussion with the two leading powers of the Cold War period, the United States and the Soviet Union, on issues concerning East–West relations, arms control and Afghanistan. The Socialist International supported détente and disarmament agreements, such as SALT II, START and INF. They had several meetings and discussion in Washington, D.C., with President Jimmy Carter and Vice-President George Bush and with CPSU Secretaries General Leonid Brezhnev and Mikhail Gorbachev in Moscow. Sorsa led the Socialist International's delegations to these discussions.

== Later years (1989–2004) ==
In 1993, Sorsa sought to become the Social Democratic Party's presidential candidate, but in the primary elections, which were exceptionally and controversially open to all Finns regardless of their party membership, he lost to his challenger Martti Ahtisaari, the Deputy Secretary-General of the United Nations from 1977 to 1981, who later also won the main presidential elections and went on to become the Finnish President. Although the social democratic primaries of 1993 have generally been seen as a disaster, as there was nobody to register the voters and people who were not even members of the party could vote multiple times at different voting posts, there was little criticism of the primary election arrangements after Ahtisaari had won. However, it is also likely that he would have won regardless of the way that the primaries were held. Ahtisaari was supported by a small but significant group of Finnish politicians who had long been hostile to Sorsa: Erkki Tuomioja, Lasse Lehtinen and Matti Ahde.

=== Later years ===
Sorsa continued to participate in discussions of social policy until the end of his life, his last column being published posthumously.

He died of cancer on 16 January 2004 at his home in Helsinki at the age of 73. He was survived by his wife; the couple had no children.

The Kalevi Sorsa Foundation is a social democratic think tank, established in 2005 and named in his honour.

== As head of government and foreign ministry ==
- Minister of Foreign Affairs (Finland), 1972
- Sorsa I Cabinet, 1972–1975
- Minister of Foreign Affairs (Finland), 1975–1976
- Sorsa II Cabinet, 1977–1979
- Sorsa III Cabinet, 1982–1983
- Sorsa IV Cabinet, 1983–1987
- Minister of Foreign Affairs (Finland), 1987–1989

== Honours ==
- Commander Grand Cross in the Order of the White Rose of Finland
- Knight Grand Cross in the Order of Orange-Nassau, Netherlands
- Grand Cross in the Order of the Falcon, Iceland
- Knight Grand Cross in the Order of the North Star, Sweden
- Grand Cross in the Order of Merit of the Republic of Poland
- Knight Grand Cross in the Order of the Dannebrog, Denmark
- Grand Cross in the National Order of Merit, France
- Knight Grand Cross in the Order of Isabella the Catholic, Spain
- Grand Cross in the Order of the Southern Cross, Brazil

== See also ==
- Politics of Finland
- Socialist International
- Minister of Foreign Affairs (Finland)
- Martti Ahtisaari

Political offices
| Preceded by Rafael Paasio | Prime Minister of Finland; 1972–1975 | Succeeded by Keijo Liinamaa |
| Preceded by Martti Miettunen | Prime Minister of Finland; 1977–1979 | Succeeded by Mauno Koivisto |
| Preceded by Mauno Koivisto | Prime Minister of Finland; 1982–1987 | Succeeded by Harri Holkeri |
| Preceded by Matti Ahde | Speaker of the Parliament of Finland; 1989–1991 | Succeeded by Esko Aho |
