= List of cabinet ministers in Finland who have resigned from their office =

This is a list of cabinet ministers in Finland who have resigned from their office. There are no Cabinet reshuffles or fall of cabinets in the list.

== List ==
Year of resignation	Post	Minister	Cabinet	Party affiliation	Reason	Successor	Party affiliation
1918	Ministry of Agriculture and Forestry	Kyösti Kallio	Paasikivi I	Agrarian League	resigned because of the government's royalist policy	Uuno Brander	National Progressive Party
1918	Deputy Minister of Agriculture	E. Y. Pehkonen	Paasikivi I	Agrarian League	resigned because of the government's royalist policy	Successor was not appointed	
1923	Minister of Defence	Bruno Jalander	Kallio I	Non-partisan	spying scandal	Vilho Nenonen	Non-partisan
1933	Minister of Justice	Hugo Malmberg	Kivimäki	Swedish People's Party	was appointed president of Vaasa Court of Appeal	Eric J. Serlachius	Swedish People's Party
1936	Minister of Justice	Eric J. Serlachius	Kivimäki	Swedish People's Party	Swedish People's Party left the government because of the controversial language of the University of Helsinki	Emil Jatkola	Edistyspuolue
1936	Deputy Minister of Finance	Rolf Witting	Kivimäki	Swedish People's Party	Swedish People's Party left the government because of the controversial language of the University of Helsinki	Tyko Reinikka	Agrarian League
1938	Minister for Foreign Affairs	Rudolf Holsti	Cajander III	National Progressive Party	Citicized Adolf Hitler at the League of Nations Assembly of the Foreign Ministers' Meeting	Väinö Voionmaa	Social Democratic Party
1939	Deputy Minister of Agriculture	Oskari Reinikainen	Cajander III	Social Democratic Party	Was appointed as Director of the Medical Board chief executive officer.	Successor was not appointed	
1941	Minister of the Interior	Ernst von Born	Rangell	Swedish People's Party	objected to the Karelian refugees resettlement in the Swedish-speaking regions	Toivo Horelli	National Coalition Party
1941	Minister of People's Service	Väinö Kotilainen	Rangell	Non-partisan	Was appointed as East Karelia military administration commander	Väinö Arola	Agrarian League
1943	Minister of Social Affairs	Karl-August Fagerholm	Linkomies	Social Democratic Party	Citicized German occupation in Norway	Aleksi Aaltonen	Social Democratic Party
1945	Deputy Minister of Social Affairs	Pekka Heikkinen	Ryti II	Agrarian League	Was appointed as Governor of the Kuopio Province	Viljami Kalliokoski	Agrarian League
1945	Deputy Minister of Social Affairs	Eero A. Wuori	Paasikivi III	Social Democratic Party	Was appointed as Finnish Ambassador to the United Kingdom	Eino Kilpi	Social Democratic Party
1945	Minister of Finance	Sakari Tuomioja	Kekkonen III	National Progressive Party	Was appointed as Governor of Bank of Finland	Ralf Törngren	Swedish People's Party
1948	Minister of the Interior	Yrjö Leino	Pekkala	People's Democratic League	a motion of censure of Parliament	Eino Kilpi	People's Democratic League
1948	Deputy Minister of Foreign Affairs	Reinhold Svento	Pekkala	People's Democratic League	Was appointed as Finnish Ambassador to Switzerland	Aarre Simonen	Social Democratic Party
1949	Deputy Minister of Transport and Public Works	Erkki Härmä	Fagerholm I	Social Democratic Party	Was appointed as Governor of the Turku and Pori Province	Uuno Takki	Social Democratic Party
1949	Minister of Social Affairs	Valdemar Liljeström	Fagerholm I	Social Democratic Party	personal reasons; traveled on the train under heave influence of alcohol beveriges	Tyyne Leivo-Larsson	Social Democratic Party
1950	Deputy Minister of Interior	Lauri Riikonen	Kekkonen I	Agrarian League	Was appointed as Governor of the Kuopio Province	Johannes Virolainen	Agrarian League
1953	Deputy Minister of Agriculture	Matti Lepistö	Kekkonen III	Social Democratic Party	because of political scandal	Taavi Vilhula	Agrarian League
1953	Minister of Transport and Public Works	Onni Peltonen	Kekkonen III	Social Democratic Party	because of political scandal	Eemil Huunonen	Social Democratic Party
1957	Minister of Finance	Nils Meinander	Sukselainen I	Swedish People's Party	Swedish People's Party left the government because of the state financial crisis	Esa Kaitila	People's Party
1957	Deputy of Minister of Agriculture	Bertel Lindh	Sukselainen I	Swedish People's Party	Swedish People's Party left the government because of the state financial crisis	Matti Lepistö	Sos. Dem. Opposition
1957	Deputy Minister of Transport and Public Works	Torsten Nordström	Sukselainen I	Swedish People's Party	Swedish People's Party left the government because of the state financial crisis	Kustaa Tiitu	Agrarian League
1958	Ministry of Agriculture and Forestry	Martti Miettunen	Fagerholm III	Agrarian League	Was appointed as Governor of the Lapland Province	Urho Kähönen	Agrarian League
1958	Minister for Foreign Affairs	Johannes Virolainen	Fagerholm III	Agrarian League	International crises between Soviet Union and Finland	Karl-August Fagerholm	Social Democratic Party
1960	Minister of the Interior	Eino Palovesi	Sukselainen I	Agrarian League	Was appointed as Governor of the Central Finland Province	Eemil Luukka	Agrarian League
1961	Minister of Justice	Antti Hannikainen	Sukselainen II	Agrarian League	was appointed Chancellor of Justice	Pauli Lehtosalo	Agrarian League
1963	Minister of the Interior	Eeli Erkkilä	Karjalainen I	Agrarian League	health reasons	Niilo Ryhtä	Agrarian League
1963	Deputy Minister of Finance	Onni Koski	Karjalainen I	Social Democratic Union of Workers and Smallholders (SAK)	Social Democratic Union of Workers and Smallholders left cabinet because of the government's budget dispute	Johan Otto Söderhjelm	Swedish People's Party
1963	Minister of Transport and Public Works	Onni Närvänen	Karjalainen I	Social Democratic Union of Workers and Smallholders (SAK)	Social Democratic Union of Workers and Smallholders left cabinet because of the government's budget dispute	Olavi Lahtela	Agrarian League
1963	Minister of Social Affairs	Olavi Saarinen	Karjalainen I	Social Democratic Union of Workers and Smallholders (SAK)	Social Democratic Union of Workers and Smallholders left cabinet because of the government's budget dispute	Kyllikki Pohjala	National Coalition Party
1963	Minister of Finance	Osmo P. Karttunen	Karjalainen I	National Coalition Party	credibility issue	Mauno Jussila	Agrarian League
1964	Minister at Council of State	Aarne Nuorvala	Lehto	Non-partisan	was appointed Chancellor of Justice	Successor was not appointed	
1967	Minister of the Interior	Niilo Ryhtä	Paasio I	Agrarian League	Was appointed as Governor of the Oulu province	Martti Viitanen	Social Democratic Party
1967	Deputy Minister of Social Affairs	Esa Timonen	Paasio I	Agrarian League	Was appointed as Governor of the North Karelia Province	Toivo Saloranta	Agrarian League
1967	Minister of the Interior	Martti Viitanen	Miettunen II	Social Democratic Party	Was appointed as Governor of the Vaasa Province	Antero Väyrynen	Social Democratic Party
1969	Deputy Minister of Transport and Public Works	Viljo Virtanen	Koivisto I	Social Democratic Party	Was appointed as Governor of the Mikkeli Province	Veikko Helle	Social Democratic Party
1970	Minister of the Interior	Artturi Jämsén	Karjalainen II	Centre Party	Was appointed as Governor of the Central Finland Province	Eino Uusitalo	Centre Party
1971	Minister of Justice	Erkki Tuominen	Karjalainen II	People's Democratic League	People's Democratic League left cabinet because of the government's budget dispute	Mikko Laaksonen	Social Democratic Party
1971	Minister of Transport	Veikko Saarto	Karjalainen II	People's Democratic League	People's Democratic League left cabinet because of the government's budget dispute	Kalervo Haapasalo	Social Democratic Party
1971	Minister of Social Affairs	Anna-Liisa Tiekso	Karjalainen II	People's Democratic League	People's Democratic League left cabinet because of the government's budget dispute	Pekka Kuusi	Social Democratic Party
1972	Ministry of Trade and Industry	Grels Teir	Sorsa I	Swedish People's Party	Was appointed as the chief executive officer of the State Treasury	Jan-Magnus Jansson	Swedish People's Party
1973	Ministry of Agriculture and Forestry	Erkki Haukipuro	Sorsa I	Centre Party	Was appointed as Governor of the Oulu Province	Heimo Linna	Centre Party
1973	Ministry of Trade and Industry	Jussi Linnamo	Sorsa I	Social Democratic Party	Zavidovo-scandal	Grels Teir	Swedish People's Party
1973	Deputy Minister of Finance	Margit Eskman	Paasio II	Social Democratic Party	Was appointed as the chief executive officer of the Social Insurance Institution	Seija Karkinen	Social Democratic Party
1974	Ministry of Trade and Industry	Jan-Magnus Jansson	Sorsa I	Swedish People's Party	Was appointed as the editorial chief of Hufvudstadsbladet	Kristian Gestrin	Swedish People's Party
1976	Deputy Minister of Finance	Viljo Luukka	Miettunen II	Non-partisan	health reasons	Esko Rekola	Non-partisan
1978	Deputy Minister	Kristian Gestrin	Sorsa II	Swedish People's Party	Swedish People's Party left the government, as opposed to economic power bill	Tuure Salo	Liberal People's Party
1978	Minister of Education	Kristian Gestrin	Sorsa II	Swedish People's Party	Swedish People's Party left the government, as opposed to economic power bill	Jaakko Itälä	Liberal People's Party
1981	Ministry of Trade and Industry	Ulf Sundqvist	Koivisto II	Social Democratic Party	Was appointed as the CEO of the National Workers' Savings Bank	Pirkko Työläjärvi	Social Democratic Party
1982	Minister of Health and Social Services	Jacob Söderman	Sorsa III	Social Democratic Party	Was appointed as Governor of the Uusimaa Province	Eeva Kuuskoski	Centre Party
1982	Minister of Education	Kalevi Kivistö	Sorsa III	People's Democratic League	People's Democratic League left cabinet because of the government's budget dispute	Kaarina Suonio	Social Democratic Party
1982	Minister of Transport	Jarmo Wahlström	Sorsa III	People's Democratic League	People's Democratic League left cabinet because of the government's budget dispute	Reino Breilin	Social Democratic Party
1982	Minister of Labour	Jouko Kajanoja	Sorsa III	People's Democratic League	People's Democratic League left cabinet because of the government's budget dispute	Veikko Helle	Social Democratic Party
1982	Deputy Minister of Finance	Mauno Forsman	Sorsa III	Social Democratic Party	Was appointed as the CEO of the Finland's Slot Machine Association	Jermu Laine	Social Democratic Party
1982	Minister of Foreign Trade	Esko Rekola	Sorsa III	Non-partisan	retired	Arne Berner	Liberal People's Party
1984	Minister of Health and Social Services	Vappu Taipale	Sorsa IV	Social Democratic Party	Was appointed as the Director of the National Board of Social Institute	Matti Puhakka	Social Democratic Party
1986	Minister of Education	Kaarina Suonio	Sorsa IV	Social Democratic Party	Was appointed as Deputy Mayor of City of Tampere	Pirjo Ala-Kapee	Social Democratic Party
1986	Minister of Finance	Ahti Pekkala	Sorsa IV	Centre Party	Was appointed as Governor of the Oulu province	Esko Ollila	Centre Party
1989	Minister of Transport	Pekka Vennamo	Holkeri	Finnish Rural Party	Was appointed as the Director of the Post and Telecommunications Authority	Raimo Vistbacka	Finnish Rural Party
1989	Minister of Health and Social Services	Helena Pesola	Holkeri	National Coalition Party	Was appointed as the Director of the National Board of Social Institute	Mauri Miettinen	National Coalition Party
1990	Minister of Finance	Erkki Liikanen	Holkeri	Social Democratic Party	Was appointed as the Ambassador to the European Community	Matti Louekoski	Social Democratic Party
1990	Minister of Education	Christoffer Taxell	Holkeri	Swedish People's Party	Was appointed as the CEO of Partek	Ole Norrback	Swedish People's Party
1990	Minister of the Environment	Kaj Bärlund	Holkeri	Social Democratic Party	Was appointed as the Director of the Water and Environment Board	Successor was not appointed	
1990	Minister of Transport	Raimo Vistbacka	Holkeri	Finnish Rural Party	Rural Party left cabinet because of the government's budget dispute	Ilkka Kanerva	National Coalition Party
1992	Minister of Health and Social Services	Eeva Kuuskoski	Aho	Centre Party	resigned because of budget dispute	Jorma Huuhtanen	Centre Party
1992	Ministry of Trade and Industry	Kauko Juhantalo	Aho	Centre Party	Impeachment	Pekka Tuomisto	Centre Party
1993	Minister for Foreign Affairs	Paavo Väyrynen	Aho	Centre Party	resigned; started the 1994 presidential campaign.	Heikki Haavisto	Centre Party
1993	Ministry of Trade and Industry	Pekka Tuomisto	Aho	Centre Party	Was appointed as the Director of the National Board of Social Institute	Seppo Kääriäinen	Centre Party
1994	Minister for International Development	Toimi Kankaanniemi	Aho	Christian Democrats	Christian Democrats left cabinet because of the government's EC membership vote	Successor was not appointed	
1994	Minister of Justice	Hannele Pokka	Aho	Centre Party	Was appointed as Governor of the Lapland Province	Anneli Jäätteenmäki	Centre Party
1994	Minister of Agriculture and Forestry	Martti Pura	Aho	Centre Party	was appointed as Mayor of Sodankylä	Mikko Pesälä	Centre Party
1995	Minister for Foreign Affairs	Heikki Haavisto	Aho	Centre Party	Fell ill with a brain hemorrhage	Paavo Rantanen	Non-partisan
1995	Minister of Housing	Pirjo Rusanen	Aho	National Coalition Party	Became as MEP of the European Parliament	Anneli Taina	National Coalition Party
1995	Minister of Defence	Elisabeth Rehn	Aho	Swedish People's Party	Became as MEP of the European Parliament	Jan-Erik Enestam	Swedish People's Party
1996	Minister of Finance	Iiro Viinanen	Lipponen I	National Coalition Party	Was appointed as the CEO of Pohjola Bank	Sauli Niinistö	National Coalition Party
1997	Minister of Transport	Tuula Linnainmaa	Lipponen I	National Coalition Party	Was appointed as Governor of the Uusimaa Province	Matti Aura	National Coalition Party
1997	Deputy Minister of Finance	Arja Alho	Lipponen I	Social Democratic Party	resigned as accused of financial fraud	Jouko Skinnari	Social Democratic Party
1998	Minister of Justice	Kari Häkämies	Lipponen I	National Coalition Party	was appointed as Mayor of City of Kuopio	Jussi Järventaus	National Coalition Party
1998	Minister of Culture	Claes Andersson	Lipponen I	Left Alliance	gave up the chairmanship of the Left Alliance	Suvi-Anne Siimes	Vasemmistoliitto
1999	Minister of Transport	Matti Aura	Lipponen I	National Coalition Party	Allegations of abuse of power.	Kimmo Sasi	National Coalition Party
2002	Minister of the Environment	Satu Hassi	Lipponen II	Greens	The Greens left the government because of the nuclear plant decision plan	Jouni Backman	Social Democratic Party
2002	Minister of Social Services	Osmo Soininvaara	Lipponen II	Greens	The Greens left the government because of the nuclear plant decision plan	Eva Biaudet	Swedish People's Party
2002	Minister of Culture	Suvi Linden	Lipponen II	National Coalition Party	Allegations of abuse of power.	Kaarina Dromberg	National Coalition Party
2002	Minister of Agriculture and Forestry	Kalevi Hemilä	Lipponen II	Non-partisan	Was appointed as the CEO of the Food Industry Association	Raimo Tammilehto	Non-partisan
2002	Minister of Transport	Olli-Pekka Heinonen	Lipponen II	National Coalition Party	Was appointed as the CEO of the Finnish Broadcasting Company	Kimmo Sasi	National Coalition Party
2003	Prime Minister	Anneli Jäätteenmäki	Jäätteenmäki	Centre Party	Iraq-gate scandal	Matti Vanhanen	Centre Party
2008	Minister of Education	Sari Sarkomaa	Vanhanen II	National Coalition Party	personal reasons	Henna Virkkunen	National Coalition Party
2008	Minister for Foreign Affairs	Ilkka Kanerva	Vanhanen II	National Coalition Party	sexual scandal	Alexander Stubb	National Coalition Party
2009	Minister of Labour	Tarja Cronberg	Vanhanen II	Greens	gave up the chairmanship of the Greens	Anni Sinnemäki	Greens
2010	Minister of Health and Social Services	Sinikka Mönkäre	Vanhanen II	Social Democratic Party	Was appointed as the CEO of the Finland's Slot Machine Association	Tuula Haatainen	Social Democratic Party
2010	Prime Minister	Matti Vanhanen	Vanhanen II	Centre Party	Was appointed as the CEO of the Association of the Family Businesses	Mari Kiviniemi	Centre Party
2010	Minister of Health and Social Services	Liisa Hyssälä	Vanhanen II	Centre Party	Was appointed as the Director of the National Board of Social Institute	Juha Rehula	Centre Party
2012	Ministry of Economic Affairs	Jyri Häkämies	Katainen	National Coalition Party	Was appointed as the CEO of Confederation of Finnish Industries	Jan Vapaavuori	National Coalition Party
2012	Minister of Defence	Stefan Wallin	Katainen	Swedish People's Party	Swedish People's Party gave up the chairmanship of the Minister and in the same place	Carl Haglund	Swedish People's Party
2013	Minister for International Development	Heidi Hautala	Katainen	Greens	Allegations of abuse of power.	Pekka Haavisto	Greens
2014	Minister of Transport	Merja Kyllönen	Katainen	Left Alliance	Left Alliance left cabinet because of the government's budget dispute	Henna Virkkunen	National Coalition Party
2014	Minister of Culture and Sports	Paavo Arhinmäki	Katainen	Left Alliance	Left Alliance left cabinet because of the government's budget dispute	Pia Viitanen	Social Democratic Party
2014	Prime Minister	Jyrki Katainen	Katainen	National Coalition Party	Was appointed as the European Commissioner	Alexander Stubb	National Coalition Party
2014	Minister of Finance	Jutta Urpilainen	Katainen	Social Democratic Party	lost of party leadership	Antti Rinne	Social Democratic Party
2014	Transport and Local Government	Henna Virkkunen	Katainen	National Coalition Party	Became as MEP of the European Parliament	Paula Risikko	National Coalition Party
2014	Minister for International Development	Pekka Haavisto	Stubb	Greens	The Greens left the government because of the nuclear plant decision plan	Sirpa Paatero	Social Democratic Party
2014	Minister of the Environment	Ville Niinistö	Stubb	Greens	The Greens left the government because of the nuclear plant decision plan	Sanni Grahn-Laasonen	National Coalition Party
2016	Minister of Finance	Alexander Stubb	Sipilä	National Coalition Party	lost chairmanship of the National Coalition Party	Petteri Orpo	National Coalition Party
2016	Minister of Health and Social Services	Hanna Mäntylä	Sipilä	True Finns	resigned for family reasons	Pirkko Mattila	True Finns
2016	Ministry of Economic Affairs	Olli Rehn	Sipilä	Centre Party	Was appointed as the member of the Executive Board of the Bank of Finland	Mika Lintilä	Centre Party
2019	Minister of Local Government and Ownership Steering	Sirpa Paatero	Rinne	Social Democratic Party	Finland postal strike controversy 2019	Tytti Tuppurainen (European Affairs and Ownership Steering), Sirpa Paatero (Local Government)	Social Democratic Party
2019	Prime Minister	Antti Rinne	Rinne	Social Democratic Party	lack of confidence	Sanna Marin	Social Democratic Party
2020	Minister of Finance	Katri Kulmuni	Marin	Centre Party	coaching paid for with taxpayers' money	Matti Vanhanen	Centre Party
2023	Minister of Economic Affairs	Vilhelm Junnila	Orpo	Finns Party	far-right links	Wille Rydman	Finns Party
