= Pekkala cabinet =

Pekkala Cabinet
- 31st Cabinet of Finland
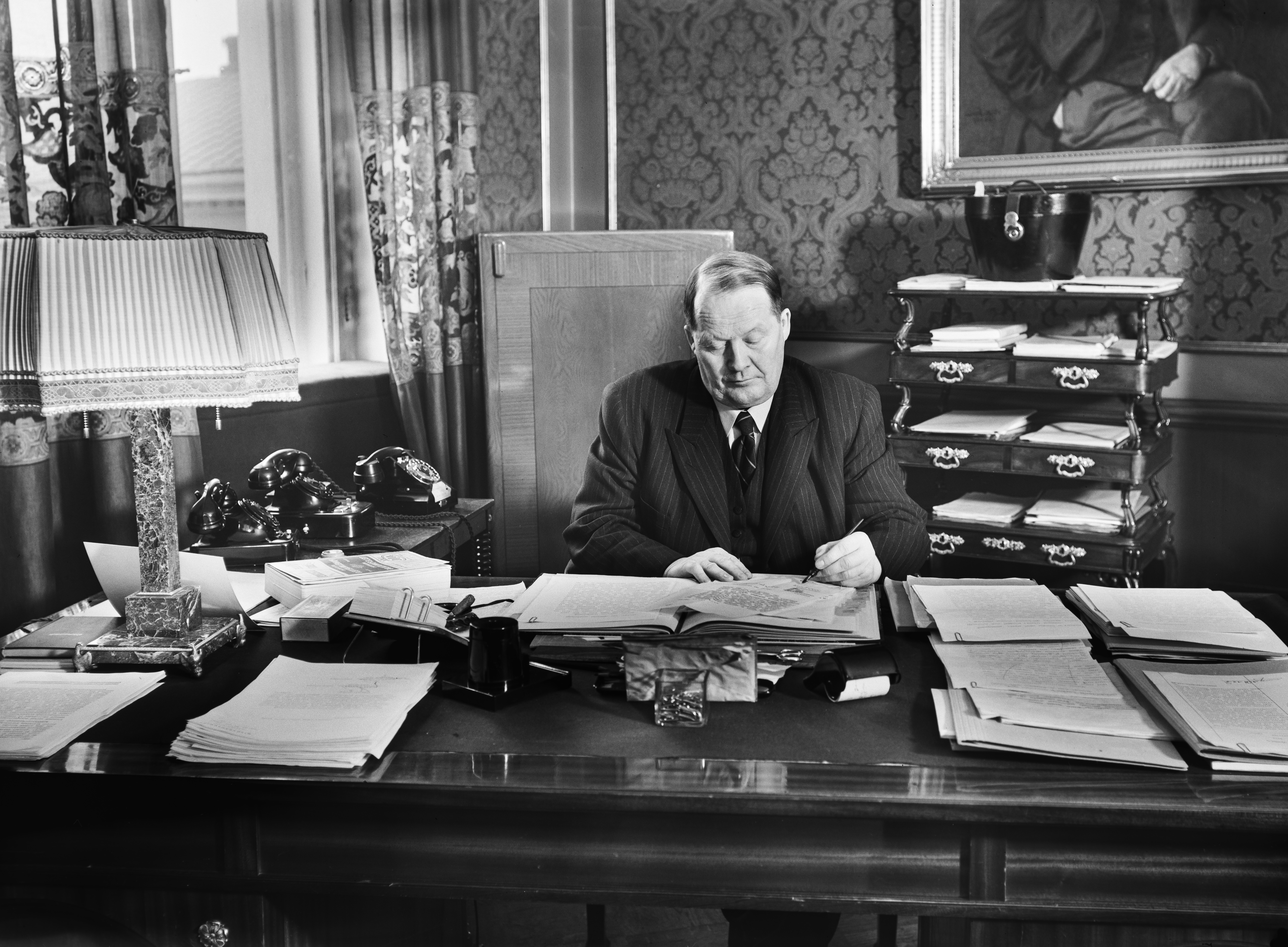
- Photo of Mauno Pekkala serving as Prime Minister in 1946.
- Date formed: 26 March 1946
- Date dissolved: 29 July 1948

People and organisations
- President: Juho Kusti Paasikivi
- Prime Minister: Mauno Pekkala
- Total no. of members: 22
- Member parties: People's Democratic League (SKDP); Social Democratic Party; Agrarian League; Swedish People's Party (RKP)
- Status in legislature: Majority government 162 / 200 (81%)
- Opposition parties: National Coalition; National Progressive; Small Farmers Party; Swedish Left

History
- Predecessor: Paasikivi III
- Successor: Fagerholm I

Mauno Pekkala's cabinet (Note: Finnish: Pekkalan hallitus; Swedish: Regeringen Pekkala) was the 31st government of the Republic of Finland. The cabinet's time period was from March 26, 1946, to July 29, 1948. It was a majority government. Pekkala's cabinet did many major reforms including the child benefit security.

== Ministers ==
Portfolio	Minister	Took office	Left office	Party
Prime Minister	Mauno Pekkala	March 26, 1946	July 29, 1948	People's Democratic League
Deputy Prime Minister	Yrjö Kallinen	March 26, 1946	April 6, 1948	Social Democratic
Deputy Prime Minister	Hertta Kuusinen	April 6, 1948	July 29, 1948	People's Democratic League
Minister of Foreign Affairs	Carl Enckell	March 26, 1946	July 29, 1948	Independent
Minister at the Ministry of Foreign Affairs	Reinhold Svento	March 26, 1946	April 30, 1948	People's Democratic League
Minister at the Ministry of Foreign Affairs	Uuno Takki	March 27, 1946	July 29, 1948	Social Democratic
Minister of the Interior	Yrjö Leino	March 26, 1946	May 22, 1948	People's Democratic League
Minister of the Interior	Eino Kilpi	May 26, 1948	July 29, 1948	People's Democratic League
Minister at the Ministry of Interior	Paavo A. Viding	March 26, 1946	July 29, 1948	Agrarian
Minister of Defence	Mauno Pekkala	March 26, 1946	March 27, 1946	People's Democratic League
Minister of Defence	Yrjö Kallinen	March 27, 1946	July 29, 1948	Social Democratic
Minister at the Ministry of Defence	Mauno Pekkala	March 26, 1946	July 29, 1948	People's Democratic League
Minister of Finance	Ralf Törngren	March 26, 1946	July 29, 1948	Swedish People's
Minister at the Ministry of Finance	Onni Hiltunen	March 26, 1946	July 29, 1948	Social Democratic
Minister of Education	Eino Kilpi	March 26, 1946	May 26, 1948	People's Democratic League
Minister of Education	Lennart Heljas	May 26, 1948	July 29, 1948	Agrarian
Minister of Agriculture	Vihtori Vesterinen	March 26, 1946	July 29, 1948	Agrarian
Minister at the Ministry of Agriculture	Paavo A. Viding	March 26, 1946	July 29, 1948	Agrarian
Minister of Transport and Public Works	Lauri Kaijalainen	March 26, 1946	July 29, 1948	Agrarian
Minister at the Ministry of Transport and Public Works	Erkki Härmä	March 26, 1946	July 29, 1948	Social Democratic
Minister of Trade and Industry	Uuno Takki	March 26, 1946	July 29, 1948	Social Democratic
Minister of Social Affairs	Matti Janhunen	March 26, 1946	July 29, 1948	People's Democratic League
Minister at the Ministry of Social Affairs	Lennart Heljas	March 26, 1946	May 26, 1948	Agrarian
Minister at the Ministry of Social Affairs	Erkki Härmä	April 12, 1946	July 29, 1948	Social Democratic
Minister at the Ministry of Social Affairs	Onni Peltonen	May 26, 1948	July 29, 1948	Social Democratic
Minister of Public Welfare	Taavi Vilhula	March 26, 1946	July 29, 1948	Agrarian
Minister at the Ministry of Public Welfare	Yrjö Murto	March 26, 1946	July 29, 1948	People's Democratic League
Minister at the Ministry of Public Welfare	Erkki Härmä	April 12, 1946	July 29, 1948	Social Democratic
Minister without portfolio	Hertta Kuusinen	May 26, 1948	June 4, 1948	People's Democratic League

Preceded by Paasakivi III	Cabinet of Finland; March 26, 1946 – July 29, 1948	Succeeded by Fagerholm I
