= Olavi J. Mattila =

Finnish politician (1918–2013)

Ministeri (Minister) Olavi J. Mattila
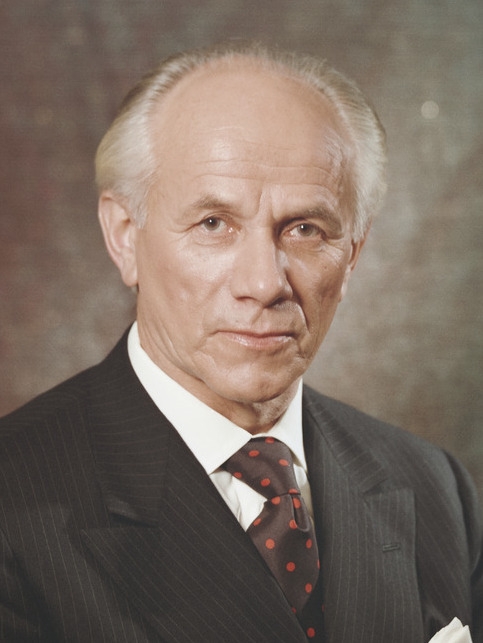
- Mattila in 1975

Minister of Foreign Affairs
- In office 13 June 1975 – 30 November 1975
- Prime Minister: Keijo Liinamaa
- Preceded by: Ahti Karjalainen
- Succeeded by: Kalevi Sorsa
- In office 29 October 1971 – 23 February 1972
- Prime Minister: Teuvo Aura
- Preceded by: Väinö Leskinen
- Succeeded by: Kalevi Sorsa

Minister of Trade and Industry
- In office 14 May 1970 – 15 July 1970
- Prime Minister: Teuvo Aura
- Preceded by: Grels Teir
- Succeeded by: Arne Berner
- In office 18 December 1963 – 12 September 1964
- Prime Minister: Reino R. Lehto
- Preceded by: Toivo Wiherheimo
- Succeeded by: Toivo Wiherheimo

Deputy Prime Minister of Finland
- In office 13 June 1975 – 30 November 1975
- Prime Minister: Keijo Liinamaa
- Preceded by: Ahti Karjalainen
- Succeeded by: Kalevi Sorsa

Personal details
- Born: Olavi Johannes Mattila; 24 October 1918 Hyvinkää, Finland
- Died: 4 August 2013 (aged 94) Hyvinkää, Finland
- Party: Independent
- Spouse(s): Annikki (deceased, June 2004)
- Children: Olli Mattila

Olavi Johannes Mattila (24 October 1918 – 4 August 2013) was a Finnish politician who served twice as the Finnish Minister for Foreign Affairs, and also held several other ministerial positions in a number of cabinets in the 1960s and 1970s. He was also the CEO of state owned Valmet. He was considered as a close associate of Urho Kekkonen.

He graduated as master of science in engineering in 1946 and as MBA in 1950. Mattila worked in the diplomatic missions in Beijing, China and Buenos Aires, Argentina from 1952 to 1960. Later he became a director in the ministry of trade and industry. For two short terms in 1960s and 1970s he hold the position of Minister of Trade and Industry as a non-partisan. He worked in the state-owned Valmet, first as the CEO from 1965 to 1973 and as the chairman of the board from 1973 to 1982. He was also the chairman of the board of Enso-Gutzeit, another state-owned company.

His son, Olli Mattila, who also worked as a diplomat in the foreign ministry, was convicted in the early 2000s for espionage.

In 2002, he was visited by members of Jehovah's Witnesses studying the Bible with them, and he subsequently joined the religion. He died 4 August 2013 at the age of 94.

Political offices
Preceded by Väinö Leskinen	Foreign Minister of Finland; 1971-1972	Succeeded by Kalevi Sorsa
Preceded by Ahti Karjalainen	Foreign Minister of Finland; 1975	Succeeded by Kalevi Sorsa
