= Toivo Wiherheimo =

Finnish economist and politician

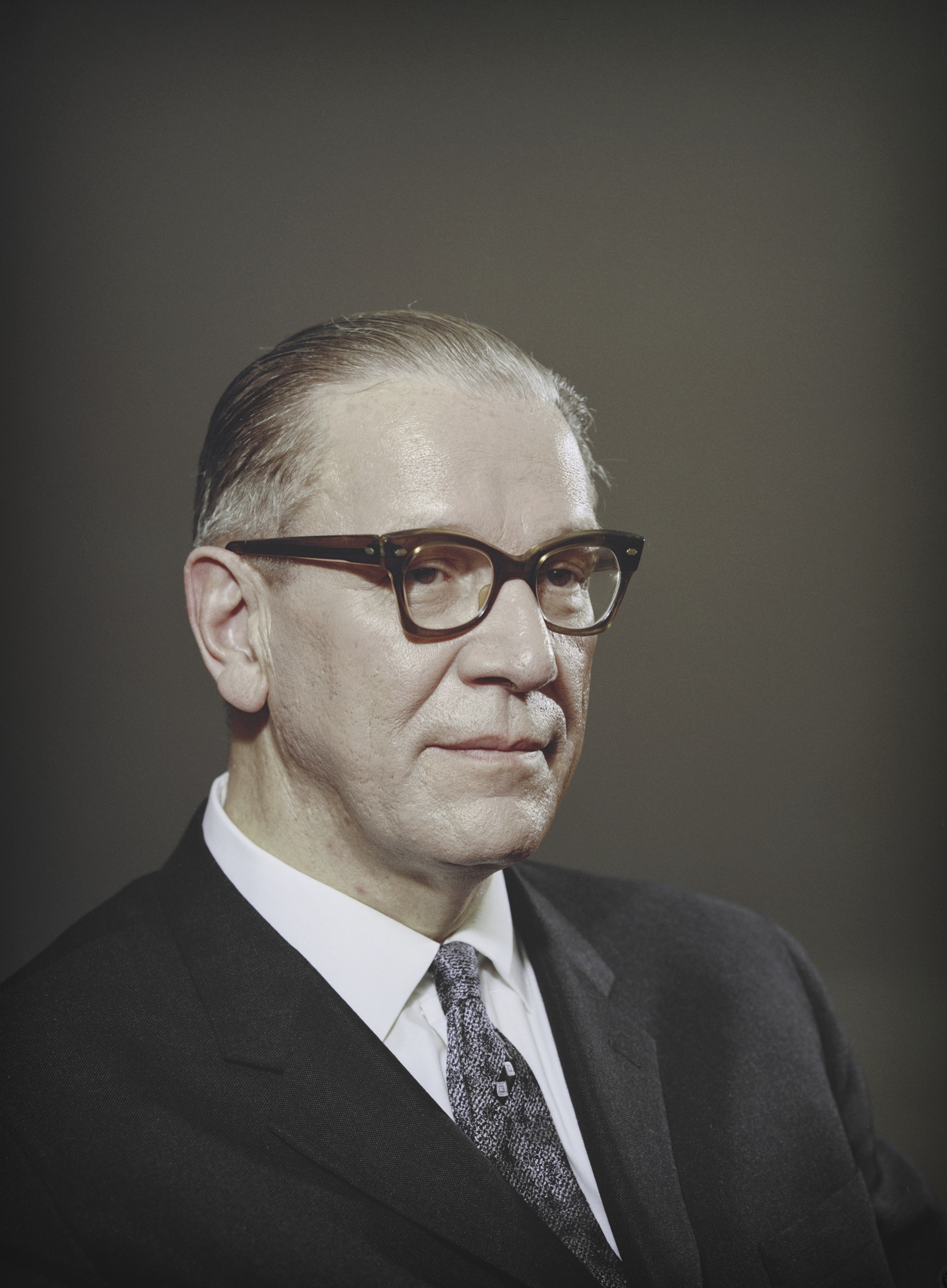
- Wiherheimo in 1966.

Minister of Trade an Industry
- In office 12 September 1964 – 27 May 1966
- Prime Minister: Johannes Virolainen
- Preceded by: Olavi J. Mattila
- Succeeded by: Olavi Salonen
- In office 13 April 1962 – 18 December 1963
- Prime Minister: Ahti Karjalainen
- Preceded by: Ilmari Hustich
- Succeeded by: Olavi J. Mattila

Minister of Defence
- In office 29 August 1958 – 13 January 1959
- Prime Minister: Karl-August Fagerholm
- Preceded by: Edvard Björkenheim
- Succeeded by: Leo Häppölä

Member of the Finnish Parliament
- In office 22 July 1948 – 4 April 1966
- Constituency: Pirkanmaa

Personal details
- Born: Toivo Antero Wiherheimo; 13 July 1898 Helsinki, Finland
- Died: 5 March 1970 (aged 71) Helsinki, Finland
- Party: National Coalition

Toivo Antero Wiherheimo (13 July 1898 in Helsinki – 5 March 1970 in Helsinki; surname until 1906 Grönhag) was a Finnish economist and politician. He served as Deputy Minister of Trade and Industry from 17 November 1953 to 4 May 1954 and again from 29 August 1958 to 13 January 1959, Minister of Defence from 29 August 1958 to 13 January 1959 and Minister of Trade and Industry from 13 April 1962 to 17 December 1963 and again from 12 September 1964 to 27 May 1966.

He was a member of the Parliament of Finland from 1948 to 1966, representing the National Coalition Party.
