= Väinö Tanner =

Prime minister of Finland from 1926 to 1927

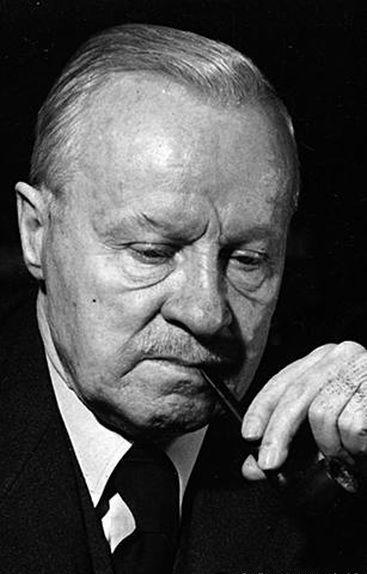

10th Prime Minister of Finland
- In office 13 December 1926 – 17 December 1927
- President: Lauri K. Relander
- Preceded by: Kyösti Kallio
- Succeeded by: Juho Sunila

Minister of Foreign Affairs
- In office 1 December 1939 – 27 March 1940
- Prime Minister: Risto Ryti
- Preceded by: Eljas Erkko
- Succeeded by: Rolf Witting

Minister of Finance
- In office 22 May 1942 – 8 August 1944
- Prime Minister: Johan W. Rangell; Edwin Linkomies
- Preceded by: Mauno Pekkala
- Succeeded by: Onni Hiltunen
- In office 12 March 1937 – 1 December 1939
- Prime Minister: Aimo Cajander
- Preceded by: Juho Niukkanen
- Succeeded by: Mauno Pekkala

Minister of Trade and Industry
- In office 3 July 1941 – 22 May 1942
- Prime Minister: Johan W. Rangell
- Preceded by: Toivo Salmino
- Succeeded by: Uuno Takki

Personal details
- Born: 12 March 1881 Helsinki, Grand Duchy of Finland, Russian Empire
- Died: 19 April 1966 (aged 85) Helsinki, Finland
- Resting place: Hietaniemi Cemetery
- Party: Social Democratic
- Spouse: Linda Anttila
- Children: 8

Väinö Alfred Tanner (Finnish pronunciation: [ˈʋæi̯nø ˈalfred ˈtɑnːer]; 12 March 1881 – 19 April 1966; surname until 1895 Thomasson) was a leading figure in the Social Democratic Party of Finland, and a pioneer and leader of the cooperative movement in Finland. He was Prime Minister of Finland in 1926–1927.

== Biography ==
Tanner was born in Helsinki as the son of a railway brakesman of modest means. After matriculating from Ressu Upper Secondary School in 1900, he studied at the business college Suomen Liikemiesten Kauppaopisto (one of two predecessors of the present-day Business College Helsinki). He also studied law, graduating as a jurist in 1911.

Tanner started work as a trainee at the Großeinkaufs-Gesellschaft Deutscher Consumvereine (GEG) in Hamburg, Germany, while still a student, and in 1903, after returning to Finland, became manager of Turun Vähäväkisten Osuusliike, then the largest cooperative retail society in Finland. He was later appointed to the supervisory board of the Helsinki-based cooperative Elanto in 1907, and also became chairman of Suomen Osuuskauppojen Keskuskunta (SOK) in 1909 and CEO of Elanto in 1915. He also served as president of the International Co-operative Alliance (ICA) from 1927 until 1945.

He did not participate in the Finnish Civil War, maintaining a neutral attitude. When the war ended he became Finland's leading Social Democratic Party (SDP) politician, and a strong proponent of the parliamentary system. His main achievement was the rehabilitation of the SDP after the Civil War. Väinö Tanner served as Prime Minister (1926–1927), Minister of Finance (1937–1939), Minister of Foreign Affairs (1939–1940), and after the Winter War Minister of Trade and Industry (1941–1942) and Minister of Finance (1942–1944).

Väinö Tanner's legacy is in his directing the Finnish working class from their extremist ideology towards pragmatic progress through the democratic process. Under his leadership the Social Democrats were trusted to form a minority government already less than 10 years after the bloody civil war. Tanner's minority socialist government passed a series of important social reforms during its time in office, which included a liberal amnesty law, reduced duties on imported foods, and pension and health insurance laws.

During President Relander's brief illness Tanner, who held the post of prime minister, was even the acting president and Commander-In-Chief. In this role he even received the parade of the White guards on the 10th anniversary of the White victory. This was perceived as a remarkable development at the time. During the 1930s and 1940s, the Social Democrats formed several coalition governments with the Agrarian party. In the Winter War Väinö Tanner was the foreign minister. Väinö Tanner's leadership was very important in forming the grounds and creating the Spirit of the Winter War which united the nation.

After the end of the Continuation War, Tanner was tried for responsibility for the war in February 1946, and sentenced to five years and six months in prison.

After the Continuation War, and while still in prison, Tanner became the virtual leader of a faction of the SDP which had strong support from the US. This faction eventually came out on top after a great deal of internal party strife lasting for much of the 1940s. Tanner criticised Finland's post-war doctrine known as Paasikivi-Kekkonen doctrine, in which Finnish foreign affairs were kept strictly neutral and friendly with the USSR. Tanner managed to return to the Finnish parliament as a representative in the 1951 parliamentary elections. The acting foreign minister at the time, Åke Gartz, insisted that the head of the Finnish Social Democratic Party Emil Skog should try to keep Tanner away from the party. Skog retorted by saying that if Tanner's candidacy was blocked for foreign policy reasons, anyone else's candidacy could be blocked in the upcoming election for any reason. Tanner would go on to win the 1957 SDP chairman election. Tanner won the race by 1 vote. The party was internally divided due to Tanner's controversial past and eventually some representatives seceded and formed a new party called the Social Democratic Union of Workers and Smallholders aka TPSL. TPSL eventually reunited with SDP in December 1972.

Tanner won his final SDP chairman election in 1960 and resigned from his parliamentary seat in 1962 and the SDP's chairmanship in 1963, hence becoming the last member of the Eduskunta (Finnish parliament) elected in Finland's first parliamentary election in 1907 to be involved in parliamentary work. Tanner is also the only Finnish politician to have served as a member of the Eduskunta for seven different decades, and is also one of only four Finnish politicians (the others being Veikko Vennamo, Paavo Väyrynen and Pekka Haavisto) to have been a candidate for President of Finland three times without winning. Due to his aforementioned criticism of the Paasikivi-Kekkonen doctrine, his relationship with the later-President of Finland Urho Kekkonen became extremely strained, and after Tanner died in 1966 Kekkonen did not attend his funeral because he was on a ski trip. Only with the blessing of a long-serving parliamentarian was the presidency allowed to be represented by an aide-de-camp and wreath at Tanner's funeral.

== Personal life ==
Tanner met his future wife Linda (née Anttila; 1882–1978) in 1907 at a meeting of the Social Democratic Association of Students. They entered into a common-law marriage in 1909 and formalised their marriage in 1918 after civil marriage was legalised in Finland. They had eight children, one of whom, Maija Taka (1912–1984), became a medical doctor and writer.

== Cabinets ==
- Tanner Cabinet

Political offices
Preceded by Kyösti Kallio	Prime Minister of Finland; 1926–1927	Succeeded by Juho Sunila
Preceded by Juho Niukkanen	Minister of Finance (Finland); 1937–1939	Succeeded by Mauno Pekkala
Preceded by Eljas Erkko	Minister of Foreign Affairs (Finland); 1939–1940	Succeeded by Rolf Witting
Preceded by Rainer von Fieandt	Minister of Supply (Finland); 1940–1940	Succeeded by Väinö Kotilainen
Preceded by Toivo Salmio	Minister of Trade and Industry (Finland); 1941–1942	Succeeded by Uuno Takki
Preceded by Mauno Pekkala	Minister of Finance (Finland); 1942–1944	Succeeded by Onni Hiltunen
Non-profit organization positions
Preceded by G. J. D. C. Goedhart	President of the International Co-operative Alliance; 1927 – 1945	Succeeded by Robert Palmer
