= Arne Berner =

Finnish politician (1927–1988)

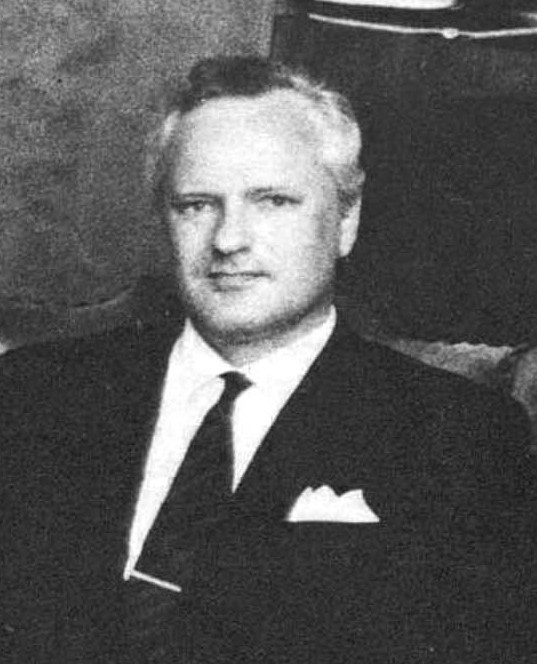
- Berner, 1970

Member of the Parliament of Finland
- In office 5 April 1966 – 21 January 1972
- Constituency: Kymi
Cabinet posts
Minister of Trade and Industry
In office 15 July 1970 – 29 October 1971
Prime Minister	Ahti Karjalainen
Preceded by	Olavi J. Mattila
Succeeded by	Gunnar Korhonen
In office 29 September 1976 – 15 May 1977
Prime Minister	Martti Miettunen
Preceded by	Eero Rantala
Succeeded by	Eero Rantala
Deputy Minister of Health and Social Affairs
In office 15 July 1970 – 29 October 1971
Prime Minister	Ahti Karjalainen
Preceded by	Katri-Helena Eskelinen
Succeeded by	Gunnar Korhonen
Deputy Minister of Foreign Affairs
In office 31 December 1982 – 6 May 1983
Prime Minister	Kalevi Sorsa
Preceded by	Esko Rekola
Succeeded by	Pertti Salolainen
Deputy Minister of Trade and Industry
In office 31 December 1982 – 6 May 1983
Prime Minister	Kalevi Sorsa
Preceded by	Matti Ahde
Succeeded by	Pertti Salolainen

Chairman of the Liberal People's Party
- In office 1982–1984
- Preceded by: Jaakko Itälä
- Succeeded by: Kyösti Lallukka

Personal details
- Born: Arne Morten Berner; 15 November 1927 Helsinki, Finland
- Died: 9 December 1988 (aged 61) Helsinki, Finland
- Party: Liberal People's Party

Arne Morten Berner (15 November 1927 – 9 December 1988) was a Finnish Liberal politician who held many ministerial offices.

== Career ==
Berner began his political career in the Liberal League, which merged with the People's Party of Finland in 1965 to form the Liberal People's Party (LKP). He served as a Member of Parliament for six years from 1966–1972. From 1970–1971 he was appointed as both Minister of Trade and Industry and Deputy Minister of Health and Social Affairs. He was appointed as Minister of Trade and Industry again from 1976–1977. In 1982, he was appointed as Deputy Minister of Foreign Affairs, Deputy Minister of Trade and Industry and Chairman of the Liberal People's Party.

== Personal life ==
His grandfather Sören Berner founded the family company Berner in 1883. His father Rolf Berner and his older brothers Harry Berner and Erik Berner were all CEOs of the company. Arne worked as a manager.

== See also ==
- List of Cabinet Ministers from Finland by ministerial portfolio
