= Paasikivi III cabinet =

Paasikivi III Cabinet
- 30th Cabinet of Finland
- Date formed: 17 April 1945
- Date dissolved: 26 March 1946

People and organisations
- Prime Minister: Juho Kusti Paasikivi
- Total no. of members: 21
- Member parties: SDP; SKDL; Agrarian League; National Progressive; RKP
- Status in legislature: Majority government

History
- Predecessor: Paasikivi II
- Successor: Pekkala

Juho Kusti Paasikivi's third cabinet was the 30th government of Republic of Finland. Cabinet's time period was from April 17, 1945 – March 26, 1946. It was Majority government.

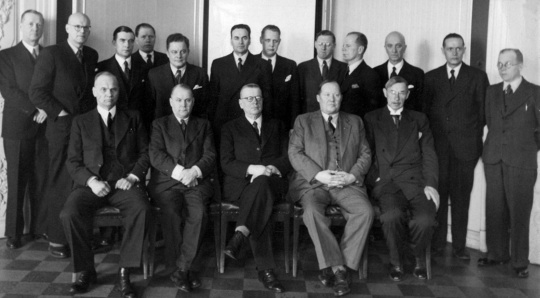
Paasikivi's III government (17.4.1945 - 26.3.1946). In the back row from the left: Attorney General Toivo Tarjanne, ministers Urho Kekkonen, Uuno Takki, Eemil Luukka, Kaarlo Hillilä, Yrjö Leino, Sakari Tuomioja, Eero A. Wuori, Onni Hiltunen, Eino Kilpi, Yrjö Murto ja Matti Janhunen. In the front row from the left: Kalle Jutila, Johan Helo, prime minister J.K. Paasikivi, ministers Mauno Pekkala and Reinhold Svento

Assembly
Minister	Period of office	Party
Prime Minister; Juho Kusti Paasikivi	April 17, 1945 – March 26, 1946	Independent
Minister at Council of State; Mauno Pekkala; Eero Wuori; Eino Kilpi	April 27, 1945 – March 26, 1946; April 27, 1945 – August 7, 1945; October 15, 1945 – March 26, 1946	People's Democratic League; Social Democrat; Social Democrat
Minister of Foreign Affairs; Carl Enckell	April 17, 1945 – March 26, 1946	Independent
Deputy Minister of Foreign Affairs; Reinhold Svento; Åke Gartz	April 17, 1945 – March 26, 1946; April 27, 1945 – March 26, 1946	Social Democrat; Independent
Minister of Justice; Urho Kekkonen	April 17, 1945 – March 26, 1946	Agrarian League
Minister of Defence; Mauno Pekkala	April 17, 1945 – March 26, 1946	People's Democratic League
Minister of Interior; Yrjö Leino	April 17, 1945 – March 26, 1946	People's Democratic League
Deputy Minister of the Interior; Eemil Luukka	April 17, 1945 – March 26, 1946	Agrarian League
Minister of Finance; Sakari Tuomioja Ralf Törngren	April 17, 1945 – July 17, 1945; July 17, 1945 – March 26, 1946	National Progressive Party; Swedish People's Party
Deputy Minister of Finance; Eemil Luukka	April 17, 1945 – March 26, 1946	Agrarian League
Minister of Education; Johan Helo Eino Pekkala	April 17, 1945 – December 28, 1945; December 28, 1945 – March 26, 1946	People's Democratic League; People's Democratic League
Minister of Agriculture; Kalle Jutila Vihtori Vesterinen	April 17, 1945 – September 29, 1945; November 9, 1945 – March 26, 1946	Agrarian League; Agrarian League
Deputy Minister of Agriculture; Eemil Luukka	April 17, 1945 – March 26, 1946	Agrarian League
Minister of Transport and Public Works; Eero Wuori; Onni Peltonen	April 17, 1945 – September 29, 1945; November 9, 1945 – March 26, 1946	Social Democrat; Social Democrat
Deputy Minister of Transport and Public Works; Yrjö Murto; Kaarlo Hillilä; Onni Hiltunen	April 17, 1945 – March 26, 1946; November 22, 1945– March 26, 1946; February 14, 1946 – March 26, 1946	People's Democratic League; Agrarian League; Social Democrat
Minister of Trade and Industry; Åke Gartz	April 17, 1945 – March 26, 1946	Independent
Deputy Minister of Trade and Industry; Uuno Takki	April 17, 1945 – March 26, 1946	Social Democrat
Minister of Social Affairs; Eino Kilpi	April 17, 1945 – March 26, 1946	Social Democrat
Deputy Minister of Social Affairs; Matti Janhunen; Eero Wuori; Kaarlo Hillilä; Onni Hiltunen	April 17, 1945 – March 26, 1946; April 27, 1945 – September 29, 1945; November 22, 1945 – March 26, 1946; February 14, 1946–March 26, 1946	People's Democratic League; Social Democrat; Agrarian League; Social Democrat
Minister of People's Service; Kaarlo Hillilä	April 17, 1945 – March 26, 1946	Agrarian League
Deputy Minister of People's Service; Uuno Takki; Eero Wuori; Onni Hiltunen	April 17, 1945 – March 26, 1946; April 27, 1945 – September 29, 1945; February 14, 1946 – March 26, 1946	Social Democrat; Social Democrat

Preceded by Paasikivi II	Cabinet of Finland; April 17, 1945–March 26, 1946	Succeeded by Pekkala
