= Sakari Tuomioja =

Finnish politician and diplomat (1911–1964)

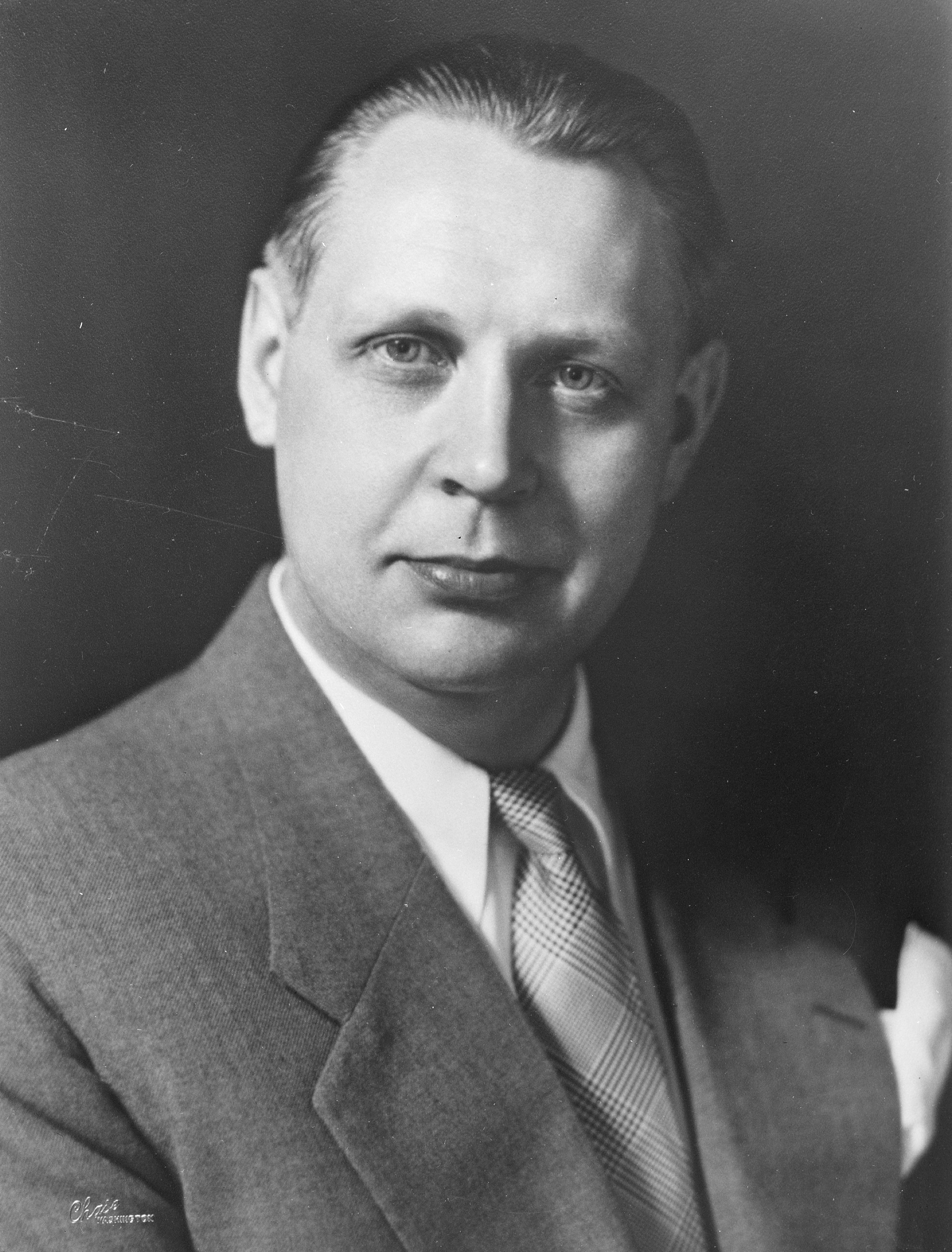
- Tuomioja in 1952

22nd Prime Minister of Finland
- In office 17 November 1953 – 5 May 1954
- President: Juho K. Paasikivi
- Preceded by: Urho Kekkonen
- Succeeded by: Ralf Törngren

Minister of Foreign Affairs
- In office 20 September 1951 – 26 November 1952
- Prime Minister: Urho Kekkonen
- Preceded by: Åke Gartz
- Succeeded by: Urho Kekkonen

Minister of Trade and Industry
- In office 17 March 1950 – 30 September 1950
- Prime Minister: Urho Kekkonen
- Preceded by: Uuno Takki
- Succeeded by: Teuvo Aura

Minister of Finance
- In office 17 April 1945 – 17 July 1945
- Prime Minister: Juho K. Paasikivi
- Preceded by: Johan Helo
- Succeeded by: Ralf Törngren

Personal details
- Born: Sakari Severi Tuomioja; 29 August 1911 Tampere, Finland
- Died: 9 September 1964 (aged 53) Helsinki, Finland
- Party: National Progressive (until 1951); Liberal League (from 1951)
- Spouse: Vappu Tuomioja
- Children: 2, including Erkki

Sakari Severi Tuomioja (29 August 1911 – 9 September 1964) was a Finnish politician and diplomat who served as Prime Minister of Finland between 1953–1954 and as Minister for Foreign Affairs between 1951–1952 and as the Governor of the Bank of Finland between 1945–1955. He was also Finland's ambassador in London and Stockholm.

Tuomioja was the first Finn to serve in high-level United Nations missions. In particular, he is remembered for acting as a mediator in the Cyprus crisis of 1963–64 and for his abrupt death in the performance of his duties. Tuomioja was also the first Finnish invited to the Bilderberg Group meetings.

== Life ==
Sakari Tuomioja's spouse was Vappu Tuomioja (née Wuolijoki), and they had two children, daughter Tuuli and son Erkki who has followed his father career in politics as Foreign Minister.

The parents of Sakari Tuomioja were Walto Wihtori Tuomioja and Laina Sofia Tuomioja (née. Boman). Walto Wihtori Tuomioja was Leader of the National Progressive Party and Member of Parliament, and Eljas Erkko's predecessor as Editor-in-Chief in Helsingin Sanomat newspaper.

Tuomioja began undergraduate studies in 1929 and graduated as a Bachelor of Law in 1937. He received the rank of Master of Law in 1940. Tuomioja graduated as a lawyer in 1949. Tuomioja worked as secretary of the Finance Committee in the 1930s and secretary of state auditors.

He started his duties as Secretary of State of the Ministry of Finance in 1940.

Tuomioja was released from conscription for reasons of health. Tuomioja was appointed Governor of the Bank of Finland, in 1945 after Risto Ryti had resigned because of his sentencing for war guilt.

== Career ==
Tuomioja served as Minister of Finance in the Paasikivi II and Paasikivi III Government's between 1944-1945 representing the Progressive Party.

Between 1950 and 1951, he was Minister of Trade and Industry and Minister of Foreign Affairs in the Kekkonen I Government. Between 1951 and 1952, he was Minister for Foreign Affairs in the Kekkonen III Government. Tuomioja was appointed on 11 April 1950 to head the Finnish delegation in trade negotiations with the Soviet Union. A five-year trade agreement was agreed and signed on 13 June.

As Finland fought for economic difficulties at the beginning of the 1950s, the export industry had to work to improve its position. Talks on the cost crisis brought Tuomioja together with Teuvo Aura to devise a hard-to-find cost reduction program. Tuomioja did see devaluation as solution. Urho Kekkonen, who served as Prime Minister, was suspicious of the program but started to drive it.

Eventually, Kekkonen's Cabinet fell when the Social Democratic Party opposed the implementation of the program, after which a minority government chaired by the Agrarian Party was formed with Kekkonen as Prime Minister.

When the program of Tuomioja and Aura developed from the knockout of Social Democrats and the Labour Union began, the employers also saw it as unrealistic. Kekkonen asked Tuomioja to prepare a new economic program for the government, which would allow for a sufficient majority of votes.

However, in the end, the situation ended up with the formation of a government headed by Tuomioja, the resignation of Kekkonen and the organization of new elections. The case led to a breach between Tuomioja and Kekkonen's previously very close and long-term relationship.

After serving as Prime Minister from 1953–1954, Tuomioja was the presidential candidate of the Liberal League and National Coalition Party in the 1956 presidential elections, where he had the third highest number of votes in the first round, receiving 57.

== Diplomatic career ==
Tuomioja resigned from the duties of the Governor of the Bank of Finland in 1955, after being elected as Finland's Ambassador to London. He was in London until 1957 and later served as Ambassador of Finland to Stockholm in 1961–1964.

Tuomioja was the first Finnish person to be appointed to the United Nations. He served as Secretary General of the United Nations Economic Commission for Europe in 1957–1960 and chaired the Laos Economic Commission in 1959 and 1961.

Tuomioja did not apply for a further extension after the first three years in the European Economic Commission, and finally returned to Finland where he was thought to be planning to become a candidate for the 1962 presidential election.

The President canditateship of Tuomioja against President Kekkonen was not attracted and he was also absent from the formation of the Honka Union against Kekkonen.

When returning to Finland, Tuomioja started work as a negotiating officer for the Ministry of Foreign Affairs on 1 November 1960. He was appointed to the Ambassador to Stockholm next spring as of 1 July 1961.

UN Secretary General U Thant invited Tuomioja to be a mediator during the Cyprus crisis in April 1964. Tuomioja suffered a brain hemorrhage on August 16, 1964 when he was performing his mediator's duties in Cyprus. He was flown on a special airplane from Geneva to Finland on September 3. Tuomioja died at the Kivelä Hospital in Helsinki at the presence of his family on Wednesday, September 9, 1964.

The UN Security Council paid respects to Tuomioja with a minute of silence. Secretary-General U Thant said in his memo that Tuomioja served meritoriously not only as a patriot but also as a very skilful UN mediator. He was succeeded by Galo Plaza as mediator in the Cyprus dispute.

Government offices
Preceded by Risto Ryti	Governor of the Bank of Finland; 1945-1955	Succeeded by Rainer von Fieandt
Political offices
Preceded by Åke Gartz	Foreign Minister of Finland; 1951-1952	Succeeded by Urho Kekkonen
Preceded by Urho Kekkonen	Prime Minister of Finland; 1953-1954	Succeeded by Ralf Törngren
