= Åke Gartz =

Finnish politician (1888–1974)

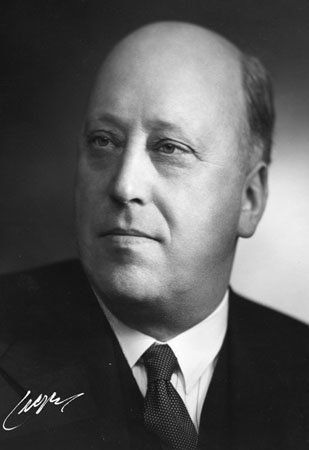

Minister of Foreign Affairs
- In office 17 March 1950 – 20 September 1951
- Prime Minister: Urho Kekkonen
- Preceded by: Carl Enckell
- Succeeded by: Sakari Tuomioja

Minister of Trade and Industry
- In office 17 November 1944 – 26 March 1946
- Prime Minister: Juho K. Passikivi
- Preceded by: Uuno Takki
- Succeeded by: Uuno Takki

Personal details
- Born: Åke Henrik Gartz; 9 June 1888 Helsinki, Grand Duchy of Finland
- Died: 29 November 1974 (aged 86) Karis, Finland

Åke Henrik Gartz (9 June 1888 in Helsinki – 29 November 1974 in Karis) was a Finnish politician. He served as Minister of Trade and Industry in the J. K. Paasikivi II and III Cabinet from 1944 to 1946 and in the Kekkonen I and II Cabinet as Minister of Foreign Affairs from 1950 to 1951.

Gartz was an Independent politician and did not represent any party, but was counted close to the Swedish People's Party.

Gartz graduated as a Bachelor of Philosophy in 1909 and a Bachelor of Law in 1914. He received the honorary title in 1917.

As Minister Gartz came from industry and employers' organizations; He was deputy director of A. Ahlström since 1931 and chairman of the Board of Directors of Finnish Association of Employers.

After his ministry, Gartz served as Envoy of Finland in Bern 1951–1953 and in Bucharest and Moscow from 1953 to 1955 (1954–1955 as Ambassador).

Åke Gartz received the honorary title of Vuorineuvos in 1940.

Political offices
Preceded by Carl Enckell	Minister of Foreign Affairs; 1950–1951	Succeeded by Sakari Tuomioja
Preceded by Uuno Takki	Minister of Trade and Industry; 1944–1946	Succeeded by Uuno Takki
