= Väinö Hupli =

Finnish journalist and politician

Väinö Aleksander Hupli (8 June 1886 in Viipurin maalaiskunta – 27 August 1934 in Marienbad, Czechoslovakia) was a Finnish journalist and politician. He was a Member of the Parliament of Finland for the Social Democratic Party of Finland from 1919 to 1922 and a Minister of Trade and Industry from 1926 to 1927 in the cabinet of Väinö Tanner.
