= Axel Palmgren =

Finnish lawyer and politician

Axel Palmgren (3 March 1867 in Helsinki – 19 February 1939) was a Finnish lawyer, civil servant, business executive and politician. He served as Minister of Trade and Industry from 31 May 1924 to 31 March 1925 and again from 21 March 1931 to 14 December 1932. He was a member of the Parliament of Finland from 1917 to 1922 and again from 1924 to 1936, representing the Swedish People's Party of Finland (SFP).
