= Teuvo Aura =

Finnish politician and jurist (1912–1999)

Ylipormestari (High Mayor) Teuvo Aura
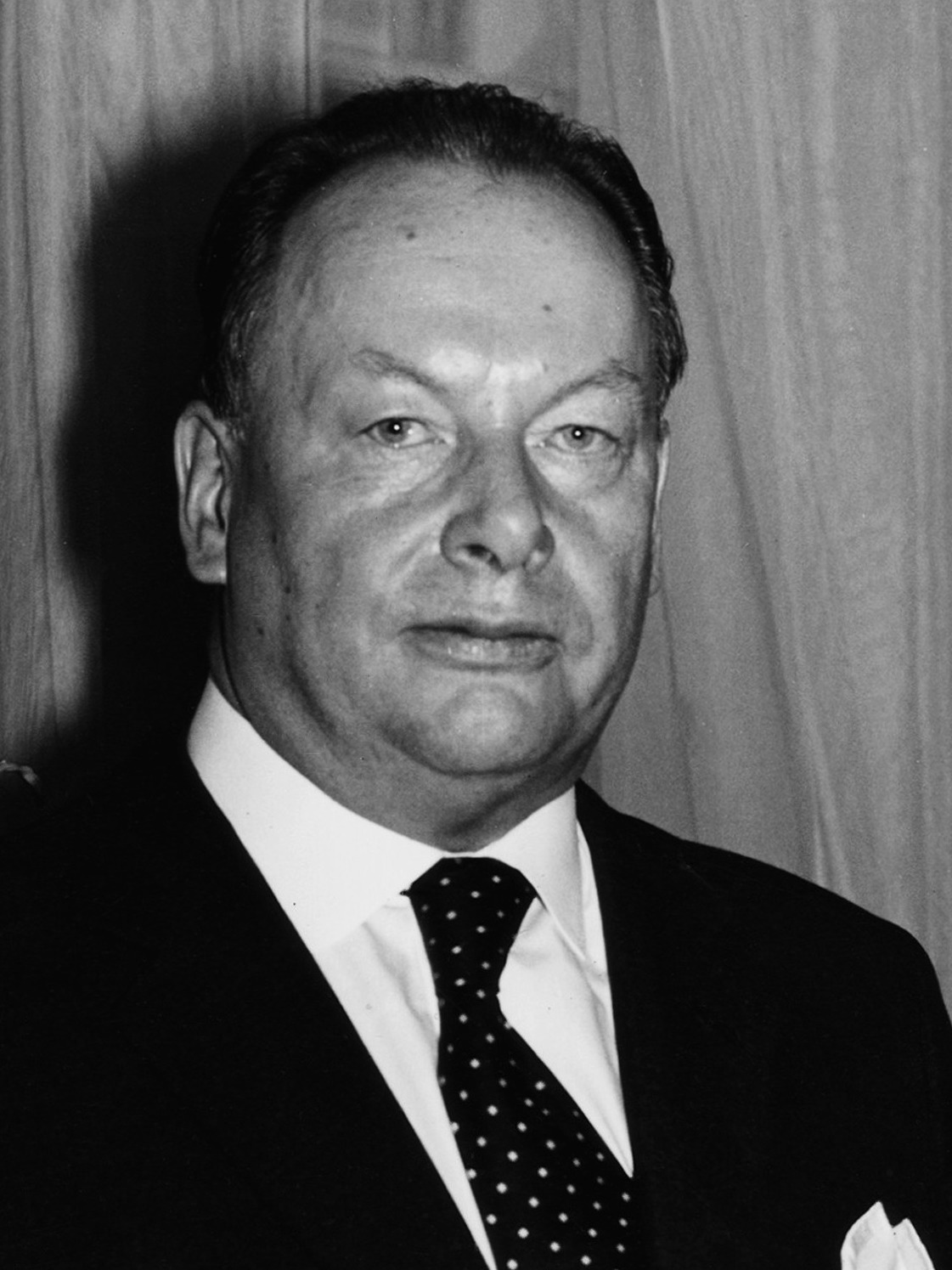
- Aura in 1972.

33rd Prime Minister of Finland
- In office 29 October 1971 – 23 February 1972
- President: Urho Kekkonen
- Deputy: Päiviö Hetemäki
- Preceded by: Ahti Karjalainen
- Succeeded by: Rafael Paasio
- In office 14 May 1970 – 15 July 1970
- President: Urho Kekkonen
- Deputy: Päiviö Hetemäki
- Preceded by: Mauno Koivisto
- Succeeded by: Ahti Karjalainen

Mayor of Helsinki
- In office 1968–1979
- Preceded by: Lauri Aho
- Succeeded by: Raimo Ilaskivi

Minister of the Interior
- In office 2 September 1957 – 29 November 1957
- Prime Minister: V. J. Sukselainen
- Preceded by: Urho Kiukas
- Succeeded by: Harras Kyttä

Minister of Trade and Industry
- In office 9 July 1953 – 5 May 1954
- Prime Minister: Urho Kekkonen; Sakari Tuomioja
- Preceded by: Penna Tervo
- Succeeded by: Penna Tervo
- In office 30 September 1950 – 17 January 1951
- Prime Minister: Urho Kekkonen
- Preceded by: Sakari Tuomioja
- Succeeded by: Penna Tervo

Minister of Justice
- In office 17 January 1951 – 20 September 1951
- Prime Minister: Urho Kekkonen
- Preceded by: Heikki Kannisto
- Succeeded by: Urho Kekkonen

Personal details
- Born: Teuvo Ensio Aura; 28 December 1912 Ruskeala, Finland
- Died: 11 January 1999 (aged 86) Helsinki, Finland
- Party: Liberal People's; National Progressive (formerly)
- Spouse(s): Sirkka Kosonen (1944-2000) (m. 1976); Kaino Kielo Kivekäs (1939–1970)
- Education: University of Helsinki
- Profession: Lawyer

Teuvo Ensio Aura (28 December 1912, in Ruskeala – 11 January 1999, in Helsinki) was a Finnish politician of the Liberal People's Party. He served as Mayor of Helsinki and interim Prime Minister of Finland twice, in 1970 and 1971–72.

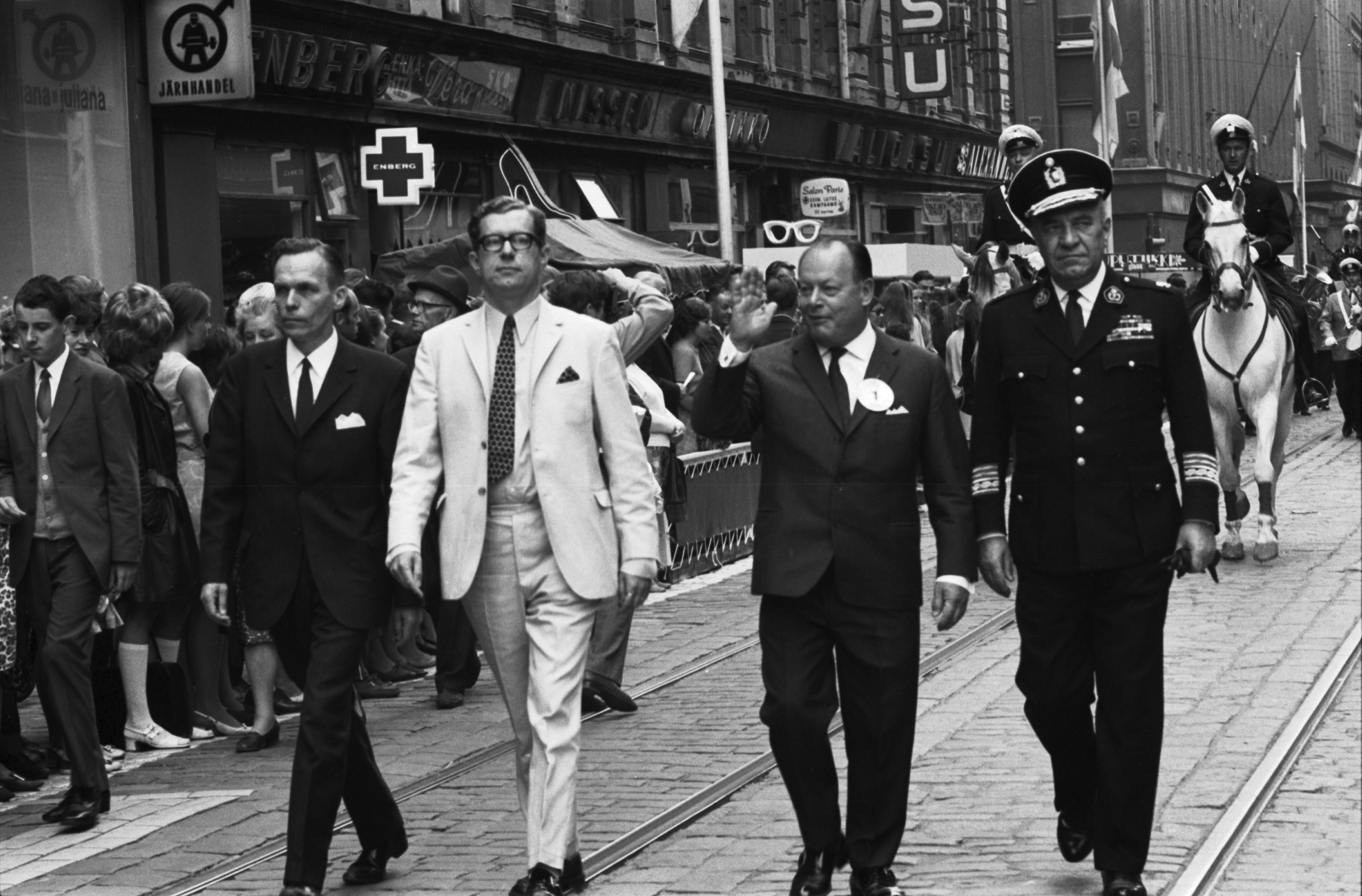
Prime Minister Teuvo Aura (third from the left) and city councillor Panu Toivonen (second from the left) at the opening parade in June 1970 when Aleksanterinkatu street in Helsinki was temporarily reserved for pedestrians only. (Photograph by Eeva Rista)

== Cabinets ==
- Aura I Cabinet
- Aura II Cabinet

== See also ==
- Timeline of Helsinki, 1960s-1970s

Political offices
Preceded by Mauno Koivisto	Prime Ministers of Finland; 1970	Succeeded by Ahti Karjalainen
Preceded by Ahti Karjalainen	Prime Ministers of Finland; 1971–1972	Succeeded by Rafael Paasio
Preceded by Lauri Aho	Mayor of Helsinki; 1968–1979	Succeeded by Raimo Ilaskivi
