= Penna Tervo =

Finnish politician

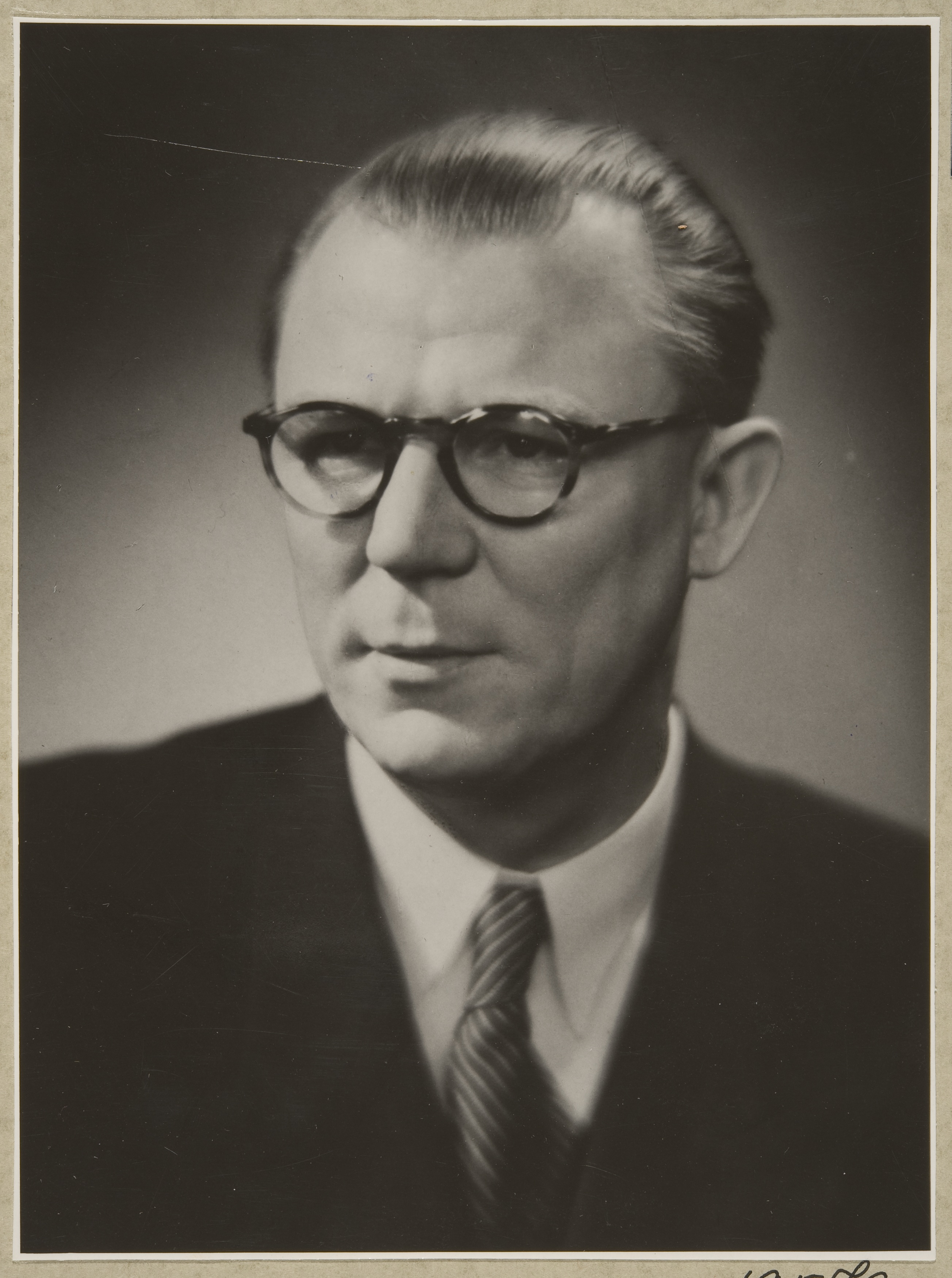
Penna Tervo.

Penna Tervo (10 November 1901, in Viipuri – 26 February 1956, in Tuusula) was a Finnish politician. He served as Minister of Trade and Industry from 17 January 1951 to 8 July 1953 and again from 5 May to 20 October 1954. He also served as Minister of Finance from 20 October 1954 until his death on 26 February 1956. He was a member of the Parliament of Finland from 1945 until his death in 1956, representing the Social Democratic Party of Finland (SDP). He died in a car accident.
