= Minister of Trade and Industry (Finland) =

The minister of trade and industry (Finnish: kauppa- ja teollisuusministeri) was one of the ministerial portfolios in the Finnish Government from 1918 to 2008.

In 2008, the position was replaced by Minister of Economic Affairs.

== List of ministers of trade and industry ==
Minister	Party	In office
Julius Stjernvall	Swedish People's Party	27.11.1918 – 17.4.1919
Juho Vennola	National Progressive Party	17.4.1919 – 15.8.1919
Eero Erkko	National Progressive Party	15.8.1919 – 15.3.1920
Leo Ehrnrooth	Swedish People's Party	15.3.1920 – 12.8.1920
Hjalmar J. Procopé	Swedish People's Party	19.8.1920 – 9.4.1921
Erkki Makkonen	National Progressive Party	9.4.1921 – 2.6.1922
Aukusti Aho	Non-partisan	2.6.1922 – 18.1.1924
Hjalmar J. Procopé	Swedish People's Party	19.1.1924 – 31.5.1924
Axel Palmgren	Swedish People's Party	31.5.1924 – 31.3.1925
Yrjö Pulkkinen	National Coalition Party	31.3.1925 – 31.12.1925
Tyko Reinikka	Agrarian League	31.12.1925 – 13.12.1926
Väinö Hupli	Social Democratic Party	13.12.1926 – 17.12.1927
Pekka Heikkinen	Agrarian League	17.12.1927 – 22.12.1928
Kyösti Järvinen	Non-partisan	22.12.1928 – 16.8.1929
Pekka Heikkinen	Agrarian League	16.8.1929 – 4.7.1930
Axel Solitander	Non-partisan	4.7.1930 – 21.3.1931
Axel Palmgren	Swedish People's Party	21.3.1931 – 14.12.1932
Ilmari Killinen	National Progressive Party	30.12.1932 – 6.3.1936
Väinö Arola	Agrarian League	6.3.1936 – 7.10.1936
Kalle Kauppi	National Progressive Party	7.10.1936 – 12.3.1937
Väinö Voionmaa	Social Democratic Party	12.3.1937 – 1.12.1938
Väinö Kotilainen	Non-partisan	1.12.1939 – 15.8.1940
Toivo Salmio	Social Democratic Party	23.8.1940 – 3.7.1941
Väinö Tanner	Social Democratic Party	3.7.1941 – 22.5.1942
Uuno Takki	Social Democratic Party	22.5.1942 – 17.11.1944
Åke Gartz	Non-partisan	17.11.1944 – 26.3.1946
Uuno Takki	Social Democratic Party	26.3.1946 – 17.3.1950
Sakari Tuomioja	National Progressive Party	17.3.1950 – 30.9.1950
Teuvo Aura	National Progressive Party	30.9.1950 – 17.1.1951
Penna Tervo	Social Democratic Party	17.1.1951 – 9.7.1953
Teuvo Aura	National Progressive Party	9.7.1953 – 5.5.1954
Penna Tervo	Social Democratic Party	5.5.1954 – 20.10.1954
Aarre Simonen	Social Democratic Party	20.10.1954 – 3.3.1956
Kauno Kleemola	Agrarian League	3.3.1956 – 27.5.1957
Esa Kaitila	People's Party	27.5.1957 – 29.11.1957
Lauri Kivekäs	Non-partisan	29.11.1957 – 29.8.1958
Onni Hiltunen	Social Democratic Party	29.8.1958 – 13.1.1959
Ahti Karjalainen	Agrarian League	13.1.1959 – 19.6.1961
Björn Westerlund	Swedish People's Party	19.6.1961 – 14.7.1961
Ilmari Hustich	Non-partisan	14.7.1961 – 13.4.1962
Toivo Wiherheimo	National Coalition Party	13.4.1962 – 18.12.1963
Olavi J. Mattila	Non-partisan	18.12.1963 – 12.9.1964
Toivo Wiherheimo	National Coalition Party	12.9.1964 – 27.5.1966
Olavi Salonen	Social Democratic Party	27.5.1966 – 22.3.1968
Grels Teir	Swedish People's Party	22.3.1968 – 14.5.1970
Olavi J. Mattila	Non-partisan	14.5.1970 – 15.7.1970
Arne Berner	Liberal People's Party	15.7.1970 – 29.10.1971
Gunnar Korhonen	Non-partisan	29.10.1971 – 23.2.1972
Jussi Linnamo	Social Democratic Party	23.2.1972 – 4.9.1972
Grels Teir	Swedish People's Party	4.9.1972 – 31.12.1972
Jan-Magnus Jansson	Swedish People's Party	1.1.1973 – 30.9.1974
Kristian Gestrin	Swedish People's Party	1.10.1974 – 13.6.1975
Arvo Rytkönen	Non-partisan	13.6.1975 – 30.11.1975
Eero Rantala	Social Democratic Party	30.11.1975 – 29.9.1976
Arne Berner	Liberal People's Party	29.9.1976 – 15.5.1977
Eero Rantala	Social Democratic Party	15.5.1977 – 26.5.1979
Ulf Sundqvist	Social Democratic Party	26.5.1979 – 30.6.1981
Pirkko Työläjärvi	Social Democratic Party	1.7.1981 – 19.2.1982
Esko Ollila	Centre Party	19.2.1982 – 6.5.1983
Seppo Lindblom	Social Democratic Party	6.5.1983 – 30.4.1987
Ilkka Suominen	National Coalition Party	30.4.1987 – 26.4.1991
Kauko Juhantalo	Centre Party	26.4.1991 – 3.8.1992
Pekka Tuomisto	Centre Party	3.8.1992 – 31.7.1993
Seppo Kääriäinen	Centre Party	1.8.1993 – 13.4.1995
Antti Kalliomäki	Social Democratic Party	13.4.1995 – 15.4.1999
Erkki Tuomioja	Social Democratic Party	15.4.1999 – 25.2.2000
Sinikka Mönkäre	Social Democratic Party	25.2.2000 – 17.4.2003
Mauri Pekkarinen	Centre Party	17.4.2003 – 1.1.2008
