= Onni Koski =

Finnish trade union leader and politician (1913–1999)

Onni Hilkia Koski (20 December 1890 – 27 February 1999) was a Finnish trade union leader and politician, born in Halikko. He was a member of the Social Democratic Union of Workers and Smallholders. He served as Deputy Minister of Finance from 13 April 1962 to 18 October 1963. He was the president of the Railway Workers' Union from 1957 to 1973.
