= Kauko Juhantalo =

Finnish politician (1942–2020)

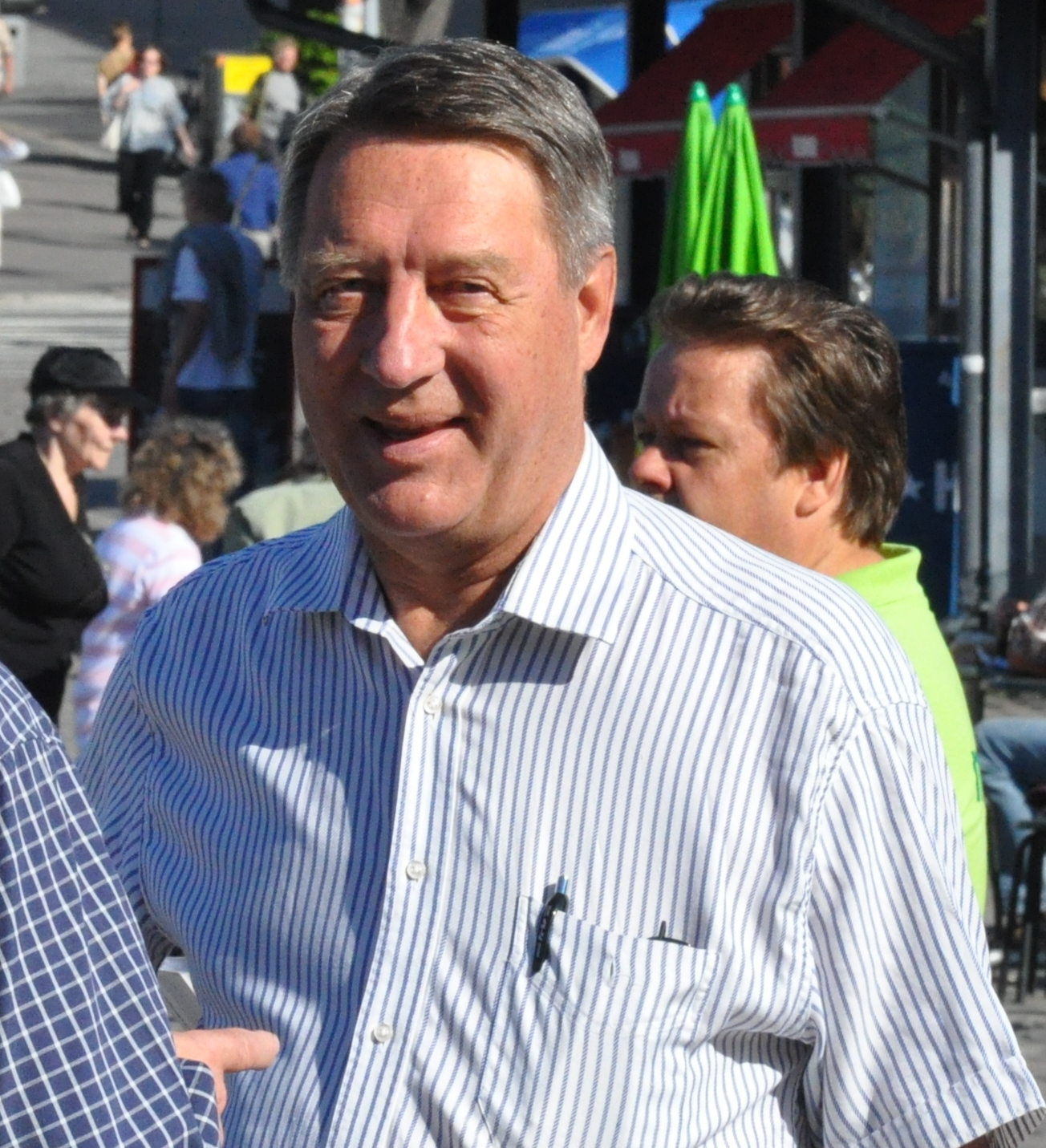

Member of Parliament for Satakunta
- In office 22 April 2015 – 16 April 2019
- In office 2003–2007
- In office 1995–1999
- In office 1979–1993

Minister of Trade and Industry
- In office 26 April 1991 – 2 August 1992
- Preceded by: Ilkka Suominen
- Succeeded by: Pekka Tuomisto

Personal details
- Born: 28 April 1942 Kankaanpää, Finland
- Died: 26 April 2020 (aged 77)
- Party: Centre Party
- Education: University of Turku

Kauko Johannes Juhantalo (28 April 1942 – 26 April 2020) was a Finnish politician. A member of the Centre Party, he was member of the Parliament from the electoral district of Satakunta and Minister of Trade and Industry.

== Early life and education ==
Juhantalo was born and raised in Kankaanpää, Satakunta. He graduated from the University of Turku as Master of Laws in 1972.

== Career ==
After graduating from law school, Juhantalo worked as a lawyer. He was first elected to the Parliament in 1979. In 1991, Juhantalo was appointed Minister of Trade and Industry in the Aho Cabinet.

Juhantalo resigned from the government in 1992 when it was revealed that he had insisted that Säästöpankkien Keskus-Osake-Pankki give him a bank loan so that the government acquire a portion of Tampella owned by the bank. In 1993, Juhantalo was impeached and convicted of insisting on a bribe and sentenced to conditional discharge for a year. He was also expelled from the Parliament.

Juhantalo returned to the Parliament at the 1995 election. He failed to win a new term in 1999 but was re-elected in 2003. After a second election defeat in 2007, Juhantalo was once again re-elected in 2015 election. He was a member of the Finance Committee of the Parliament. In addition, he was serving as the chairman of the city council of Kankaanpää.

== Death ==
Juhantalo died of cancer on 26 April 2020, two days before his 78th birthday.
