= Reinhold Svento =

Finnish politician

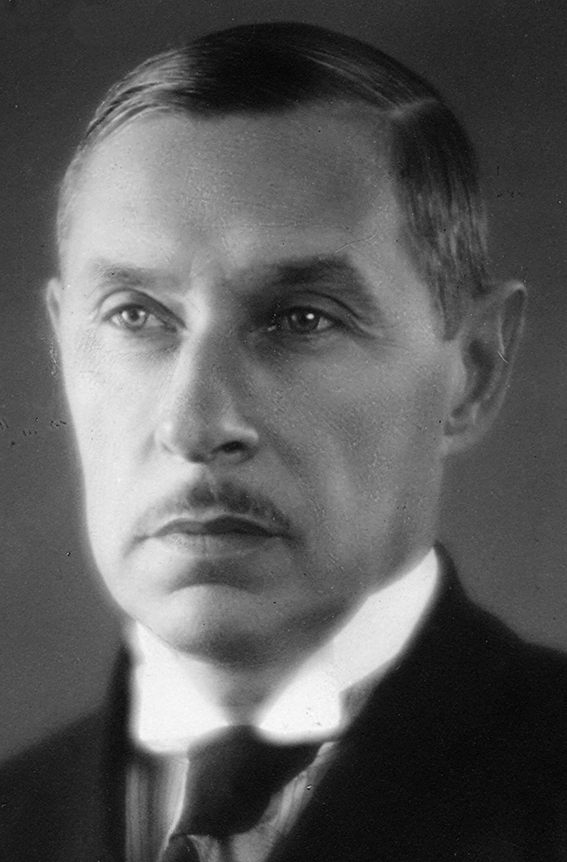
Reinhold Svento in 1948.

Reinhold Konstantin Svento (until 1938 Sventorzetsky, July 24, 1881, St. Petersburg, Russian Empire - March 30, 1973 Lappeenranta) was a Finnish politician who served as a speaker of the Finnish Social Democratic Party between 1922 and 1945 and MP from the Finnish People's Democratic League 1945-1948, 1944-1948 as II Foreign Minister in three Governments and 1948-1951 as Envoy of Finland to Bern. Svento, also a member of the Helsinki City Council, also acted as a five-times electoral in presidential elections.

== Biography ==
Sventorzetsky graduated from the University of St. Petersburg in 1907 and worked as an official in General Governor's Office, but had to resign in 1914 at the request by Governor Franz Seyn. After the Civil War, Social Democrat Sventorzetski served as a journalist for several Social Democratic journals. In the parliamentary election in 1922 he was elected to the parliament from the constituency of the Mikkeli County. Sventorzetsky wrote to the Social Democratic main vocalist newspaper Social Democrat from 1918-1920 and 1924-1944.

In the 1920s, Sventorzetsky belonged to the left of the SDP and to the so-called Huplian Opposition. He was elected to the party committee at the 1926 party congress. That same year, Sventorzetsky objected to his party's move to the government. Sventorzetsky, representing the moderate opposition in the 1930s, was one of the leading foreign policy experts in the party.

From the 1920s Svento supported the cooperation between Social Democrats and Agrarian League. In 1937, Svento published the book The Worker and Peasant, in which he considered the government of the Social Democrats and the Agrarian League essential for the maintenance of a democratic society under the pressure of fascism and communism.

In the following year, Finland's foreign policy appeared, in which Svento warned of the difficult position of Finland in the event of a possible war. Svento did not believe the importance of ideological issues in foreign policy and he favored a neutral balancing between the great powers. In the negotiations between Finland and the Soviet Union in the autumn of 1939, Svento demanded absolute neutrality from Finland.

After the Winter War he considered the conflict as a major imperialism of the Great powers. During the Continuation War., Svento was involved in the peace opposition movement.

After the Continuation War, Svento moved to the People's Democratic League with many other Social Democratic party leaders who were divided in the party's policy. As a Foreign Minister in April 1948, Svento was a member of the Negotiation delegation considering the Finno-Soviet Treaty. In September 1955, he was a member of the delegation led by President J. K. Paasikivi, with whom the Soviet Union agreed to return the Porkkala Base back to Finland. At the end of her public career, Svento was part of the Finnish delegation to the United Nations in 1955-1958.

Reinhold Svento and First Foreign Minister Carl Enckell often used to talk and exchange correspondence with each other in Russian. Both had served as civil servant at the Minister–Secretary of States Office in St. Petersburg. The role of Svento and Enckell as assistants and advisers to J. K. Paasikivi also underlined the fact that the head of the Political Department's highest official of the Ministry of Foreign Affairs was held throughout their ministry without the holder. Reinhold Svento received the honor of the Minister in 1971.

== Family ==
Reinhold Svento's first spouse from 1907 to 1953 was Antti Hackzell's sister Evi Hackzell. Their son was Truvor Svento, a promising composer who fell in the Winter War. Their daughter Marina married Lieutenant General, Mannerheim Cross Knight Martti Miettinen. Reinhold Svento's second spouse since 1968 was Helvi Inkeri Dillström
