= Minister for Foreign Affairs (Finland) =

Finnish cabinet position

The minister for foreign affairs (Finnish: ulkoministeri, Swedish: utrikesminister) handles the Finnish Government's foreign policy and relations, and is in charge of the Ministry for Foreign Affairs. The minister for foreign trade and development is also associated with this ministry. The current minister for foreign affairs is Elina Valtonen of National Coalition Party.

== Constitutional mandate ==
Section 93 (Competence in the area of foreign policy issues) of the Constitution of Finland says the following:

The foreign policy of Finland is directed by the President of the Republic in co-operation with the Government.

However, the Parliament accepts Finland’s international obligations and their denouncement and decides on the bringing into force of Finland’s international obligations in so far as provided in this Constitution. The President decides on matters of war and peace, with the consent of the Parliament.

The Government is responsible for the national preparation of the decisions to be made in the European Union, and decides on the concomitant Finnish measures, unless the decision requires the approval of the Parliament.

The Parliament participates in the national preparation of decisions to be made in the European Union, as provided in this Constitution.

The communication of important foreign policy positions to foreign States and international organisations is the responsibility of the Minister with competence in foreign affairs.

This last paragraph specifies the constitutional responsibility of the minister for foreign affairs.

== List of ministers for foreign affairs ==
No.	Portrait	Minister	Took office	Left office	Time in office	Party	Cabinet
1	Otto Stenroth	Otto Stenroth (1861–1939)	27 May 1918	27 November 1918	184 days	Young Finnish	Paasikivi I
2	Carl Enckell	Carl Enckell (1876–1959)	27 November 1918	28 April 1919	152 days	Independent	Ingman I K. Castrén
3	Rudolf Holsti	Rudolf Holsti (1881–1945)	28 April 1919	20 May 1922	3 years, 22 days	National Progressive	K. Castrén; Vennola I Erich; Vennola II
(2)	Carl Enckell	Carl Enckell (1876–1959)	2 June 1922	14 November 1922	165 days	Independent	Cajander I
4	Juho Vennola	Juho Vennola (1872–1938)	14 November 1922	18 January 1924	1 year, 65 days	National Progressive	Kallio I
(2)	Carl Enckell	Carl Enckell (1876–1959)	18 January 1924	31 May 1924	134 days	Independent	Cajander II
5	Hjalmar Procopé	Hjalmar Procopé (1889–1954)	31 May 1924	31 March 1925	304 days	RKP	Ingman II
6	Gustaf Idman	Gustaf Idman (1885–1961)	31 March 1925	31 December 1925	275 days	Independent	Tulenheimo
7	Emil Nestor Setälä	Emil Nestor Setälä (1864–1935)	31 December 1925	13 December 1926	347 days	National Coalition	Kallio II
8	Väinö Voionmaa	Väinö Voionmaa (1869–1947)	13 December 1926	17 December 1927	1 year, 4 days	SDP	Tanner
(5)	Hjalmar Procopé	Hjalmar Procopé (1889–1954)	17 December 1927	21 March 1931	3 years, 94 days	Independent	Sunila I Mantere; Kallio III; Svinhufvud II
9	Aarno Yrjö-Koskinen	Aarno Yrjö-Koskinen (1885–1951)	21 March 1931	14 December 1932	1 year, 268 days	National Coalition	Sunila II
10	Antti Hackzell	Antti Hackzell (1881–1946)	14 December 1932	7 October 1936	3 years, 298 days	Independent	Kivimäki
(3)	Rudolf Holsti	Rudolf Holsti (1881–1945)	7 October 1936	16 November 1938	2 years, 40 days	National Progressive	Kallio IV; Cajander III
(8)	Väinö Voionmaa	Väinö Voionmaa (1869–1947)	16 November 1938	1 December 1938	15 days	SDP	Cajander III
11	Eljas Erkko	Eljas Erkko (1895–1965)	12 December 1938	1 December 1939	354 days	National Progressive	Cajander III
12	Väinö Tanner	Väinö Tanner (1881–1966)	1 December 1939	27 March 1940	117 days	SDP	Ryti I
13	Rolf Witting	Rolf Witting (1879–1944)	27 March 1940	5 March 1943	2 years, 343 days	RKP	Ryti II; Rangell
14	Carl Henrik Ramsay	Carl Henrik Ramsay (1886–1951)	5 March 1943	8 August 1944	1 year, 156 days	RKP	Linkomies
(2)	Carl Enckell	Carl Enckell (1876–1959)	8 August 1944	17 March 1950	5 years, 221 days	Independent	Hackzell; U. Castrén; Paasikivi II-III; Pekkala; Fagerholm I
15	Åke Gartz	Åke Gartz (1888–1974)	17 March 1950	20 September 1951	1 year, 187 days	Independent	Kekkonen I-II
16	Sakari Tuomioja	Sakari Tuomioja (1911–1964)	20 September 1951	26 November 1952	1 year, 67 days	Independent	Kekkonen III
17	Urho Kekkonen	Urho Kekkonen (1900–1986)	26 November 1952	9 July 1953	225 days	Centre	Kekkonen III
18	Ralf Törngren	Ralf Törngren (1899–1961)	9 July 1953	5 May 1954	300 days	RKP	Kekkonen IV; Tuomioja
(17)	Urho Kekkonen	Urho Kekkonen (1900–1986)	5 May 1954	20 October 1954	168 days	Centre	Törngren
19	Johannes Virolainen	Johannes Virolainen (1914–2000)	20 October 1954	3 March 1956	1 year, 135 days	Centre	Kekkonen V
(18)	Ralf Törngren	Ralf Törngren (1899–1961)	3 March 1956	27 May 1957	1 year, 85 days	RKP	Fagerholm II
(19)	Johannes Virolainen	Johannes Virolainen (1914–2000)	27 May 1957	29 November 1957	186 days	Centre	Sukselainen I
20	Paavo Hynninen	Paavo Hynninen (1883–1960)	29 November 1957	29 August 1958	273 days	Independent	Fieandt; Kuuskoski
(19)	Johannes Virolainen	Johannes Virolainen (1914–2000)	29 August 1958	4 December 1958	97 days	Centre	Fagerholm III
21	Karl-August Fagerholm	Karl-August Fagerholm (1901–1984)	4 December 1958	13 January 1959	40 days	SDP	Fagerholm III
(18)	Ralf Törngren	Ralf Törngren (1899–1961)	13 January 1959	16 May 1961	2 years, 123 days	RKP	Sukselainen II
22	V. J. Sukselainen	V. J. Sukselainen (1906–1995); Acting	16 May 1961	19 June 1961	34 days	Centre	Sukselainen II
23	Ahti Karjalainen	Ahti Karjalainen (1923–1990)	19 June 1961	13 April 1962	298 days	Centre	Sukselainen II; Miettunen I
24	Veli Merikoski	Veli Merikoski (1905–1982)	13 April 1962	18 December 1963	1 year, 249 days	Liberals	Karjalainen I
25	Jaakko Hallama	Jaakko Hallama (1917–1996)	18 December 1963	12 September 1964	269 days	Independent	Lehto
(23)	Ahti Karjalainen	Ahti Karjalainen (1923–1990)	12 September 1964	14 May 1970	5 years, 244 days	Centre	Virolainen; Paasio I Koivisto I
26	Väinö Leskinen	Väinö Leskinen (1917–1972)	14 May 1970	29 October 1971	1 year, 168 days	Independent	Aura I Karjalainen II
27	Olavi J. Mattila	Olavi J. Mattila (1918–2013)	29 October 1971	23 February 1972	117 days	Independent	Aura II
28	Kalevi Sorsa	Kalevi Sorsa (1930–2004)	23 February 1972	4 September 1972	194 days	SDP	Paasio II
(23)	Ahti Karjalainen	Ahti Karjalainen (1923–1990)	4 September 1972	13 June 1975	2 years, 282 days	Centre	Sorsa I
(27)	Olavi J. Mattila	Olavi J. Mattila (1918–2013)	13 June 1975	30 November 1975	170 days	Independent	Liinamaa
(28)	Kalevi Sorsa	Kalevi Sorsa (1930–2004)	30 November 1975	29 September 1976	304 days	SDP	Miettunen II
29	Keijo Korhonen	Keijo Korhonen (1934–2022)	29 September 1976	15 May 1977	228 days	Centre	Miettunen III
30	Paavo Väyrynen	Paavo Väyrynen (born 1946)	15 May 1977	19 February 1982	4 years, 280 days	Centre	Sorsa II; Koivisto II
31	Pär Stenbäck	Pär Stenbäck (born 1941)	19 February 1982	6 May 1983	1 year, 76 days	RKP	Sorsa III
(30)	Paavo Väyrynen	Paavo Väyrynen (born 1946)	6 May 1983	30 April 1987	3 years, 359 days	Centre	Sorsa IV
(28)	Kalevi Sorsa	Kalevi Sorsa (1930–2004)	30 April 1987	31 January 1989	1 year, 276 days	SDP	Holkeri
32	Pertti Paasio	Pertti Paasio (1939–2020)	31 January 1989	26 April 1991	2 years, 85 days	SDP	Holkeri
(30)	Paavo Väyrynen	Paavo Väyrynen (born 1946)	26 April 1991	5 May 1993	2 years, 9 days	Centre	Aho
33	Heikki Haavisto	Heikki Haavisto (1935–2022)	5 May 1993	3 February 1995	1 year, 274 days	Centre	Aho
34	Paavo Rantanen	Paavo Rantanen (born 1934)	3 February 1995	13 April 1995	69 days	Independent	Aho
35	Tarja Halonen	Tarja Halonen (born 1943)	13 April 1995	25 February 2000	4 years, 318 days	SDP	Lipponen I-II
36	Erkki Tuomioja	Erkki Tuomioja (born 1946)	25 February 2000	19 April 2007	7 years, 53 days	SDP	Lipponen II; Jäätteenmakki; Vanhanen I
37	Ilkka Kanerva	Ilkka Kanerva (1948–2022)	19 April 2007	4 April 2008	351 days	National Coalition	Vanhanen II
38	Alexander Stubb	Alexander Stubb (born 1968)	4 April 2008	22 June 2011	3 years, 79 days	National Coalition	Vanhanen II; Kiviniemi
(36)	Erkki Tuomioja	Erkki Tuomioja (born 1946)	22 June 2011	29 May 2015	3 years, 341 days	SDP	Katainen; Stubb
39	Timo Soini	Timo Soini (born 1962)	29 May 2015	6 June 2019	4 years, 8 days	Finns	Sipilä
40	Pekka Haavisto	Pekka Haavisto (born 1958)	6 June 2019	20 June 2023	4 years, 14 days	Green	Rinne; Marin
41	Elina Valtonen	Elina Valtonen (born 1981)	20 June 2023	Incumbent	3 years, 49 days	National Coalition	Orpo

== See also ==
- Stubb cabinet
- Sipilä cabinet
- Rinne cabinet
- Marin cabinet
- Orpo cabinet
