= Jaakko Itälä =

Finnish politician (1933–2017)

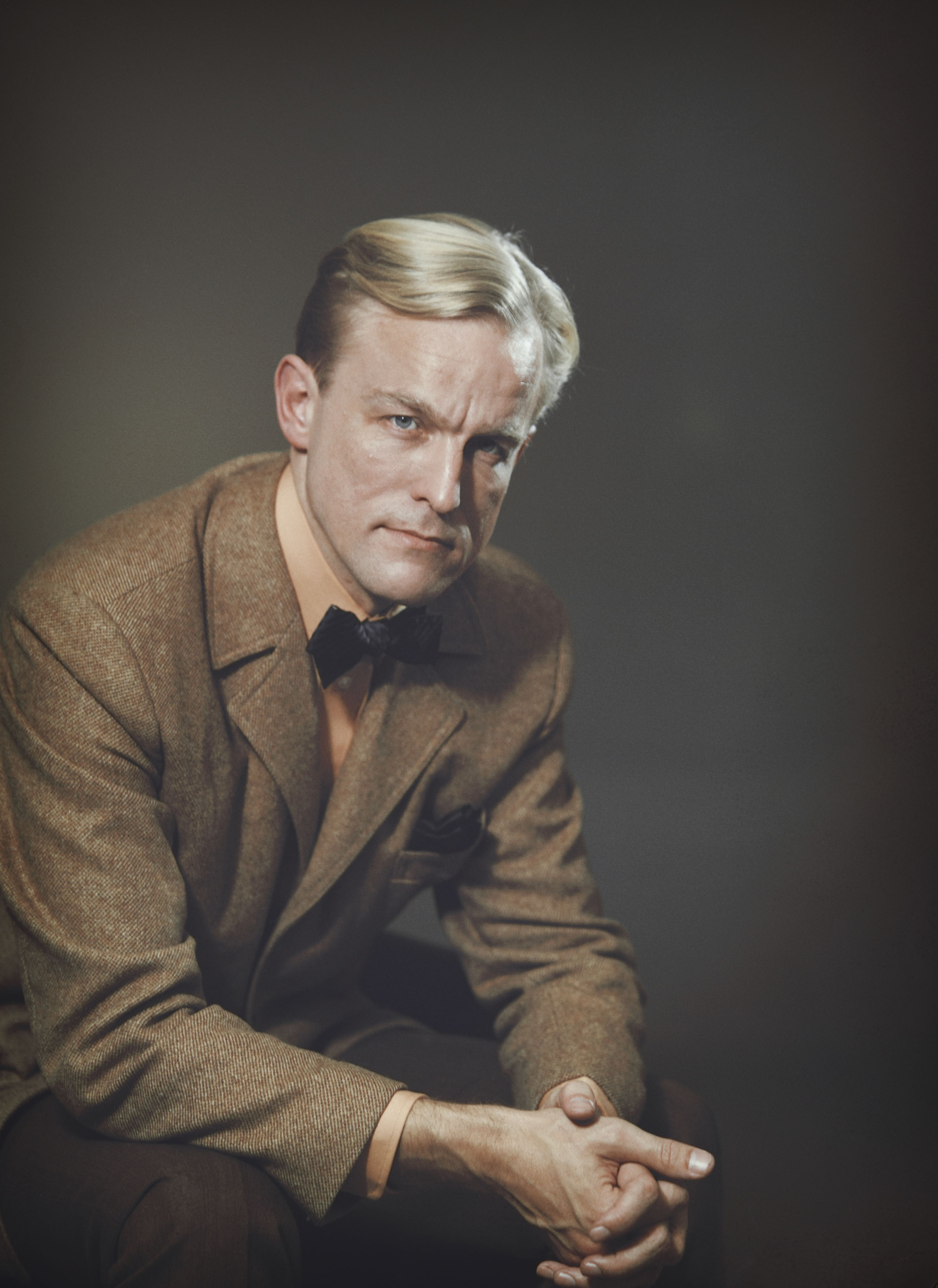

Chairman of the Liberal People's Party
- In office 1978–1982

Minister of Education
- In office 1970–1971
- In office 1978–1979

Personal details
- Born: 7 May 1933 Porvoo, Finland
- Died: 9 November 2017 (aged 84) Helsinki, Finland
- Party: Liberal People's Party
- Spouse: Helena Itälä
- Children: 2
- Education: University of Helsinki

Jaakko Itälä (1933–2017) was a Finnish politician. He served as the minister of education for two terms in the 1970s. He was also a member of the Parliament and head of the Liberal People's Party.

== Early life and education ==
Itälä was born in Porvoo on 7 May 1933. He graduated from the University of Helsinki receiving a degree in economics. During his university studies he was a contributor to the student newspaper Ylioppilaslehti.

== Career and activities ==
Following his graduation Itälä founded a middle school in Yläne and directed it. He became an advertising manager and textbook editor at the publishing house K. J. Gummerus in 1958. He continued to write articles in various publications often dealing with the education reform.

In the 1960s Itälä became the general secretary of the school reform committee which developed a model for the elementary schools and headed the committee in late 1960s. During his term he contributed to the basic education reform in Finland. In 1968 Itälä was named as executive director of the Mannerheim Children's Protection Association.

Itälä served as minister of education for two terms: from 1970 to 1971 and from 1978 to 1979. He was elected to the Parliament in 1979 obtaining the second highest vote nationwide in the elections. He served at the Parliament until 1983. He led the Liberal People's Party between 1978 and 1982.

Itälä was the secretary general of Mannerheim Children's Protection Association from 1990 to 1997.

== Personal life and death ==
He married Helena Itälä, a psychologist, in 1956. They had two children. He died at the age of 84 in Helsinki on 9 November 2017.

=== Honors ===
Itälä was named an honorary doctor by the University of Helsinki's Faculty of Philosophy in 1990.
