= Onni Hiltunen =

Finnish politician

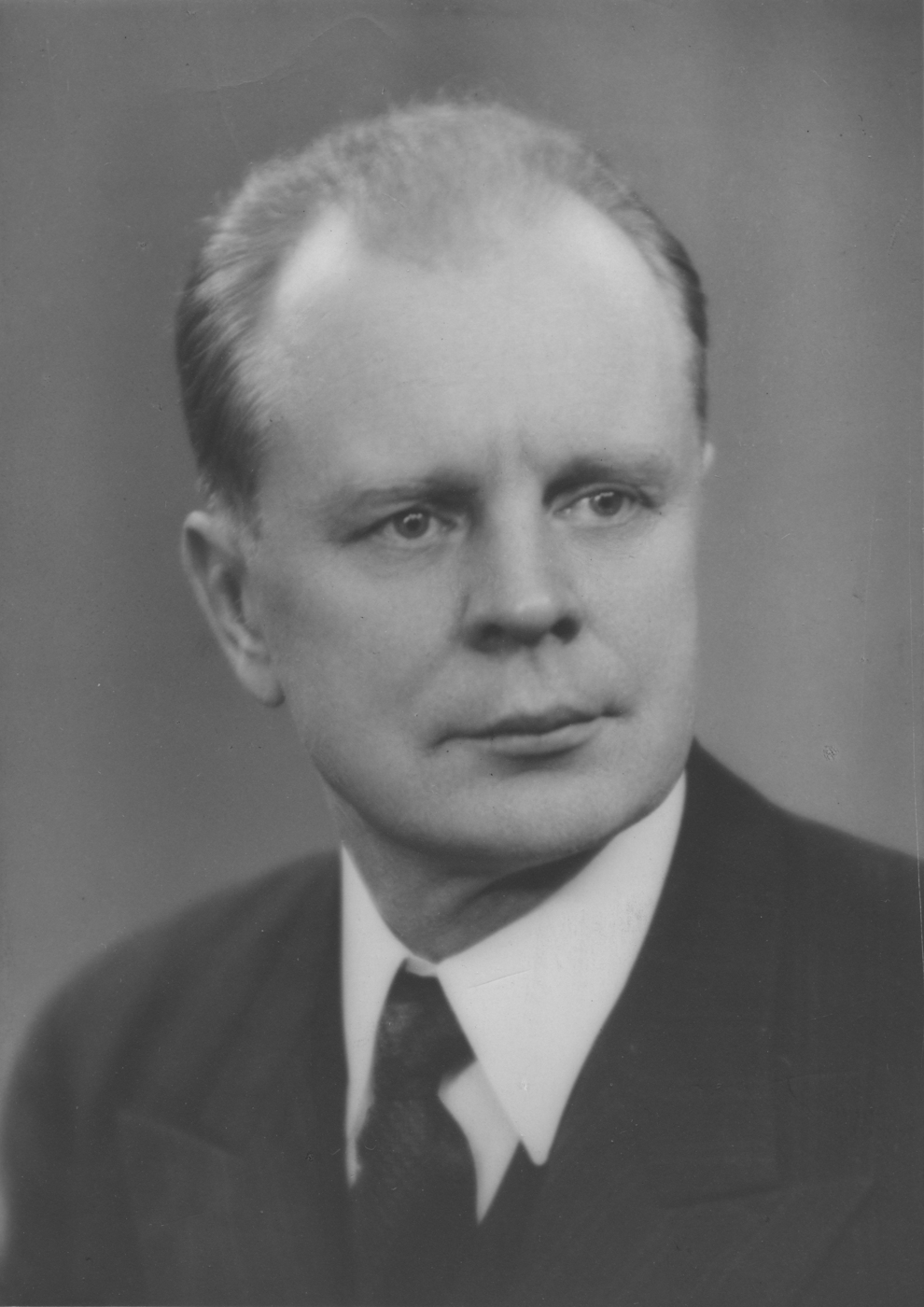

Deputy Prime Minister of Finland
- In office 4 December 1958 – 13 January 1959
- Prime Minister: Karl-August Fagerholm
- Preceded by: Johannes Virolainen
- Succeeded by: Ralf Törngren

Minister of Trade and Industry
- In office 29 August 1958 – 13 January 1959
- Prime Minister: Karl-August Fagerholm
- Preceded by: Lauri Kivekäs
- Succeeded by: Ahti Karjalainen

Minister of Finance
- In office 17 January 1951 – 20 September 1951
- Prime Minister: Urho Kekkonen
- Preceded by: V. J. Sukselainen
- Succeeded by: Viljo Rantala
- In office 29 July 1948 – 17 March 1950
- Prime Minister: Karl-August Fagerholm
- Preceded by: Ralf Törngren
- Succeeded by: V. J. Sukselainen
- In office 8 August 1944 – 17 November 1944
- Prime Minister: Antti Hackzell; Urho Castrén
- Preceded by: Väinö Tanner
- Succeeded by: Johan Helo

Member of the Finnish Parliament
- In office 21 October 1930 – 19 February 1962
- Constituency: Northern Savonia

Personal details
- Born: Onni Alfred Hiitunen; 26 November 1895 Jyväskylä, Finland
- Died: 8 June 1971 (aged 75) Varkaus, Finland
- Party: Social Democratic

Onni Alfred Hiltunen (26 November 1895 – 8 June 1971) was a Finnish politician, minister in several cabinets and chairman of the Social Democratic Party.

Hiltunen was born in Jyväskylä. He worked as railwayman and was later a shopkeeper. He worked at a social democratic paper in Varkaus 1931–1946. Hiltunen was elected to the parliament for terms between 1930 and 1962 first from Northern and later from Southern Savonia electoral district.

Hiltunen was chairman of the Social Democratic Party between 1944 and 1946. He held several ministerial posts, including Minister of Finance 1944, 1948–1950, 1951, Minister of Trade and Industry and Deputy Prime Minister 1958–1959, Minister of Finance 1945–1946, 1946–1948.

He was chairman of KELA 1951–1961.
