= Ahti Karjalainen =

Finnish politician (1923–1990)

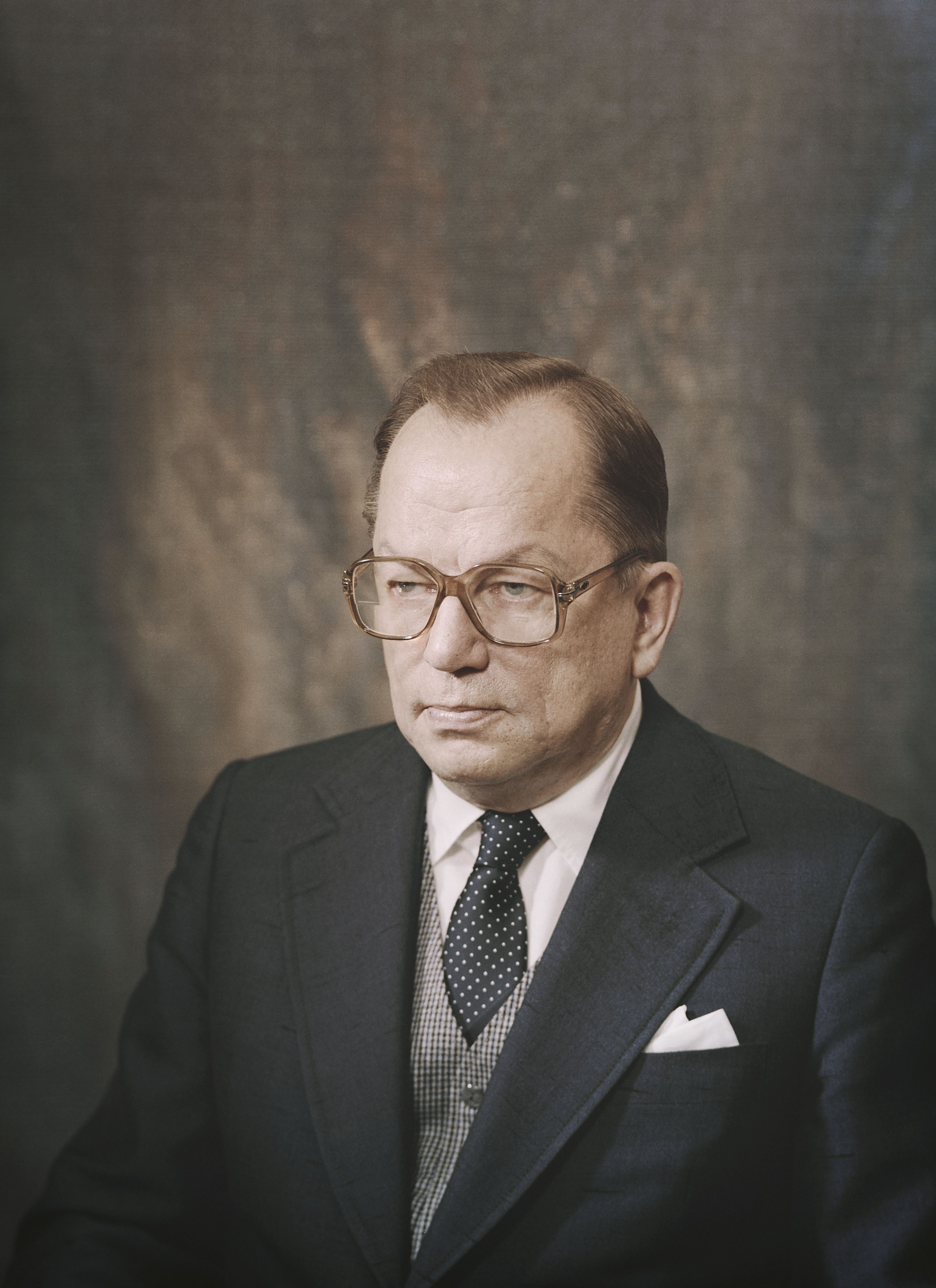
- Karjalainen in 1980

28th Prime Minister of Finland
- In office 15 July 1970 – 29 October 1971
- President: Urho Kekkonen
- Deputy: Veikko Helle
- Preceded by: Teuvo Aura
- Succeeded by: Teuvo Aura
- In office 13 April 1962 – 18 December 1963
- President: Urho Kekkonen
- Deputy: Johannes Virolainen
- Preceded by: Martti Miettunen
- Succeeded by: Reino R. Lehto

Minister of Foreign Affairs
- In office 4 September 1972 – 13 June 1975
- Prime Minister: Kalevi Sorsa
- Preceded by: Kalevi Sorsa
- Succeeded by: Olavi J. Mattila
- In office 12 September 1964 – 14 May 1970
- Prime Minister: Johannes Virolainen; Rafael Paasio; Mauno Koivisto
- Preceded by: Jaakko Hallama
- Succeeded by: Väinö Leskinen
- In office 19 June 1961 – 13 April 1962
- Prime Minister: V. J. Sukselainen; Martti Miettunen
- Preceded by: Ralf Törngren
- Succeeded by: Veli Merikoski

Minister of Trade and Industry
- In office 13 January 1959 – 19 June 1961
- Prime Minister: V. J. Sukselainen
- Preceded by: Onni Hiltunen
- Succeeded by: Björn Westerlund

Deputy Prime Minister of Finland
- In office 29 September 1976 – 15 May 1977
- Prime Minister: Martti Miettunen
- Preceded by: Kalevi Sorsa
- Succeeded by: Johannes Virolainen
- In office 4 September 1972 – 13 June 1975
- Prime Minister: Kalevi Sorsa
- Preceded by: Mauno Koivisto
- Succeeded by: Olavi J. Mattila
- In office 12 September 1964 – 26 May 1966
- Prime Minister: Johannes Virolainen
- Preceded by: Reino Oittinen
- Succeeded by: Reino Oittinen

Member of the Finnish Parliament
- In office 5 April 1966 – 23 March 1979
- Constituency: Mikkeli

Personal details
- Born: Ahti Kalle Samuli Karjalainen; 10 February 1923 Hirvensalmi, Finland
- Died: 7 September 1990 (aged 67) Helsinki, Finland
- Party: Agrarian League/Centre Party (resigned in 1983)
- Spouse: Päivi Koskinen
- Children: 4
- Education: University of Helsinki

Ahti Kalle Samuli Karjalainen (10 February 1923 – 7 September 1990) was a Finnish economist and politician. He was a member of the Agrarian League (later known as Keskusta, Centre Party) and served two terms as Prime Minister of Finland. He is, however, better known for his period as Minister of Foreign Affairs of Finland. Karjalainen is considered one of the most influential figures in post-war Finnish politics.

Like President Urho Kekkonen, whom he served as private secretary from 1950, Karjalainen attached great importance to Finland's relationship with the Soviet Union. The two men remained close political allies for more than two decades, and by the 1960s and early 1970s Karjalainen was widely seen as Kekkonen's likely successor as president. Their relationship deteriorated in the early 1970s, and Karjalainen never attained the presidency, in part as alcoholism affected his later career. Alongside politics, he also built a parallel career at the Bank of Finland, ultimately serving as its governor from 1982 to 1983.

== Early life and education ==
Karjalainen was born in Hirvensalmi as the youngest of four children. His father was farmer Anselm Karjalainen (1875–1943) and his mother was Anna Lyydia Viherlehto (1880–1962). He studied at the lukio in Mikkeli from 1935 until 1939, then was drafted into the army in the Winter War, serving in a radio reconnaissance unit. After the Winter War ended, Karjalainen briefly continued his education at the Lutheran folk high school in Tuusula, but once the Continuation War broke out, he returned to his old radio reconnaissance unit, serving at listening stations in Petrozavodsk (Äänislinna) and Medvezhyegorsk (Karhumäki) in the Finnish-occupied Republic of Karelia. During his second stint in the army, Karjalainen also attended the Reserve Officer School in Niinisalo and was promoted to the reserves with the rank of captain.

In 1944, after being discharged, Karjalainen entered the University of Helsinki, where he obtained his bachelor's degree in political science in 1946. He subsequently obtained his licentiate degree in 1958 and defended his doctorate in political science at the same university in 1959. His dissertation was titled "The relationships between the monetary politics of the Bank of Finland and the state economy from 1811 to 1953 mainly regarding liquidity analysis".

== Political career ==
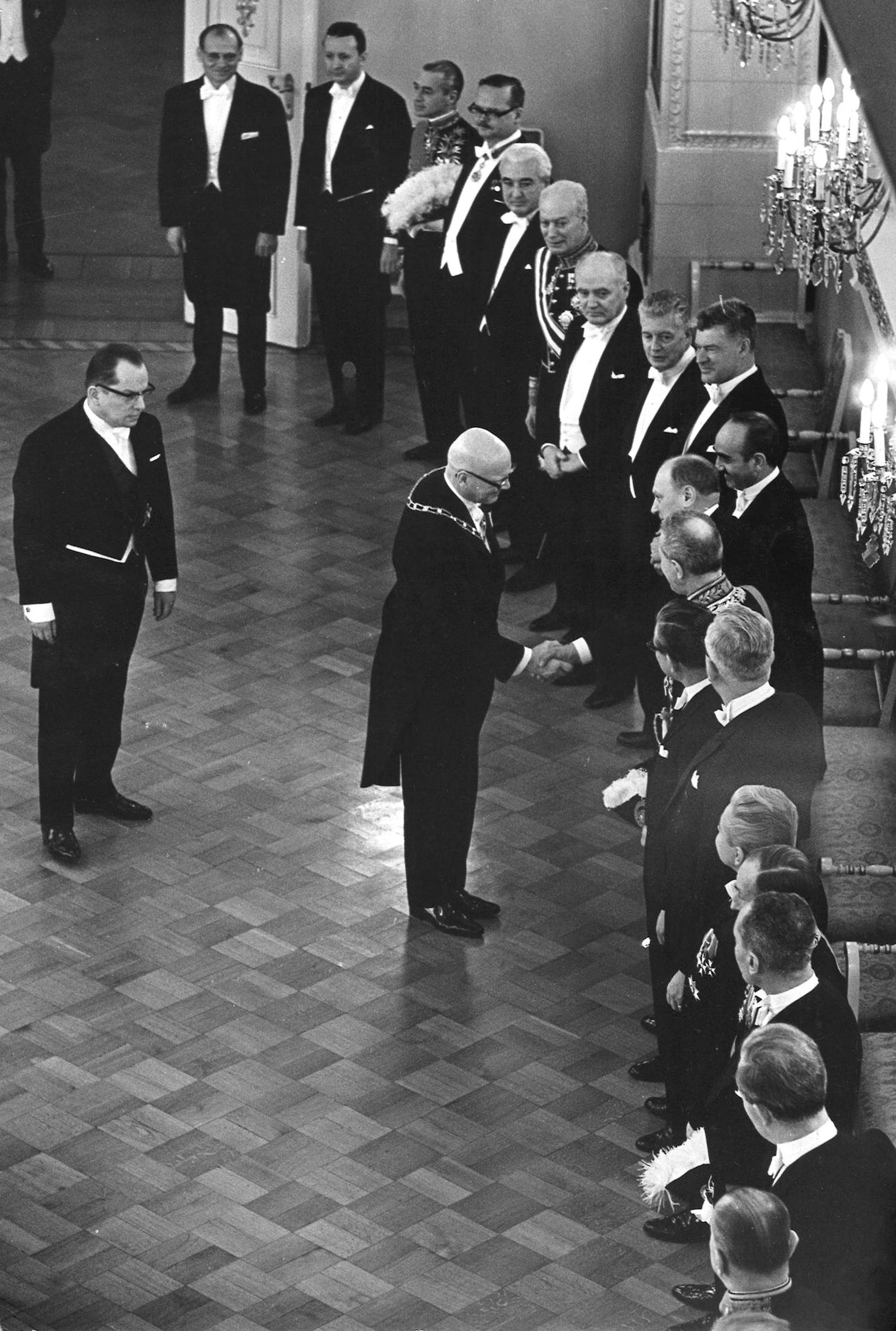
Inauguration ceremony for the Urho Kekkonen presidency in 1968. Here the President meets the representants of diplomats. Behind him, the minister Ahti Karjalainen

=== Night Frost Crisis and the EFTA negotiations ===
During the so-called Night Frost Crisis of 1958, Karjalainen's personal contacts with Soviet representatives continued to function even as official relations were frozen, and several messages from the Kremlin to Kekkonen were relayed through him. He was appointed Minister of Trade and Industry in January 1959, working chiefly to safeguard Finland's position within the Western European economic sphere. Together with Kekkonen, Karjalainen led the negotiations that allowed Finland, despite Soviet opposition, to join the European Free Trade Association (EFTA) in 1961 as an associate member, through the so-called FINEFTA agreement. In a secret letter, Karjalainen committed Finland to extending all of its EFTA benefits to the Soviet Union, which reinforced Soviet interest in keeping both Karjalainen and Kekkonen in power.

=== Government minister and prime minister ===
Karjalainen served as the Minister of the Treasury, Minister of Foreign Affairs and Minister of Trade and Industry for half a decade from 1957. Kekkonen's re-election in the 1962 presidential election was far from certain: the opposition had put forward Olavi Honka as a rival candidate in 1961. Kekkonen had already planned in April 1961 to dissolve parliament in order to weaken the alliance behind Honka, and in late October the Soviet Union sent a note invoking Article 2 of the 1948 YYA Treaty's provisions on the threat of war — the so-called Note Crisis. Support for Honka's candidacy weakened as a result, and he withdrew in November. The crisis was defused partly through the channels to Moscow that Karjalainen commanded, and following Kekkonen's re-election Karjalainen formed his first government on 13 April 1962. It remained in office until 18 December 1963. Ministers from the Social Democratic Union of Workers and Smallholders (TPSL), representing the SAK trade union confederation, left the government in October 1963, and the cabinet was finally brought down that December after Karjalainen's own coalition partners rejected a budget stabilisation programme he had proposed.

Karjalainen's second government, formed on 15 July 1970, came about only after considerable pressure from the Soviet Union. Negotiations to renew the Finno-Soviet Treaty of Friendship, Cooperation, and Mutual Assistance (the YYA Treaty) were underway that year, and Moscow made a majority government in Finland a precondition for renewal; despite his by-then strained relationship with Karjalainen, Kekkonen was compelled to accept a new government under his leadership. The government's central achievement was the December 1970 incomes agreement, known as the UKK Agreement after Kekkonen's initials, reached after the president personally mediated between labour and employers. Although opposed by the Finnish People's Democratic League, part of the governing coalition, the agreement passed in parliament, prompting the Communist ministers to leave the government in March 1971. During this period Karjalainen was also instrumental in establishing the Fund for Regional Development (Kehitysaluerahasto Oy), which came to play a significant role in supporting Finland's underdeveloped regions and whose creation is largely credited to him personally. Karjalainen served as prime minister until 29 October 1971, when disagreements between the Centre Party and the Social Democrats over economic policy led Kekkonen to dissolve the government and call a snap election. According to Sorsa's biographer, however, Kekkonen's decisive motive was to close off Karjalainen's path to the presidency, a goal Kalevi Sorsa himself actively supported.

Following a caretaker government under Teuvo Aura and a Social Democratic minority government under Rafael Paasio, which took office on 23 February 1972, a majority government under Kalevi Sorsa — comprising the SDP, the Centre Party, the Swedish People's Party and the Liberal People's Party — was formed on 4 September 1972, with Karjalainen returning as Minister of Foreign Affairs. The government fell on 13 June 1975, when Kekkonen appointed a caretaker government under Keijo Liinamaa.

Karjalainen's ministerial career continued with only short interruptions until May 1977. By this time he had spent 5,772 days as a political minister - a period of service only surpassed by Johannes Virolainen. Karjalainen first entered the Parliament of Finland in 1966, serving as a member for 13 years.

=== Relationship with Kekkonen ===
Karjalainen's appointment as Kekkonen's private secretary in 1950 marked the beginning of their long political partnership. In the late 1960s their relationship was also strained by the Nordek project, a proposed Nordic economic union championed by Prime Minister Mauno Koivisto that ultimately foundered on differing national interests and left Koivisto's relations with both Kekkonen and Foreign Minister Karjalainen "strongly strained". The relationship between Kekkonen and Karjalainen soured decisively in 1971, when Kekkonen dismissed Karjalainen's second government, ending two decades of close cooperation. According to one interpretation, Kekkonen's own concern that the Soviet-friendly Karjalainen would succeed him with Moscow's backing was a driving factor behind the 1973 exceptional law that extended Kekkonen's own presidential term and thereby postponed the next scheduled election.

=== 1981 presidential candidacy ===
In 1981 Karjalainen put his name forward to be presidential candidate of the Centre Party, but lost to Johannes Virolainen. The election was ultimately won by Mauno Koivisto who became President of Finland in January 1982, succeeding Kekkonen.

=== Bank of Finland ===
Outside politics, Karjalainen had a successful career with the Bank of Finland. He served as director of its research facility from 1953 to 1957, and was elected to its Board of Management in 1958. He unsuccessfully contested the governorship against Mauno Koivisto in 1968, and served as Deputy Governor of the Bank of Finland from 1979, acting chairman of the board from 1979 to 1982 and finally as governor from 1982 to 1983, after Koivisto's own election as president. He also served as chairman of the Finnish-Soviet Economic Cooperation Commission (fi:Suomalais-neuvostoliittolainen taloudellinen yhteistyökomissio) from 1967 until 1983.

== Post-politics ==
The later stages of Karjalainen's career, after he left government office in 1977, were increasingly affected by his alcoholism. In 1979 he was arrested for drunk-driving, and in 1981 he was involved in an alcohol-fuelled incident at a reception marking the anniversary of the signing of the Finno-Soviet Treaty of 1948. His alcoholism ultimately cost him his remaining public offices: in 1983 he was dismissed as Governor of the Bank of Finland and as chairman of the Finnish-Soviet Economic Cooperation Commission. Karjalainen's use of alcoholic beverages and the peculiar manner in which he spoke the English language led him to receive the moniker of "Tankero"; "Tankero jokes" ended up becoming a widely known part of Finnish culture.

The Centre Party's treatment of Karjalainen during this decline left a lasting mark: when it later offered him honorary membership in 1986, he refused to accept the title on the basis of the treatment he had previously received.

Karjalainen revisited this period of his career in 1989, when he published, with the assistance of Jukka Tarkka, memoirs in which he publicly claimed that Paavo Väyrynen had worked with the support of the Soviet Union – naming in particular Ministerial Adviser and KGB spy Viktor Vladimirov – to improve Karjalainen's chances in the 1982 presidential elections. This led to a request for clarification to the Parliamentary Constitutional Affairs Committee, led by Kimmo Sasi, a Member of Parliament, to examine the legality of Väyrynen's activities. However, the Constitutional Affairs Committee did not consider Väyrynen to have violated the Ministerial Accountability Act and the matter therefore lapsed.

== Personal life ==
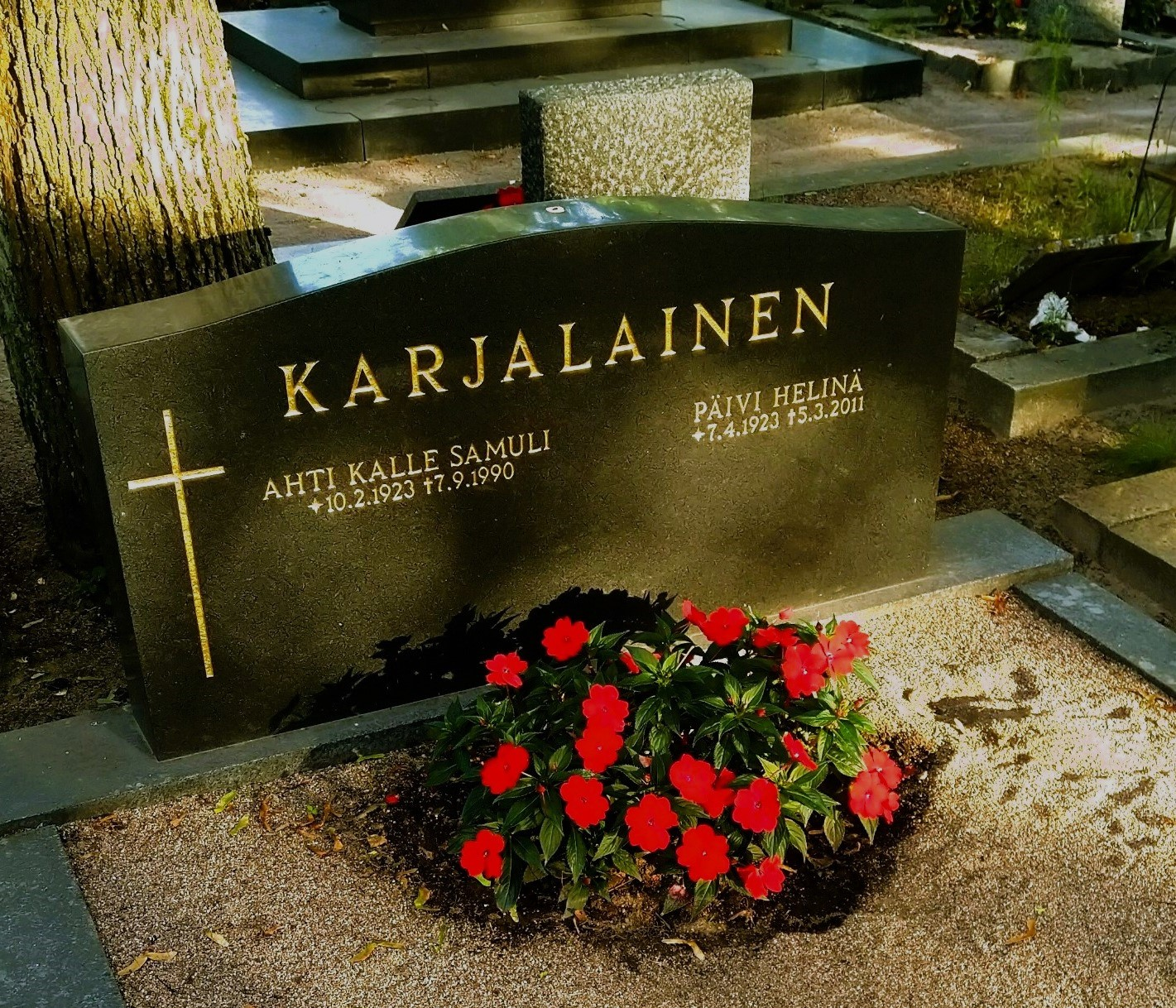
Ahti Karjalainen's grave

Karjalainen married Päivi Koskinen in 1947. They had four children; their third child, Kukka-Maaria Karjalainen (born 1952), is an author and a political scientist.

In his final years, Karjalainen died of pancreatic cancer at the Riistavuori retirement home in Helsinki on 7 September 1990. He is buried in Hietaniemi Cemetery.

== Works ==
- Doctoral dissertation on Bank of Finland monetary policy and Finnish state finances, 1811–1953 (1959)
- Minun näkökulmastani. Vuosikymmen ulko-, kauppa- ja talouspolitiikkaa (1970)
- Mukana Suomessa (1976)
- Kotimaani ompi Suomi. Mietteitä ja muistelmia (1981)
- Presidentin ministeri. Ahti Karjalaisen ura Urho Kekkosen Suomessa (with J. Tarkka, 1989)

A posthumous, diary-based volume, Aikoja ja tapauksia Ahti Karjalaisen elämästä, was published in 1997. In 1998, Karjalainen's daughter, Kukka-Maaria Karjalainen, published Isä ("Father"), a well-received portrait of her father and his career, which was adapted for the stage and premiered at the Helsinki City Theatre in 2001.

== Honours and awards ==
US Senator Hubert Humphrey and Ahti Karjalainen in Helsinki (1969).

=== National honours ===
- Grand Cross of the Order of the White Rose of Finland
- Commander of the Order of the Lion of Finland

=== Foreign honours ===
- (Norway) Grand Cross of the Order of St. Olav (1961)
- (Iceland) Grand Cross of the Order of the Falcon (1967)
- (Czechoslovakia) Grand Cross of the Order of the White Lion (1969)
- (United Kingdom) Knight Grand Cross of the Order of St Michael and St George (1969)
- (Spain) Grand Cross of the Order of Isabella the Catholic (1975)
- (Belgium) Grand Cross of the Order of the Crown
- (Holy See) Knight Grand Cross of the Order of Pope Pius IX
- Order of the Flag of the People's Republic of Hungary, 1st Class
- (Mexico) Grand Cross of the Order of the Aztec Eagle
- (Netherlands) Knight Grand Cross of the Order of Orange-Nassau
- (Poland) Grand Cross of the Order of Polonia Restituta
- (Romania) Order of Tudor Vladimirescu, 1st Class
- (Sweden) Commander Grand Cross of the Order of the Polar Star
- (Tunisia) Grand Cordon of the Order of Independence
- (Tunisia) Grand Cordon of the Order of the Republic

== Cabinets ==
- Karjalainen I Cabinet
- Karjalainen II Cabinet

Political offices
Preceded by Martti Miettunen	Prime Ministers of Finland; 1962–1963	Succeeded by Reino Ragnar Lehto
Preceded by Teuvo Aura	Prime Ministers of Finland; 1970–1971	Succeeded by Teuvo Aura
Government offices
Preceded by Mauno Koivisto	Governor of the Bank of Finland; 1982-1983	Succeeded by Rolf Kullberg
