= Grels Teir =

Finnish lawyer and politician

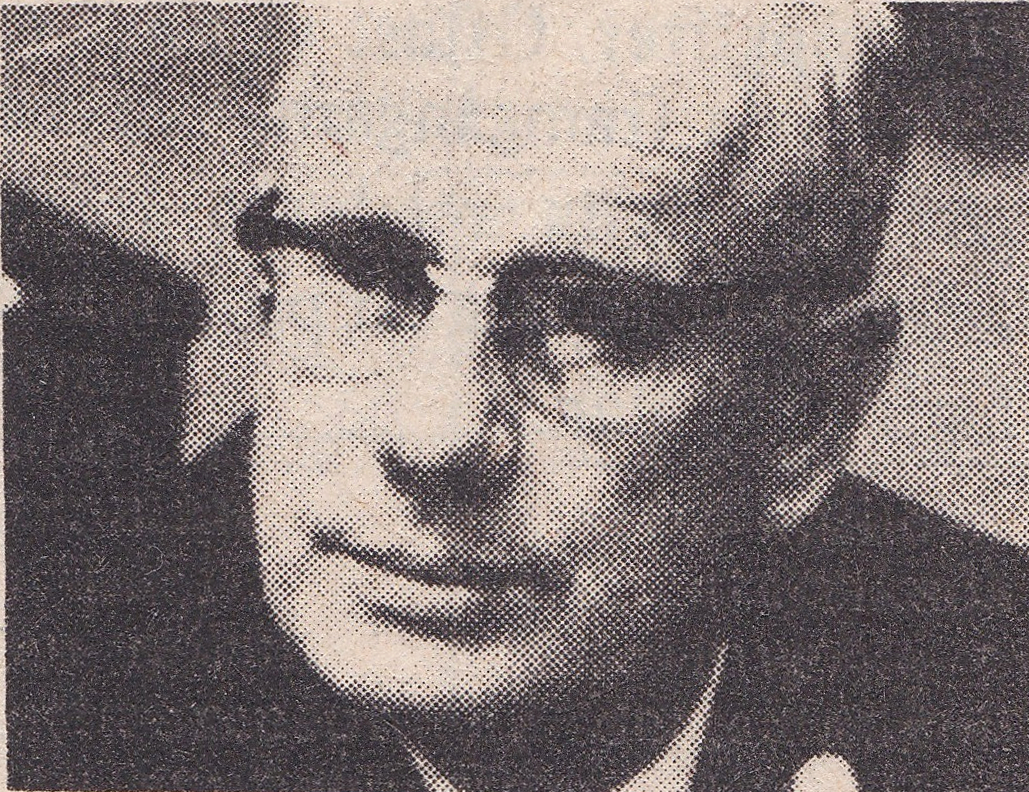

Minister of Transport and Public Works
- In office 12 September 1964 – 27 May 1966

Minister of Trade and Industry
- In office 22 March 1968 – 14 May 1970
- In office 4 September 1972 – 31 December 1972

Deputy Minister of Social Affairs and Health
- In office 13 June 1975 – 30 November 1975

Personal details
- Born: 26 February 1916; Lappfjärd
- Died: 23 June 1999 (aged 83)
- Political party: Swedish People's Party of Finland

Grels Olof Teir (26 February 1916, Lappfjärd – 23 June 1999) was a Finnish lawyer and politician. He served as Minister of Transport and Public Works from 12 September 1964 to 27 May 1966, Minister of Trade and Industry from 22 March 1968 to 14 May 1970 and again from 4 September to 31 December 1972, and Deputy Minister of Social Affairs and Health from 13 June to 30 November 1975.

He was a member of the Parliament of Finland from 1951 to 1975, representing the Swedish People's Party of Finland (SFP).
