= Uuno Takki =

Finnish politician

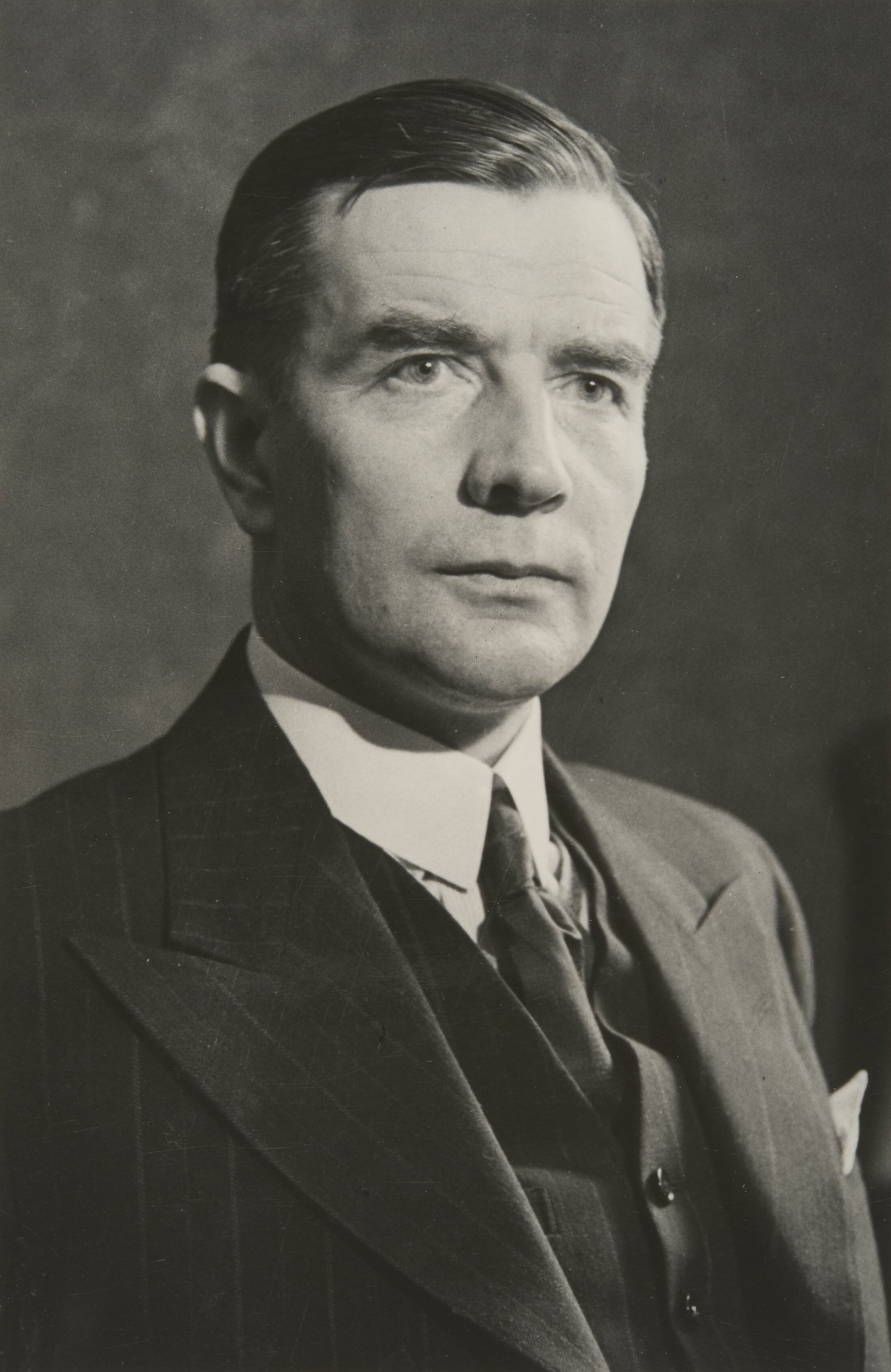
Uuno Takki

Uuno Kristian Takki (12 April 1901, in Kotka – 15 September 1968) was a Finnish lawyer, cooperative manager and politician. He served as Minister of Trade and Industry from 22 May 1942 to 17 November 1944 and again from 26 March 1946 to 17 March 1950, Minister of Education from 17 November 1944 to 17 April 1945, Deputy Minister of People's Service from 17 April 1945 to 29 July 1948, Deputy Minister of Trade and Industry from 15 June 1945 to 26 March 1946 and Deputy Minister for Foreign Affairs from 27 March 1946 to 17 March 1950. He was a member of the Parliament of Finland from 1945 to 1952 and again from 1966 until his death in 1968, representing the Social Democratic Party of Finland (SDP). He was the mayor of Lahti from 1938 to 1942.
