= Socialism in Finland =

Socialism in Finland dates back to the latter half of the 19th century in the Grand Duchy of Finland, with the political radicalisation of the labour movement due to increasing industrialisation and urbanisation.

== History ==
=== Wrightian era ===
The labour movement began with the establishment of workers' associations in the late 19th century. The first workers' association was the Helsinki Workers' Association, founded by Viktor Julius von Wright in 1883, which did not originally hold socialist beliefs. Many workers' associations were founded by members of the bourgeoisie, and these associations supported the Wrightian labour movement, which was a socially liberal movement that sought to advance liberal interests, such as universal suffrage, alongside cooperation with the feminist and temperance movements.

The founder of this labour movement was Viktor Julius von Wright, an industrialist from Helsinki, who had grown worried by the rise of socialism during his visit to Germany and Denmark, and thus sought to curb the rise of socialism in Finland by preventing the radicalization of the working class. He thought that by promoting workers' position through cooperation with employers and by addressing some of the problems caused by industrialisation, while keeping control of the movement in the hands of the upper-class. Danish Arbejderforeningen af 1860 and German State Socialism were the primary inspirations behind the labour movement.

The labour movement had grown rapidly by the end of the 1880s, with most large towns having workers’ associations, and by the mid-1890s, most small industrial towns had them too. Membership, however, was not as widespread and altogether the labour movement had mobilized fewer than 5,000 people. Most of the members of the Wrightian labour movement were middle-class, specifically small-business owners, foremen and craftsmen, and members of the intelligentsia outnumbered workers.

During the 1880s-1890s, working-class newspapers and magazines were founded. Papers such as Arbetaren–Työmies, Työmies, Länsisuomen Työmies or Kansan Lehti, a paper later headed by Yrjö Mäkelin, routinely published articles about European socialists and their methods, such as strikes. There was a struggle between the newspapers over which would be the definitive newspaper of the labour movement, with Kansan Lehti being less focused on class struggle and more focused on the language strife, which was criticised by the head of Työmies as 'nationalist revisionism'. Exposure to socialist influence, combined with the movement's increasing control by the working-class, resulted in the Second Workers' Association Assembly held in Tampere in 1896, at which more socialist ideals were adopted.

The Helsinki Workers' Association was also affected by this drift towards socialism, and thus Viktor Julius von Wright gave up leadership of the movement in 1896, but remained a member of the board of the Helsinki Workers' Association. Between 1896-1898, many advocates of the Fennoman movement and Intelligentsia left the organization, such as Atte Tarjanne, the chairman of the Young Finnish Party. The Young Finns had been at the helm of the Wrightian labour movement between 1897-1898, and would later continue to maintain connections through Yrjö Mäkelin.

Another significant step towards political independence was taken in the lead-up to the elections for the Diet of 1899. The First Russification Period (1899–1905) had begun, and the bourgeoisie in particular wanted to present a unified front, while the radical wing of the labour movement sought to abstain from the elections entirely, a protest against the delays encountered by the new suffrage act.. The radical wing won the debate in the movement, causing Viktor Julius von Wright to leave entirely, giving up his membership on the board of the Helsinki Workers' Association. The Finnish Labour Party was founded in the aftermath of this final internal divide between the working-class and the bourgeoisie.

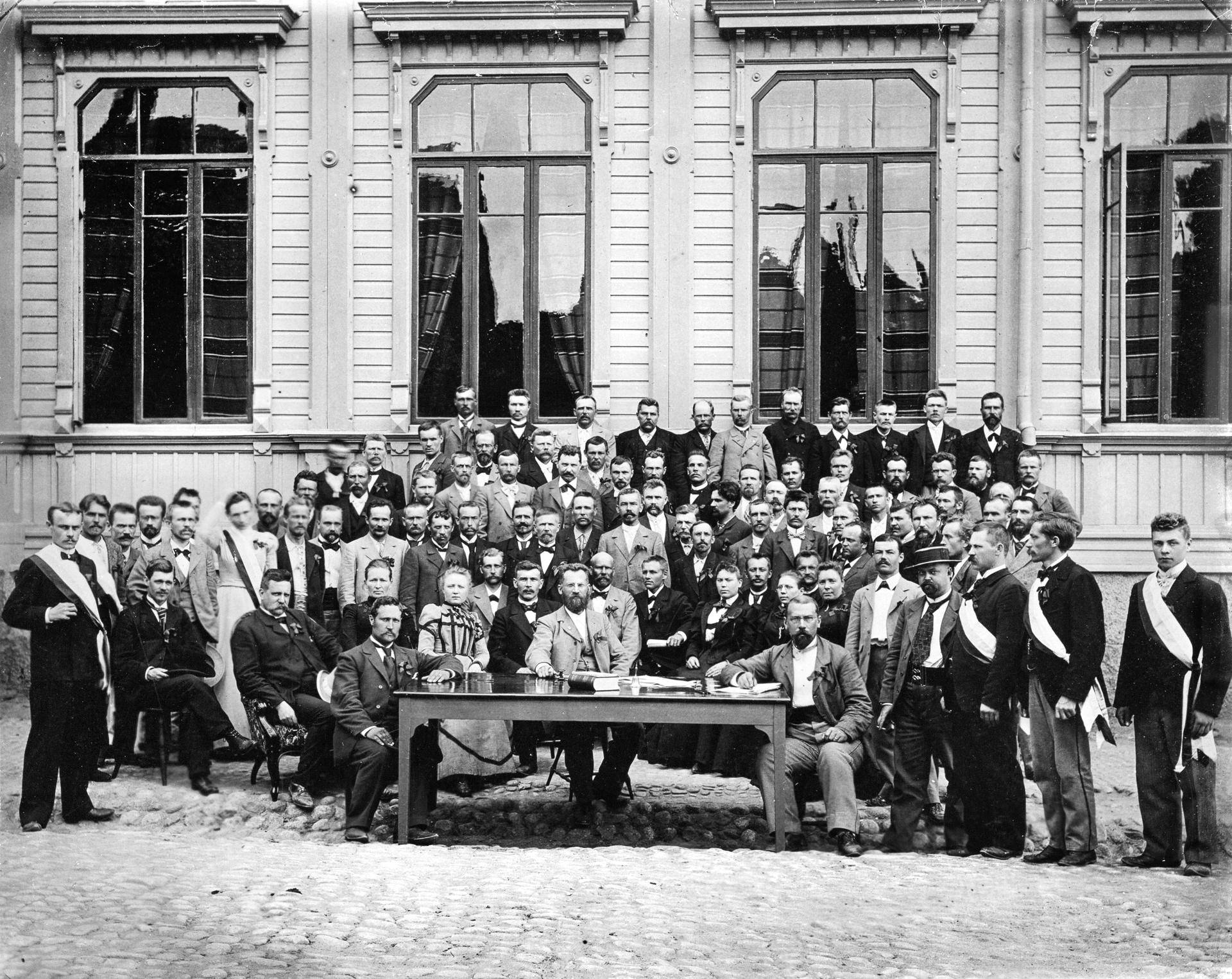
The founding congress of Social Democratic Party of Finland, Turku, July 1899.

The Finnish Labour Party was founded based on the principles of the mainstream labour movement of the day. The Labour Party adopted the following program as immediate and necessary goals of the movement, with later goals to be debated:

- General, equal, and direct voting rights for all Finnish citizens aged 21 and over, regardless of gender, in all elections and votes. Proportional representation system. Two-year legislative terms. Elections and votes to be held on a legally designated rest day.
- Legislation and the right of self-taxation for the people through the Parliament.
- Complete freedom of association, assembly, expression, and press.
- Working hours to be reduced to 8 hours. The maximum working hours and minimum hourly wage for state and municipal work to be implemented immediately.
- General compulsory education. Free education in all institutions. Primary school to be organized as the foundational school for all higher institutions.
- The military burden to be greatly reduced, and the idea of peace to be developed and practically implemented.
- Complete equality between men and women.
- A general prohibition law on the production and sale of alcoholic beverages to be enacted.
- Labour protection legislation to be developed. The number of labor inspectors to be significantly increased, and assistants from the working class to be appointed for them. Female inspectors to be appointed as well.
- Gradually increasing income and inheritance taxes. Elimination of all indirect taxes.
- Workers' insurance to be taken under state care.
- Free legal proceedings and free medical assistance.
- The position of movable population tenants and smallholders to be improved.

=== 1905 General Strike ===
==== Background ====
Due to the attempted Russification of Finland (1899–1905), the Russian defeat in the Russo-Japanese War and growing class consciousness amongst Finns, the labour movement began to grow in popularity. The Social Democratic Party grew rapidly in popularity and was allowed to operate publicly, unlike socialists in Russia. All camps of the political spectrum grew to disdain the Russian Governorship, especially the nationalists, leading to the assassination of Nikolai Bobrikov by Eugen Schauman. In August, a large number of workers and students began to demand universal voting rights.

==== General Strike ====
On 20 October, a railway strike began in St. Petersburg, Russia, spreading to the rest of the country, with Finnish railway workers in St. Petersburg joining the strike on 29 October. On 29 October, workers and constitutionalists, mainly consisting of the aristocracy and the bourgeoisie, began to demand the resignation of the Old Finnish Party government. On 30 October, the Old Finnish Party-dominated Senate held a vote of no confidence and requested its resignation, which was accepted by the Tsar.

On 30 October, a general strike was proclaimed in Helsinki's Senate Square and Railway Square and also in Tampere's Keskustori by workers, who were later joined by students. The strike began with the railway workers and spread from there. The strike paralysed the nation, with most schools, factories, shops and offices were closed, and the strike soon spread to Viipuri, Turku and Oulu.

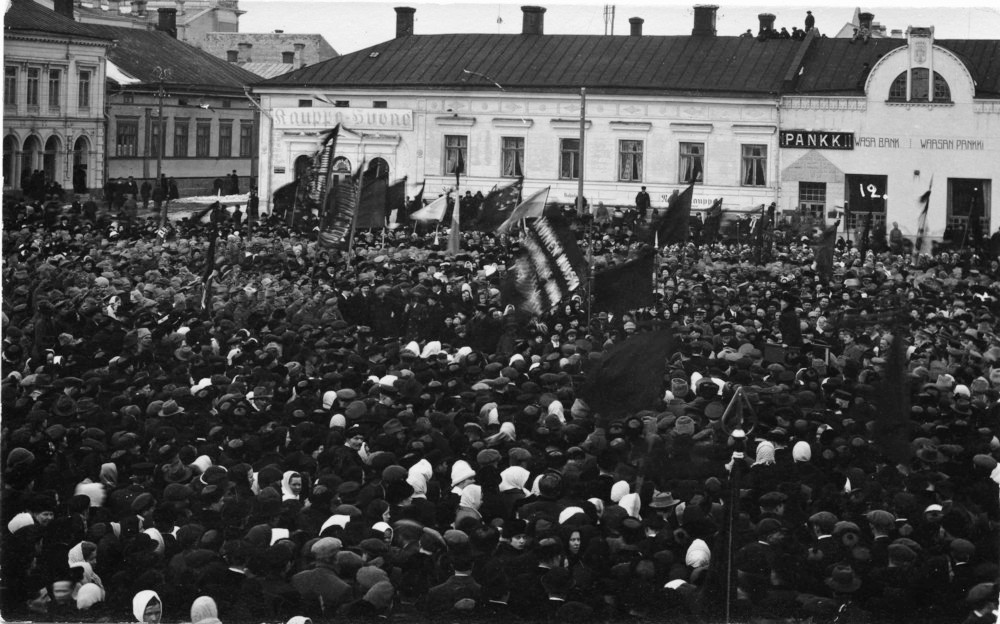
General strike meeting in Pori, Finland, October 1905.

The goal of the socialist movement had originally been more moderate, a simple protest against the Russian Governorship. However, the general strike had moved the Social Democrats towards the left with the influx of new people sympathetic to the cause, leaving the moderates and unionists in the minority. Workers' strike committees were established in Tampere, and across many cities "street parliaments" became a common occurrence. All of this was much too radical for many Young Finns and Svecomen. The demands of the Social Democrats had changed, and their new demands, such as a unicameral parliament and equal voting rights for all citizens, were too radical for some. Particularly to the Young Finns and to the Finland-Swedes, characterised as the most conservative of the radicals, and thus they began to detach themselves from the movement.

National Guards were created in 1905 as a united front of workers and students against the Russian Governorship. However, due to the increasing radicalisation of the labour movement, the National Guards split, eventually resulting in the creation of the respective Red Guards and White Guards in Finland. The Red and White Guards were dissolved following the end of the general strike, and would not officially return until the Finnish Civil War.

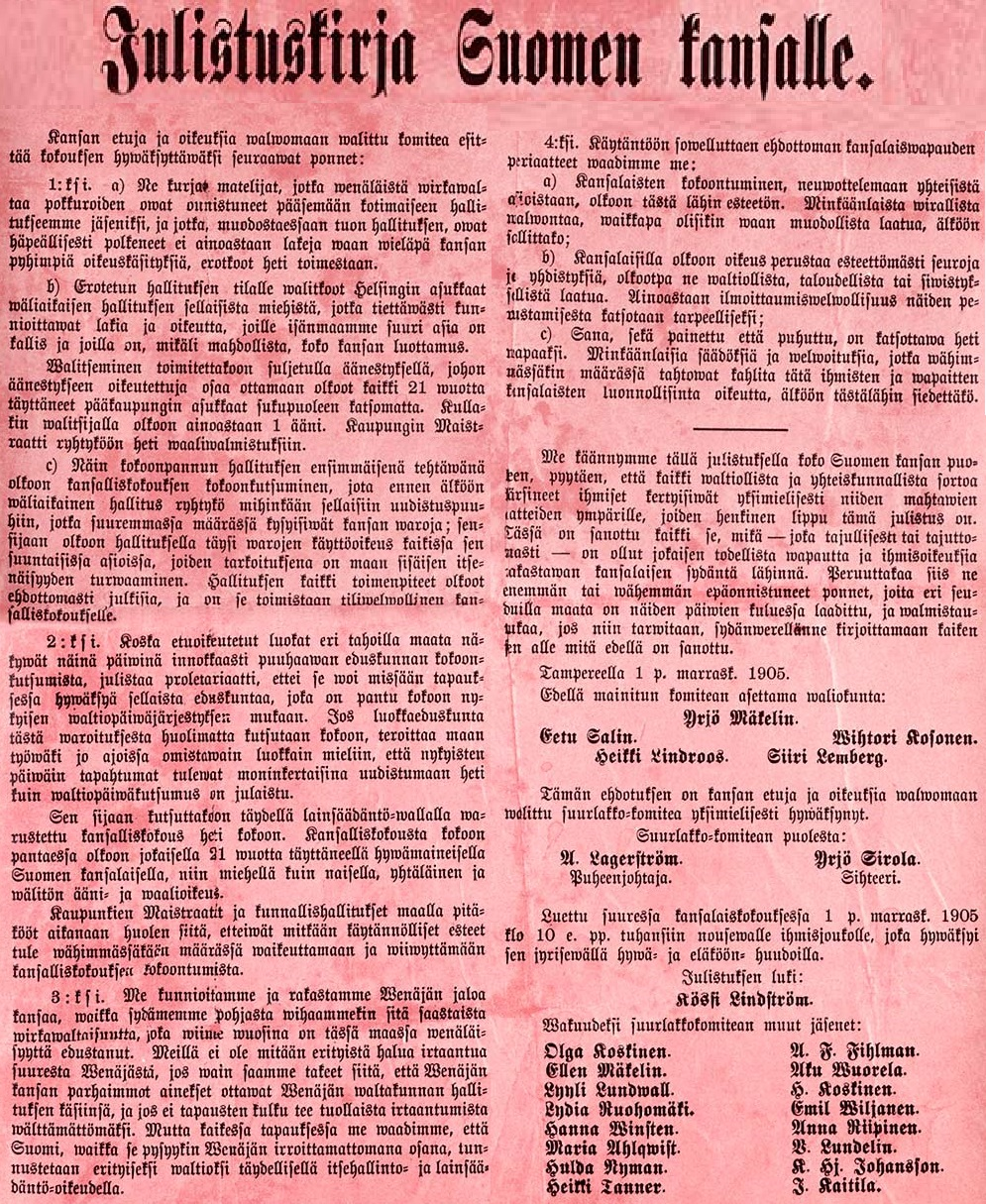
Red Declaration of Tampere (1905).

On 1 November, the Red Declaration was issued in Keskustori, Tampere. The declaration demanded equal voting rights for all citizens, and the disestablishment of the Senate, to be replaced by a National Parliament. These demands were later sent to Helsinki on 4 November, at which point they were accepted. On November 4 in Rautatientori, Helsinki, a provisional government was elected as required by the Red Declaration.

=== Following the Independence of Finland ===
==== The Civil War ====
On 29 January 1918, Red Guards and radicals in the Social Democratic Party succeeded in a plot of occupying the Senate House in Helsinki. A Red Government, called the Finnish Socialist Workers' Republic, would be declared. The Government would be a socialist state, and the Eduskunta (Parliament) would be replaced by the Central Workers' Council, which supervised the Finnish People's Delegation (Government). The Central Workers' Council would be composed of forty delegates, 15 of whom represented the Social Democrats, 10 represented the Finnish Trade Union Federation and Red Guards each, and 5 represented the Helsinki Workers' Council.

The Red Guards would serve as the official military for the state, and would fight the Whites during the Civil War. Around 100,000 people would come to serve in the Red Guard, of which 2,000 were members of the Women's Red Guards. The Constitution for the Red Government was based on the United States and Swiss Constitution and took ideas from the French Revolution. The Red Government would silence criticism by banning anti-communist newspapers such as Det Vita Finland and Valkoinen Suomi.

The Red Government would capitulate on 5 May 1918 during the Battle of Ahvenkoski. Following the capitulation of the Red Government, several prominent socialists would flee Finland to Soviet Russia in fears of persecution, where some of them, such as Edvard Gylling, would establish the Karelian Labor Commune. During the Civil War, the Red Guards had committed atrocities known as the Red Terror, where political violence was carried out through executions. Toijala and Kouvola were the centers of terror, where 300–350 Whites were executed between February and April 1918. Around ten priests and ninety moderate socialists were executed by the Red Guards. Sometimes landowners, police officers, industrialists, civil servants and teachers were also executed by the Red Guards.

==== Interwar Era ====
In 1918, Communists organized the Communist Party of Finland (SKP) in Moscow. The SKP was banned in Finland for having tried to topple the government and was therefore made illegal to be a part of. Regardless, the SKP still operated underground in Finland, primarily using front organizations, such as the Socialist Workers' Party of Finland (1920–1923) and the Socialist Electoral Organization of Workers and Smallholders (1924–1930). These front organizations were used for organizing events at workplaces and public places, where illegal revolutionary socialist material would be read. The Etsivä keskuspoliisi would strictly monitor communists, and would break up meetings, sending communists to prison for treason either at Tammisaari or Hämeenlinna.

The SKP was a member of the Communist International and its policies were one-to-one with it. Communist organizations would be officially banned throughout the 1930s with the Communist laws. In the Soviet Union, with Stalin's Great Purge, the influence of the SKP was significantly limited, as leaders and members of the Communist Party were executed/killed.

During the Great Depression, around 12,000-15,000 Finns emigrated to the Soviet Union, however as Finland recovered and upon reports of migrants being arrested, executed or sent to labour camps under Stalin's Great Purge, around one tenth returned home. During the 1930 parliamentary election, the Social Democrats grew in popularity, largely due to the barring of communists from elections, however the Great Depression was not favourable to socialist movements, instead being favourable to the right-wing. Väinö Tanner had secured his leadership in the 1930 party congress and had begun moderating the party after having gained the trust of the party's left-wing, to be able to cooperate with the political center.

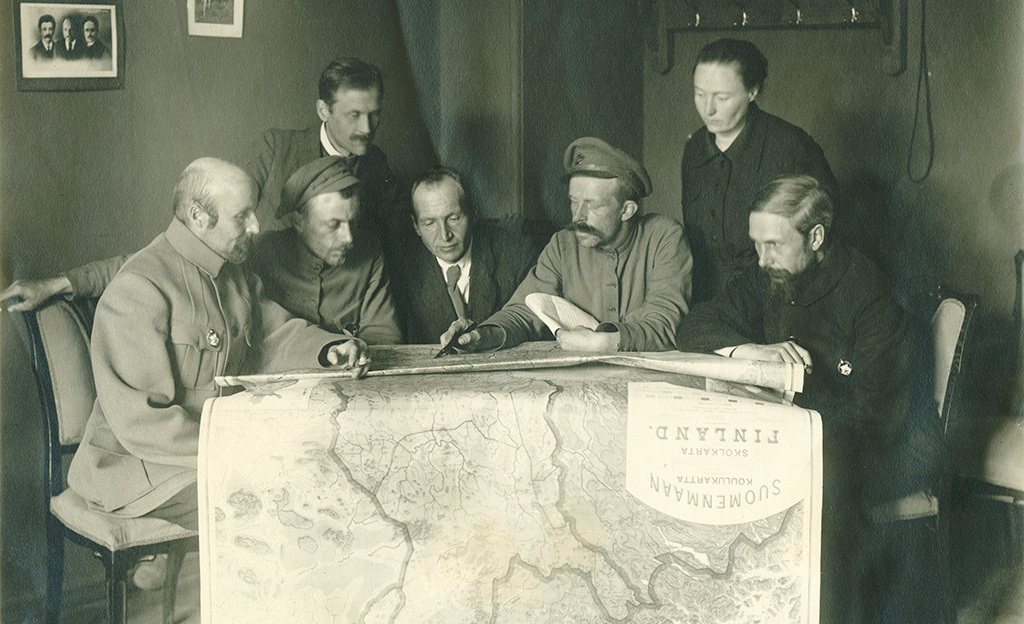
Central Committee of the Finnish Communist Party in Moscow

==== Wartime and Socialism ====
During the Winter War against the Soviet Union, socialists would cooperate with non-socialists, because they saw Finnish independence as more important. This led to the rise and creation of organizations such as the Union of Finnish Brothers-In-Arms, which were organizations also made as a counter-balance against the Finland–Soviet Union Peace and Friendship Society, a Soviet-backed anti-war propaganda organization.

Following the Winter War, sympathizers to the Soviet Union were removed from the Social Democratic Party. These sympathizers became known as the "six", and they set up their own faction within parliament known as the 'Socialist parliamentary group'. The Continuation War, was a controversial topic within many mainstream parties, and it was opposed by many socialists, who viewed it as a war of aggression and saw it as unjustifiable for the Finns to be allied with Nazi Germany. This sentiment only grew as the war lengthened, turned to a stalemate in East Karelia, and worsened Finnish living standards, leading to the formation of the Peace opposition.

During the Continuation War, communists would attempt to organize a resistance movement in Finland to end the war with the Soviet Union. Infrastructure sabotage and espionage for the Soviet Union was the main method of resistance. Soldiers who refused to enter service and fight in East Karelia against the Soviet Union became known as the Metsäkaarti (Forest Guard). Olavi Laiho, who led the Forest Guards in Turku, was a communist that spied for the Soviet Union, and also the last Finn to be executed. During the Continuation War and the Lapland War, there were 32,186 deserters, of which a large amount were communists, or at least anti-fascists, mostly refusing service due to Finland's Brothers-in-Arms policy with Nazi Germany. In Hämeenkyrö, Kittilä and Kolari were the largest concentrations of deserters or Forest Guards, there were an approximate 100 Forest Guards, which represented around one tenth of the reservists in the municipality. In Tampere, a socialist youth resistance movement would oppose the war by performing domestic terrorism against trains and public infrastructure.

=== Cold War ===
==== Social Democrats ====
The Social Democratic Party during the 1950s and 1960s was at fray with the Soviet Union and its Eastern Bloc, due to its party election of 1957 choosing Väinö Tanner to its leadership, who was a convicted war criminal. This alongside other 'mishaps' by the Social Democrats led to the Night Frost Crisis, which led to crisis within the Social Democrats due to the Soviet Union not accepting the authority of their government. The Social Democrats began to skew their foreign policy to be more favourable to the Eastern Bloc and the USSR, in hopes of warming relations with the Soviet Union. The Social Democrats, from the 1950s to the 1960s would cooperate with the National Coalition Party, this phenomenon would be called the Aseveliakseli, or the Brothers-in-Arms Axis. In 1961, the Social Democrats alongside most other parties in Parliament, would form a united front against Urho Kekkonen, to prevent his reelection, this was called the Honka Front, named after Olavi Honka, however Honka gave up on his election campaign against Kekkonen due to the Note Crisis.

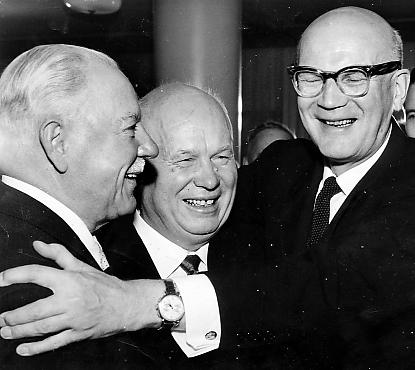
Kliment Voroshilov, Nikita Khrushchev, and Urho Kekkonen in November 1960.

The Social Democratic Party faced a split in the late 1950s, due to the election of Väinö Tanner. This alongside the feuds of Väinö Leskinen and Aarre Simonen with Emil Skog, who had been the previous leader of the Social Democrats for over ten years and who was criticized for moving increasing right, led to the creation of the Social Democratic Union of Workers and Smallholders (TPSL), a rival social democratic political party which was increasingly more conservative and Pro-Kekkonen. The TPSL continued to operate as a separate political party, holding seats in the Eduskunta, losing all their held seats in the 1970 Finnish parliamentary election, when they only received 1.7% of the national vote, and finally being dissolved in 1972. The party split also caused the disintegration of the trade unionist movement, leading to the cementation of two 'rival' trade unions, that believed in two different variations of social democracy, the Finnish Federation of Trade Unions (SAK) and the Finnish Trade Union Federation (SAJ), which united to form the Central Organization of Finnish Trade Unions in 1969.

==== Finnish People's Democratic League ====
The Finnish People's Democratic League (SKDL) was founded as a big tent socialist political party after the Continuation War in 1944, when communism had been relegalised as per the stipulations of the Moscow Armistice. The communists held the most influence and sway within the party, as they made up the majority after the most influential socialists had either died or left the party. However, there was a variety in communism, and this was a major reason for not outright merging with the Communist Party of Finland (SKP), who was Marxist-Leninist, and a merger with whom, would've lead to fears of authoritarianism. Despite the opposition to a merger, the two operated together and the SKP held much influence over the SKDL, with the SKP participating in elections on the list of the SKDL. Communist-dominance lead to the establishment of the Socialist Unity Party in 1946 by former members of the Social Democrats, functioning as a party within a party, however dissolving in 1955.

The People's Democratic League got second place in the 1945 Finnish parliamentary election, with 23.47% of the vote, despite this the party would only get to lead the government from 1946 to 1948 under the Pekkala cabinet. Under the SKDL-lead Pekkala cabinet, the government notably established a child benefit system and pursued land reform. In the 1958 Finnish parliamentary election, under Kusti Kulo, the party received its highest vote share ever, receiving 23.16% and making it the largest party in parliament. Until 1967, socialism was never mentioned in the party program, however when non-communist Ele Alenius defeated the SKP's candidate Hertta Kuusinen in a leadership contest, this led to a divergence, as Alenius sought to promote a more democratic form of socialism, compared to the socialism promoted by the Soviet Union.

The SKDL would be a coalition member of the Paasio I cabinet, Koivisto I cabinet, Karjalainen II Cabinet, Miettunen II cabinet, Sorsa II cabinet and the Koivisto II cabinet. The party had various organisations, such as the Democratic League of Finnish Women, Socialist Student League and the Democratic Youth League of Finland, the only organization to be transferred to the Left Alliance upon dissolution. By the end of 1946, the party had 75,000 members, but membership declined thereafter, reaching 56,651 in 1975, 40,653 in 1981, and 33,425 in early 1990.

In 1990, the SKDL merged with the Democratic Alternative (DV) and the SKP, to form the Left Alliance.

==== The Communist Party in the Cold War ====
Following the Moscow Armistice's relegalisation of communism in Finland, the Communist Party of Finland (SKP) reemerged, and communists were released from prison after the Continuation War in October 1944. The Communist Party would receive financial assistance from the Soviet Union, and the Communist Party was believed to have approximately 40,000 members in the mid-1960s. The Communist Party would officially believe in Marxism–Leninism until the 1966 Party Assembly, when Aarne Saarinen began to move the party towards Eurocommunism, and would be more vigilant in resisting Soviet influence within the party.

Taisto Sinisalo was the main proponent against Eurocommunism, and sought to take a more favourable position towards the Soviet Union, than the party had taken. Taistoism, the term for the ideology of Sinisalo, was often referred to as Stalinist, and was born out of the conflict between Taisto Sinisalo and Arvo Aalto, alongside the position to take on the Prague Spring, and subsequent Warsaw Pact invasion of Czechoslovakia. The Warsaw Pact invasion of Czechoslovakia was extremely controversial, and caused a split within the party when the party officially condemned the invasion, and when the Kyminlaakso District Organization of the SKP defended the actions of the Soviet Union. Taistoism was a well-known ideology in Finland, and Sinisalo became a well-known person to the public, especially after a Helsingin Sanomat article on the movement and Kulttuuritaistolaisuus (Cultural Taistoism).

Cultural Taistoism was the phenomenon of Taistoist messaging being spread through popular culture, especially in the leftist political music movement of the 1970s in Finland. Love Records, a record company well-known for their Marxist-Leninist songs was highly influential. Love Records, alongside individual bands and musical groups such as Agit-prop and KOM-teatteri, were known across Finland. Thousands of Taistoists would be expelled from the Communist Party throughout 1985–1987, and they would organize into the Communist Party of Finland (Unity) (SKPy). In the 1988 the SKPy would face a party split, leading to the formation of the Communist Workers' Party – For Peace and Socialism, who claimed the SKPy weren't Marxist-Leninist enough. The SKPy, which rebranded itself to the Communist Party of Finland in 1994, is the successor of the Communist Party and states that they believe in Marxism-Leninism.

In 1990, The Communist Party of Finland (SKP) decided to unite with the Finnish People's Democratic League (SKDL) and Democratic Alternative (DV) to form the Left Alliance, a democratic socialist political party. This marked the end of political activity for the SKP, and the SKP declared bankruptcy in 1992 and was officially dissolved in 1996, then removed from the association register in 1999.

=== 21st century ===
In the 21st century Finnish political landscape, there are four active political parties, who are described as advocating for some form of socialism. They are the Social Democratic Party, Left Alliance, Communist Party of Finland and the Communist Workers' Party – For Peace and Socialism.

The Social Democratic Party in the 21st century has been characterized by advocacy for deficit spending to fund social programs, such as universal health care, and are explicitly social democratic. The Social Democrats are in favor of NATO membership, LGBT rights, such as same-sex adoption rights and for the establishment of an 'environmental administration'. The Party has held office three times from 1999–, which includes the Lipponen II Cabinet, Rinne Cabinet and the Marin Cabinet.

The Left Alliance, founded in 1990, is a party characterized as supporting democratic socialism and eco-socialism. They, for example, explicitly support economic democracy, a strong welfare state, universal basic income and a wealth tax, alongside cuts to the environmentally harmful subsidies. The party is explicitly pro-small business, self-employment and entrepreneurship, however seeks to primarily limit the power of concentrated capital. The party supports European Union membership, however expressed caution towards it as an instituion. The party was split on the issue of NATO membership following the 2022 Ukraine War, having previously affirmed hostility to the idea, however is now broadly unified in not wanting permanent NATO bases, troops, or any nuclear weapons stationed in Finland. The Left Alliance has never held office on its own, but has participated in four coalition governments, specifically the Lipponen I cabinet, Lipponen II cabinet, Katainen cabinet and the Marin cabinet.

== See also ==
- History of socialism
- Far-right politics in Finland
