= Taistoism =

1970s–1980s Finnish pro-Soviet tendency

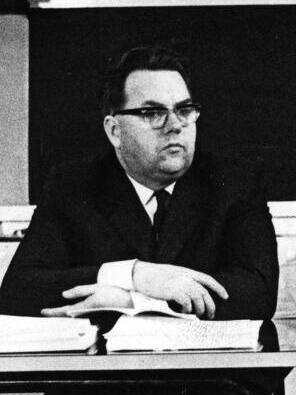
Taisto Sinisalo in 1970

Taistoism (Finnish: taistolaisuus) was an orthodox pro-Soviet tendency in the mostly Eurocommunist Finnish communist movement in the 1970s and 1980s. The Taistoists were an interior opposition group in the Communist Party of Finland. They were named after their leader Taisto Sinisalo, whose first name means "a battle", "a fight" or "a struggle". Sinisalo's supporters constituted a party within a party, but pressure from the Communist Party of the Soviet Union prevented the party from formally splitting. The term taistolaisuus was a derogatory nickname invented by Helsingin Sanomat and was never used by the group themselves. In colloquial Finnish, taistolainen is the same as Tankie in English.

Although the Taistoists were sometimes identified as "Stalinists", this was not a central part of their orthodoxy. Sinisalo himself was quite critical of Stalin, though he did credit Stalin with the establishment of socialism in the USSR. The opposition was expelled from the party 1985–1986 and it formed the Communist Party of Finland (Unity), which took the name "Communist Party of Finland" after the original party's bankruptcy in 1992. Some of the former Taistoists later joined the Left Alliance or have since abandoned Communism altogether.

== Notable former Taistoists ==
=== Members of Parliament ===
- Markus Kainulainen (1975–1979)
- Lauri Kantola (1962–1975)
- Mikko Kuoppa (1979–1987, 1995–2011)
- Ensio Laine (1968–1995)
- Pentti Liedes (1954–1966, 1970–1983, 1983–1985)
- Marja-Liisa Löyttyjärvi (1979–1991)
- Pauli Puhakka (1954–1983)
- Irma Rosnell (1954–1987)
- Taisto Sinisalo (1962–1979)
- Marjatta Stenius-Kaukonen (1975–1994, 1999–2003)
- Oili Suomi (1970–1972, 1977–1979)
- Sten Söderström (1979–1987)
- Esko-Juhani Tennilä (1975–2011)
- Seppo Toiviainen (1979–1987)
- Mirjam Tuominen (1970–1979)
- Pentti Tiusanen (1995–2011)
- Pirkko Turpeinen (1983–1987)
- Rainer Virtanen (1954–1972)

=== Cultural movement ===
- Kaj Chydenius
- Kristiina Halkola
- Heikki Kinnunen
- Kaisa Korhonen
- Marja-Leena Mikkola
- Aulikki Oksanen
- Pirkko Saisio

=== Socialist student movement ===
- Yrjö Hakanen, chairman
- Satu Hassi, member

=== Journalists ===
- Urho Jokinen, Tiedonantaja chief editor 1969–1984
- Jaakko Laakso, Tiedonantaja chief editor 1976–1991
- Leif Salmén
- Erkki Susi, Tiedonantaja editor 1971–1984, chief editor 1984–?
- Esko-Juhani Tennilä
- Nils Torvalds, Arbetartidningen Enhet editor

=== Other Members ===
- Ilkka Kylävaara
- Johannes Pakaslahti
- Veikko Porkkala
- Rauno Setälä
- Seppo Toiviainen
