= Communist Party of Finland (1994) =

Political party in Finland

Communist Party of Finland Suomen Kommunistinen Puolue (Finnish) Finlands kommunistiska parti (Swedish)
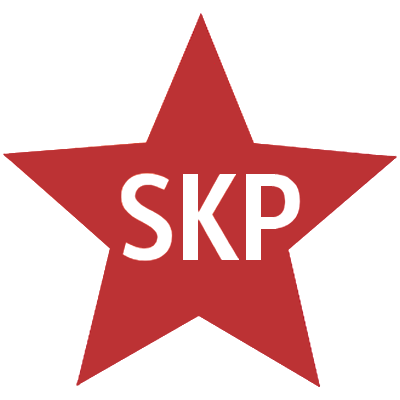
- Abbreviation: SKP
- Chairperson: Liisa Taskinen
- General Secretary: Tiina Sandberg
- Vice chair: Jiri Mäntysalo
- Founded: 1984 (SKP organizations); 1986 (SKP Unity); 1994 (new SKP)
- Registered: 1997
- Split from: Communist Party of Finland
- Headquarters: Viljatie 4 B, 00700 Helsinki
- Newspaper: Tiedonantaja
- Youth wing: Communist Youth of Finland
- Membership (2013): c. 2,000–3,000
- Ideology: Communism; Marxism-Leninism
- Political position: Far-left
- European affiliation: Party of the European Left
- International affiliation: IMCWP
- Colors: White; Red; Crimson
- Eduskunta: 0 / 200
- European Parliament: 0 / 15
- Municipalities: 0 / 8,859
- County seats: 0 / 1,379

Website
- skp.fi

The Communist Party of Finland (Finnish: Suomen Kommunistinen Puolue, abbr. SKP; Swedish: Finlands kommunistiska parti, abbr. FKP) or New Communist Party of Finland (Finnish: Uusi Suomen Kommunistinen Puolue, abbr. USKP; Swedish: Finlands nya kommunistiska parti, abbr. FNKP) is a Marxist-Leninist political party in Finland. It was founded in the mid-1980s as Communist Party of Finland (Unity) (Finnish: Suomen Kommunistinen Puolue (yhtenäisyys), abbr. SKPy; Swedish: Finlands kommunistiska parti (enhet), abbr. FKP(e)) by the former opposition of the old Communist Party of Finland (1918–1992). The SKP has never been represented in the Parliament of Finland, but the party has had local councillors in some municipalities, including the city councils of major cities such as Helsinki and Tampere. The SKP claims 2,500 members.

The party has been officially registered since 1997. In the 1980s, when the opposition and the organizations it controlled were expelled from the SKP led by Arvo Aalto, the SKPy, however, chose not to register since they considered themselves the real SKP and claimed Aalto had illegally taken control of the party. The courts later ruled all the expulsions illegal.

== History ==
=== The opposition inside SKP ===
The internal conflict of Finnish communists began in the mid-1960s, when the party led by the new chairman Aarne Saarinen, began to modernize the party line / outlook. A minority of the party cadre didn't accept this and they accused the SKP leadership of being revisionist. SKP didn't break up in the 1960s and the party was formally united until the mid-1980s. After the 20th party congress in 1984 things, however, changed as Arvo Aalto was elected chairperson, after which the opposition did not participate in (or was left out of) the SKP central committee. The opposition was also known as "the taistoists".

=== The founding of SKPy ===
The central committee of the SKP expelled eight opposition district organizations from the party 13 October 1985. Also, 494 other basic organizations and 17 city or regional organizations were expelled 13 June 1986, which the expelled then dubbed "Black Friday". The opposition considered the actions to be against the law. They took the conflict to courts and because of minor technicalities Helsingin Hovioikeus court overruled SKP's decision 11 June 1987. SKP then re-expelled these same organizations in its 21st party congress (12–14 June 1987). However, a week before this happened, the newly founded SKP (Unity) held its own "21st" party congress. The ambiguities in the expelling process and the opposition's firm belief in its own cause gave it the justification it needed and they considered SKPy to be the real SKP. They claimed Aalto had illegally seized the party with "paper members". SKPy was never taken to the official party register of Finland as the party considered that to have been voluntary resignation and admission of SKPy not being the real SKP.

On 26 April 1986, a meeting of "the representatives of SKP organizations" was held in Tampere and those present elected a new central committee. The leader of the new central committee was Taisto Sinisalo, former vice chairman of the SKP and the most well-known figure of the opposition, who already had led Committee of SKP Organizations founded in November 1985. In the SKPy's 21st party congress Sinisalo was re-elected. Yrjö Hakanen and Marja-Liisa Löyttyjärvi became the vice chairmen while the former SKP chairman Jouko Kajanoja was elected party secretary. In his congress speech, Sinisalo told that the suffix "unity" meant "strong intention to gather all the forces of the SKP". The congress, however, also was heading to future and building of a new party, or "rebuilding" as they thought it. Before the name SKPy was adopted the party was known in media as the unity or Tiedonantaja group.

=== SKP and the Soviet Union ===
SKPy was very committed to the Soviet Union and the political line of its Communist Party (CPSU), which was going through great changes during Gorbachev's time. SKPy supported perestroika but criticized those who claimed to have been "Gorbachevist" even before Gorbachev's time. SKPy claimed SKP to be anti-SU and tried to give the Finnish people as positive a picture as possible of that country. When SKP split the monetary support from Soviet Union was halted and, for example, the very profitable publishing deals of the SKP had gone to SKPy. Gorbachev's CPSU, however, had relations with both parties.

=== KTP splits from SKPy ===
In the late 1970s, the opposition of SKP began to split as those supporting a more traditional version of Marxism–Leninism began to criticize opposition leaders. When it was decided that SKPy would not be registered as an official party, some communists protested and demanded registration. They thought SKPy was clinging to the unity slogan in a situation in which it no longer seemed realistic. In the 1987 party congress, these people were warned by the SKPy leadership but they chose to ignore the advice and oriented themselves toward founding a new party. Communist Workers' Party – For Peace and Socialism (Kommunistinen Työväenpuolue – Rauhan ja Sosialismin puolesta, KTP) was founded early in the year 1988. Founders of KTP felt to be securing the existence of a Marxist-Leninist party in Finland while criticizing SKPy for being revisionist and supporting Mikhail Gorbachev. The most famous figure in the new party was probably Markus Kainulainen, a longtime SKP district secretary of Uusimaa and a former MP.

=== The founding of Left Alliance ===
Esko-Juhani Tennilä, a member of the Parliament of Finland, was elected new chairman of SKPy 22 October 1989 when Kajanoja decided to resign while strongly criticizing his comrades. Tennilä has later told he took the job to secure that the founding of a new united left party would not be sabotaged by his own party comrades many of which were quite critical of it. The Left Alliance (Vasemmistoliitto) was founded in spring 1990 and members of SKPy and its electoral front Deva also joined even though prejudices were very high on both sides at this point.

=== Dispute over double membership ===
Members of the Left Alliance (LA) disliked that many of their members were also members of the SKPy. It was thus decided that SKPy members couldn't participate in the LA's electoral lists, even though they could be members. Because of this, Tennilä also had to quit his job as party chairman when joining LA group in parliament. Yrjö Hakanen was chosen Tennilä's successor. The dispute over double membership, as it was called, led to many SKPy members leaving LA and relations between the two parties got even colder. On the other hand, many former SKPy members were actively participating in LA.

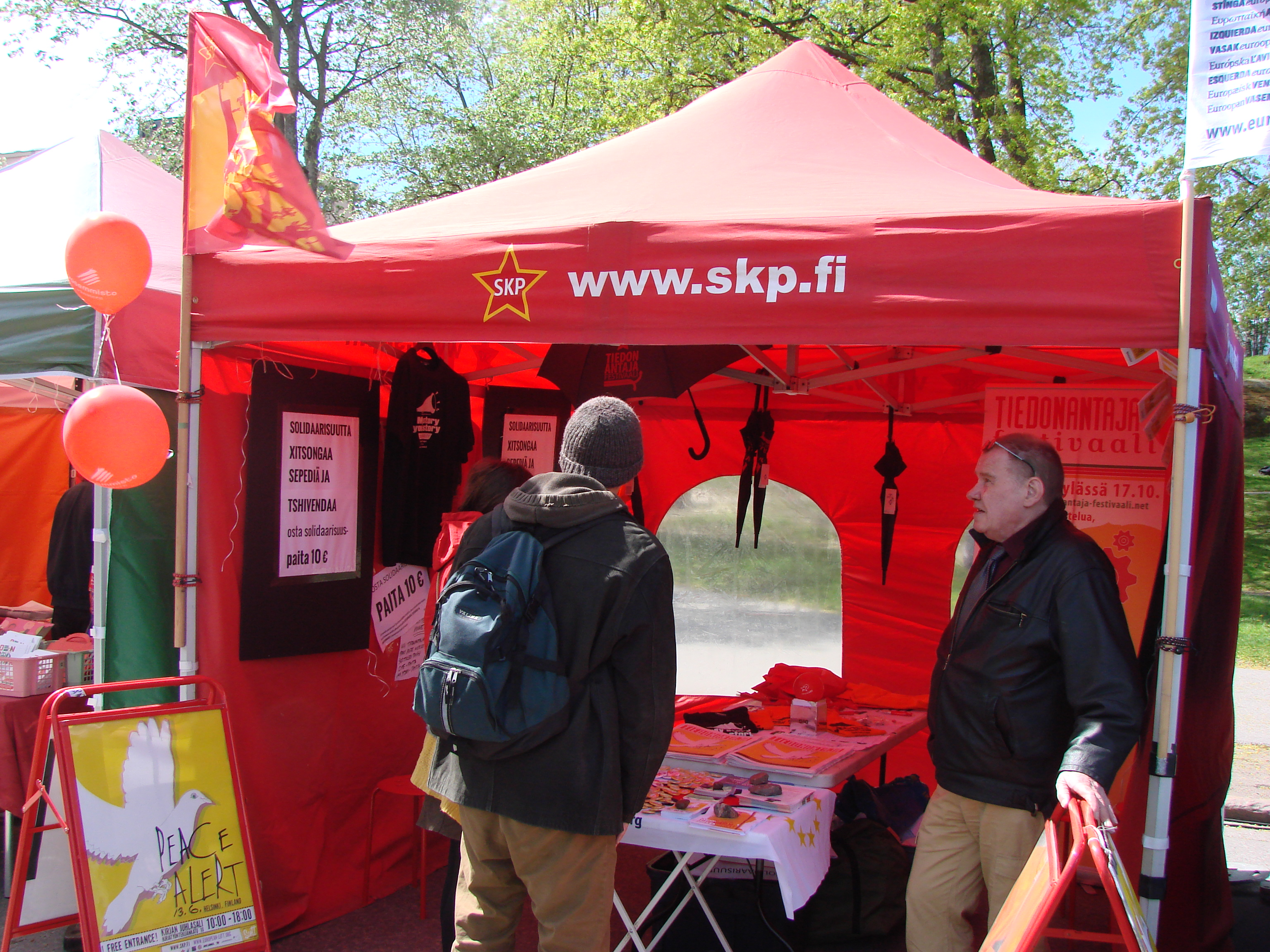
A Communist Party of Finland tent during the 2015 World Village Festival.

=== The "new" SKP ===
In its 1993 party congress (August 28–29), SKPy oriented towards founding a new officially registered communist party and drafting of a new party program. A new party logo was also introduced to mark renewal. It was suggested that a congress to continue SKP's work should be held and that happened next year (November 26–27). In the congress, the suffix "unity" was dropped from the name as SKPy now considered to consist of all those comrades who wanted to have an independent communist party. An athletic club was made the basis of new organization and renamed SKP. The decision split the party as some supporters would have preferred SKP to have a lesser role as "Marxist forum" of some kind. Leadership of Left Alliance was also not pleased with those plans. SKP would have wanted to stay inside LA but that wasn't possible and the parties split in the spring of 1994. SKP wasn't however "re-registered" until 1997. There was some confusion, as the new SKP didn't accept responsibility for debts of the old one, which had gone bankrupt.

== Organization ==
Chairpeople
1986–1988	Taisto Sinisalo
1988–1989	Jouko Kajanoja
1989–1990	Esko-Juhani Tennilä
1990–2013	Yrjö Hakanen
2013–2022	Juha-Pekka Väisänen
2022–present	Liisa Taskinen
General secretaries
1986–1988	Jouko Kajanoja
1988–1990	Yrjö Hakanen
1990–2010	Arto Viitaniemi
2010–2013	Juha-Pekka Väisänen
2013–2016	Heikki Ketoharju
2016–2018	Petra Packalén
2018–present	Tiina Sandberg
Vice chairpeople
1986–1988	Yrjö Hakanen 1. vpj.
1986–1987	Marita Virtanen 2. vpj.
1987–1989	Marja-Liisa Löyttyjärvi; 2. vpj.
1988–1989	Esko-Juhani Tennilä
1990–1991	Kristiina Nieminen
1991–?	Kirsti Kasnio
1994–2004	Riitta Tynjä
2004–2007	Kaija Kiessling
2007–2013	Lena Huldén
2013–2016	Emmi Tuomi
2013–2016	Pauli Schradrin
2016–2019	Miguel López
2016–2019	Susanna Rissanen
2019–2022	Liisa Taskinen
2020–2022	Mervi Grönfors
2022–present	Jiri Mäntysalo

SKP has a nationwide organization consisting of 14 district organizations. The central committee has 41 members and the politburo 10. The organ of SKP is Tiedonantaja, which was founded in the 1960s. Tiedonantaja was also the organ of Deva during 1986–1990. The editor-in-chief is Marko Korvela since 2012. SKP also has some local papers.

As the SKPy considered itself to be the real SKP, it also had the same organizational structure. It was based on Leninist principle of democratic centralism and the party rules of 1958 (modified in 1978).

=== Deva – SKPy's electoral front ===
While SKPy was never officially registered, its supporters founded an electoral front Democratic Alternative (Demokraattinen vaihtoehto, syllabic abbreviation: Deva). Those MPs of Finnish People's Democratic League (Suomen kansan demokraattinen liitto, abbr. SKDL, a front organization dominated by SKP) who were against expulsions were expelled from SKDL and they found the parliament group of Deva. Deva was SKPy's SKDL and it was supposed to attract some democratic allies. The small Socialist Workers Party (Sosialistinen työväenpuolue, STP) didn't join Deva but it had members on the DEVA list. Young supporters of SKPy and Deva founded Revolutionary Youth League (Vallankumouksellinen nuorisoliitto, VKN) which was Deva's youth organization. SKDL's Socialist Student League (Sosialistinen opiskelijaliitto, SOL) also joined. Deva was led by actress Kristiina Halkola.

In the 1987 parliamentary elections, Deva got 4.3% of votes and four MPs. In the 1988 presidential elections, Deva candidate Jouko Kajanoja received under 2% of the votes. Not even all members of SKPy supported Kajanoja, who was the party chairman. Deva was closed down in 1990 after Left Alliance was founded and most of its members joined the new party.

=== Party congresses ===
21st party congress of the SKP(y)	5–7.6.1987	Espoo
Party congress of the SKP(y) (party conference)	27.8–28.8.1988	Turku
Party congress of the SKP(y)	18–19.5.1991	Lahti
Party congress of the SKP(y) (party conference)	28–29.8.1993	Helsinki
Party congress for the continuation of SKP	26–27.11.1994	Helsinki
Extraordinary party congress of the SKP	31.8.1996	Helsinki
Party congress of the SKP	6–7.6.1998	Helsinki
Party congress of the SKP	19–20.5.2001	Turku
Party congress of the SKP	15–16.5.2004	Vantaa
Party congress of the SKP	9–10.6.2007	Helsinki
Party congress of the SKP	15–16.5.2010	Vantaa
Party congress of the SKP	8–9.6.2013	Vantaa
Party congress of the SKP	TBD 2016	TBD

== Elections ==
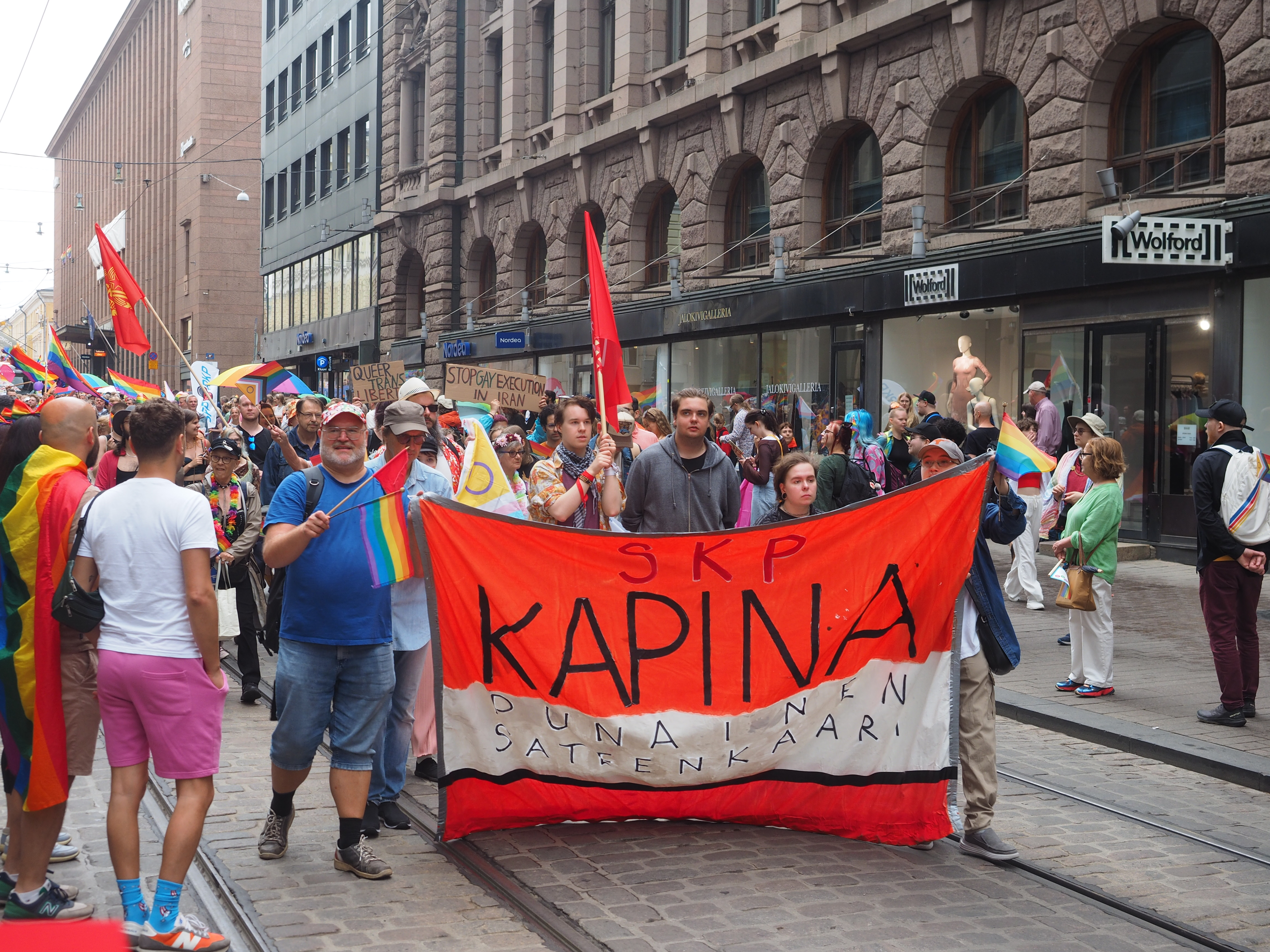
Members of the party SKP at the 2023 Helsinki Pride.

=== Electoral results ===
==== Parliament ====
Election year	# of overall votes	% of overall vote	# of overall seats won	+/-
as part of Democratic Alternative (Deva)
1987	122,181	4.2	4 / 200	new
as part of Left Alliance (Vasemmisto)
1991	274,639	10.1	19 / 200	new
1995	310,340	11.2	22 / 200	3
as Communist Party of Finland (SKP)
1999	20,442	0.8	0 / 200	new
2003	21,079	0.8	0 / 200	0
2007	18,277	0.7	0 / 200	0
2011	9,232	0.3	0 / 200	0
2015	7,529	0.3	0 / 200	0
2019	4,305	0.14	0 / 200	0
2023	3,044	0.10	0 / 200	0

==== European Parliament ====
Election year	# of overall votes	% of overall vote	# of overall seats won	+/-
as part of the Left Alliance (Vasemmisto)
1999	236,490	10.5	2 / 16	new
as Communist Party of Finland (SKP)
2004	10,134	0.6	0 / 14	new
2009	8,089	0.5	0 / 13	0
2014	5,932	0.3	0 / 13	0

Results
Municipal council
Year	Councillors	Votes	
2000	14	10,460	0.47%
2004	16	12,844	0.53%
2008	9	13,986	0.55%
2012	9	11,174	0.45%
2017	2	7,600	0.3%
2021	0	2,073	0.1%
2025	0	1,118	0.1%

The SKP participates in parliamentary, European Parliament and municipal elections. The party has not put up candidates in recent presidential elections. No national representatives has been elected from the SKP lists but the party has a few local councillors. The SKP also participates in trade union and cooperative elections.

The SKP first took part in parliamentary elections in 1999. The party had electoral alliances with small parties of Muutos 99 coalition. It was the first time the Finnish electorate had an opportunity to vote for a list named Communist Party of Finland. In 2003, the vote-puller for the party was rock musician Kari Peitsamo (1,803 votes) and in 2007 rap artist Seppo "Steen1" Lampela (1,842).

In municipal elections, the SKP has had elected councillors in a total of ten different municipalities. The party has got its strongest support in Nokia, where there are three SKP councillors. The communists also briefly had three councillors in the Jyväskylä city council until early 2008.

The SKP has made electoral coalitions with other small parties, especially the Communist Workers Party (KTP). Communist League members were on SKP lists before they in 2006 founded the Workers' Party of Finland (STP). The SKP condemned the STP for scattering communist forces. The parties have made some limited electoral cooperation since. The Left Alliance has never been interested in coalitions with the communists, although the parties have had coalitions in few municipalities.

The former SKP chairperson Yrjö Hakanen has been an elected member of the S Group worker cooperative council since 1999. The SKP represented a joint list with the KTP.

== See also ==
- Politics of Finland
- Communist Youth League (Finland)
- Tiedonantaja
- List of political parties in Finland
- List of Communist Party (Finland) breakaway parties
