= Markus Kainulainen =

Finnish communist politician (1922–2017)

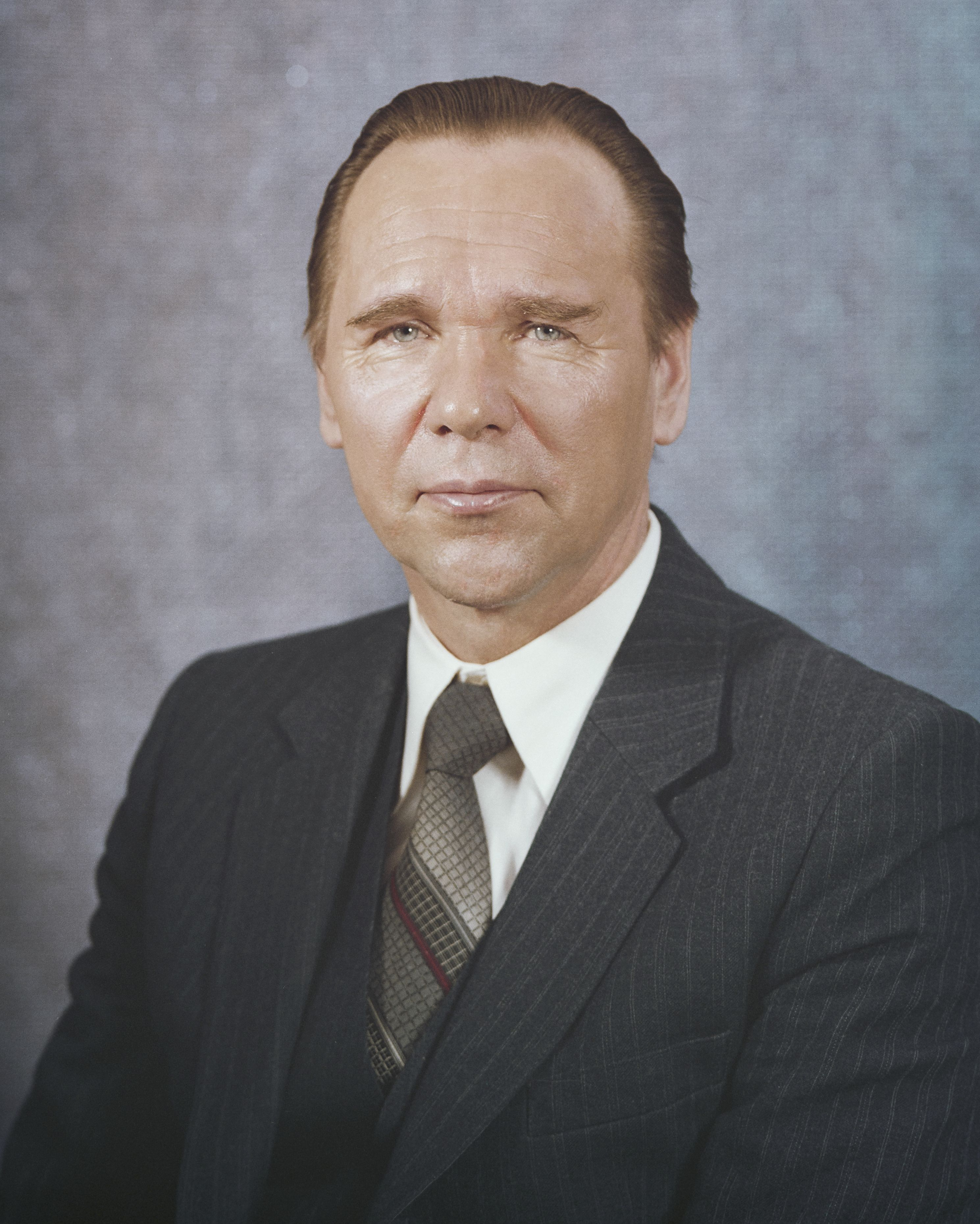
- Kainulainen in 1981
- Born: 9 August 1922; Helsinki, Finland
- Died: 30 August 2017 (aged 95)
- Occupation: Politician
- Political party: Communist Party of Finland (1945-1988); Communist Workers' Party – For Peace and Socialism (1988-2017)
- Spouse: Eila Pesonen
- Children: 2

Markus Kainulainen (9 August 1922, Helsinki – 30 August 2017) was a Finnish communist politician. He was a member of the Central Committee of the Communist Party of Finland (SKP) and served as a Member of the Parliament of Finland from 1975 to 1979 and again from 1982 to 1983, representing the Finnish People's Democratic League (SKDL). After the SKP split in the 1980s, Kainulainen at first joined the Communist Party of Finland (Unity) (SKPy). The SKPy split in 1988 as well and Kainulainen was one of the leading organisers of a new party, Communist Workers' Party – For Peace and Socialism (KTP).

Kainulainen was a member of the Central Committee of the SKP from 1966 to 1969[2] and 1970–1981 and a member of the Political Committee from 1966 to 1969[2] and 1970–1981. Kainulainen was from June to August 2017 the oldest surviving MP together with Pentti Poutanen, who was born on the same day.

== Early life ==
Kainulainen was born in a working-class family in Malmi, Helsinki. He was interested in social concerns at a young age and considered well-known Social Democrats as role models. The relationship with the democrats cooled off when his father, a carpenter, resigned from the local workers' association. Kainulainen worked as a carpentry student.

Kainulainen was conscripted to the army in the fall of 1941 and in 1943 he joined the front line in Syvär. Kainulainen got his eyes wounded in the war. In the autumn of 1944, he returned home and immediately joined the youth wing of the Democratic Party of Malmi, the Finnish-Soviet Society, the Carpenters' Labor Union, and the Malmi Athletes. Kainulainen joined the Communist Party of Finland (SKP) in the summer of 1945. In 1947, Kainulainen married Eila Pesonen.

== Organizational tasks ==
Kainulainen focused on the activities in the Finnish Democratic Youth League (SDNL, Suomen demokraattinen nuorisoliitto). He served as SDNL's secretary for the Uusimaa district. In 1952, Kainulainen was elected chairman of the union with the support of SKP chairman Aimo Aaltonen. He also began his studies at Sirola. Kainulainen was also a member of the executive committee of the World Federation of Democratic Youth (WFDY). Kainulainen resigned from the SDNL in the spring of 1955 after failing to make the union more efficient, and he went to Moscow for studies. Studying in the Soviet Union came during an extraordinary period of reform following the death of Stalin. Kainulainen responded to the upheavals by emphasizing the party's unerringness and the importance of ideological strength. After returning to Finland, he served as countryside correspondent of SKP Helsinki-Uusimaa district up to 1963, until being re-elected as the secretary of the newly independent SKP District of Uusimaa, where he continued for 23 years.

== Under the leadership of the SKP opposition ==
District secretary Kainulainen evolved in the mid-1960s as one of the Communist Party's opposition main players. He strongly condemned any form of revisionism, which represented the majority party led by Aarne Saarinen. Kainulainen was a rhetorical man and easily conflict-prone. In the spring of 1968 he was sought to be dismissed from the SKP Political Committee. However, he survived with a warning. In the fall of 1968 Kainulainen supported the Occupation of Czechoslovakia, which on the other hand SKP condemned.[4] The Opposition Tiedonantaja magazine, originated from the Tiedote (Newsletter) magazine of the Uusimaa District, was founded by Kainulainen in the autumn of 1967. As the first editor-in-chief he recruited his faithful assistant Tauno Wallendahr. Kainulainen was a key figure in the process of turning it into a joint publication of the entire opposition in the autumn of 1968.

At the 15th assembly of the SKP in 1969, Kainulainen led the opposition that was condemned by the majority. Opposition representatives marched out of the meeting after Kainulainen gave a sign. At the rebellion meeting in the Koitto House in Helsinki, Kainulainen supported the establishment of a new ideologically orthodox communist party, but was in a minority with his opinions. Kainulainen negotiated about the new party among others with the Soviet Union Communist Party, but the idea was not accepted by the Soviets. In April 1969, Kainulainen was elected as the executive committee secretary of the Communist Land Advisory Board, which was founded by the opposition.

In the 1970s Kainulainen continued his principled struggle against revisionism and he was alongside Taisto Sinisalo and Urho Jokinen one of the most visible figures in the taistoism movement. He was responsible for the opposition economy through many associations. In the elections of 1975, Kainulainen was elected to the parliament via the SKDL lists. He was a member of the legal committee. Kainulainen departed from parliament in the next elections, but returned to parliament in 1982 for a six-month term to replace Ilkka-Christian Björklund, who was appointed as General Secretary by the Nordic Council. Under the leadership of Kainulainen, the SKP's Uusimaa district was firmly in the hands of the opposition and represented the left wing of the taistoism group.

== Disputes with Taistoist-movement ==
By the 1980s Kainulainen had a falling out with the other taistoism members. Among others, he objected to the so-called "Third Line" tendency, which he found suspicious in the sense of Marxism–Leninism. Kainulainen was also opposed to Mikhail Gorbachev's reforms in the Soviet Union.

In October 1985, the SKP sacked the district organizations of the opposition, including Uusimaa, under the leadership of Arvo Aalto. The separated ones initially operated under the name SKP Organizations and Kainulainen was elected to the Central Committee of Organizations in April 1986. Later, it was renamed as the Communist Party of Finland (Unity) (SKPy). Kainulainen was not elected to the new party's political committee.

== New Party ==
The Marxism–Leninism communists disapproved the SKPy's revisionism and were bound for the creation of a new party led by Kainulainen. The Communist Workers' Party – For Peace and Socialism (KTP) was founded early in 1988. Kainulainen was KTP's most prominent politician and supporters of the party have been called, with regard to his name, the Kainus (kainuslaiset). Kainulainen served on the KTP Political Committee from the inception of the party until 2012 and on the party's central council until 2014.

Kainulainen died at age 95 on August 30, 2017. His wife Eila had died only two weeks earlier at the age of 91.
