= Viljo Pousi =

Finnish politician (1918–1981)

Viljo Anton Pousi (17 January 1918, in Kymi – 6 January 1981) was a Finnish welder, union representative and politician. He was a member of the Parliament of Finland from 1966 to 1970, representing the Social Democratic Union of Workers and Smallholders (TPSL). He was later active within the Socialist Workers Party (STP).
