= Lindgren cabin =

General information
- Architectural style: Finnish log house
- Location: 89990 Hawkins Road; Warrenton, OR 97146
- Completed: 1928
- Relocated: 1968

Technical details
- Material: Old-growth cedar

The Lindgren cabin is a historic log house built in 1928 by Finnish immigrants in the Soapstone Creek wilderness near the community of Hamlet, Oregon in the Nehalem Valley.

The cabin is built from massive hand-hewn logs of old-growth cedar, joined with dovetail joints and constructed without the use of nails.

The cabin and other buildings were built by Erik Lindgren, 68, and his neighbor William Merila. The cabin was used for gatherings of Finnish socialists in a natural setting reminiscent of the Kalevala.

The Lindgrens eventually moved to Astoria and the cabin was left to deteriorate from the elements and vandals. The homestead was saved through the historic preservation efforts of Charles Gilman Davis, an architectural professor at Portland State University, and several Finnish-American organizations.

In 1968, the cabin and outbuildings were carefully disassembled and the marked and numbered beams were moved into storage at Seaside. The homestead was eventually reassembled at Cullaby Lake County Park and opened to the public in 1981.
