= List of strikes in Finland =

Throughout the history of Finland, a number of strikes, labour disputes, student strikes, hunger strikes, and other industrial actions have occurred.

== Background ==
A labour strike is a work stoppage caused by the mass refusal of employees to work. This can include wildcat strikes, which are done without union authorisation, and slowdown strikes, where workers reduce their productivity while still carrying out minimal working duties. It is usually a response to employee grievances, such as low pay or poor working conditions. Strikes can also occur to demonstrate solidarity with workers in other workplaces or pressure governments to change policies.

== 20th century ==
=== 1900s ===
- Finnish general strike of 1905

=== 1940s ===
- 1949 Kemi strike

=== 1950s ===
- Finnish general strike of 1956

=== 1990s ===
- 1990 Finnish bank strike
- 1997–98 Finnish firefighters' strike, 3-month strike by firefighters.
- 1998 Helsinki transport strike, strike by public transport workers in Helsinki, Finland, against sub-contracting of public services.
- 1999 Finnish air traffic controllers' strike, 5-week strike by air traffic controllers in Finland over wages.

== 21st century ==
=== 2000s ===
- 2000 Finnish paper workers' strike

=== 2010s ===
- 2010 Finnish ports strike
- 2019 Finnish postal strike

=== 2020s ===
- 2023 Tesla Sweden strike
- 2024 Finland strikes, large-scale strikes protesting against labour market reforms and social security cuts by the government of Petteri Orpo.

== See also ==
- Economy of Finland
- Socialism in Finland
