= Turpeinen =

Turpeinen is a Finnish surname. Notable people with the surname include:

- Pirkko Turpeinen (born 1940), Finnish psychiatrist and politician
- Aarno Turpeinen (born 1971), Finnish football player
- Viola Turpeinen, American-Finnish accordion player
