= Seppo Toiviainen =

Finnish politician (1944–2005)

Seppo Esko Tapani Toiviainen (6 October 1944 in Kankaanpää – 28 June 2005) was a Finnish social psychologist and politician. He was a Member of the Parliament of Finland, representing the Finnish People's Democratic League (SKDL) from 1979 to 1986 and the Democratic Alternative (DEVA) from 1986 to 1987. He was also active in the Communist Party of Finland (SKP).
