= Women's Democratic Action Centre =

Women's Democratic Action Centre (Finnish: Naisten demokraattinen toimintakeskus) was the women's wing of the leftist party Democratic Alternative (Deva) in Finland 1987-1990. The organisation emerged of a split in the Democratic Women's League of Finland (SNDL) in the spring of 1986, as six SNDL districts (Southern Saimaa, Helsinki, Joensuu, Lahti, Northern Häme and Uusimaa) sided with Deva. SNDL expelled its rebel districts in November 1986.

The centre was founded in April 1987. The five chairwomen chosen at the founding congress were Marja-Liisa Löyttyjärvi, Leena Alanen, Anita Helenius, Eeva Kaukoluoto-Perä and Marja-Leena Mikkola. The organisation began publishing Naisten Lehti. In 1988, the centre also began publishing the Soviet Neuvostonainen in Finnish.

The organisation was dissolved in 1990, as Deva dissolved itself and its members joined the Left Alliance.
