= Ensio Laine =

Finnish politician (1927–2012)

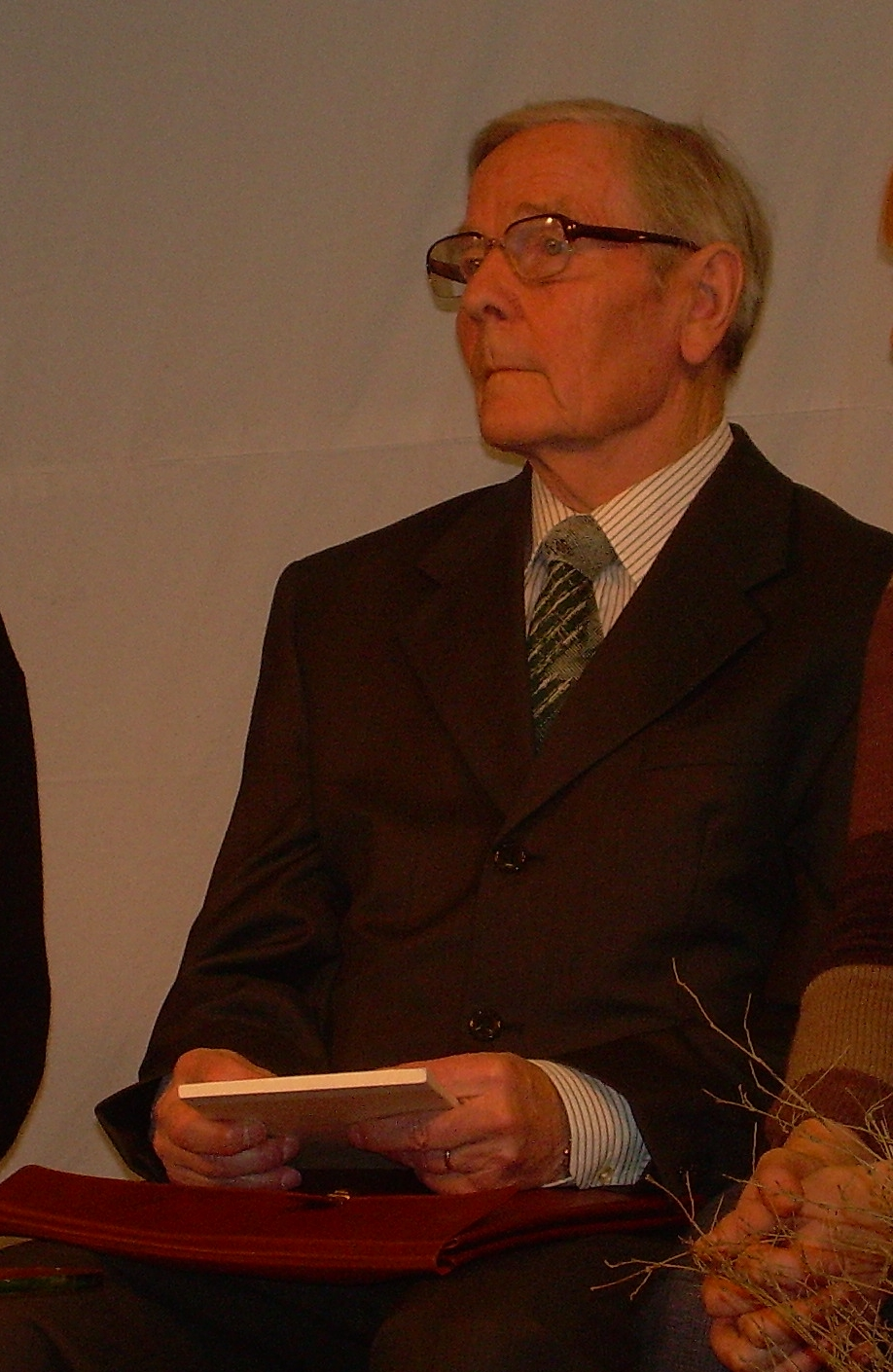
Ensio Laine in 2008

Volmar Into Ensio Laine (2 November 1927 – 2 August 2021) was a Finnish politician, born in Maaria. He was a member of the Parliament of Finland from 1968 to 1995, representing the Finnish People's Democratic League (SKDL) from 1968 to 1986, the Democratic Alternative (DEVA) from 1986 to 1990 and the Left Alliance from 1990 to 1995. He was a member of the Communist Party of Finland (SKP) and later of the Communist Party of Finland (1994). He was a presidential elector in the 1968, 1978 and 1982 presidential elections.
