= Satu Hassi =

Finnish politician (born 1951)

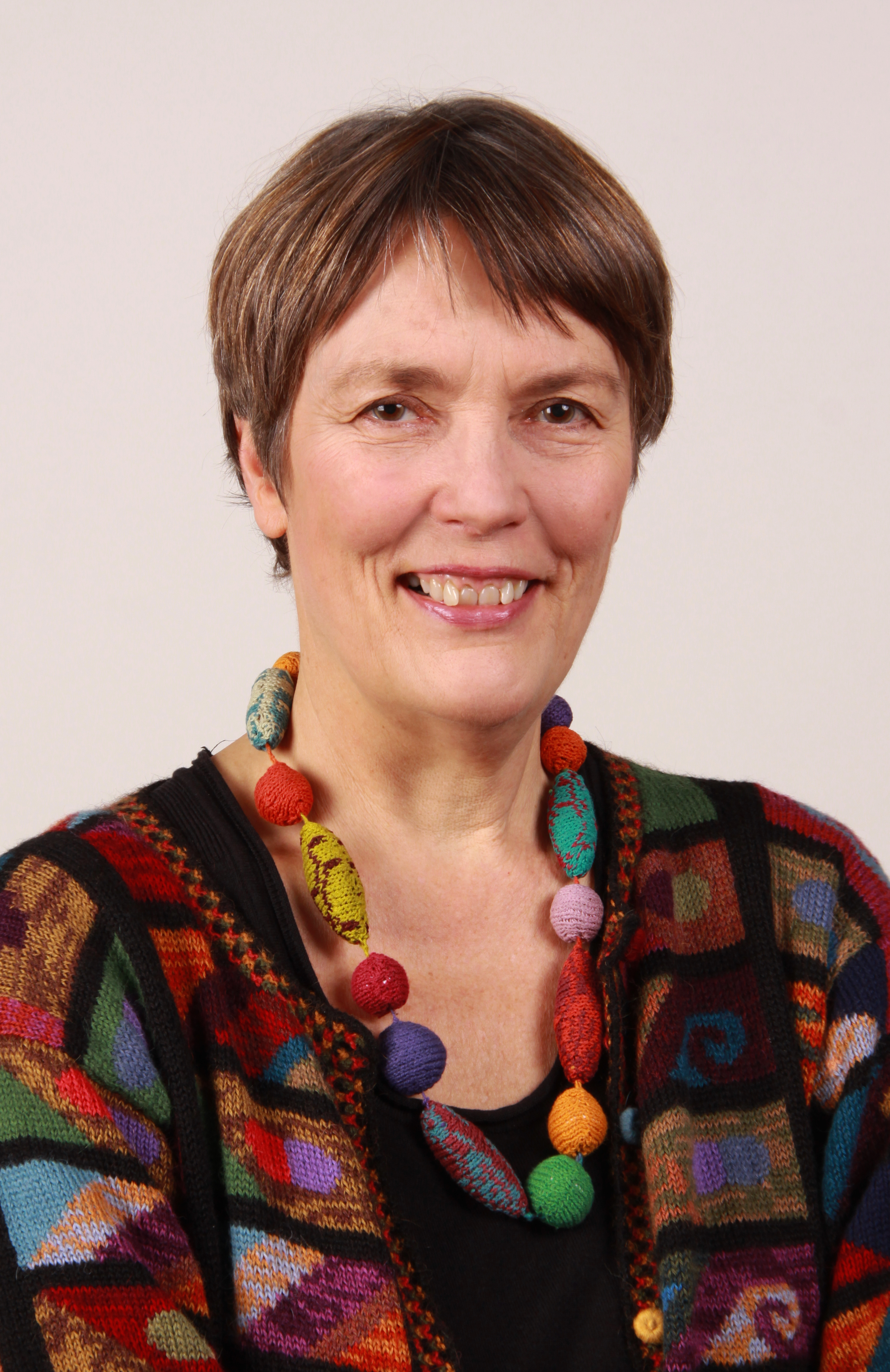

Minister of Environment
- In office 15 April 1999 – 31 May 2002
- Prime Minister: Paavo Lipponen
- Preceded by: Pekka Haavisto
- Succeeded by: Jouni Backman

Member of the European Parliament for Finland
- In office 20 July 2004 – 30 June 2014

Member of the Finnish Parliament
- In office 22 April 2015 – 4 April 2023
- In office 22 March 1991 – 20 July 2004

Personal details
- Born: 3 June 1951 (age 75) Helsinki, Uusimaa, Finland
- Party: Green League
- Website: www.satuhassi.net

Video Introduction (English) / (Finnish)

Satu Maijastiina Hassi (born 3 June 1951) is a Finnish politician, and former Member of the European Parliament for the Green League. She served as the Minister of Environment and Development Co-Operation in Paavo Lipponen's second cabinet between 15 April 1999 and 31 May 2002. In accordance with her party's position on the issue, she quit the cabinet in protest of the government's decision to build a fifth nuclear power plant in Finland. Hassi served as the leader of her party between 1999 and 2001. She was a member of the national parliament from 1991 to 2004; she left the parliament when she was elected to the European Parliament as the sole Finnish Green representative in the 2004 election.

In the European Parliament she was the coordinator of the Greens/EFA parliamentary group in the Committee on the Environment, Public Health and Food Safety and a vice member of the Committee on Industry, Research and Energy. She served in the European Parliament until 2014.

In April 2015, Hassi was re-elected to the Finnish Parliament and took on the role as chairperson of the Environment Committee. She remained in office following the election of 2019, but decided to retire at the end of the term in 2023, as the oldest woman in parliament at the time.

Hassi was previously a taistoist, a pro-Soviet member of the Communist Party in the 1970s.

== Activities outside politics ==
Hassi has a licentiate in technology, has worked as an engineer in a power company and taught at Tampere University of Technology. She has published three novels, a collection of poems and several essays; she has also been co-author of a series of physics books for high school students.

Hassi was a member of the board of directors of the former Worldwatch Institute. She was also a vice chairman of the parliamentary network Globe EU. She has been granted the Golden Peacock Global Award for Environmental Leadership, Hart World Refining Fuels Policy Award and the International Award for Outstanding Contribution for Environment of the Priyadarshni Academy.

Hassi is a breast cancer survivor.

Party political offices
Preceded by Tuija Brax	Chairperson of the Green League; 1997–2001	Succeeded by Osmo Soininvaara
