= Kaisu-Mirjami Rydberg =

Finnish journalist, writer and politician

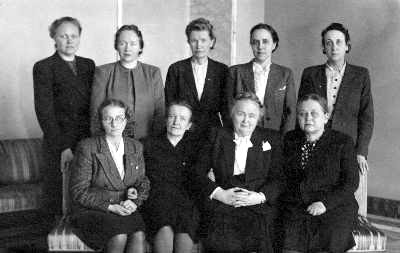
Kaisu-Mirjami Rydberg second from the left in the back row (1947/1948)

Karin Aino Mirjami (Kaisu-Mirjami) Rydberg (April 27, 1905 in Mäntsälä – August 31, 1959 in Helsinki) was a Finnish journalist, writer and politician. Politically she began her career in the Social Democratic Party, but later joined the Communist Party. Rydberg used the aliases 'Karin Alm', 'Eino Jalas' and 'Utelias'.

== Biography ==
She was born to Väinö Riippa and Iida Forsbacka. In 1931 she married Martti Rydberg. In 1939 Rydberg became a member of parliament as a sitting MP, Hannes Ryömä, died. In the parliament, she joined the splinter Socialist Parliamentary Group. As the other members of the Socialist Parliamentary Group, she was arrested and jailed in August 1941. Rydberg was freed on November 4, 1944.

She was elected to parliament in the 1945 election, as a candidate of the Finnish People's Democratic League. In the spring the same year, she joined the Communist Party.

Rydberg was on the editorial board of Vapaa Sana 1944–1948. In 1948 she began working with the publication of the Finland-Soviet Union Association. 1956-1959 she was the literary director of Kansankulttuuri ('People's Culture') publishing house.

== Works ==
- Kirjailijaryhmä Kiilan albumi I 1937, by Viljo Kajava, Kaisu-Mirjami Rydberg and Arvo Turtiainen. Kansankulttuuri 1937
- Häitä vaan : yksinäytöksinen näytelmä. Sos.-dem. työläisnuorisoliitto, Helsinki 1938 (written under the alias 'Eino Jalas')
- Vaella nuoruus, signed 'Karin Alm'. Gummerus 1939
- Mukana myös kirjailijaryhmän Kiilan albumeissa III (1940), IV (1944) ja V (1948)
- Alkukallio : runoja. Tammi 1946 (signed 'Karin Alm')
- Katselin Amerikkaa. Tammi, 1946
- Kuussa : pakinaa Kuun (Pelakuun) menneisyydestä ja nykyisyydestä. Kansankulttuuri 1952 (signed 'Utelias')
- Katselin Kiinaa. Kansankulttuuri 1959
