= Yrjö Hakanen =

Finnish Communist Politician (born 1952)

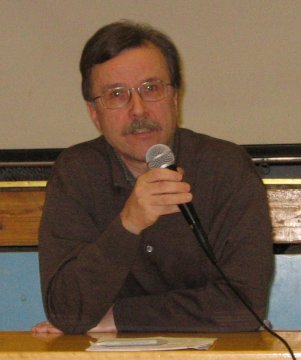

Leader of the Finnish Communist Party
- In office 1994–2013
- Preceded by: Esko-Juhani Tennilä
- Succeeded by: Juha-Pekka Väisänen

Personal details
- Born: 24 August 1952 (age 74) Helsinki, Finland
- Party: Communist Party of Finland
- Education: University of Helsinki
- Occupation: Politician, Journalist

Yrjö Hakanen (born 24 August 1952) is a Finnish politician who served as chairman of the Finnish Communist Party from 1994 to 2013.

Hakanen has a master’s degree in political science from the University of Helsinki. He worked as a journalist while becoming active in the Communist Party of Finland in the 1970's. He became leader of the party in 1994, and stepped down in 2013.

Hakanen was elected to the Helsinki City Council in 2004 as the party’s sole member. He was re-elected again in the years of 2008 and 2012.

Hakanen lives in Helsinki and is married with two adult children. He speaks Finnish, English, and Swedish.
