= Socialist Workers Party (Finland) =

Socialist Workers' Party Sosialistinen Työväenpuolue
- Founded: May 5, 1973
- Split from: Socialist Union of Workers and Smallholders
- Merged into: Left Alliance
- Newspaper: Päivän Uutiset 1973–1976
- Youth wing: Socialist Youth League of Finland
- Women's wing: Social Democratic Women's League of Finland
- Children's wing: Varhaisnuorisoliitto Haukat
- Ideology: Socialism
- Political position: Left-wing

Socialist Workers' Party (Finnish: Sosialistinen Työväenpuolue, Swedish: Socialistiska Arbetarepartiet) was a political party in Finland. The STP was founded in 1973 as split from Social Democratic Union of Workers and Smallholders (TPSL). STP emerged from a group that did not approve of the return of TPSL to the Social Democratic Party.

STP had electoral alliances with Finnish People's Democratic League (SKDL), the mass front dominated by the Communist Party of Finland (SKP) but with little success. When SKP (and SKDL) split in 1985-1986 STP cooperated with Democratic Alternative which was founded by Communist Party of Finland (Unity) (SKPy), a hard-left splinter group from the Communist Party.

In February 1990, STP chairman Pentti Waltzer said the party would join the new Left Alliance if Democratic Alternative decided to merge with it, which later happened.

== Elections ==
Parliament
Year	MPs	Votes	
1975	--	9 457	0.34%
1979	--	2 955	0.10%
Municipal
Year	Councillors	Votes	
1976	2	1 901	0.07%
Presidential
Year	Electors	Votes	
1978	--	2 187	0.1%

== See also ==
- List of Social Democratic Party (Finland) breakaway parties
