= Eeno Pusa =

Finnish politician

Enok (Eeno) Pusa (1 August 1888, Pyhäjärvi Vpl - 9 April 1975) was a Finnish farmer and politician. He was a member of the Parliament of Finland, representing the Social Democratic Party of Finland (SDP) from 1945 to 1951 and from 1955 to 1958 and the Social Democratic Union of Workers and Smallholders (TPSL) from 1961 to 1962.
