= Ida Hämäläinen =

Finnish politician (1875–1961)

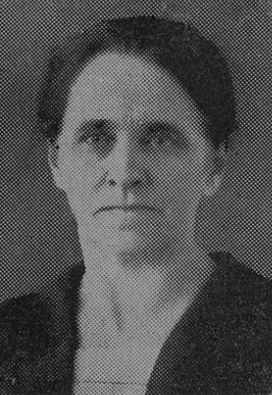
Ida Hämäläinen, 1930

Ida Maria Hämäläinen (née Sepponen; 6 May 1875, Pieksämäki - 27 July 1961) was a Finnish seamstress and politician. She was a member of the Parliament of Finland from 1927 to 1929, representing the Socialist Electoral Organisation of Workers and Smallholders. She was imprisoned from 1930 to 1932 because of her active role in the then illegal Communist Party of Finland (SKP).
