= Pirkko Turpeinen =

Finnish politician (born 1940)

Pirkko Marjatta Turpeinen (born 7 November 1940 in Helsinki) is a Finnish psychiatrist and politician. She was a Member of the Parliament of Finland, representing the Finnish People's Democratic League (SKDL) from 1983 to 1986 and the Democratic Alternative (DEVA) from 1986 to 1987. She has also been active in the Communist Party of Finland (SKP).

Throughout her career she has combined clinical psychiatry, academic writing, public policy, and political engagement, becoming known in Finland for her work in mental health, addiction medicine, and social issues.

== Early life and education ==
Pirkko Turpeinen-Saari was born in Helsinki, Finland, on 7 November 1940. She grew up in a family with a medical and scientific background. Her parents, Kaisa Turpeinen and Osmo Turpeinen, were physicians and researchers whose careers included international scientific work in the United States. Her mother became associated with the development of family-planning services in Finland, while her father conducted research on cholesterol and cardiovascular disease. Turpeinen-Saari later described the scientific and intellectual environment created by her parents as an important influence on her development. Her childhood coincided with the Second World War. During the war, the University of Helsinki's clinic for gynaecology and obstetrics was evacuated to the village of Kankaanpää, where her mother continued working as one of the physicians serving the clinic. Turpeinen-Saari studied medicine at the University of Helsinki and specialized in psychiatry. Her medical training and family background in medicine contributed to her later interest in the relationships among mental health, social conditions and public policy.

== Medical career ==
Turpeinen-Saari spent much of her professional career in psychiatry, with a particular focus on child and adolescent mental health. She served for approximately 25 years as chief physician in adolescent psychiatry for the City of Helsinki. She also worked as a psychiatric expert for the Council of Europe's Committee for the Prevention of Torture (CPT), participating in assessments concerning the treatment and care of people in psychiatric and custodial institutions. Her professional writings have addressed psychiatry, psychotherapy, child development, addiction, trauma, and the relationship between mental health and social conditions. Her later work also examined the relationship between psychological and social conditions and broader political and historical developments.

== Political career ==
Turpeinen-Saari entered national politics through the Finnish People's Democratic League (SKDL) and was elected to the Parliament of Finland in the 1983 parliamentary election from the Uusimaa constituency. During a period of division within the Finnish communist movement, she became associated with the newly established Democratic Alternative (DEVA) and continued to serve in Parliament under its banner until 1987. Her parliamentary work included issues concerning healthcare, social welfare, education, equality, and mental health.

Turpeinen-Saari also participated in the Nordic Council, the inter-parliamentary body comprising the Nordic countries, rather than the separate Council of Europe. In describing her political activities, she has written about what she regarded as the influence of the United States and the arms industry on European political decision-making. She has stated that, during a parliamentary general debate concerning the establishment of the European Union, she discussed what she considered to be the influence of the United States arms industry on the emerging European political structure and subsequently faced a warning from the leadership of the Finnish Parliament over her references to alleged confidential information.

After leaving Parliament, Turpeinen-Saari remained active in Finnish public and political life. She was affiliated with the Social Democratic Party (SDP) between 1991 and 2015 and participated in municipal politics, including service on the Helsinki City Council. Her later political and literary work continued to address international politics, war, human rights, and the relationship between political decision-making and military interests.

In her book ''Permission to Be Cruel'', Turpeinen-Saari discussed the Račak massacre and alleged that the findings of autopsies of victims from the village of Račak were concealed by German and Finnish authorities. She connected the episode to the political circumstances preceding the NATO bombing of Yugoslavia in 1999.

== Writing ==
Her early books, including Inhimillinen kasvu ja yhteisö (1978), Luova yhteistyö vai työ ihmisarvon mittana (1980), and Vieraantuminen, työ, vallankumouksellisuus tänään (1982), explored human development, work, society, and social philosophy.

In 1986 she published Parantajan roolit, a memoir reflecting on her experiences as a physician, psychiatrist, and public figure. The book discusses the ethical responsibilities of healthcare professionals alongside broader reflections on medicine and society.

Her later publications increasingly combined psychiatry with historical analysis. In Ahdingossa luova lapsi ja nuori (2004), she examined child and adolescent psychiatric development and resilience. In Suuri yksinäinen: Urho Kekkonen ja tunteet (2006), she presented a psychological interpretation of Finnish President Urho Kekkonen, exploring the relationship between personality and political leadership.

Among her later historical works is Lahtari, punikki ja teurastaja (2016), which compares the historical figures Carl Gustaf Emil Mannerheim, Kullervo Manner, and Ratko Mladić through psychological and historical perspectives. The work reflects her longstanding interest in applying psychiatric analysis to political leadership, conflict, and historical events.
