= Ville Pessi =

Finnish politician (1902–1983)

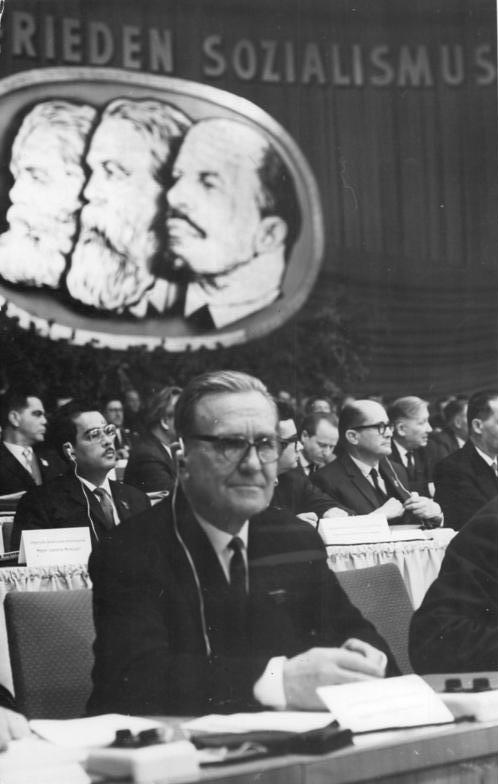
Pessi at the 6th congress of the Socialist Unity Party of Germany in East Berlin, 1963

Ville Pessi (24 March 1902, Kaukola – 6 November 1983, Vantaa) was a Finnish communist politician. Pessi hailed from a proletarian family. He became involved in leftist politics in 1919. He joined the Communist Party of Finland (SKP) in 1924, when it was still illegal. Pessi served as secretary of the Socialist Youth League 1925-1927. He was twice sent by the party to the Soviet Union for studies (at the Communist University of the National Minorities of the West in Leningrad from 1927 to 1930 and at the International Lenin School in Moscow from 1933 to 1934). Soon after he came back to Finland he was arrested and spent the years from 1935 to 1944 in prison. He was freed as a consequence of the Moscow Armistice of 19 September 1944, when the SKP was legalised. He was elected as the general secretary of the SKP in 1944 and served in the post until 1969 when he was replaced by Arvo Aalto. He was a member of the Parliament of Finland from 1945 to 1966, representing the Finnish People's Democratic League (SKDL).

Pessi represented SKP at a number of key international gatherings of the world communist movement; at the 19th (1952), 22nd (1961) and 23rd (1966) congress of the Communist Party of the Soviet Union, the 1957 and 1960 International Meeting of Communist and Workers Parties and the 50th anniversary of the October Revolution.

Pessi resigned from the post and was not re-elected as SKP general secretary at the 15th party congress in 1969. However, he remained on the party politburo. In later years he held the post of honorary chairman of the party, and served as vice chairman of the Finnish Committee for European Security.
