= Communist Youth League (Finland) =

Communist Youth League (Finnish: Kommunistinen nuorisoliitto, KomNL) was a political youth organization in Finland. KomNL collaborated closely with the Communist Party of Finland but Communist Workers' Party activists and independent communists also participated in the league. KomNL was founded in 2000 and absolved in 2019. It is still a registered association.

KomNL was a member of World Federation of Democratic Youth.

== See also ==
- Komsomol
