= List of Social Democratic Party (Finland) breakaway parties =

Since the founding of Social Democratic Party of Finland in 1899 it has seen a steady number of splits and breakaway factions. Some of the breakaway organisations have thrived as independent parties, some have become defunct, while others have merged with the parent party or other political parties

Year	Party	Leader	Status
1918	Communist Party of Finland	Yrjö Sirola	defunct
1920	Socialist Workers' Party of Finland	August Raatikainen	defunct
1959	Social Democratic Union of Workers and Smallholders	Emil Skog	defunct
1973	Socialist Workers Party	Pentti Waltzer	defunct
1998	Reform Group	Risto Kuisma	defunct
