= Heikki Törmä (1918) =

Finnish politician (1918–1993)

Heikki Törmä (24 October 1918 – 18 October 1993) was a Finnish politician, born in Ruovesi. He was a member of the Parliament of Finland from 1958 to 1962, representing the Social Democratic Party of Finland (SDP) until 15 September 1959 and the Social Democratic Union of Workers and Smallholders (TPSL) after that. He was a presidential elector in the 1956 Finnish presidential election.
