= Martta Salmela-Järvinen =

Finnish politician

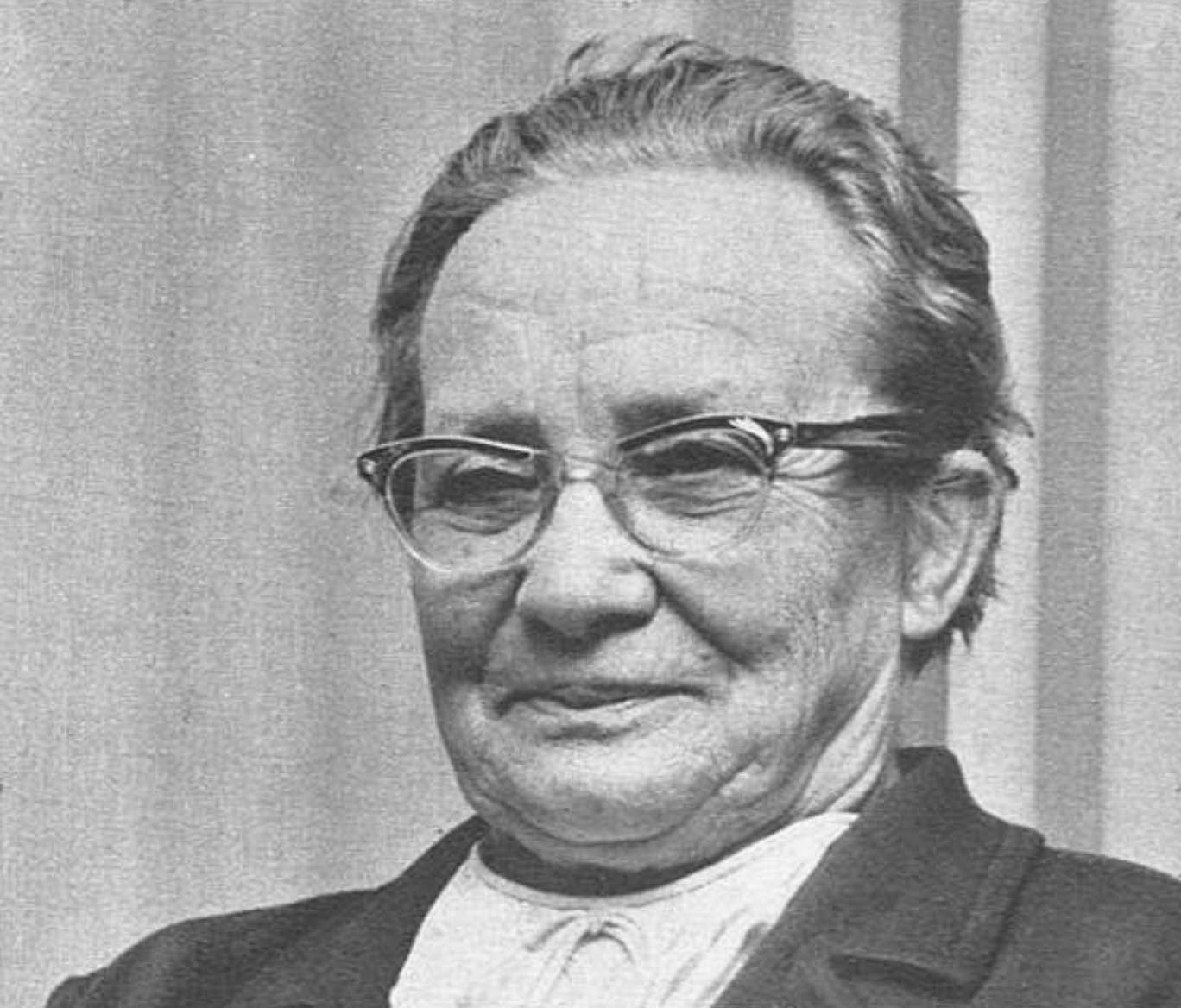
Martta Helena Salmela-Järvinen in 1966

Martta Helena Salmela-Järvinen (born Hellstedt, 31 March 1892, Kylmäkoski – 16 September 1987) was a Finnish politician and writer. At first she was a member of the Social Democratic Party of Finland and, after 1959, of the Social Democratic Union of Workers and Smallholders. She served as a Member of Parliament from 1 September 1939 to 4 April 1966.
