= Aili Siiskonen =

Finnish journalist, civil servant and politician

Aili Siiskonen (9 February 1907 in Mikkeli – 15 January 1983) was a Finnish journalist, civil servant and politician. She was a member of the Parliament of Finland from 1958 to 1962 and from 1966 to 1970. She was at first a member of the Social Democratic Party of Finland (SDP) and later of the Social Democratic Union of Workers and Smallholders (TPSL).
