= Pauli Puhakka =

Finnish politician (1926–2011)

Pauli Antero Puhakka (4 January 1926 – 17 December 2011) was a Finnish politician, born in Ilomantsi. He was a member of the Parliament of Finland from 1954 to 1983, representing the Finnish People's Democratic League (SKDL). Puhakka was a member of the Communist Party of Finland (SKP). He was a presidential elector in the 1956, 1962, 1968 and 1978 presidential elections.
