= Armas Härkönen =

Finnish politician

Armas Härkönen (1 October 1903, Joroinen - 2 September 1981) was a Finnish agricultural consultant, smallholder and politician. He was a member of the Parliament of Finland from 1958 to 1962. He was at first a member of the Social Democratic Party of Finland (SDP), later he joined the Social Democratic Union of Workers and Smallholders (TPSL).
