= Kössi Kaatra =

Finnish journalist (1882–1928)

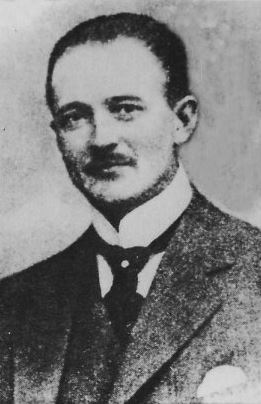
- Born: Gustaf Adolf Lindström; 6 November 1882; Lohja, Grand Duchy of Finland
- Died: 15 November 1928 (aged 46); Huddinge, Sweden

Gustaf Adolf Lindström (6 November 1882 – 15 November 1928), better known under his pen name Kössi Kaatra, was a Finnish working-class poet, journalist and theatre director.

== Biography ==
He was born into a poor working-class family. He became an orphan. As a child, he earned his living by working as a street vendor of newspapers.

In 1899 Kaatra became a lawyer for a law firm. From that period he began to take part in the labor movement. In 1902, he debuted as a poet and wrote in the style of Neo-romanticism.

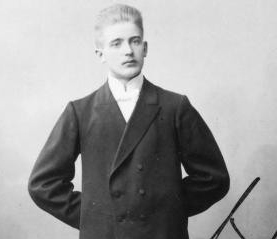
Kaatra in 1903

From 1903 to 1910 he was a journalist and director of the Workers' Theater in Tampere. On November 14, 1905 (November 1 O.S.), he was a leading member of the general strike and it the balcony of Tampere City Hall, he read out the "Red Declaration" (Manifesto of the Finnish People) demanding civil liberties, democracy and labor rights. After the strike, Kaatra started to focus on directing and worked as theatre director in the Tampere Workers' Theatre.

After the February Revolution, Kaatra began to write essays and poetry once. During the Finnish Civil War, his dacha in Oulu was taken over by the White forces. He managed to survive the White Terror by hiding in the attic of his dacha.

Kaatra managed to escape to Sweden where he settled and continued his literary activities until his death in 1928.

== Selected works ==
- Kynnyksellä, poetry. 1903
- Elämästä, poetry. 1904
- Runoja. 1905
- Kyttä, poetry. 1906
- Kahleet pois! 1906
- Murroksessa, poetry. 1906
- Suurlakkokuvia. 1906
- Punaiset ja valkoiset, novel. 1919
- Suuririkos. 1921
- Alhaisolauluja, poetry. 1922
- Ihmisen kauneuteen! 1923.
- Äiti ja poika, 1924
- Soi vapun virsi, poetry. 1926
- Sä syty vapahduksen haltioon! poetry. 1926
- Alhaisolauluja: selected 1903-1927. 1978.
