= Revolutionary Youth League (Finland) =

Vallankumouksellinen Nuorisoliitto (Revolutionary Youth League), a political youth organization in Finland during the 1980s. VKN was the youth wing of Demokraattinen Vaihtoehto (Democratic Alternative). VKN had 3,250 members at one point.
