= Jouko Kajanoja =

Finnish politician (born 1942)

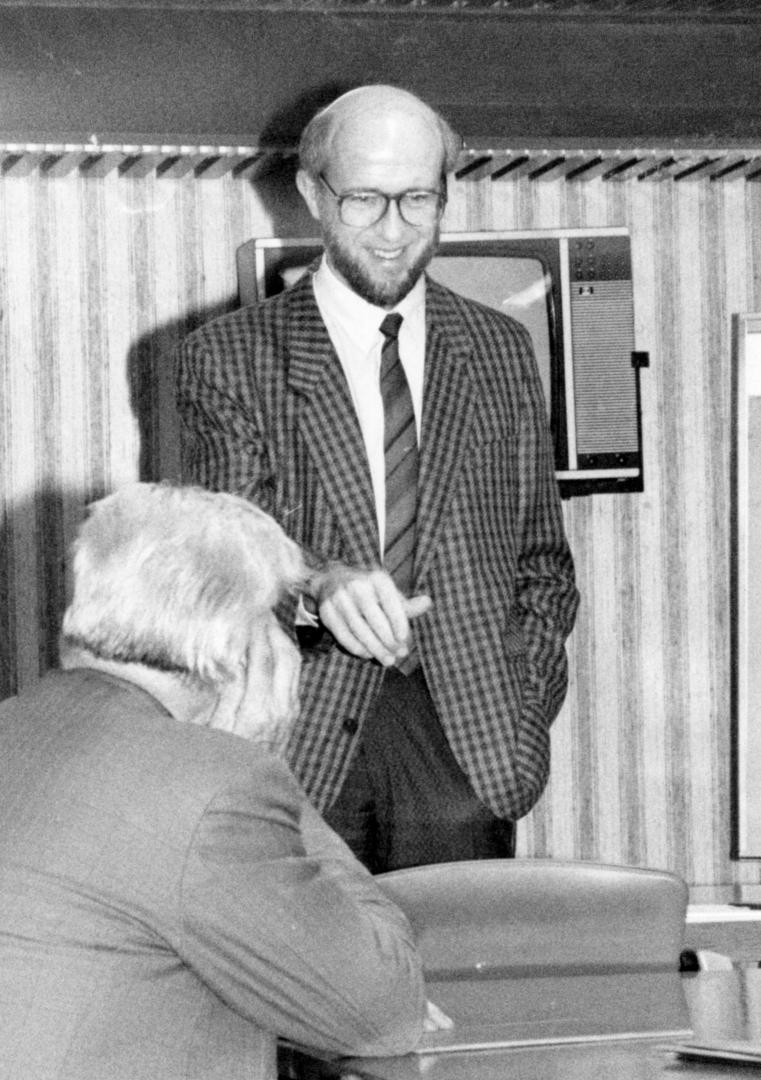

Chairman of the Communist Party
- In office 15 May 1982 – June 1984
- Succeeded by: Arvo Aalto

Minister of Labour
- In office March 1981 – 1982
- Prime Minister: Mauno Koivisto; Kalevi Sorsa

Personal details
- Born: 23 December 1942 (age 83) Tammela, Finland
- Party: Communist Party
- Profession: Economist

Jouko Kajanoja (born 23 December 1942) is a Finnish economist and politician who served as minister of labour between 1981 and 1982. He was a member of the Communist Party which he headed from 1982 to 1984.

== Biography ==
Kajanoja was born in Tammela, Finland, on 23 December 1942. He joined the Communist Party being part of the fraction which was the third group after the moderates and doctrinaire faction. In March 1981 he was appointed minister of labour to the cabinet led by Mauno Koivisto. He also served in the same post in the next cabinet led by Kalevi Sorsa.

On 15 May 1982 Kajanoja became the chairman of the Communist Party. He was elected to the post as a result of the conflicts between the leaders of two major fractions within the party. Kajanoja was supported by the Soviet Communist Party during his tenure which ended in June 1984 when Arvo Aalto won the election. In the election Aalto won 183 votes against 163 votes in favor of Kajanoja.

Later Kajanoja became secretary general of the Democratic Choice. On 13 August 1987 Kajanoja was nominated by the Democratic Alternative as the candidate for the presidency. He could obtain only 1.4% of the votes in the elections held in February 1988.

Kajanoja was married to Pirjo Turpeinen-Saari in the period between 1985 and 1996.
