= Red Declaration =

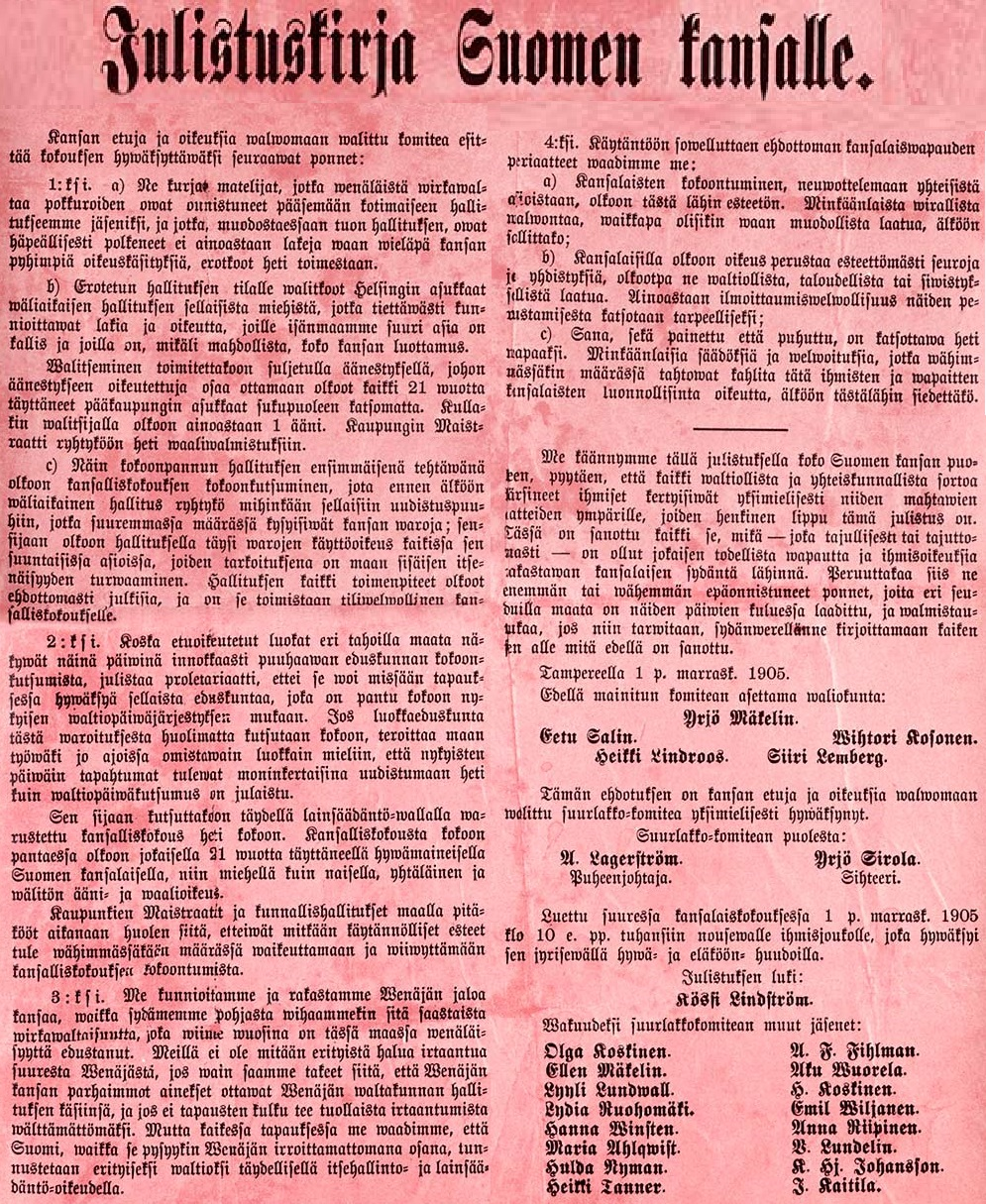
The upper part of the Red Declaration

The Red Declaration (Finnish: punainen julistus) is a document published in Tampere on 1 November 1905. It called for the Senate of Finland to resign; demanded universal suffrage, freedom of assembly, and freedom of association; as well as asking for an end to censorship.

The text was drafted by Yrjö Mäkelin, the chief editor of the Tampere social democratic newspaper Kansan Lehti on 30 October, during the time of the general strike in response to the Russian Revolution. It was read out by poet Kössi Lindström on the balcony of Tampere City Hall on 1 November.

The declaration was printed on red paper, from which it got its name; this was not an intentional reference to the political left. The text contained the demands of the workers, but even the constitutionalists endorsed its contents.

One of the consequences was a parliamentary reform that gave workers – and even women – the right to vote.

== See also ==
- Russification of Finland
