= Social Democratic Union of Workers and Smallholders =

Defunct political party in Finland

- Finnish name: Työväen ja Pienviljelijäin Sosialidemokraattinen Liitto
- Founded: 1959
- Dissolved: 1973
- Split from: Social Democrats
- Merged into: Social Democrats
- Newspaper: Päivän Sanomat
- Youth wing: Socialist Youth League of Finland
- Women's wing: Social Democratic Women's League
- Children's wing: Varhaisnuorisoliitto Haukat
- Ideology: Social democracy Labourism; Left-wing populism
- Political position: Left-wing

Party flag

Social Democratic Union of Workers and Smallholders (Finnish: Työväen ja Pienviljelijäin Sosialidemokraattinen Liitto, TPSL) was a political party in Finland. TPSL originated as a fraction of the Social Democratic Party of Finland, headed by Emil Skog and Aarre Simonen. Skog was the former chairman of SDP and was in dispute with the incumbent chairman, Väinö Leskinen. The party was founded in 1959, had seats in the parliament in 1959–1970 and was dissolved in 1973. It was generally identified as being politically between SDP and SKDL (a Communist-dominated organization).

== History ==
The fraction split from SDP in 1959 after few years of infighting. It also retained SDP's party platform until 1967, opining that SDP didn't follow its own platform. The main cause for the rift was that SDP's party leadership, particularly Väinö Tanner and Väinö Leskinen wanted to develop the party towards a "general party" appealing to the entire public. TPSL in contrast, as the name suggests, wanted SDP to be a special interest party for the workers and small farmers. Leskinen wanted to co-operate with the right wing, based SDP politics on the general population, and his economic policy was conservative and deflatory, and he criticised agricultural subsidies. In contrast, Skog's fraction wanted to co-operate with the agrarians and other leftists in popular front governments (kansanrintamahallitus), and base their politics exclusively on the trade unions. For example, Heikki Laavola has written that the disagreement was not over left vs. right ideology; all of Tanner, Leskinen, Skog and Simonen had been formerly active in anti-Communist pursuits. Disagreements between and about individuals played a role; Tanner had actually been convicted (under Soviet pressure) for being responsible to the Continuation War, and as such, he being the leader of SDP was a problem to the Soviets.

The rift was accompanied by a division in associated societies and the trade unions. The main trade union, Central Organisation of Finnish Trade Unions, was controlled mostly by Skog's men, as was the youth league, sports federation and women's league. The first example was that SDP's leadership wanted the worker's sports federation to associate with the right-wing sports federation in order to qualify for entry to Olympics, which Skog's fraction disputed as bourgeoise.

TPSL had 13-15 representatives of 200 in the parliament after the split in 1959, gained only two in 1962 elections, got seven representatives in 1966 and permanently dropped out of the parliament in 1970. Significantly, TPSL co-operated with the especially powerful President Urho Kekkonen, and was a partner in coalition cabinets (Karjalainen I, Paasio I, Koivisto I). In 1963, SDP changed its policy such that good relations with Kekkonen and Soviet Union were a new priority, thus removing a significant cause for disagreement. Skog himself returned to SDP in 1965. TPSL radicalized and became more Soviet-friendly, but lost its popular support, and was dissolved in 1973. The decision was made in December 1972 as TPSL board voted 10–3 for the return to the SDP. A minority faction, including Simonen and some other former MPs, formed the Socialist Workers Party.

== Members of Parliament ==
in 1958–1959 Parliamentary Group of Social Democratic Opposition

- Laura Brander-Wallin 1962
- Vappu Heinonen ^{SDP→}1958–1962, 1966–1970
- Mikko Hult ^{SDP→}1958–1962
- Armas Härkönen 1958–1962
- Urho Kulovaara ^{SDP→}1958–1962
- Tyyne Leivo-Larsson 1966–1970
- Valdemar Liljeström ^{SDP→}1958–1960
- Impi Lukkarinen ^{SDP→}1958–1970
- Aino Malkamäki 1960–1961
- Viljo Pousi 1966–1970
- Eeno Pusa 1961–1962
- Olavi Saarinen 1966–1970
- Martta Salmela-Järvinen ^{SDP→}1958–1966
- Aili Siiskonen 1958–1962, 1966–1970
- Aarre Simonen ^{SDP→}1958–1962
- Arvo Sävelä ^{SDP→}1958–1962
- Arvi Turkka ^{SDP→}1958–1962
- Vilho Turunen 1958–1962
- Heikki Törmä ^{SDP→}1959–1962
- Olli J. Uoti 1959–1962, 1966–1967

== Election results ==
=== Parliamentary elections ===
Finlands riksdag
Date	Votes			Seats		Position	Size
Date	No.	%	± pp	No.	±	Position	Size
1958	33,947	1.75	New	3 / 200	New	Opposition	7th
1962	100,396	4.36	▲2.61	2 / 200	▼1	Opposition	7th
1966	61,274	2.59	▼1.77	7 / 200	▲5	Coalition (SDP–KESK–SKDL–TPSL)	7th
1970	35,453	1.40	▼1.19	0 / 200	▼7	Extra-parliamentary	▼8th
1972	25,527	0.99	▼0.41	0 / 200	0	Extra-parliamentary	▼9th

Local
Year	Vote %	Type
1960	3.40	Municipal
1964	2.95	Municipal
1968	1.78	Municipal
1972	0.54	Municipal

==== Presidential elections ====
Electoral college
Election	Candidate	Popular vote			First ballot		Second ballot		Third ballot		Results
Election	Candidate	Votes	%	Seats	Votes	%	Votes	%	Votes	%	Results
1962	Emil Skog	66,166	3.0	2 / 300							Lost
1968	Urho Kekkonen	46,833	2.3	6 / 300							Lost

== See also ==
- List of Social Democratic Party (Finland) breakaway parties
