= Erkki Kivimäki =

Finnish diplomat (1936–2017)

Erkki Juhani Kivimäki (23 May 1936 – 1 May 2017) was a Finnish diplomat. He served as Finnish Ambassador at the Embassy of Finland in Argentina, Buenos Aires from 1996 to 2001.

Previously, he was Finnish Ambassador to Venezuela in Caracas and in Managua in Nicaragua from 1980 to 1985.

He was born in Varkaus and worked as a diplomat in Stockholm, Madrid, Washington and West Berlin (at the time of collapse of the wall). In the 1970s he was the Foreign Ministry's Representative in the selection of criteria for Vietnamese refugees. Later, as a representative of the Ministry of Foreign Affairs he was involved in the Nordic co-operation. After his retirement he wrote comments on foreign and domestic politics of Finland under the pen name OP. He died in Hattula, aged 80.
