= Yrjö Mäkelin =

Finnish shoemaker, journalist and politician

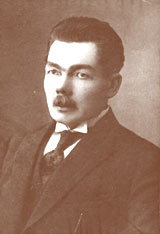
Yrjö Mäkelin.

Yrjö Esalas Emanuel Mäkelin (1 June 1875 – 18 September 1923), was a Finnish Socialist, journalist, a leader of the Finnish labour movement and Member of Parliament 1908–1910, 1913–1918.

Mäkelin was born in Tampere. He was editor of Kansan Lehti (People's Paper), later also of Oikeus (Justice), which he founded in Helsinki, and of Kansan Tahto (People's Will) in Oulu.

Mäkelin wrote several important texts: Finnish Labour Party's 1903 Forssa Declaration on Universal Suffrage; the Red Declaration during 1905 general strike that demanded dissolution of Senate of Finland and universal suffrage, political freedoms, and abolition of censorship. 18 July 1917 Socialist-majority Parliament accepted (pro 135, against 55) a law crafted by his committee to transfer the ultimate political power in Finland to Parliament of Finland. The Russian Provisional Government chose to ignore the law and dissolved the Parliament of Finland.

After the Finnish Civil War he was captured by the Whites and sentenced to death, later converted to a life sentence. A general pardon was granted 1922 and Mäkelin was released. After the division of the Finnish Social Democratic Party, he chose the Communist side, so he was arrested again in August 1923, and then committed suicide in prison in September 1923.

6000–7000 people took part in his funeral in Oulu. A street was later named after him.
