= Taisto Sinisalo =

Finnish politician (1926–2002)

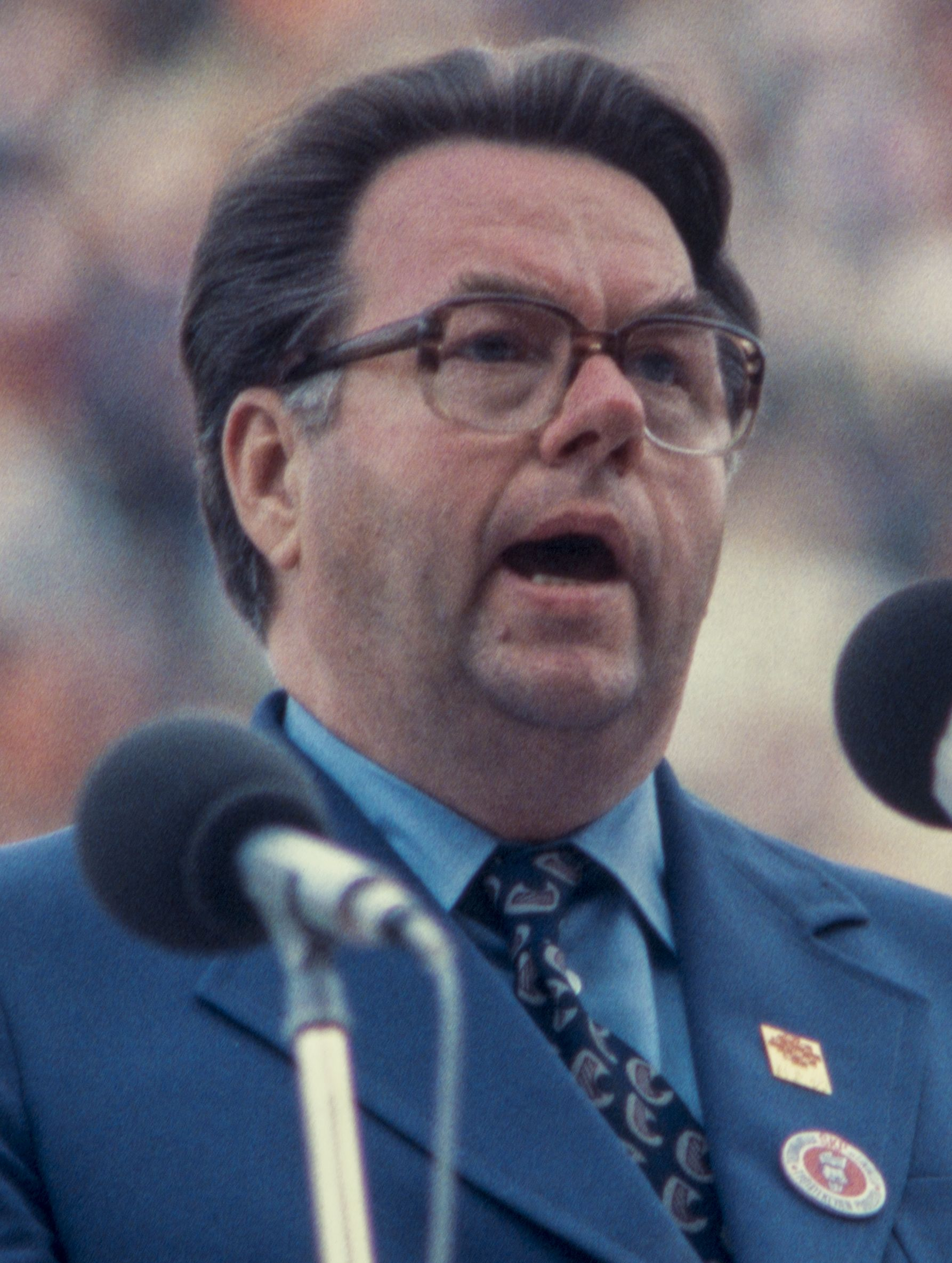
Taisto Sinisalo in 1978.

Taisto Jalo Sinisalo (29 June 1926 – 26 March 2002) was a Finnish communist politician, MP of the SKDL (1962–1978), leader of the Communist Party of Finland’s hardline pro-Soviet faction (also known as taistoists after Sinisalo's first name) and vice chairman of the party (1970–1982). After the SKP split in the 1980s, Sinisalo became the first chairman of the Communist Party of Finland (Unity) (SKPy).
