= Marja-Liisa Löyttyjärvi =

Finnish engineer and politician (born 1949)

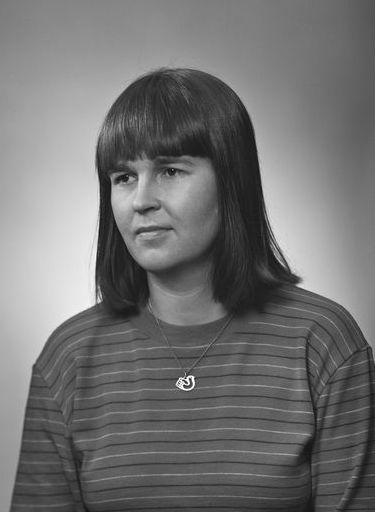

Member of the Parliament
- In office 24 March 1979 – 21 March 1991

Personal details
- Born: 1949 (age 76–77) Helsinki, Finland
- Party: Communist Party of Finland; Finnish People's Democratic League; Democratic Alternative; Left Alliance
- Education: Helsinki University of Technology; Aalto University
- Occupation: Engineer

Marja-Liisa Löyttyjärvi (born 1949) is a Finnish engineer and socialist politician. She served at the Parliament from 1979 to 1991 for various leftist political parties. She also headed the now-defunct Democratic Alternative until 1990.

== Early life and education ==
Löyttyjärvi was born in Helsinki in 1949. She obtained a master's degree in engineering from Helsinki University of Technology in 1997. She received her Ph.D. from Aalto University in December 2011, and her thesis was related to the construction of the Kemijoki watershed.

== Career and activities ==
Löyttyjärvi worked as a land surveying engineering in Espoo. She was a member of the Communist Party of Finland and was part of its Uusimaa district organization between 1978 and 1979. She served in the Espoo city council from the Finnish People's Democratic League between 1973 and 1988.

Löyttyjärvi was elected to the Parliament for the Finnish People's Democratic League on 24 March 1979. Then she held the post for the Democratic Alternative between 4 June 1986 and 10 September 1990. During this period she headed the party. Next she was part of the Left Alliance at the Parliament from 11 September 1990 and 21 March 1991. She represented Uusimaa during her tenure at the Parliament.

Löyttyjärvi worked at the Espoo newspaper service center from 1992 to 1996.

Löyttyjärvi has published scholarly articles.
