= Democratic Alternative (Finland) =

Finnish political party

- Finnish name: Demokraattinen Vaihtoehto
- Swedish name: Demokratiskt Alternativ
- Founded: April 12, 1986
- Dissolved: 1990
- Split from: Finnish People's Democratic League
- Merged into: Left Alliance
- Newspaper: Tiedonantaja
- Student wing: Socialist Student League
- Youth wing: Revolutionary Youth League
- Women's wing: Women's Democratic Action Centre
- Ideology: Communism
- Political position: Far-left

Democratic Alternative (Finnish: Demokraattinen Vaihtoehto; Swedish: Demokratiskt Alternativ) was a political party in Finland. Deva was formed in 1986 by expelled members of the Communist Party of Finland and its mass front Finnish People's Democratic League. In 1990 Deva disintegrated and its members joined the Left Alliance, a merger of SKP and SKDL, founded earlier that year.

Deva consisted of Communist Party of Finland (Unity), Revolutionary Youth League, Women's Democratic Action Centre, Socialist Students' League and Democratic Civic Association. The Socialist Workers' Party (STP) had candidates on Deva list in the 1987 election, but STP was never a member of Deva.

Deva contested the 1987 parliamentary elections and won 122,181 votes (4.24%). Marjatta Stenius-Kaukonen, Ensio Laine, Marja-Liisa Löyttyjärvi and Esko-Juhani Tennilä were elected MPs. Jouko Kajanoja was the party candidate in the 1988 presidential election. Kajanoja gathered 44 428 votes (1.44%). The electors on Deva list got 56,528 votes (1.89%). In the 1988 local elections, 127 Deva councillors were elected to over 70 municipality councils. Their best results were in Karkkila (19.6%, 7 councillors) and Nokia (15.5%, 6). Deva also participated in trade union and cooperative elections.

== Leaders ==
- Leo Suonpää 4/1986–12/1986
- Kristiina Halkola 1986–1989 (first female party chair in Finnish party history)
- Marja-Liisa Löyttyjärvi 1989–1990

== See also ==
- List of Communist Party (Finland) breakaway parties
