= Arvo Aalto =

Finnish politician (1932–2025)

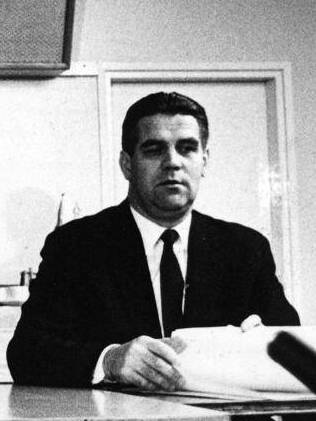
- Aalto in 1970

Chairman of the Communist Party
- In office June 1984 – 1988
- Preceded by: Jouko Kajanoja

Minister of Labour
- In office 1977–1981
- Succeeded by: Jouko Kajanoja

Personal details
- Born: 13 July 1932 Rovaniemi, Finland
- Died: 28 April 2025 (aged 92)
- Party: Communist Party of Finland
- Children: 2
- Education: Sirola Institute

Arvo Aulis Aalto (13 July 1932 – 28 April 2025) was a Finnish politician who headed the Communist Party of Finland between 1984 and 1988. He also served as the Minister of Employment in the Finnish government from 1977 to 1981.

== Early life and education ==
Aalto was born in Rovaniemi on 13 July 1932. He graduated from Sirola Institute in 1956 and also, received education at Moscow Party School in the period 1961–1962.

== Career ==
Aalto was a trade unionist. He joined the Communist Party in 1951. He was its secretary in Lapland in 1956 and part of the progressive group in the party. He was elected as the general secretary of the party under party chairman Aarne Saarinen in 1969 replacing Ville Pessi in the post. Pessi had resigned from the post due to internal conflicts in the party. Aalto served as the general secretary until 1984 with some interruptions. During his term the leadership of the Communist Party was progressive and revised the manifesto of the party.

Aalto served as the Minister of Employment in the Finnish Government from 1977 to 1981. He was replaced by Jouko Kajanoja in the post. In June 1984, Aalto was elected as the chairman of the Communist Party obtaining 183 votes against 163 votes in favor of the former chairman Jouko Kajanoja. During his tenure Aalto visited China in January 1987 becoming the highest ranking Finnish communist to visit China in more than 20 years. Aalto headed the party until May 1988 when he and the politburo resigned due to economic crisis experienced by the party.

== Personal life and death ==
Aalto had two daughters, Pirjo and Sirpa. While serving as the chairman of the Communist Party he was not so close to the Soviet Communist Party. He did not support the NATO membership of Finland.

Aalto died on 28 April 2025, at the age of 92.
