= Communist Party of Finland =

Far-left political party in Finland (1918–92)

Communist Party of Finland Suomen Kommunistinen Puolue
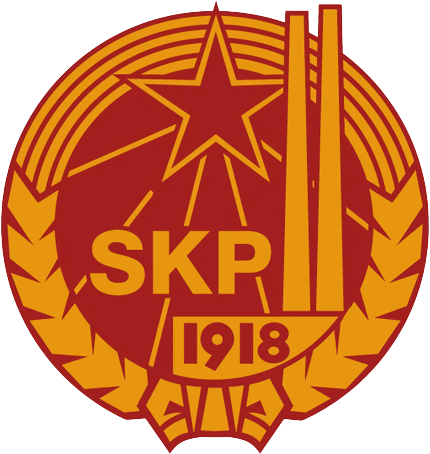
- Abbreviation: SKP
- Founded: 29 August 1918
- Legalized: 1944
- Dissolved: 1992
- Split from: Social Democratic Party of Finland
- Succeeded by: Left Alliance; Communist Party of Finland (1994)
- Youth wing: Young Communist League of Finland
- Ideology: Communism; Marxism–Leninism (until 1970s); Eurocommunism (from 1970s); Factions: Taistoism (until 1980s)
- Political position: Far-left
- National affiliation: Finnish People's Democratic League
- International affiliation: Comintern
- Colors: Red

The Communist Party of Finland (Finnish: Suomen Kommunistinen Puolue, SKP; Swedish: Finlands Kommunistiska Parti) was a communist political party in Finland. The SKP was a section of Comintern and illegal in Finland until 1944.

The SKP was banned by the state from its founding and did not participate in any elections with its own name. Instead, front organisations were used. In the 1920s, the communists took part in the Socialist Workers' Party of Finland (1920–1923) and the Socialist Electoral Organisation of Workers and Smallholders (1924–1930). Both of them were also banned. In 1944, a new front, the Finnish People's Democratic League was formed. The SKP controlled these fronts but they always had a prominent minority of non-communist socialists.

== History ==
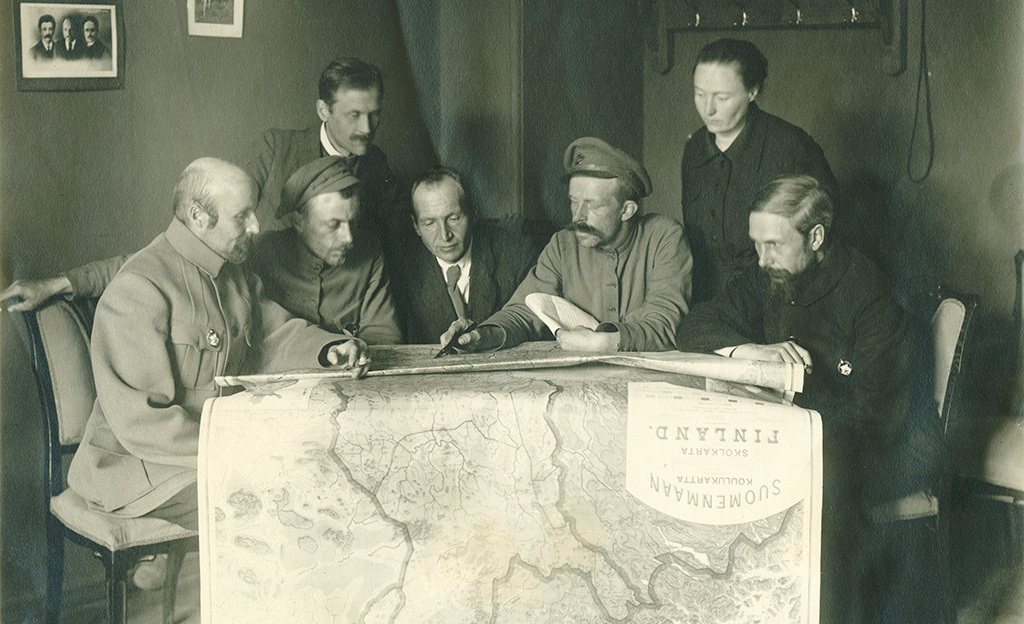
Central Committee of the exile Communist Party of Finland (SKP) in Moscow, 1920. From left to right: K. M. Evä, Jukka Rahja, Jalo Kohonen, Kullervo Manner, Eino Rahja, Mandi Sirola and Yrjö Sirola.

=== Early stages ===
In 1918, the Reds lost the Finnish Civil War. The Social Democratic Party of Finland had supported the losing side, and several of its leaders were exiled in Soviet Russia. Some of these exiles founded the Communist Party of Finland in Moscow.

The SKP was illegal in Finland until 1944, and members could be imprisoned. After the Continuation War, the SKP dominated the Finnish People's Democratic League, which was founded in 1944 as an umbrella organization of the radical left.

=== Cold War ===
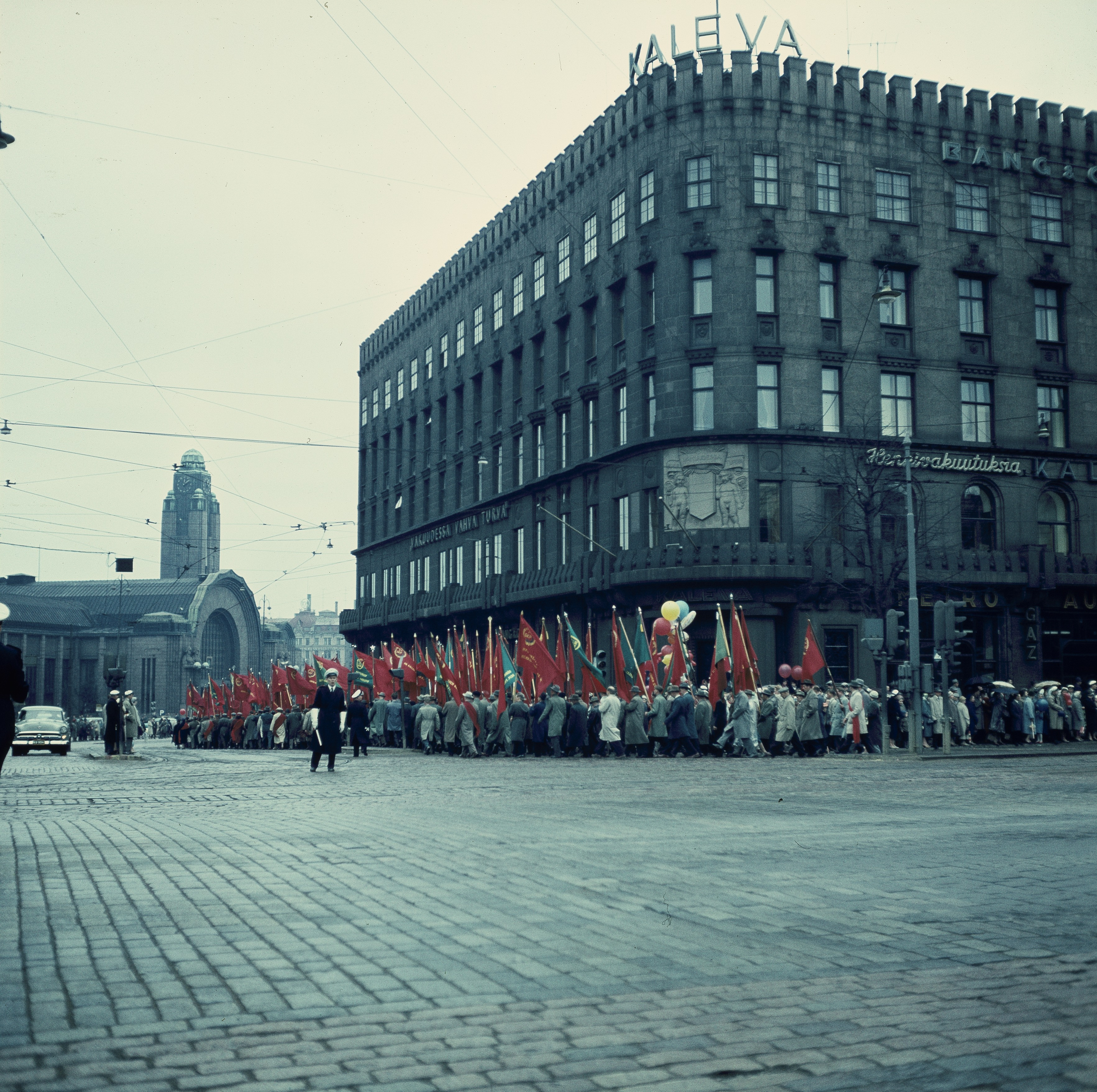
Labour Day march of the Communist Party of Finland on Kaivokatu in Helsinki on May 1, 1960

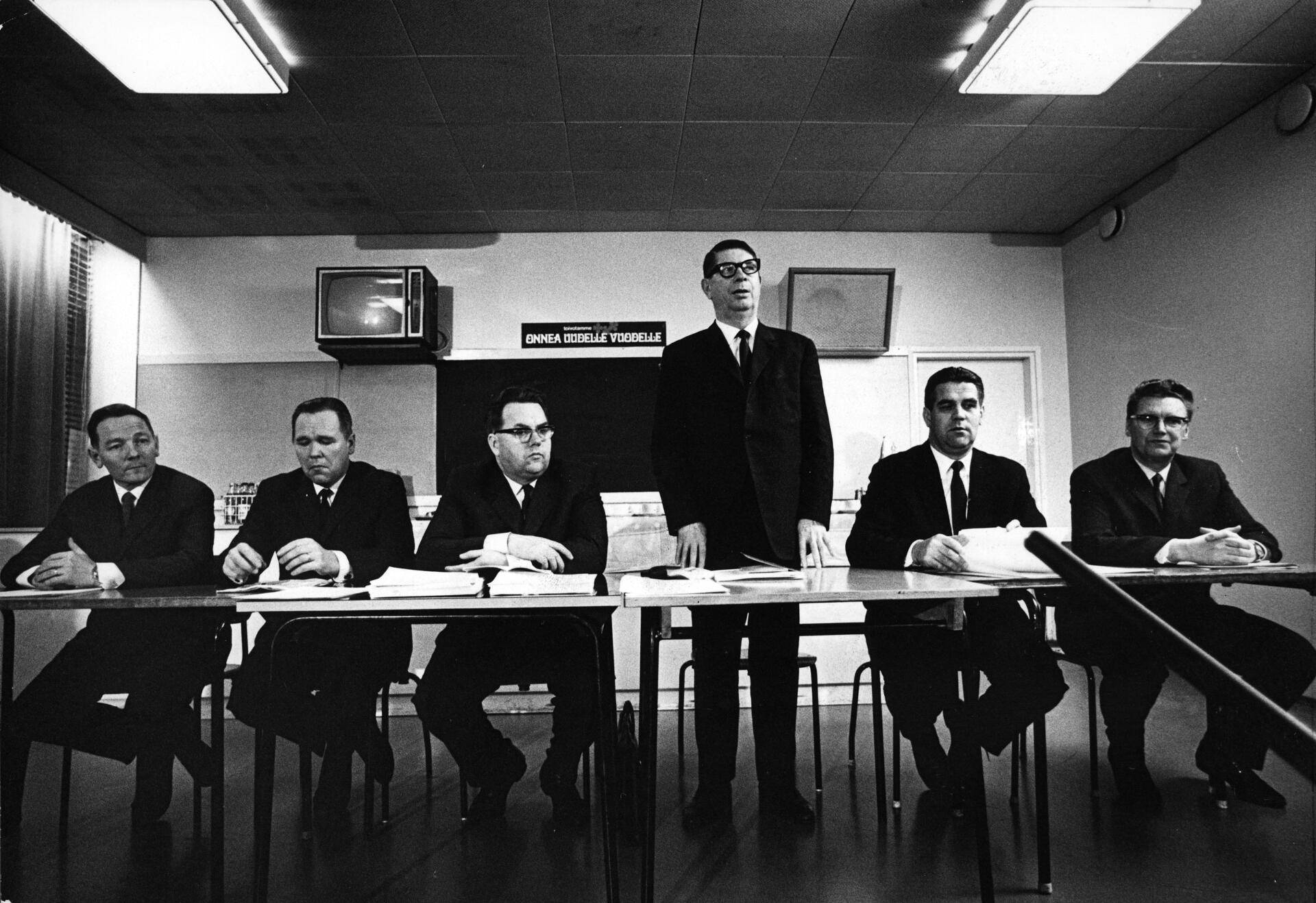
Leaders of the Communist Party of Finland: Ensio Laine (left), Markus Kainulainen, Taisto Sinisalo, Aarne Saarinen, Arvo Aalto, and Erkki Kivimäki in 1970

The Cold War era was the high point of Communists in Finland. Between 1944 and 1979, support of the Finnish People's Democratic League was in the range of 17%–24%. Communists participated in several cabinets, but Finland never had a communist Prime Minister or President. In the mid-1960s, the U.S. State Department estimated the party membership to be approximately 40,000 (1.44% of the working age population). with the SKP's main rival for domination of the political left being the Social Democratic Party of Finland. The competition was very bitter in trade unions and other leftist organizations.

The SKP received substantial financial support from the Soviet Union during the Cold War. Internally, SKP was divided, with a Eurocommunist mainstream and a hardline pro-Moscow minority, called the Taistoists after their leader, Taisto Sinisalo. The word "taisto" also means "battle" or "fight"; the double connotation made this slur, originally launched by the largest Finnish newspaper Helsingin Sanomat, stick. Soviet threats to withdraw support were the main reason why the majority did not expel the Taistoists from the party leadership or membership.

=== Aftermath of the Prague Spring ===
The events of the Prague Spring followed by the Warsaw Pact invasion of Czechoslovakia had strong repercussions for the SKP. With the SKP's leadership strongly denouncing the Soviet intervention, internal disputes became fiercer than ever. While a de facto Eurocommunist majority held sway, the Taistoist minority decisively stood by the Soviet Union and the Brezhnev doctrine. Gradually this led to a disintegration, and in practice, the party now consisted of two parallel structures, and gradually lost ground in terms of public support. The most hardline leader of the party, Markus Kainulainen, led a group that even opposed Soviet policies after the Perestroika had begun.

In 1985–1986, a large number of Taistoists, hundreds of party organizations with thousands of members, were expelled. They regrouped as the Communist Party of Finland (Unity) (SKPy) which later evolved into the current Communist Party of Finland (1994).

=== Collapse ===
The dissolution of the Soviet Union in the early 1990s led to ideological conflicts: bitter internal disputes plagued the party. Bad stock-market investments made during Arvo Aalto's term of office resulted in financial bankruptcy in 1992. The SKP never recovered. A majority of the party members, with other member-organizations of SKDL, formed the Left Alliance in 1990.

SKPy, originally the faction of the party expelled in 1985–1986, outlasted its parent and registered itself as the Communist Party of Finland in 1997, but has failed to regain the former Communist Party's parliamentary representation. In the elections of 2007 it won 0.7% of the vote; in April 2011, it won just 0.3%.

== Youth wing ==
The youth wing of the SKP was the Communist Youth League of Finland (SKNL, 1925–1936). After World War II, young communists were active in the SKDL's Democratic Youth League of Finland (SNDL). The SNDL was member of World Federation of Democratic Youth.

== Leaders ==
Chairmen

Yrjö Sirola	1918–1920
Kullervo Manner	1920–1935
Hannes Mäkinen	1935–1937
Jukka Lehtosaari	1937–1938
Aimo Aaltonen	1944–1945 & 1948–1966
Aaro Uusitalo	1945–1948
Aarne Saarinen	1966–1982
Jouko Kajanoja	1982–1984
Arvo Aalto	1984–1988
Jarmo Wahlström	1988–1990
Heljä Tammisola	1990–1992

General secretaries

Arvo Tuominen	1935–1940
Ville Pessi	1944–1969
Arvo Aalto	1969–1977 & 1981–1984
Erkki Kivimäki	1977–1981
Aarno Aitamurto	1984–1985
Esko Vainionpää	1985–1988
Heljä Tammisola	1988–1990
Asko Mäki	1990–1992

== See also ==
- Kaisu-Mirjami Rydberg
- List of Communist Party (Finland) breakaway parties
- List of Social Democratic Party (Finland) breakaway parties
