= Reino Breilin =

Finnish schoolteacher and politician (1928–2010)

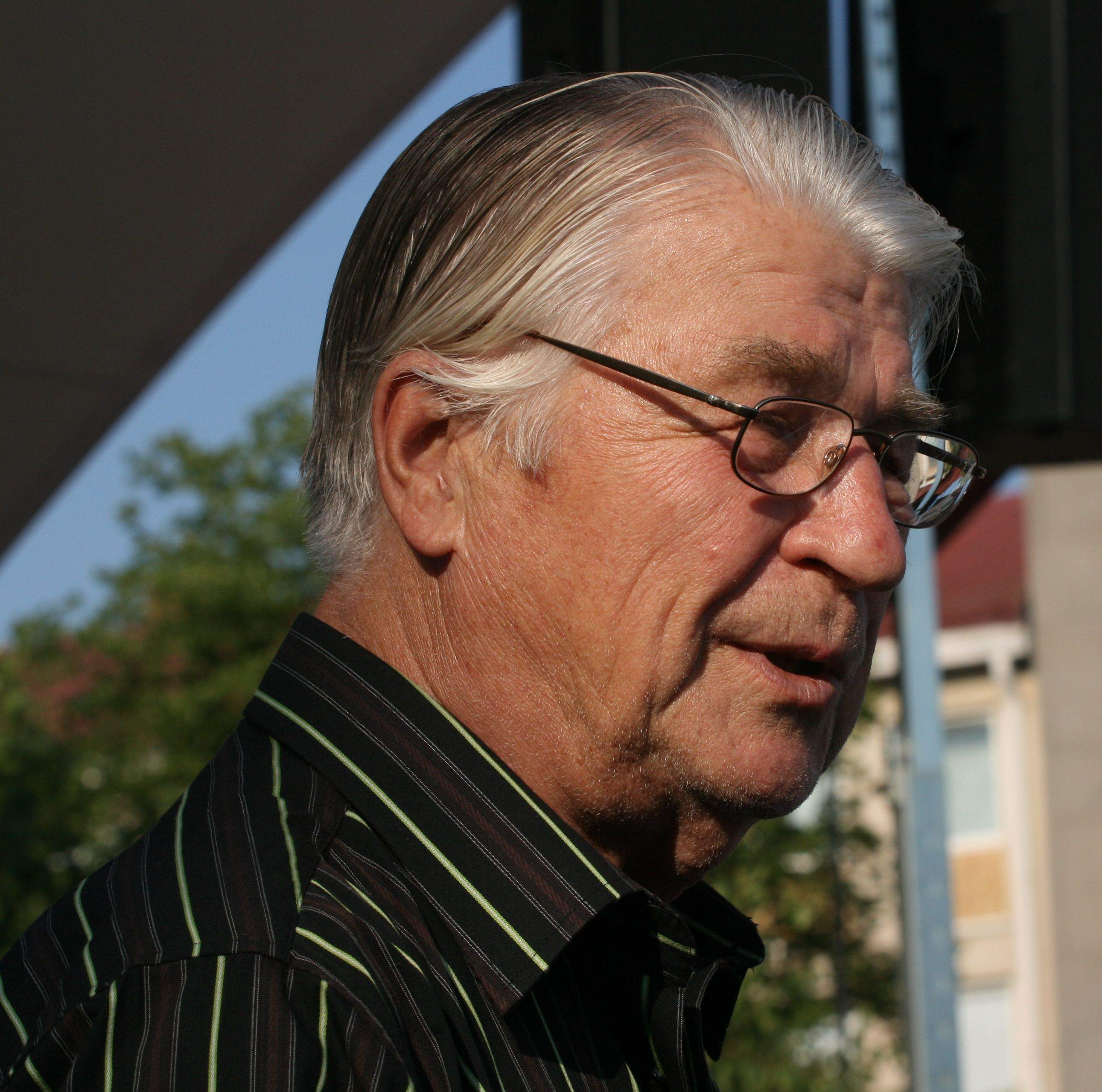
Reino Breilin

Reino Volmar Breilin (20 January 1928 – 23 August 2010) was a Finnish schoolteacher and politician, born in Paimio. He was a member of the Parliament of Finland from 1966 to 1983, representing the Social Democratic Party of Finland (SDP). He served as minister of transport from 31 December 1982 to 6 May 1983. He was a presidential elector in the 1968, 1978, 1982 and 1988 presidential elections.
