= Valtioneuvos =

Finnish honorary title

Valtioneuvos (Finnish for “counsellor of state”, Swedish: statsråd) is a Finnish title of honor awarded by the President of Finland to elder statesmen. It is one of two titles (the other being vuorineuvos) in the highest class of State of Finland honors. A tax on the titles of 48,400 euros or 12,100 euros must be paid by whoever proposes the title to a holder.

== Title holders ==
Portrait	Title holder (born–died)	Awarded (year)	Awarder (by President of Finland)	Political career statues	Party
	Juho Kusti Paasikivi (1870–1956)	1930	Lauri Kristian Relander	President, Prime minister and member of parliament	Finnish Party and National Coalition Party
	E. N. Setälä (1864–1935)	1934	P. E. Svinhufvud	cabinet minister and member of parliament	Young Finnish Party and National Coalition Party
	Eero Yrjö Pehkonen (1882–1949)	1948	Juho Kusti Paasikivi	Provincial Governor, member of parliament and cabinet minister	Agrarian League
	Karl-August Fagerholm (1901–1984)	1969	Urho Kekkonen	Speaker of Parliament and Prime minister	Social Democratic Party
	Martti Miettunen (1907–2002)	1977	Urho Kekkonen	Speaker of Parliament, Member of parliament and Prime minister	Center Party
	Johannes Virolainen (1914–2000)	1989	Mauno Koivisto	Speaker of Parliament, Member of parliament and Prime Minister	Center Party
	Harri Holkeri (1937–2011)	1998	Martti Ahtisaari	Prime minister and member of parliament	National Coalition Party
	Riitta Uosukainen (1942–)	2004	Tarja Halonen	Speaker of Parliament, Member of parliament and Minister	National Coalition Party
	Matti Vanhanen (1955–)	2024	Alexander Stubb	Prime minister, Speaker of Parliament	Center Party
