= Henrik Westerlund =

Finnish farmer and politician (1926–2016)

Paul Gustav Henrik Westerlund (18 August 1926 – 22 June 2016) was a Finnish farmer and politician, born in Nurmijärvi. He was a member of the Parliament of Finland from 1966 to 1995, representing the Swedish People's Party of Finland. He was a presidential elector in the 1962, 1968, 1978 and 1982 presidential elections.
