= Forssa Program =

Political declaration

The Forssa Program (Finnish: Forssan ohjelma) is a political declaration issued by the Labour Party of Finland at its party convention in Forssa, Finland in August 1903. At the same time the party was renamed Social Democratic Party of Finland. The program served as the official platform of the Social Democratic Party until 1952.

== Contents ==
The Forssa Program was based on the Hainnfeld program issued by the Social Democratic Party of Austria and the Erfurt Program issued by the Social Democratic Party of Germany. It included the following eleven claims:

1. Universal suffrage, proportional representation, unicameralism and secret ballot
2. Direct democracy
3. Freedom of association, assembly, speech and the press
4. Free and mandatory education
5. Separation of church and state and abolition of religious education
6. Introduction of a progressive income tax
7. Free trial and legal aid and compensation for false indictments
8. Publicly funded health care
9. Abolition of conscription and promotion of pacifism
10. Gender equality under law
11. Prohibition of alcohol

The Forssa Program was more socialist than the previous program of the Labour Party which was based on the thoughts of Viktor Julius von Wright.
