= Kalevi Kivistö =

Finnish politician (born 1941)

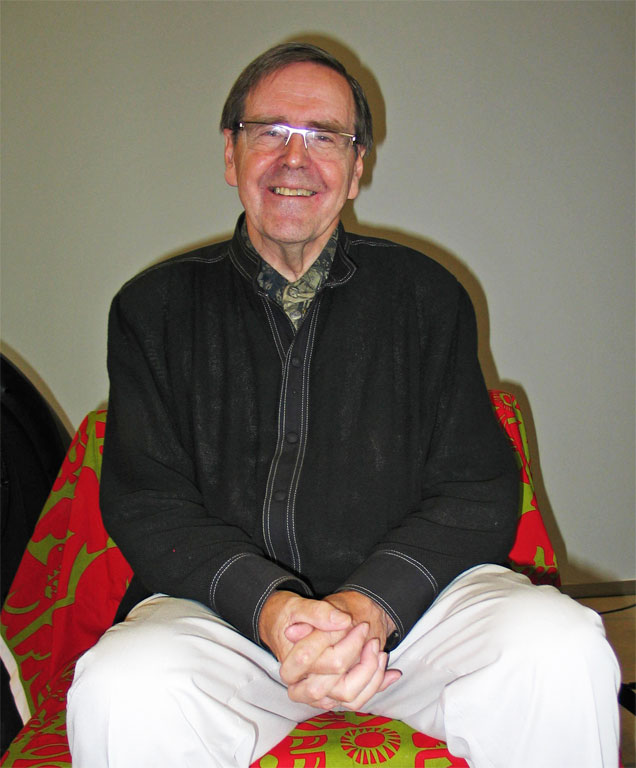
- Kivistö in 2010

Deputy Minister of Education of Finland
- In office 30 November 1975 – 29 September 1976

Deputy Minister of Education of Finland
- In office 15 May 1977 – 19 February 1982

Minister of Education of Finland
- In office 19 February 1982 – 31 December 1982

Member of the Parliament of Finland
- In office 22 January 1972 – 31 December 1984

Personal details
- Born: Kalevi Johannes Kivistö; 25 March 1941 (age 85) Kurikka, Finland

Kalevi Johannes Kivistö (born 25 March 1941) is a Finnish politician. He was a Member of the Parliament of Finland for the Finnish People's Democratic League (SKDL) 1972–1984, the Deputy Minister of Education 1975–1976 and 1977–1982, and the Minister of Education 1982. Kivistö was also the chairman of the SKDL 1979–1985 and the Governor of Central Finland Province 1985–1997. He ran for the President of Finland in the 1982 and 1988 elections.

Kivistö graduated as a teacher from the University of Jyväskylä in 1966 and studied social science in the University of Helsinki graduating in 1969. In 1964–1984, Kivistö was a teacher and professor in the University of Jyväskylä. After his governor's term, Kivistö worked in the Ministry of Education 1997–2004.

As the SKDL was dissolved in 1990, Kivistö joined its successor Left Alliance. He was a member of the Espoo City Council 2008–2017.
