= Mikkel Näkkäläjärvi =

Finnish politician (born 1990)

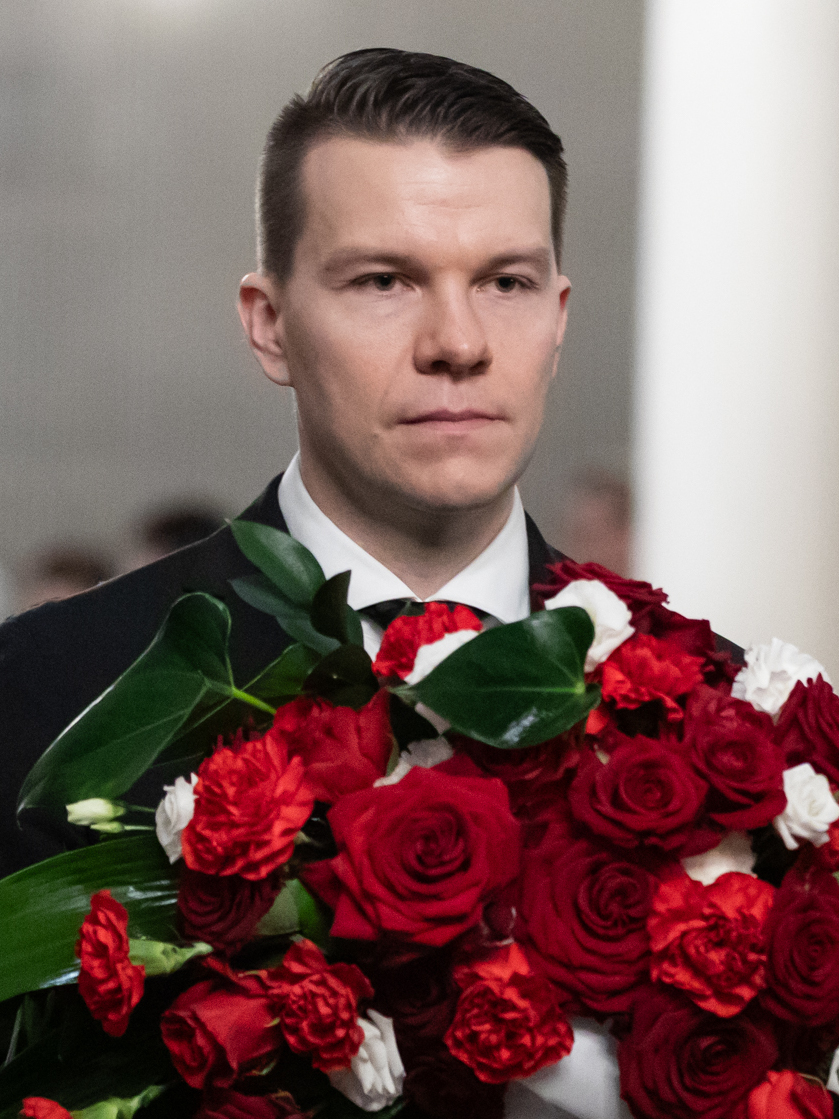
- Näkkäläjärvi in 2023

Personal details
- Born: 19 June 1990 (age 36) Inari, Finland
- Party: SDP
- Education: University of Lapland

Mikkel Antte Iisakki Näkkäläjärvi (born 19 June 1990) is a Finnish politician who serves as the Party Secretary of the SDP. He served as the chairman of the Social Democratic Youth from 2016 until 2020 and is the second vice-chairman of the Rovaniemi City Council. Since spring 2020, he has been working as the regional manager of Northern Finland for the service sector trade union PAM.

Näkkäläjärvi has served as Vice President of the Finnish Association of Student Unions and as President of the Nordic and Baltic Social Democratic Youth.

== Political career ==
Näkkäläjärvi was named Finland's UN Youth Delegate 2015. Näkkäläjärvi was the SDP's parliamentary candidate in the Lapland constituency in the 2015 parliamentary election. He received 640 votes and was not elected.

He was elected President of the Social Democratic Youth at the 2016 Federal Assembly. He was re-elected for another term at the 2018 Federal Assembly. At the 2020 Federal Assembly, Näkkäläjärvi did not seek another term.

In the 2017 municipal elections, Näkkäläjärvi was elected as a first-time candidate to Rovaniemi City Council with 335 votes. In the 2021 municipal elections, Näkkäläjärvi was elected for a further term to Rovaniemi City Council with 344 votes.

In the 2019 European Parliament election, Näkkäläjärvi received 10,761 votes and was not elected. During the early voting period, a controversy arose when it was revealed that he had previously been convicted of animal welfare offences and drink-driving.

In the 2023 parliamentary election, Näkkäläjärvi was the SDP candidate in the Lapland constituency. He received 3,853 votes, which was enough for a seat as a deputy member of parliament. He was elected as the Party Secretary of the SDP in September 2023.

== Personal life ==
Näkkäläjärvi is originally from Inari and lives in Rovaniemi with his wife and two children. He has a master's degree in Administrative Sciences from the University of Lapland. He previously studied mechanical and production engineering in Vaasa. Näkkäläjärvi's father is a North Sami. Näkkäläjärvi is a reindeer herder.

Helsingin Sanomat published a report on the candidates' criminal convictions before the 2019 EU elections. Näkkäläjärvi was not mentioned by name in the article, but he said he was the Social Democrat candidate mentioned in the article. He said his actions were the worst mistakes of his young life.

=== Criminal convictions ===
Näkkäläjärvi was fined in 2006 for animal protection offences, trespassing and criminal damage as a result of breaking in to a cabin and killing several cats and burning them in bonfire. In 2011, he was convicted of aggravated drunk driving and endangering traffic safety, and sentenced to 30 days suspended imprisonment and an additional fine. Näkkäläjärvi had used a form to declare that he had informed the party of the possible conviction when he stood as a candidate. However, he had not done so.
