= Nils Robert af Ursin =

Finnish schoolteacher and politician

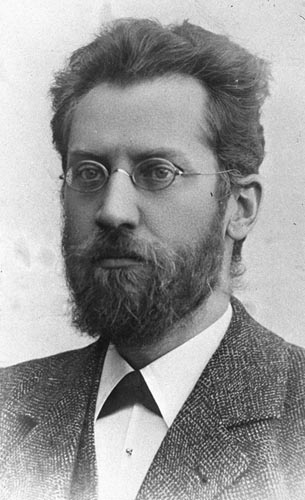
N. R. af Ursin.

Nils Robert af Ursin (18 April 1854, Kuopio – 8 May 1936, Hämeenlinna) was a Finnish secondary school teacher and politician. He was a member of the Diet of Finland from 1891 to 1900 and again from 1904 to 1905 and of the Parliament of Finland from 1907 to 1908.

Af Ursin was at first active in the Young Finnish Party, but his views evolved gradually from liberalism to socialism and in 1899 he was among the founders of the Finnish Labour Party (which changed its name to Social Democratic Party of Finland in 1903) and served as the first chairman of the party from 1899 to 1900. During the Finnish Civil War in 1918, he sided with the Reds and when the Red side lost the war, he went into exile in Soviet Russia. When the Communist Party of Finland (SKP) was founded on 29 August 1918 in Moscow by most of the exiled leaders of Red Finland, af Ursin did not join it. He left Soviet Russia for Sweden in 1920 and returned to Finland in 1922.
