= Harri Holkeri =

Prime Minister of Finland from 1987 to 1991

Valtioneuvos Harri Holkeri
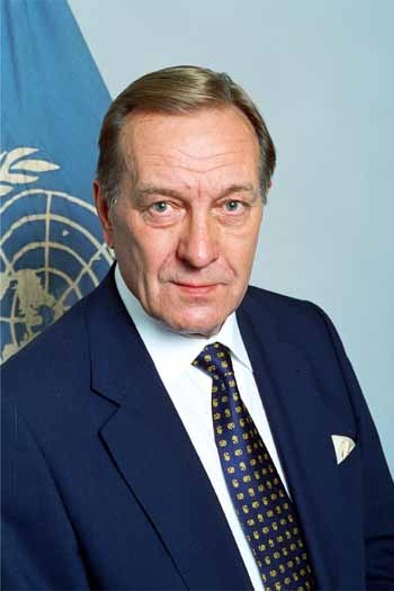

36th Prime Minister of Finland
- In office 30 April 1987 – 26 April 1991
- President: Mauno Koivisto
- Deputy: Kalevi Sorsa; Pertti Paasio
- Preceded by: Kalevi Sorsa
- Succeeded by: Esko Aho

4th Special Representative of the Secretary-General for Kosovo
- In office 25 August 2003 – 11 July 2004
- Preceded by: Michael Steiner
- Succeeded by: Søren Jessen-Petersen

President of the United Nations General Assembly
- In office 5 September 2000 – 10 September 2001
- Preceded by: Theo-Ben Gurirab
- Succeeded by: Han Seung-soo

Personal details
- Born: Harri Hermanni Holkeri; 6 January 1937 Oripää, Finland
- Died: 7 August 2011 (aged 74) Helsinki, Finland
- Party: National Coalition
- Education: University of Helsinki
- Profession: Master of Political Sciences

Harri Hermanni Holkeri (Note: Finnish pronunciation: [ˈhɑrːi ˈhermɑnːi ˈholkeri]) (6 January 1937 – 7 August 2011) was a Finnish statesman representing the National Coalition Party of Finland (Kokoomus / Samlingspartiet). He was the Prime Minister of Finland 1987–1991, president of the UN General Assembly 2000–2001 and headed the United Nations Interim Administration Mission in Kosovo from 2003 to 2004 (leaving the position in the summer of the second year because of health issues).

== Domestic offices ==
Harri Holkeri was member of the board of directors of the Bank of Finland from 1978 to 1997, and candidate in the president elections of 1982 and 1988. He also served as a member of Parliament from 1970 to 1978 and as the chairman of the National Coalition (Conservative) Party from 1971 to 1979. On 1 July 1991 he made the world's first official GSM call, to Kaarina Suonio, vice mayor of the city of Tampere. The historic call used Nokia gear on GSM's original 900 MHz band.

== Legacy ==
He chaired the United Nations General Assembly during the 55th session (2000–2001). He also played a constructive role in securing the Good Friday Agreement in Northern Ireland.

== Cabinets ==
- Holkeri Cabinet

== Later years and death ==
In his last years, Holkeri resided in Kruununhaka, Helsinki, where on a November day in 2008 he was walking outside a grocery store, when a robber tackled him while fleeing. Holkeri was badly wounded, broke his hip and needed a joint replacement surgery on his hips. The suspect turned himself in to the police, but stated that he did not intend to harm Holkeri and that the tackle was an accident. Holkeri sued the suspect for temporary and permanent damages for a total of €8,400.

Holkeri died in 2011 in Helsinki.

== Honors and awards ==
=== Domestic ===
Holkeri was awarded the highest Finnish honorary title of Counselor of State in 1998 by the President of Finland Martti Ahtisaari.

=== Foreign ===
Holkeri's efforts in Northern Ireland were rewarded with an honorary KBE from Queen Elizabeth II of the United Kingdom.

Political offices
Preceded by Kalevi Sorsa	Prime Minister of Finland; 1987–1991	Succeeded by Esko Aho
Positions in intergovernmental organisations
Preceded by Theo-Ben Gurirab	President of the United Nations General Assembly; 2000–2001	Succeeded by Han Seung-soo
