= 1988 Finnish presidential election =

← 1982	31 January – 1 February 1988	1994 →
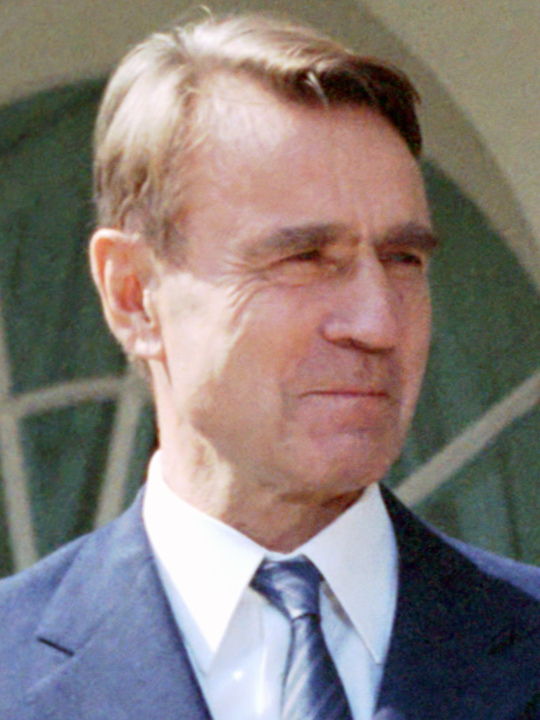

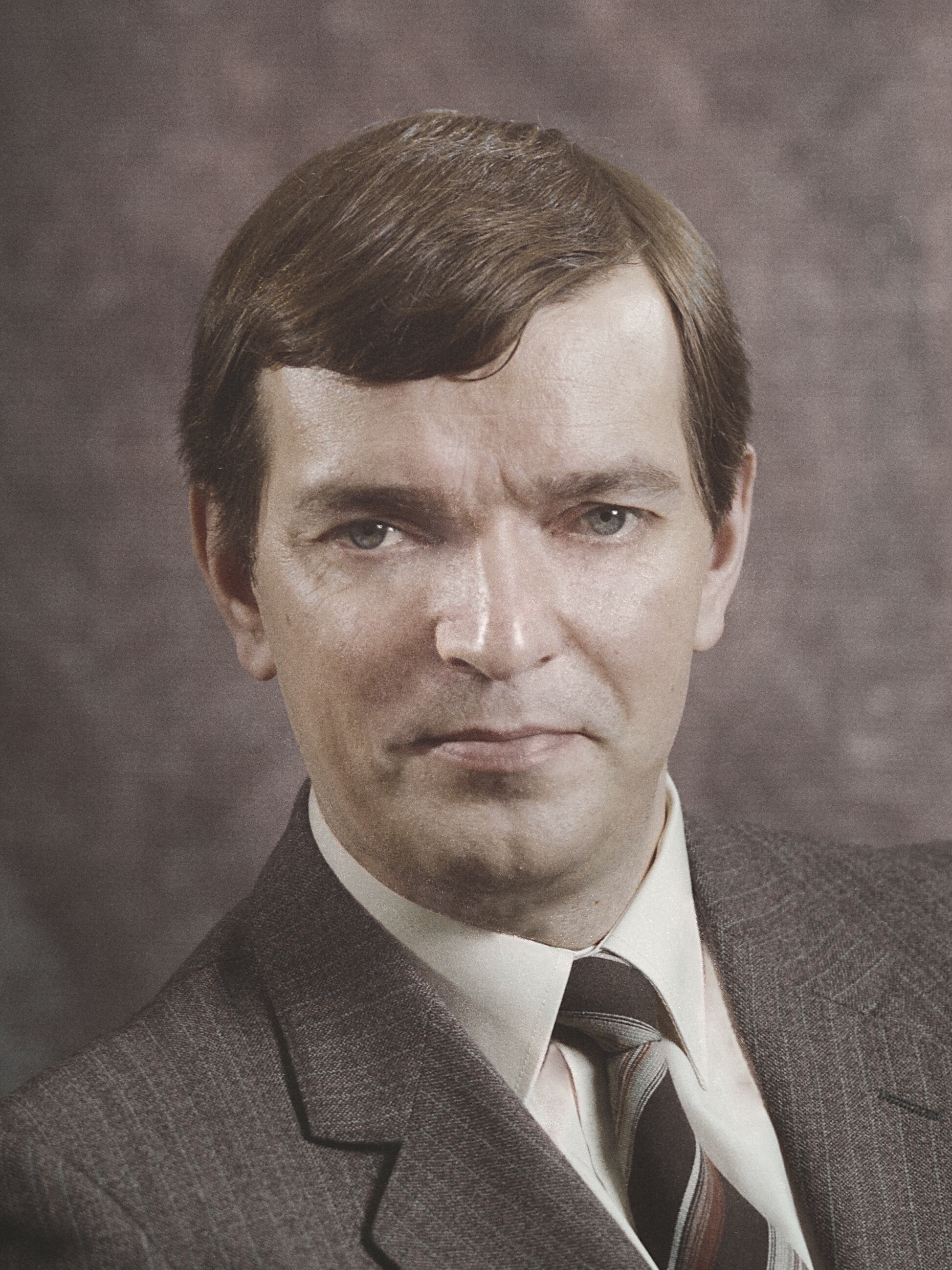

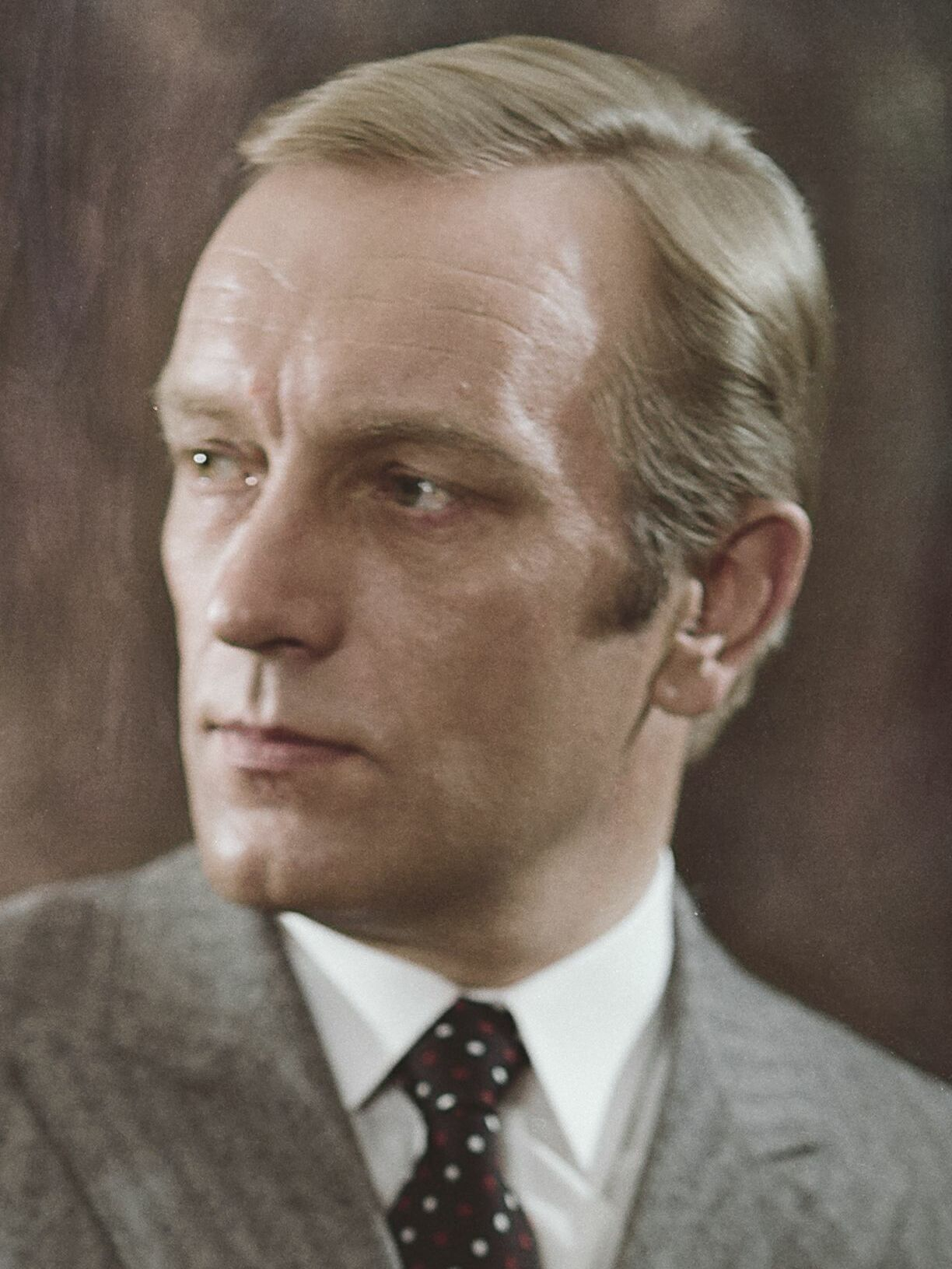

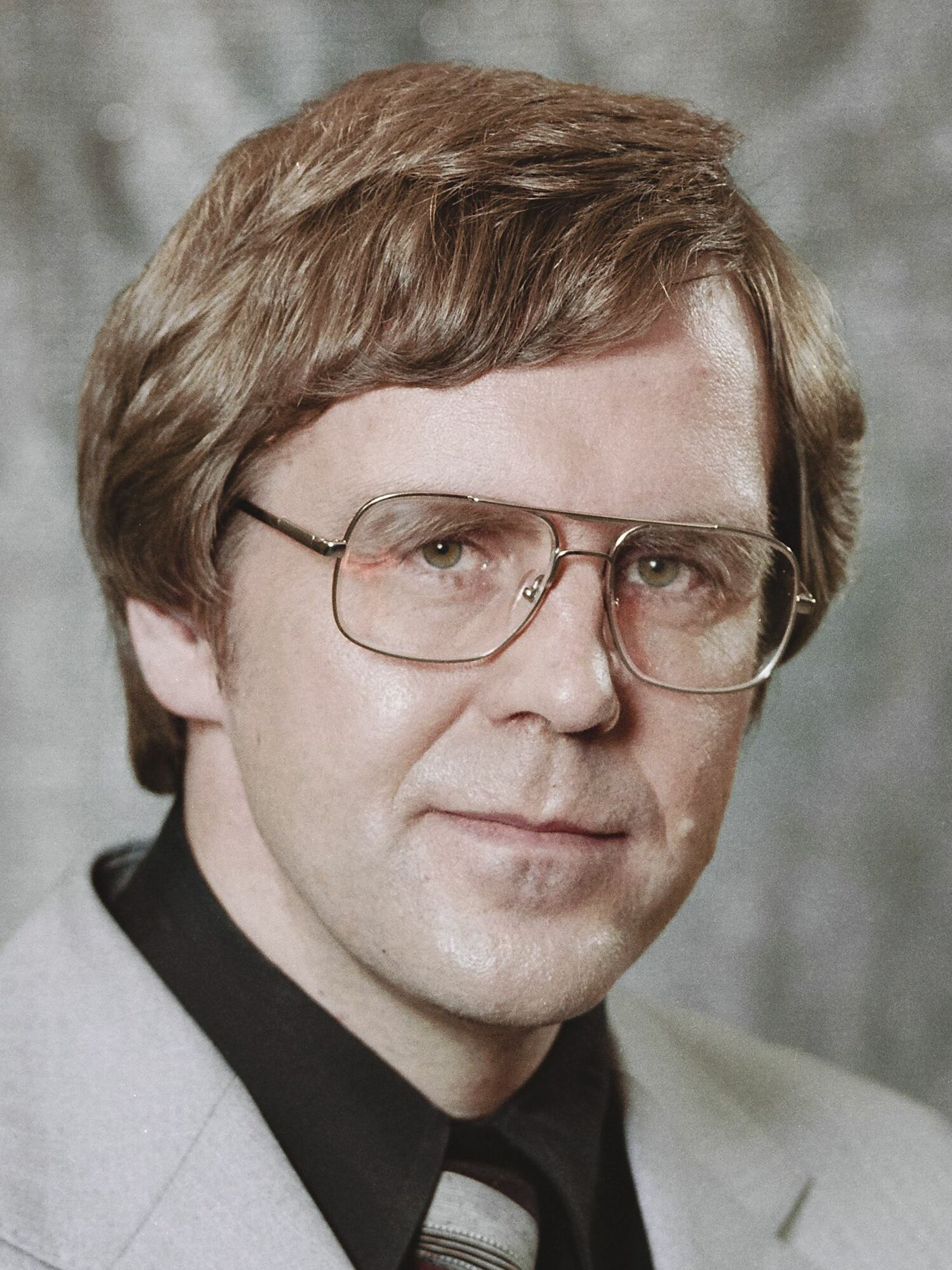
Candidate	Mauno Koivisto	Paavo Väyrynen
Party	SDP	Centre
Electoral vote	189	68
Popular vote	1,513,234 (Pres.); 1,391,399 (EC)	636,375 (Pres.); 647,769 (EC)
Candidate	Harri Holkeri	Kalevi Kivistö
Party	National Coalition	Movement 88
Electoral vote	18	26
Popular vote	570,340 (Pres.); 603,180 (EC)	330,072 (Pres.); 286,833 (EC)
- Presidential electors chosen by constituency
President before election
Mauno Koivisto
SDP
Elected President
Mauno Koivisto
SDP

Presidential elections were held in Finland in 1988. They were the first elections held under a new system. Previously, the public had elected an electoral college that in turn elected the President. For this election, the public directly elected the President on 31 January and 1 February, but also elected an electoral college that would elect the President if no candidate won over 50% of the popular vote. The college was increased in size from 300 to 301 seats to make a tie less likely, though this was still technically possible, as electors could abstain from voting.

The contest's outcome, the re-election of Mauno Koivisto, surprised no one, yet he captured a smaller portion of the direct popular vote than expected—only 48.9 percent, rather than the 60 to 70 percent forecast by opinion polls during 1987. His failure to win more than half of the direct, or popular, vote with an 84 percent turnout meant that Koivisto could claim victory only after he had the support of a majority of the 301-member electoral college. This he achieved on the body's second ballot, when the votes of 45 of the 63 electors pledged to the National Coalition Party (KOK) candidate, Prime Minister Harri Holkeri, were added to those of the 144 electors he had won on his own. Koivisto's inability to win the presidency directly was caused by an upsurge of support in the final weeks of the campaign for his stronger rivals, Centre Party's Paavo Väyrynen and the KOK's Holkeri—who got 20.1 and 18.1 percent of the vote respectively, and Kalevi Kivistö, the candidate of voters linked to the Finnish People's Democratic League (SKDL) and the Greens, who got 10.4 percent. The strong finish of Väyrynen and Kivistö was regarded by some as a vote against the KOK-SDP coalition formed after the March 1987 parliamentary election.

== Campaign ==
The campaign did not center, to any significant degree, on issues, but on the candidates themselves; Väyrynen and Holkeri both clearly wanted to position themselves well for the presidential election of 1994. Neither had any hope of defeating the ever-popular Koivisto in 1988, and it was widely assumed that he would not seek re-election again in 1994. Väyrynen was seen as the winner of this race for position, in that he had come from far behind in the polls, had easily beaten Koivisto in the northern provinces, had found good support elsewhere—except in the Helsinki area, and had cemented his leadership role in his own party. His strong party base and his ability to attract conservatives dissatisfied with their party's alliance with the socialists, combined with his extensive ministerial experience, made the relatively young Väyrynen Finland's foremost opposition politician. His strong finish, and the lack of any SDP politician of Koivisto's personal stature and popularity, guaranteed the Centre Party's continued significance in the country's political life even when in opposition, and were perhaps signs that the dominance of postindustrial southern Finland over the country as a whole might only be temporary.

== Results ==
=== Popular vote ===
==== President ====
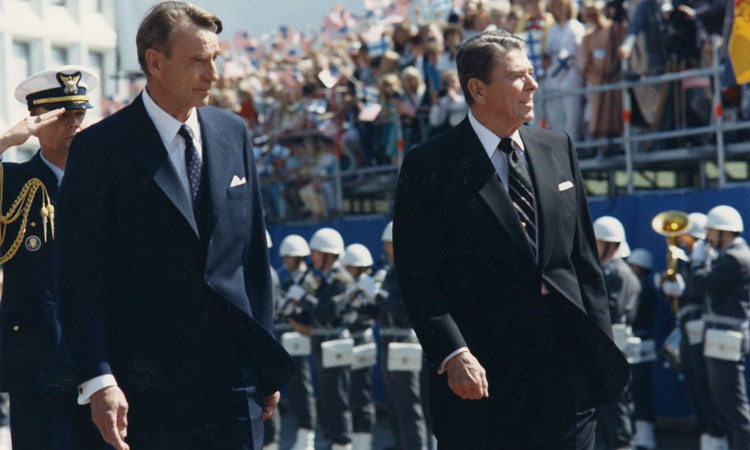
After the Finnish presidential election in the same year President Mauno Koivisto and President Ronald Reagan meeting in Helsinki

Candidate	Party	Votes	%
Mauno Koivisto	Social Democratic Party	1,513,234	48.90
Paavo Väyrynen	Centre Party	636,375	20.57
Harri Holkeri	National Coalition Party	570,340	18.43
Kalevi Kivistö	Movement 88	330,072	10.67
Jouko Kajanoja	Democratic Alternative	44,428	1.44
Total		3,094,449	100.00
Valid votes		3,094,449	97.98
Invalid/blank votes		63,641	2.02
Total votes		3,158,090	100.00
Registered voters/turnout		4,036,169	78.24
Source: Nohlen & Stöver

==== Electoral college ====
Party or alliance		Votes	%	Seats
Supporters of Mauno Koivisto	Social Democratic Party	1,175,209	39.36	128
Supporters of Mauno Koivisto	Finnish Rural Party	120,043	4.02	7
Supporters of Mauno Koivisto	Pro Koivisto	88,663	2.97	8
Supporters of Mauno Koivisto	Åland Coalition	7,484	0.25	1
Supporters of Mauno Koivisto	Total	1,391,399	46.60	144
Centre Party		647,769	21.70	68
National Coalition Party		603,180	20.20	63
Movement 88		286,833	9.61	26
Democratic Alternative		56,528	1.89	0
Total		2,985,709	100.00	301
Valid votes		2,985,709	95.05	
Invalid/blank votes		155,651	4.95	
Total votes		3,141,360	100.00	
Registered voters/turnout		4,036,169	77.83	
Source: Nohlen & Stöver, Tilastokeskus

=== Electoral college vote ===
Candidate	Party	First round		Second round	
Candidate	Party	Votes	%	Votes	%
Mauno Koivisto	Social Democratic Party	144	47.84	189	62.79
Paavo Väyrynen	Centre Party	68	22.59	68	22.59
Harri Holkeri	National Coalition Party	63	20.93	18	5.98
Kalevi Kivistö	Movement 88	26	8.64	26	8.64
Jouko Kajanoja	Democratic Alternative	0	0.00		
Total		301	100.00	301	100.00
Source: Nohlen & Stöver
