= Mauno Koivisto =

Finnish politician, President of Finland (1923–2017)

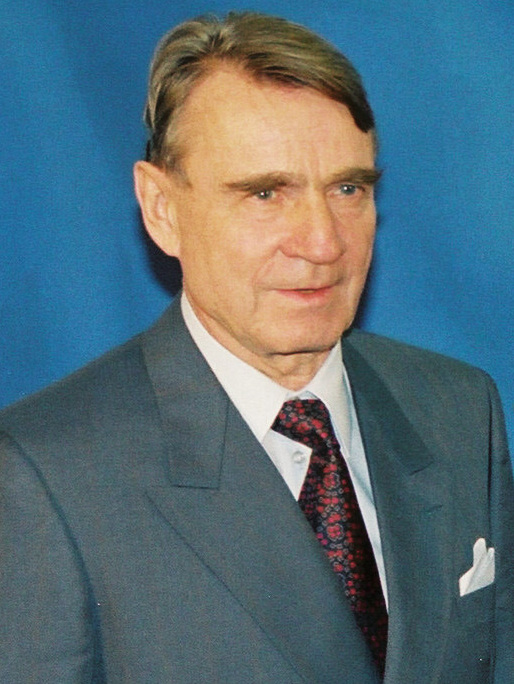
- Koivisto in 1992

9th President of Finland
- In office 27 January 1982 – 1 March 1994
- Prime Minister: Kalevi Sorsa; Harri Holkeri; Esko Aho
- Preceded by: Urho Kekkonen
- Succeeded by: Martti Ahtisaari

32nd Prime Minister of Finland
- In office 26 May 1979 – 26 January 1982
- President: Urho Kekkonen
- Deputy: Eino Uusitalo
- Preceded by: Kalevi Sorsa
- Succeeded by: Kalevi Sorsa
- In office 22 March 1968 – 14 May 1970
- President: Urho Kekkonen
- Deputy: Johannes Virolainen
- Preceded by: Rafael Paasio
- Succeeded by: Teuvo Aura

Deputy Prime Minister of Finland
- In office 23 February 1972 – 4 September 1972
- Prime Minister: Rafael Paasio
- Preceded by: Päiviö Hetemäki
- Succeeded by: Ahti Karjalainen

Minister of Finance
- In office 23 February 1972 – 4 September 1972
- Prime Minister: Rafael Paasio
- Preceded by: Päiviö Hetemäki
- Succeeded by: Johannes Virolainen
- In office 27 May 1966 – 31 December 1967
- Prime Minister: Rafael Paasio
- Preceded by: Esa Kaitila
- Succeeded by: Eino Raunio

Personal details
- Born: Mauno Henrik Koivisto; 25 November 1923 Turku, Finland
- Died: 12 May 2017 (aged 93) Helsinki, Finland
- Resting place: Hietaniemi Cemetery, Helsinki
- Party: Social Democratic
- Spouse: Tellervo Kankaanranta (m. 1952)
- Children: 1

Military service
- Branch/service: Finnish Army
- Years of service: 1939–1944
- Rank: Corporal
- Battles/wars: World War II; Winter War; Continuation War

Mauno Henrik Koivisto (Note: Finnish pronunciation: [ˈmɑu̯no ˈhenrik ˈkoi̯ʋisto]) (25 November 1923 – 12 May 2017) was a Finnish politician who served as the president of Finland from 1982 to 1994. He also served as the country's prime minister twice, from 1968 to 1970 and again from 1979 to 1982. He was also the first member of the Social Democratic Party to be elected as President of Finland.

== Early life ==
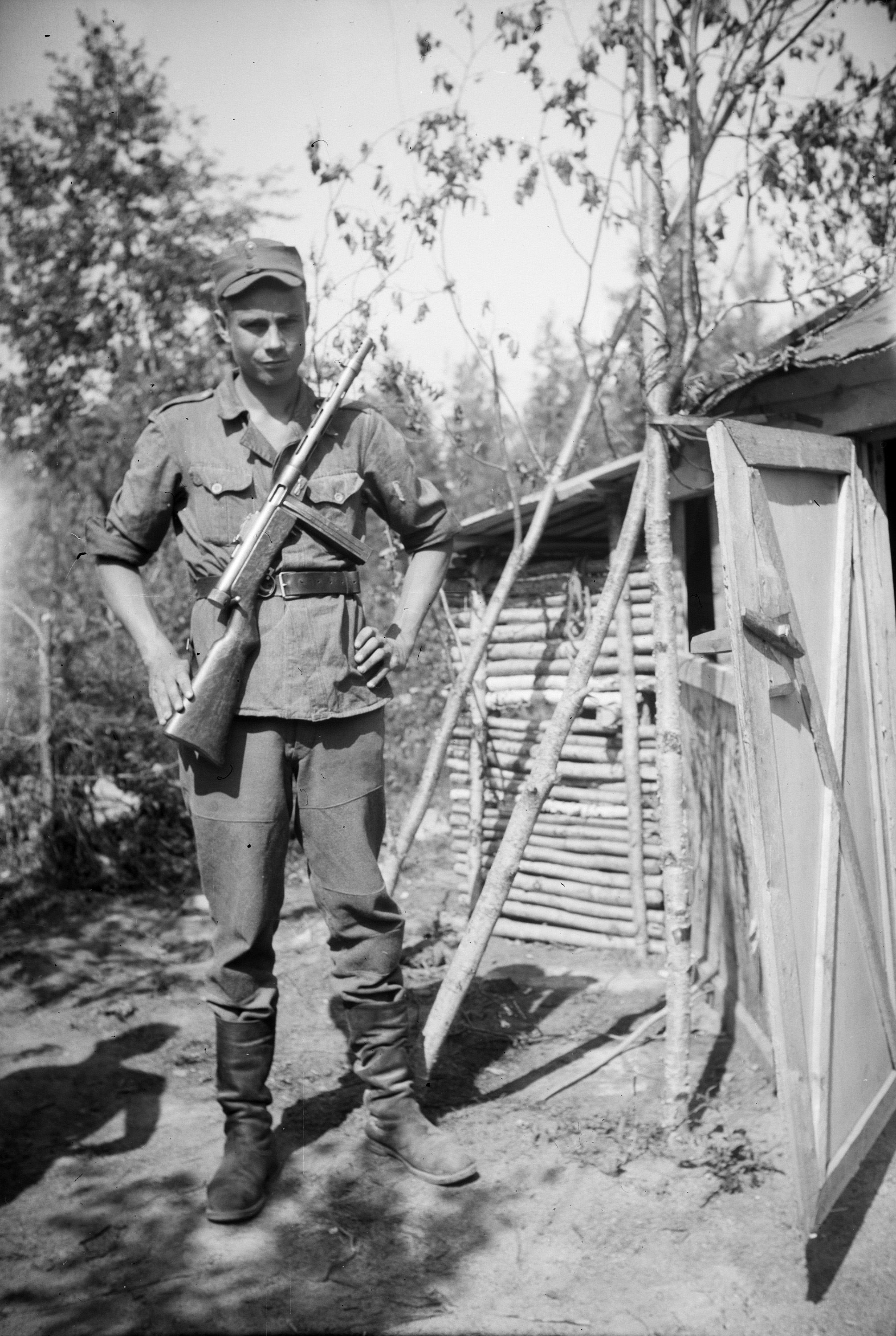
Young Mauno Koivisto was one of soldiers led by legendary Lauri Törni during the Continuation War.

Koivisto was born in Turku as the second son of Juho Koivisto, a carpenter at Crichton-Vulcan shipyard, and Hymni Sofia Eskola, who died when he was 10. After attending primary school, Koivisto worked a number of jobs, and at the beginning of the Winter War in 1939 joined a field firefighting unit at the age of 16. During the Continuation War, Koivisto served in the Infantry Detachment Törni led by Lauri Törni, which was a reconnaissance detachment operating behind enemy lines. This detachment was only open to selected volunteers. During the war, he received the Order of the Cross of Liberty (2nd class) and was promoted to the rank of corporal. While reflecting on his wartime experiences later in life, he said "When you have taken part in a game in which your own life is at stake, all other games are small after that".

After the war, he earned a living as a carpenter and became active in politics, joining the Social Democratic Party. During his early years, Koivisto was also influenced by anarchism and anarcho-syndicalism. In 1948, he found work at the port of Turku. In December 1948, he was appointed the manager of the Harbour Labour Office of Turku, a post he held until 1951. In 1949, communist-controlled trade unions attempted to topple Karl-August Fagerholm's social democratic minority government, and the Social Democratic leadership of the Finnish Confederation of Trade Unions (SAK) declared the port of Hanko an "open site", urging port workers who supported legality to go there. Koivisto went to Hanko to take charge of the harbour-master's office and recruit workers to break the strike, the government having banned strike action. The Communist newspapers branded Koivisto as their number one enemy due to his status as a major figure in the struggle for control of the trade unions.

== Career ==
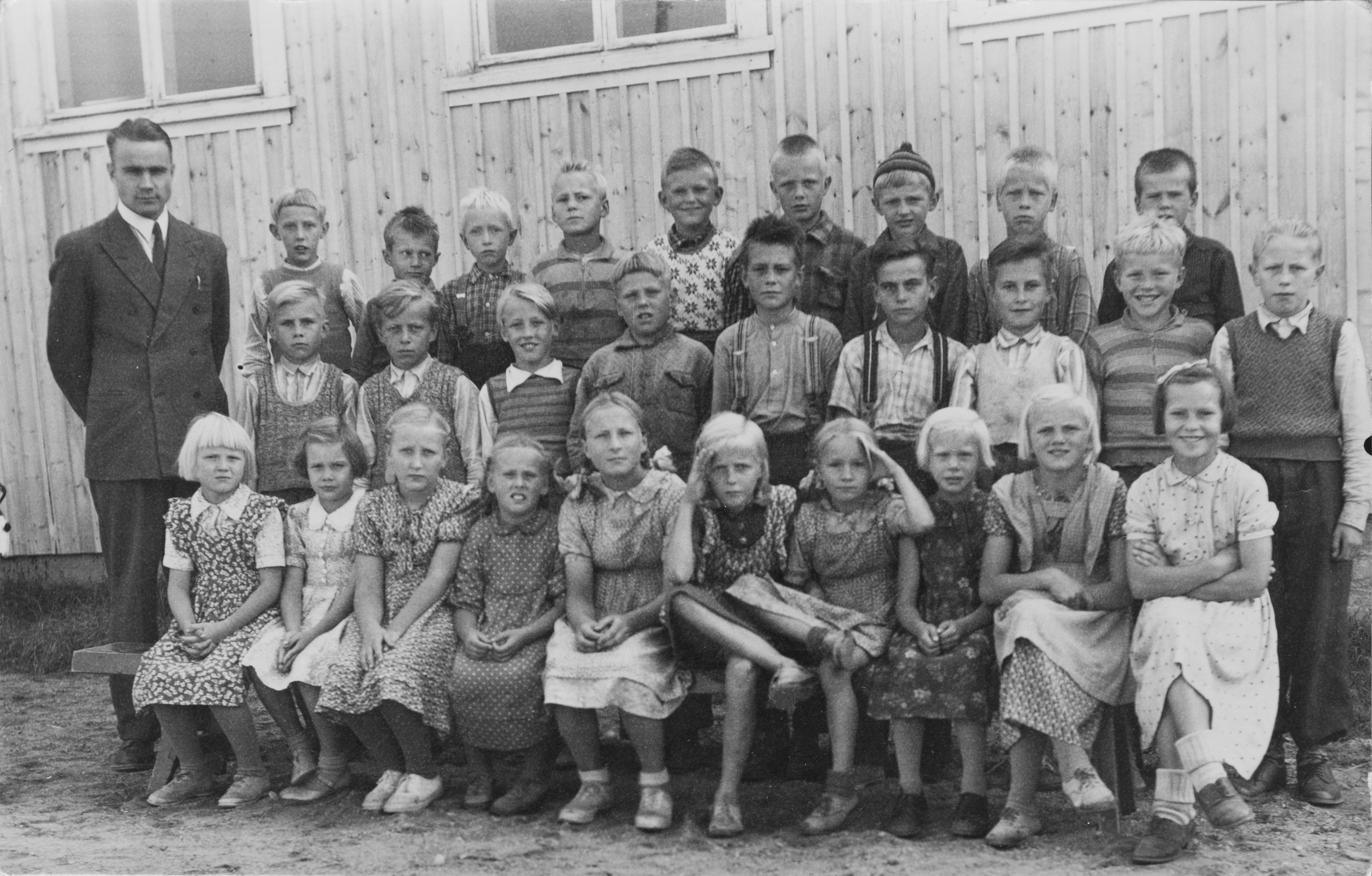
Mauno Koivisto as a teacher with students in a 1950s classroom photo taken at the Saaristopiiri School in Eurajoki

In addition to his political engagements and ongoing career, Koivisto continued with his education, passing his intermediate examination in 1947 and his university entrance examination in 1949. In 1951, he became a primary school teacher. On 22 June 1952, he married Tellervo Kankaanranta. Together they had a daughter, Assi Koivisto, who was later voted to the electoral college during the 1982 presidential election. Koivisto graduated from the University of Turku with a Master of Arts degree and a licentiate in 1953, and had plans to become a sociologist. Three years later he completed his doctoral thesis, which examined social relations in the Turku dockyards. Koivisto also served as Vocational Counselor for the City of Turku, and as a member of the Turku City Council.

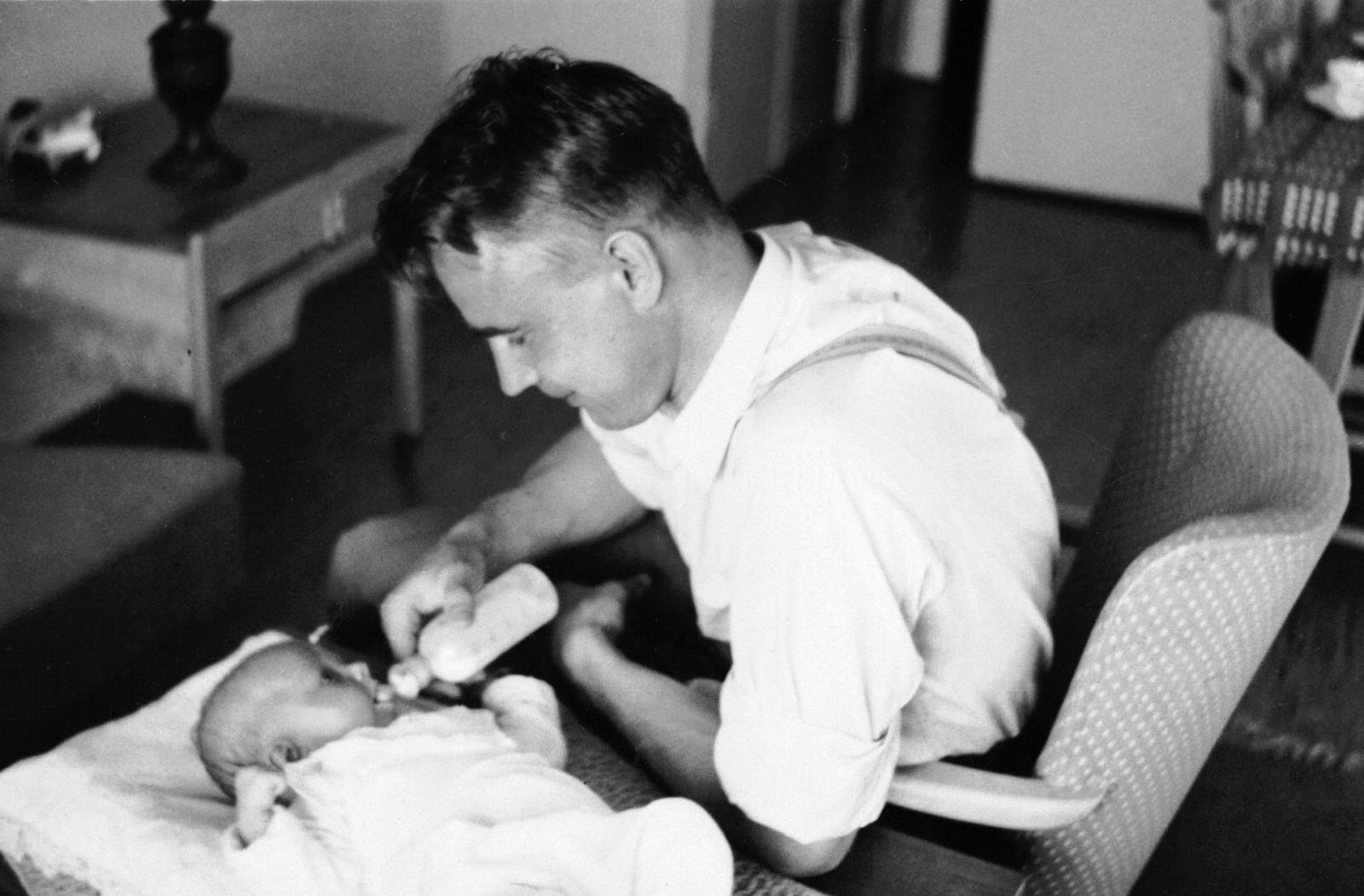
Mauno Koivisto and daughter Assi in 1957

In 1957, he started working for the Helsinki Workers' Savings Bank and served as its general manager from 1959 to 1968. In 1968, he was appointed as the chairman of the board (governor) at the Bank of Finland, a position he held until 1982. During the 1960s, he witnessed a number of internal schisms within the Social Democratic Party, and made efforts to improve the party's relationships with both the communists and with President Urho Kekkonen.

== Political career ==
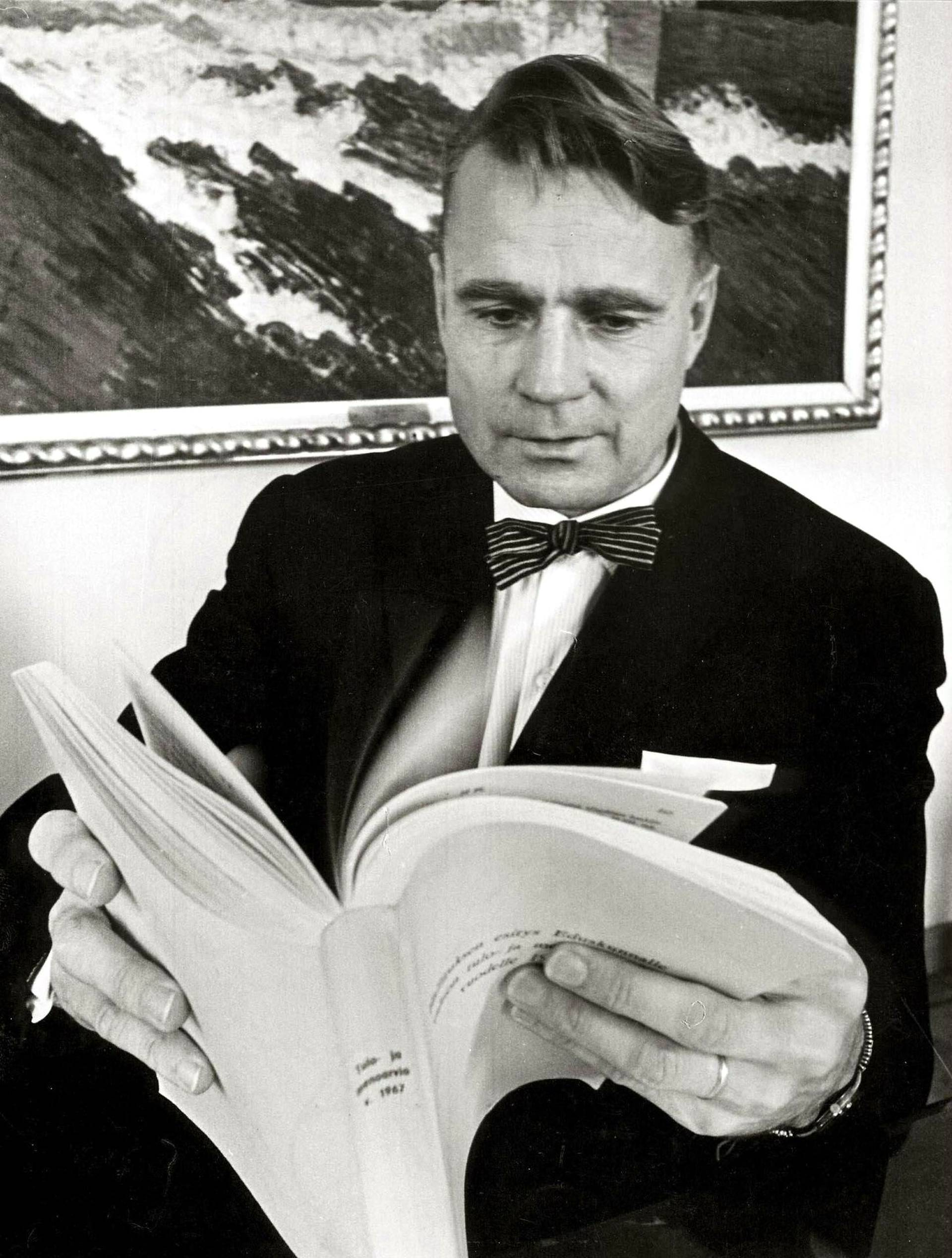
Minister of Finance Koivisto reads the 1967 draft revenue and expenditure estimate.

The 1966 parliamentary election's Social Democratic victory saw the formation of a government under Prime Minister Rafael Paasio, with Koivisto, the party's expert on economic policy, assuming the role of the Minister of Finance. By the beginning of 1968, many SDP members had become disillusioned with Paasio's leadership style, and Koivisto emerged as the chief candidate to succeed Paasio as prime minister. Koivisto became the prime minister of his first government, the Koivisto I Cabinet, on 22 March 1968. He served as prime minister for two years until the 1970 parliamentary election, which saw the other parties in the coalition government—Centre, SKDL, SPP, and TPSL—suffer heavy losses, bringing about Koivisto's resignation.

In the 1970s, President Kekkonen started to regard Koivisto as a potential rival. To counter this, he threw his weight behind Koivisto's Social Democratic colleague, Kalevi Sorsa. For most of the decade, Koivisto concentrated on his work as the chairman of the Bank of Finland. The 1979 election saw him return as prime minister, forming a coalition government between the SDP, Centre, SPP, and SKDL. By this point there was increasing dissatisfaction with the aging President Kekkonen, whose failing health was becoming difficult to conceal, and also a perceived lack of change. As prime minister and chairman of the Bank of Finland who enjoyed high ratings in opinion polls, Koivisto began to be seen as a likely future candidate for the presidency.

In early 1981, President Kekkonen began to regret Koivisto's appointment as prime minister and started to offer support to those who wanted to get rid of him. In the spring of 1981, members of Centre, which was serving as part of the government coalition, launched a behind-the-scenes attempt to bring down the government through a parliamentary motion of no confidence, so that Koivisto would not be able to conduct a presidential election campaign from the position of Prime Minister. At the critical moment Koivisto managed to gain the support of the SKDL. He was thus able to call Kekkonen's bluff by refusing to tender his resignation, reminding Kekkonen that the prime minister and Cabinet were responsible to Parliament, not the president. This would have been unthinkable for most of Kekkonen's quarter-century in office, but by then Kekkonen no longer had the energy to topple the government.

Finnish historians, political scientists, and journalists still debate whether Kekkonen really wanted to dismiss Koivisto or whether Kekkonen simply wanted to speed up Koivisto's slow and ponderous decision-making. Some question whether this government crisis was just a part of the ruthless "presidential game" that top politicians such as Koivisto and Social Democratic chairman Sorsa were playing with one another. By October 1981, it became apparent that Kekkonen was too ill to carry out his duties, and he announced he would not run again. He resigned soon afterward, making Koivisto acting president. Koivisto was able to launch his presidential election campaign from the position.

During the campaign, Koivisto was questioned particularly thoroughly on two issues: the nature of his socialism and his relations to the Soviet Union. Describing the nature of his socialism, he referred to Eduard Bernstein, a revisionist social democrat, saying: "The important thing is the movement, not the goal." To a journalist's question, intended to be a difficult one, on the issue of relations with the Soviet Union, Koivisto replied that they were nothing to boast about; this answer increased his popularity. Koivisto did not want to be elected with the support of the Soviet Union.

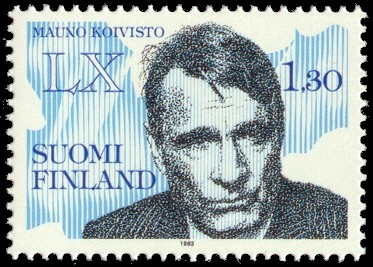
Koivisto postage stamp from 1983

The voter turnout in the presidential elections was nearly 90%. Koivisto's wife and daughter were among the members of the electoral college. Koivisto won 167 of the 301 votes of the electoral college in the first round; his closest competitor, NCP candidate Harri Holkeri, received 58. As a result, Koivisto became Finland's first socialist president. His victory completed a long process of integrating the Social Democrats into Finland's political life, dating back to the Civil War.

== Presidency (1982–1994) ==
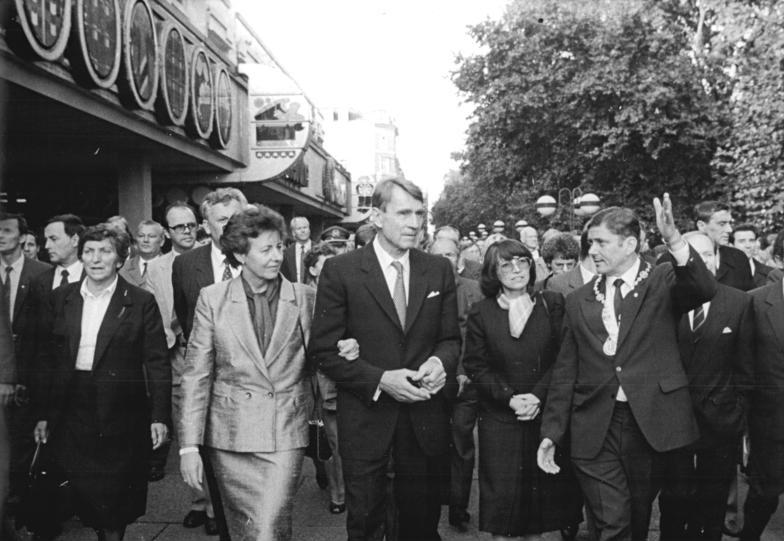
President Mauno Koivisto and Tellervo Koivisto visiting Dresden, East Germany, 1987

As president, Koivisto kept a low profile and used less authoritarian leadership tactics than Kekkonen had employed, refraining from using some of his presidential powers and initiating a new era of parliamentarianism in Finland. On the other hand, he had an occasionally difficult relationship with journalists, which he famously called "lemmings". One practical problem that quite a few reporters had with Koivisto's statements was their deeply pondering and philosophical nature.

Mauno Koivisto's presidency (1982–1994) marked a deliberate shift from the strong presidential dominance of his predecessor, Urho Kekkonen, towards a more parliament-centered governance. He consciously limited the exercise of presidential powers, fostering an environment where the Prime Minister and Parliament assumed greater responsibility in decision-making processes.

Koivisto also supported constitutional reforms aimed at reducing presidential authority, thereby strengthening Finland's parliamentary system. This transition contributed to a more balanced distribution of power within the Finnish government, aligning with his commitment to democratic principles.

Those statements were not often easy to interpret, unlike Kekkonen's blunt and sometimes harsh statements. As the leader of Finland's foreign policies he initially continued Kekkonen's line until the collapse of the Soviet Union. He also continued the established practice of returning Soviet defectors to the Soviet Union, a custom now prohibited as a human rights violation by the Finnish constitution.

Koivisto created close contacts with Mikhail Gorbachev, George H. W. Bush, and Ronald Reagan. He carried on private correspondence with Gorbachev and Bush. His ties to the other Nordic countries and Nordic colleagues were very close and trustworthy. He spoke fluent Russian, Swedish, English, and German.

In the critical moments during which the Soviet Union was collapsing, and the Baltic countries, particularly Estonia, were declaring themselves independent, Koivisto referred to the policy of neutrality and avoided publicly supporting the Baltic independence movement, but its members were allowed to work from Finland. Koivisto's Finland recognized the new Estonian government only after the major powers had done so. Koivisto did however covertly send money to Estonia to assist their independence movement.

Koivisto made two bold unilateral diplomatic moves that significantly changed the Finnish political position. In 1990, after the reunification of Germany, Koivisto unilaterally renounced the terms of the Paris Peace Treaties which limited the strength and armament of the Finnish Defence Forces. The rationale was that after Germany had been given its full rights as a sovereign state, Finland could not remain bound by the antiquated treaty. The renunciation caused no official protest from Soviet Union or Great Britain. The other major move was the renunciation of the Finno-Soviet Treaty (Finnish: YYA-sopimus) in 1991, concurrently with the fall of Soviet Union. The treaty, the military article of which had shaped Finnish foreign policy for decades, was substituted with a new treaty without military obligations in the next year.

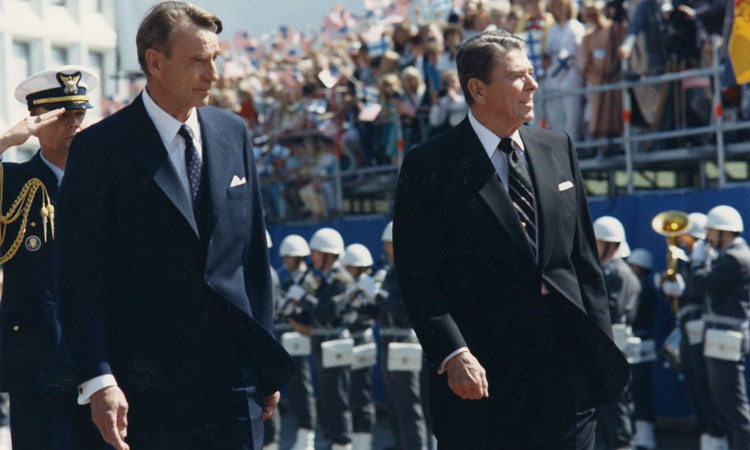
Koivisto and Ronald Reagan, Helsinki, in 1988

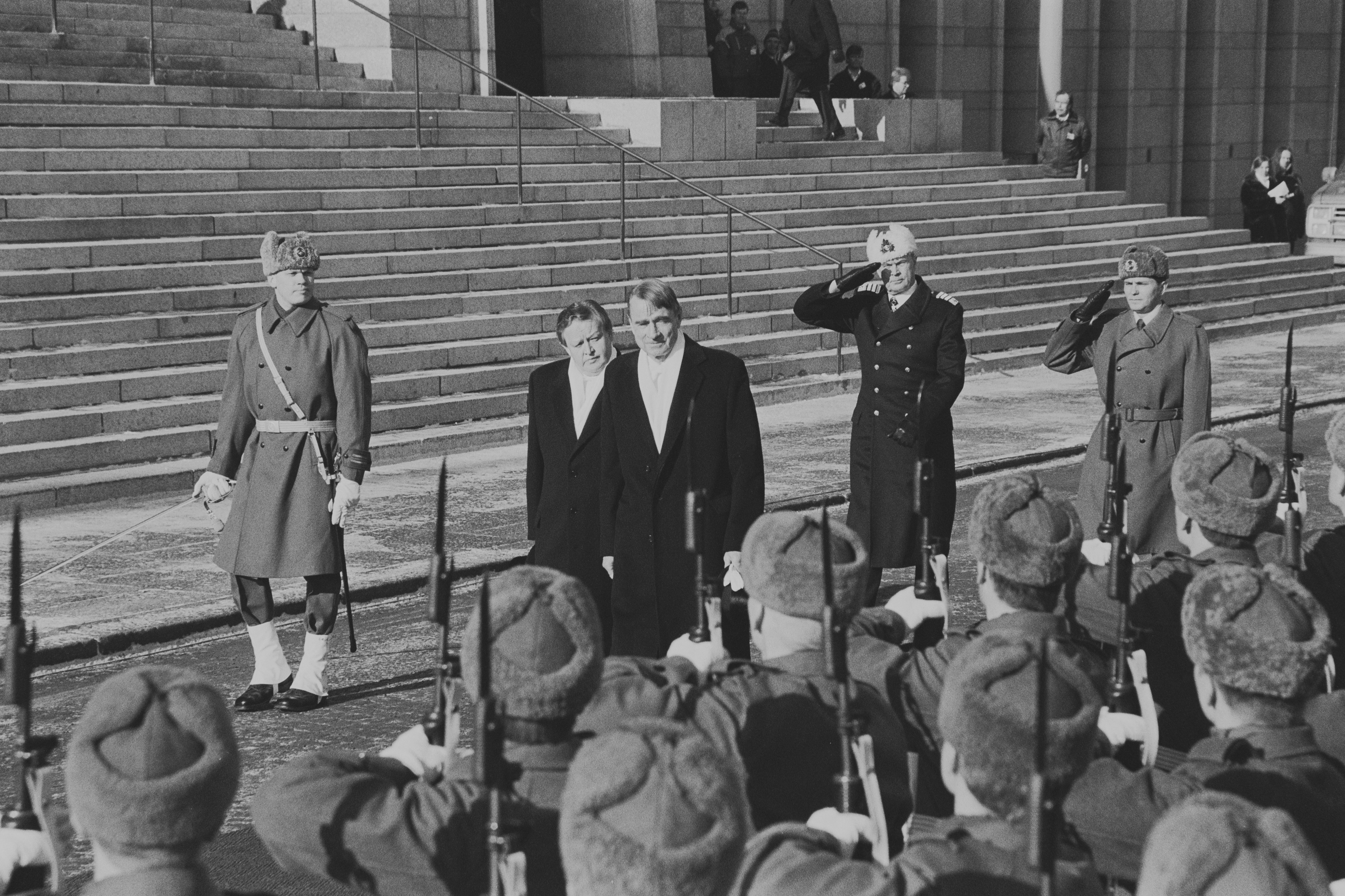
President Martti Ahtisaari inspects a company of honor followed by, among others, the outgoing President Mauno Koivisto in 1994.

In 1990, partly motivated by nationalism, partly by the fear of the declining work force, Koivisto proposed that any Soviet citizen with either Finnish or Ingrian ancestry be enabled to immigrate to Finland as a returnee. The proposal resulted in a modification of immigration laws to this end during the year.

After the Soviet Union collapsed, Koivisto was against seeking the return of formerly Finnish parts of Karelia to Finland.

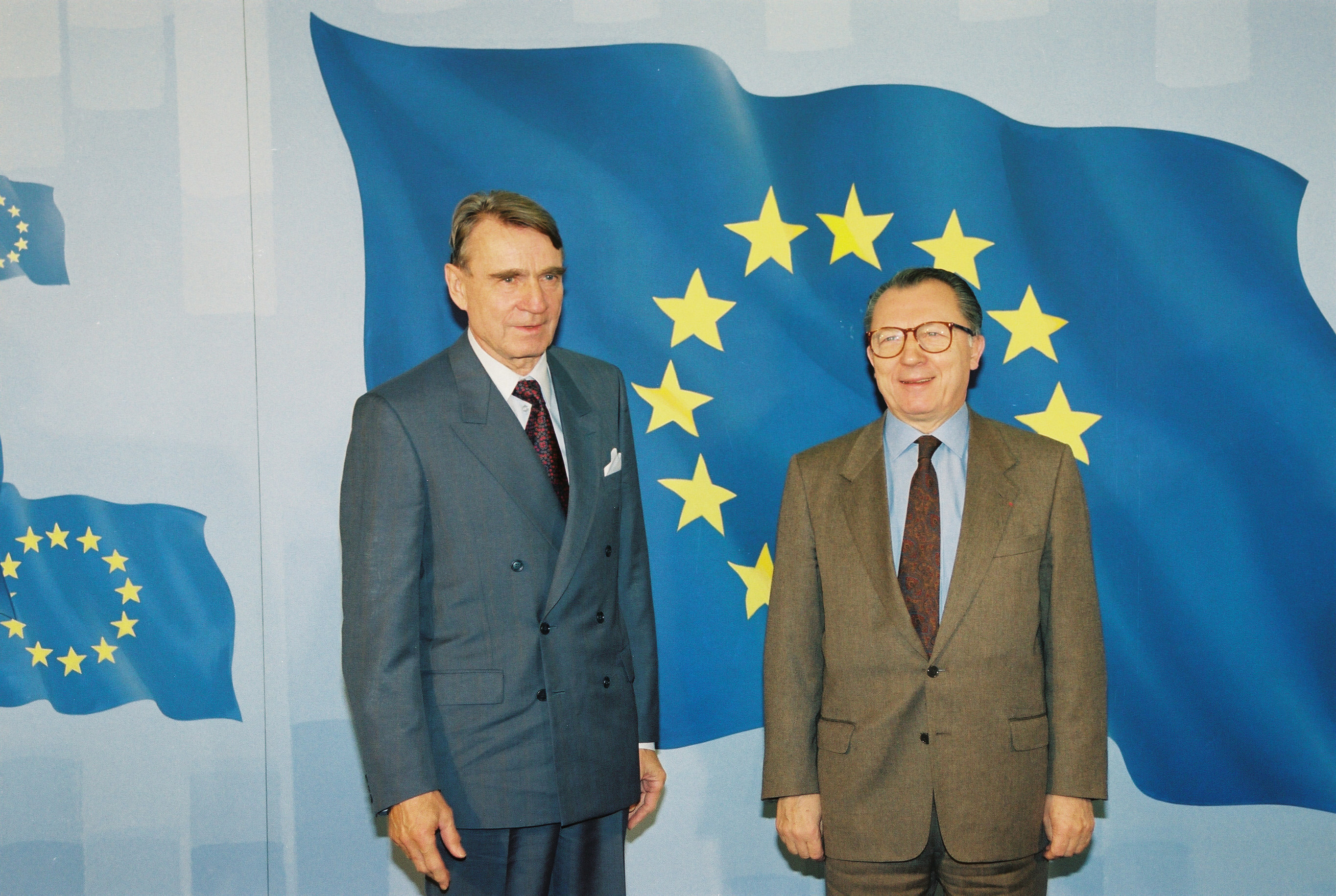
Koivisto with President of the European Commission Jacques Delors in Brussels, 29 October 1992

In the 1988 presidential election, Koivisto was re-elected with 189 out of 301 votes in the electoral college during the second round. After the collapse of the Soviet Union, he supported more radical ideals like joining the European Union. In 1992, Koivisto initiated the process of Finnish accession to the European community. The final terms of the membership agreement were finalised on the day of Koivisto's departure from the presidency. He was succeeded by President Martti Ahtisaari, who was also a supporter of EU membership.

Koivisto's popularity sharply declined during Finland's economic depression of the early 1990s, because many unemployed or otherwise impoverished citizens believed that he could have forced the centre-right government of Esko Aho to stimulate the economy and grant unemployed people temporary public sector jobs.

Koivisto's term ended in 1994. Henceforth he published his memoirs in four volumes and continued as a commentator on economics and both domestic and international politics.

== Post-presidency ==
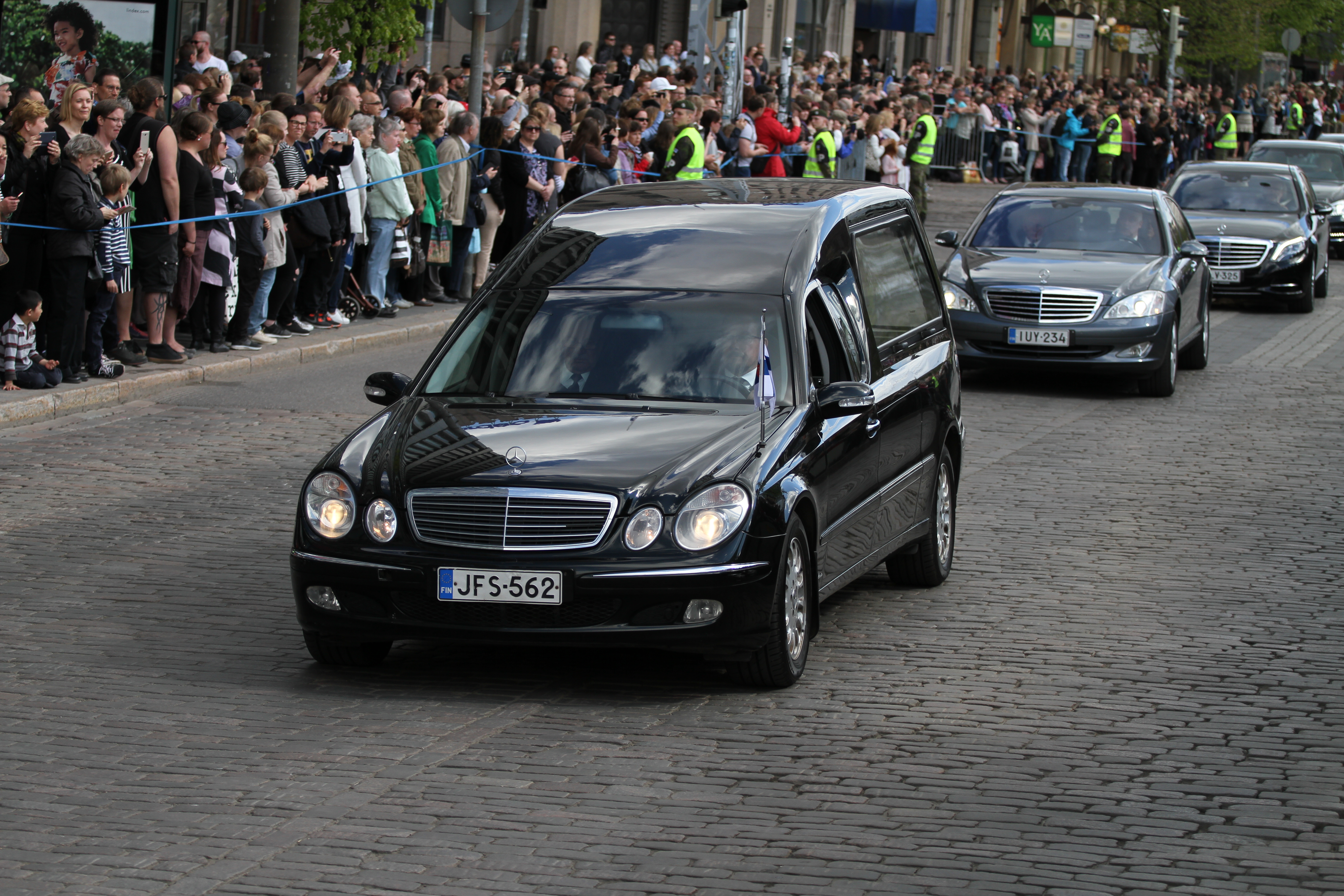
The funeral cortege of Mauno Koivisto on 25 May 2017 in Helsinki

Subsequent to his presidency, Koivisto occasionally continued to represent Finland officially abroad, most notably at the funerals of Queen Ingrid of Denmark in 2000, Queen Elizabeth The Queen Mother in 2002 and Ronald Reagan in 2004.

In 2009, Koivisto declined to apologize to Estonia that his administration did not support the country's independence movement.

On 3 March 2010, he was hospitalized for cardiac dysrhythmia but was released less than a week later.

=== Hobby ===
Volleyball was Koivisto's long-standing hobby. His volleyball hobby began when he was in his twenties and continued until retirement.

=== Death ===
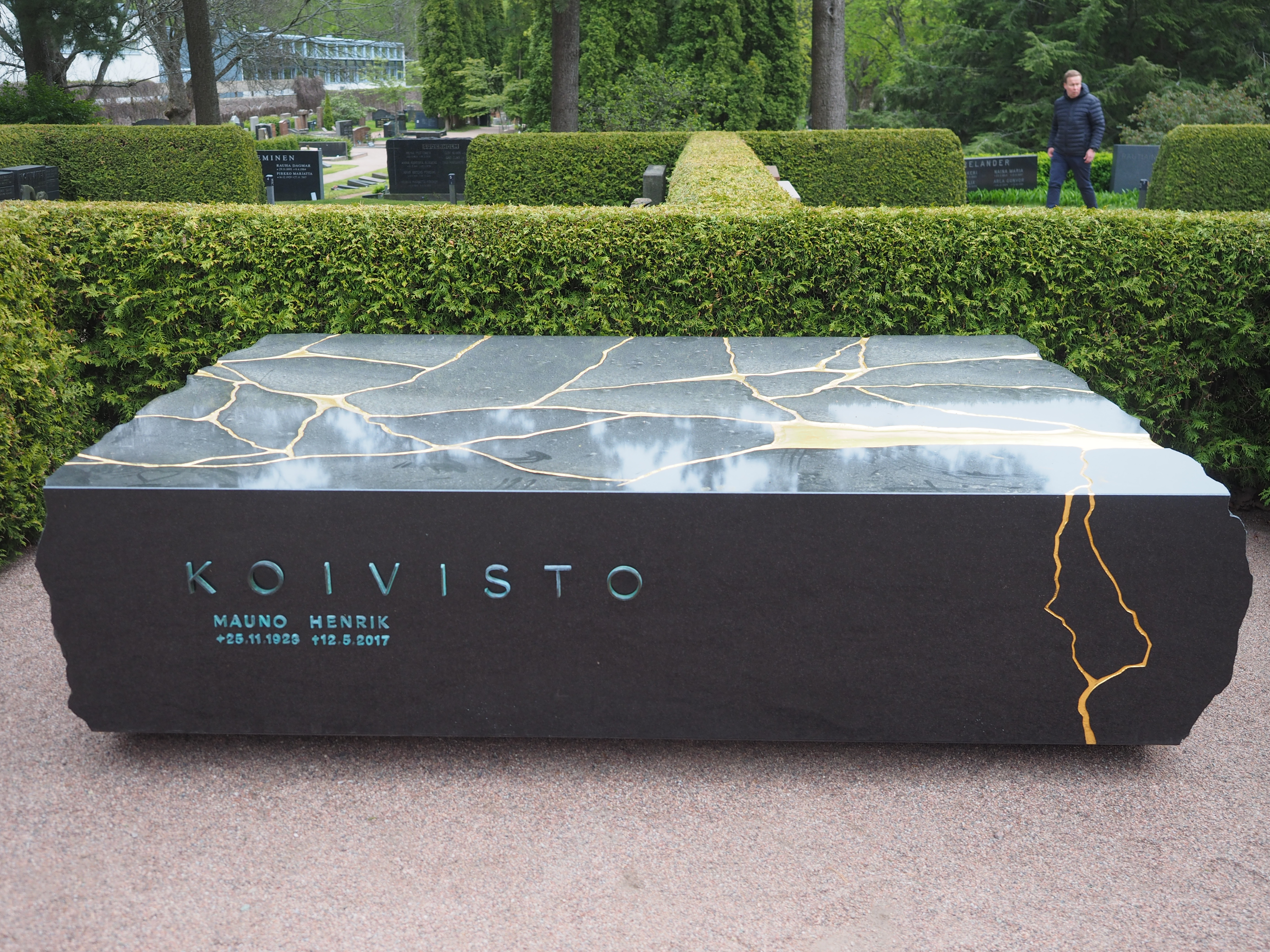
The grave of Mauno Koivisto at the Hietaniemi Cemetery

Koivisto's health deteriorated in December 2016 due to Alzheimer's disease and his wife Tellervo started as his caregiver. In January 2017, Koivisto fell badly at his home and broke his hand, after which he moved to a nursing home. In May 2017, Koivisto was put in end-of-life care. Koivisto died on 12 May 2017, aged 93.

His state funeral was held on 25 May 2017. Koivisto is buried in the Hietaniemi Cemetery in Helsinki.

== Bibliography ==
- Sosiaaliset suhteet Turun satamassa: sosiologinen tutkimus, 1956. doctoral thesis.
- Linjan vetoa, 1968.
- Väärää politiikkaa, 1978. ISBN 951-26-1511-8.
- Tästä lähtien, 1981. ISBN 951-26-2285-8.
- Linjaviitat: Ulkopoliittisia kannanottoja, 1983. ISBN 951-26-2446-X.
- Politiikkaa ja politikointia 1978–81, 1988. ISBN 951-26-3239-X.
- Maantiede ja historiallinen kokemus: Ulkopoliittisia kannanottoja, 1992. ISBN 951-1-12614-8.
- Kaksi kautta, 1994. ISBN 951-26-3947-5.
- Historian tekijät, 1995. ISBN 951-26-4082-1.
- Liikkeen suunta, 1997. ISBN 951-26-4272-7.
- Koulussa ja sodassa, 1998. ISBN 951-26-4384-7.
- Venäjän idea, 2001. ISBN 951-31-2108-9.
- Itsenäiseksi imperiumin kainalossa – mietteitä kansojen kohtaloista, 2004. ISBN 951-31-3181-5.

== Honours ==
Coat of Arms of Mauno Koivisto
- Armiger: Mauno Koivisto
- Adopted: 1983
- Motto: "Valtakunnan parhaaksi" ("For the best of the Realm")

=== Awards and decorations ===
==== National orders ====
- Finland: Grand Cross of the Order of the White Rose
- Finland: Grand Cross of the Order of the Lion of Finland
- Finland: Grand Cross of the Order of the Cross of Liberty
- Finland: Grand Cross of the Order of the Holy Lamb of the Orthodox Church of Finland

==== Foreign orders ====
- Sweden: Knight of the Order of the Seraphim (16 April 1982)
- Norway: Grand Cross of the Order of St. Olav (1983)
- Denmark: Knight of the Order of the Elephant (20 April 1983)
- Iceland: Grand Cross with Collar of the Order of the Falcon & wife: Grand Cross (20 October 1982)
- Estonia: 1st Class Cross of the Order of the Cross of Terra Mariana (20 November 2001)
- Germany: Order of Merit of the Federal Republic of Germany
- Japan: Order of the Chrysanthemum
- Portugal: Collar of the Order of Prince Henry (22 April 1992)
- Italy: Knight Grand Cross with Collar of the Order of Merit of the Italian Republic (14 September 1993)
- France: Legion of Honour
- France: National Order of Merit
- Soviet Union: Order of Lenin
- Luxembourg: Order of the Gold Lion of the House of Nassau
- Poland, People's Republic: Order of the Merit of the People's Republic of Poland
- Poland, Republic: Order of the White Eagle
- Austria: Decoration of Honour for Services to the Republic of Austria
- Bulgaria: Order of Stara Planina
- Nepal: Order of Ojaswi Rajanya
- Jordan: Order of al-Hussein bin Ali
- Hungary, People's Republic: Order of Flag of the People's Republic of Hungary
- Hungary, Republic: Order of Merit of Hungary
- Netherlands: Order of the Netherlands Lion
- Yugoslavia: Order of the Great Yugoslav Star (1986)
- Czechoslovakia: Order of the White Lion (1987)
- San Marino: Order of San Marino
- East Germany: Star of People's Friendship
- Colombia: Order of San Carlos

=== Honorary degrees ===
- Finland: University of Helsinki 1990
- Finland: University of Helsinki 1988
- Czechoslovakia: Charles University in Prague 1987
- Finland: University of Tampere 1985
- France: University of Toulouse 1983
- Finland: Åbo Akademi 1978
- Finland: University of Turku 1977

== See also ==
- List of presidents of Finland

Government offices
Preceded by Klaus Waris	Governor of the Bank of Finland; 1968–1982	Succeeded by Ahti Karjalainen
Political offices
Preceded by Rafael Paasio	Prime Minister of Finland; 1968–1970	Succeeded by Teuvo Aura
Preceded by Kalevi Sorsa	Prime Minister of Finland; 1979–1982	Succeeded by Kalevi Sorsa
Preceded by Urho Kekkonen	President of Finland; 1982–1994	Succeeded by Martti Ahtisaari
