= 1982 Finnish presidential election =

← 1978	17–18 January 1982	1988 →
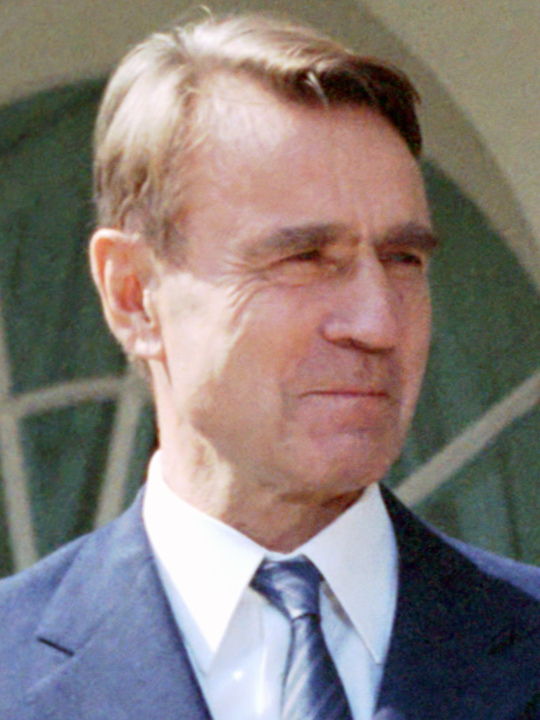

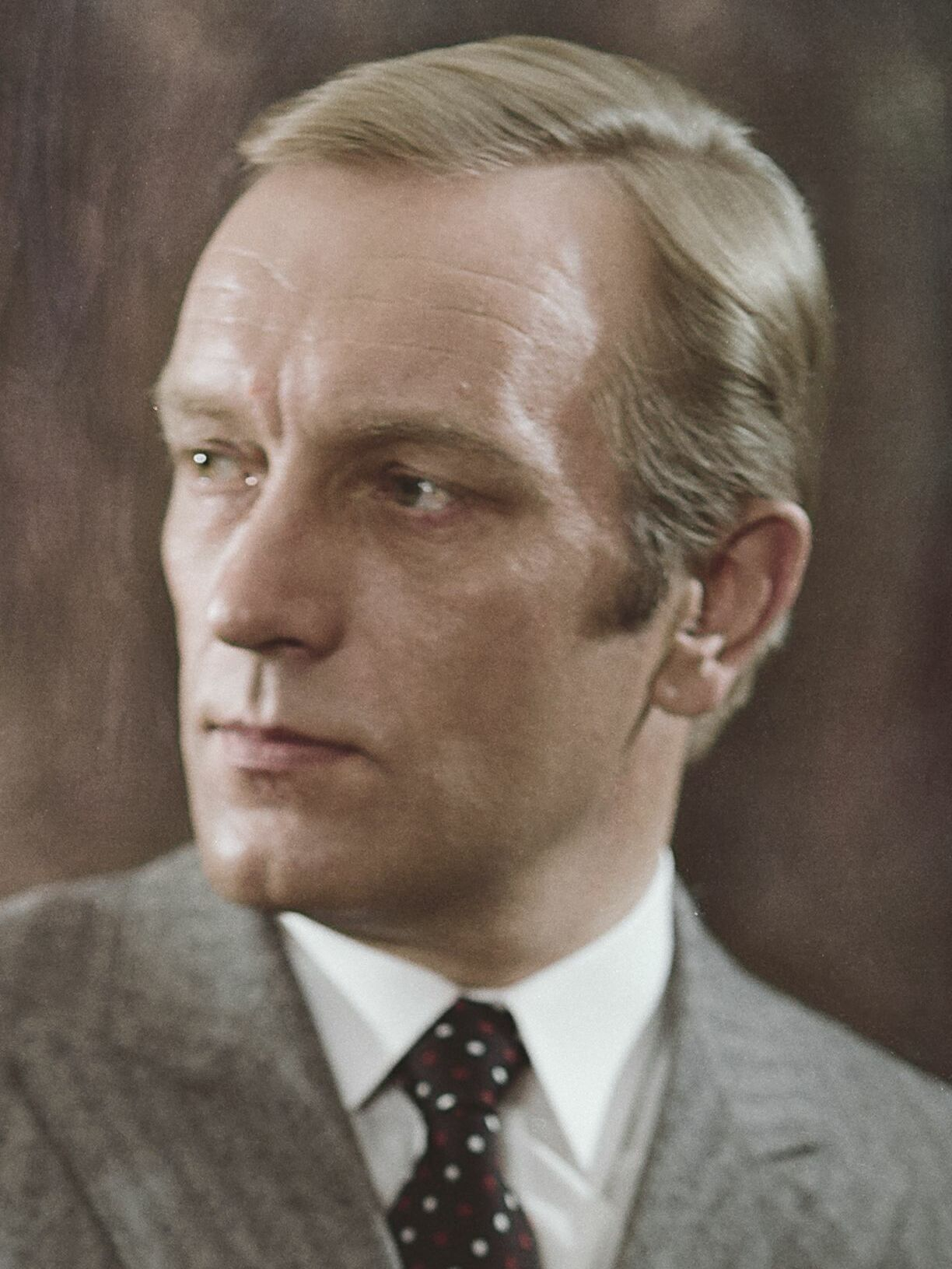

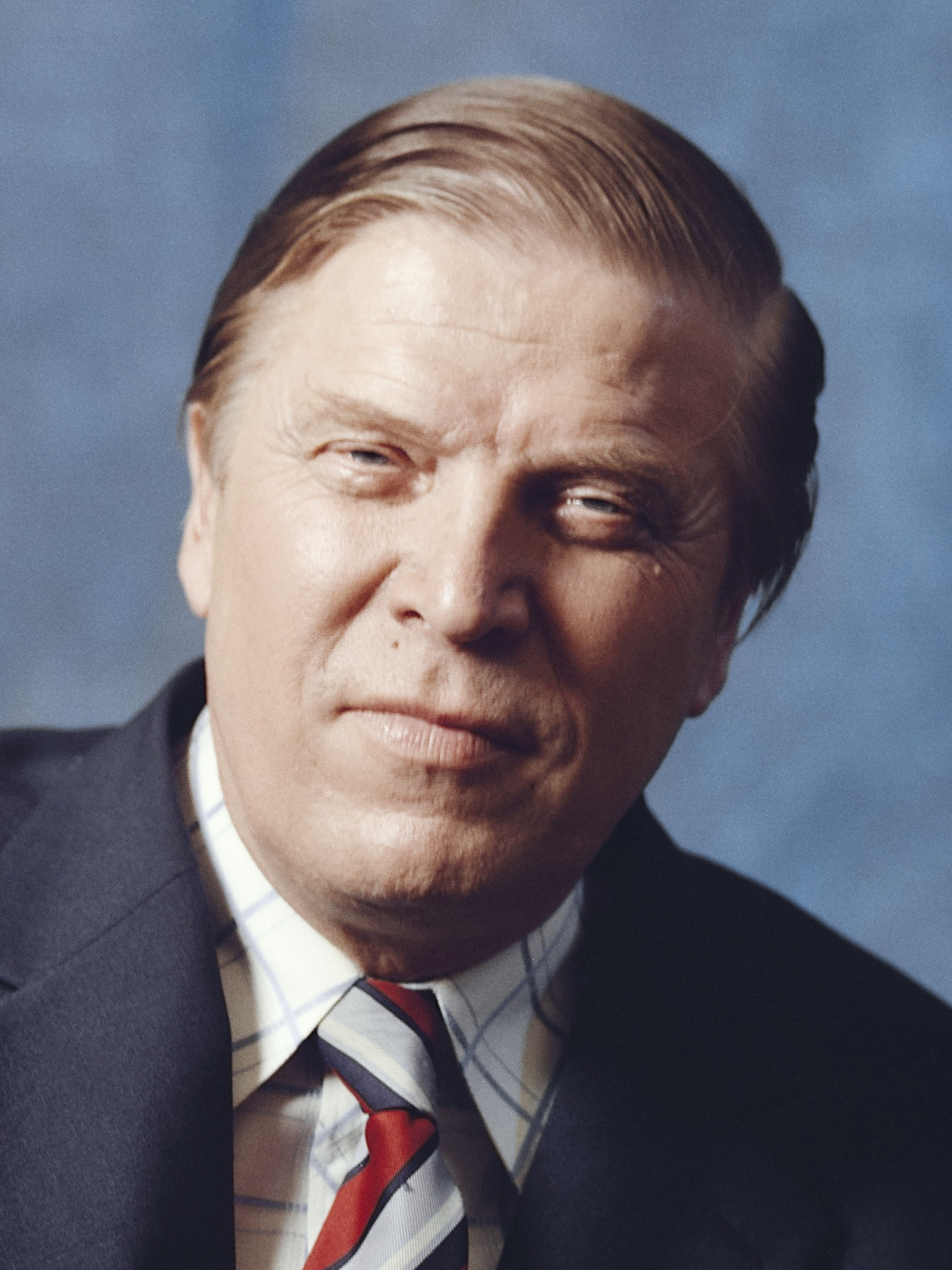

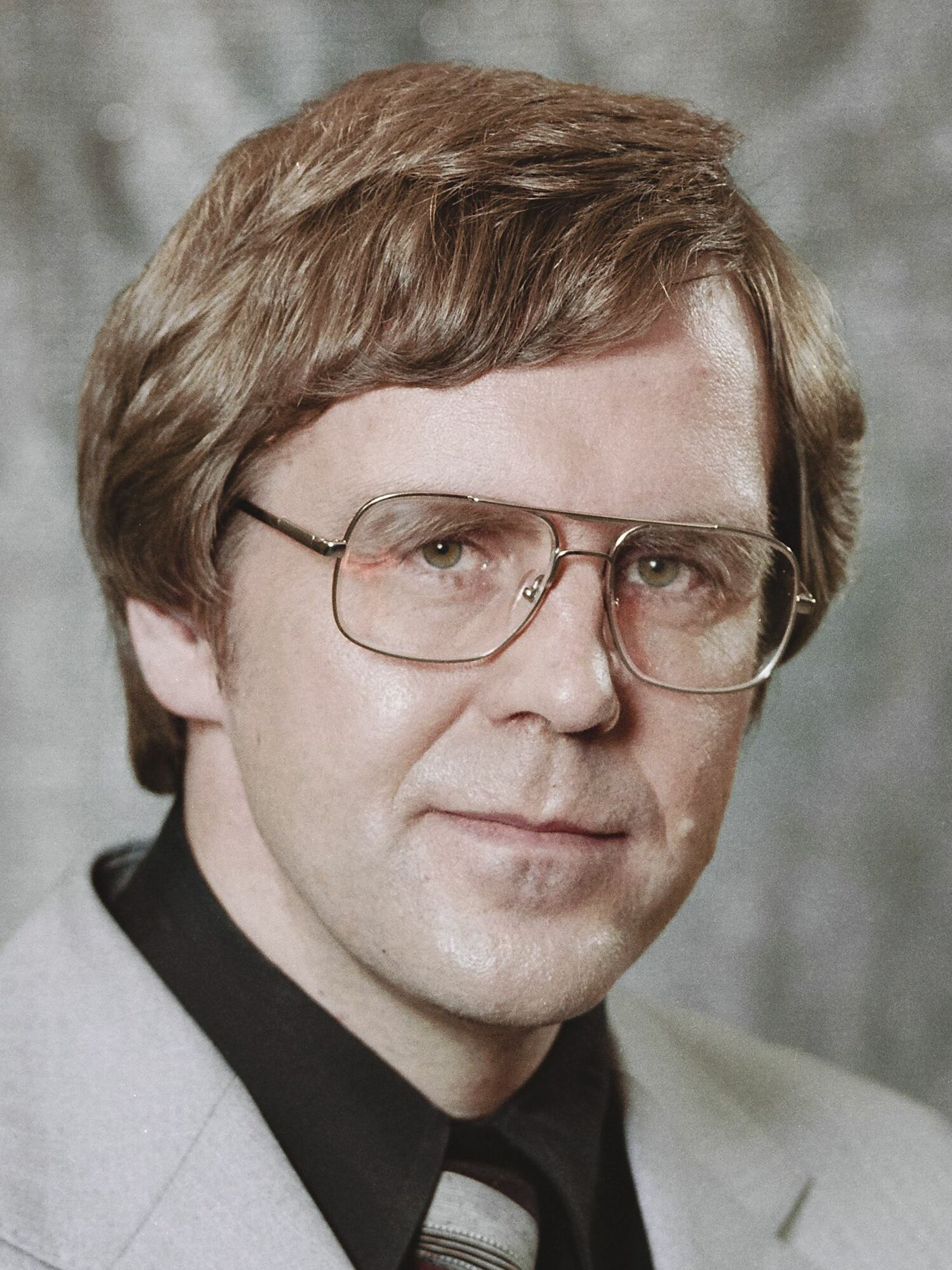
Candidate	Mauno Koivisto	Harri Holkeri
Party	SDP	National Coalition
Electoral vote	167	58
Popular vote	1,370,314	593,271
Candidate	Johannes Virolainen	Kalevi Kivistö
Party	Centre	SKDL
Electoral vote	53	11
Popular vote	534,515	348,359
President before election
Urho Kekkonen
Centre
Elected President
Mauno Koivisto
SDP

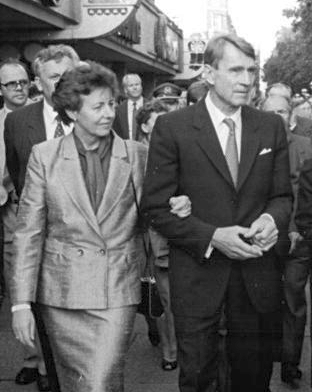
President Koivisto was first elected in 1982.

Two-stage presidential elections were held in Finland in January 1982. The public elected presidential electors to an electoral college on 17 and 18 January. They in turn elected the president. The result was a victory for Mauno Koivisto, the first member of the Social Democratic Party to be elevated to the country's highest post, and his election meant the full integration of Social Democrats into Finnish public life and an end to the postwar dominance of the Centre Party.

== Background ==
Koivisto had been a leading public figure since the late 1960s, when he had served as prime minister for two years. During the 1970s, as governor of the Bank of Finland and, for a short time, as minister of finance, he had won the public's respect for the accuracy of his economic forecasts. His personality and considerable media astuteness also won him a very considerable personal popularity across party lines. Born in 1923 in Turku, the son of a carpenter, he fought in World War II. After the war he returned to his native city, and through years of part-time study, earned a doctorate in sociology in 1956. He was active within the moderate wing of the SDP, yet did not seek an elective office. He began his banking career by directing a large employees' savings bank in Helsinki.

Summoned again in 1979 to serve as prime minister, Koivisto retained the public's esteem and became a strong potential candidate for the presidential election scheduled for 1984. Seen by Centre Party politicians as a threat to their party's hold on the presidency after Urho Kekkonen's inevitable retirement, Koivisto was pressured to resign in the spring of 1981. He refused, telling Kekkonen that he would continue as prime minister until a lack of parliamentary support for his government was shown. Koivisto's survival despite Kekkonen's challenge was seen by some observers as the end of an era in which the president had dominated Finnish public life.

In autumn 1981 failing health forced Kekkonen to resign the presidency, and Koivisto assumed the duties of the office until the presidential election set for January 1982, two years ahead of schedule. He won handily, with the Social Democratic Party receiving 43% of the votes with a turnout of 81.3% --and 145 of the electors. With the support of some electors pledged to the Finnish People's Democratic League candidate, he won, with 167 votes, on the first ballot of the electoral college. His popularity remained high during his first term, and he easily won re-election in 1988.

== Results ==
=== Popular vote ===
Party	Votes	%	Seats
Social Democratic Party	1,370,314	43.13	144
National Coalition Party	593,271	18.67	58
Centre Party	534,515	16.82	53
Finnish People's Democratic League	348,359	10.96	32
Swedish People's Party	121,519	3.82	11
Finnish Rural Party	71,947	2.26	1
Finnish Christian League	59,885	1.88	0
Liberals	56,070	1.76	1
Åland Coalition	11,119	0.35	1
Constitutional Right Party	9,532	0.30	0
Finnish People's Unity Party	994	0.03	0
Total	3,177,525	100.00	301
Valid votes	3,177,525	99.67	
Invalid/blank votes	10,531	0.33	
Total votes	3,188,056	100.00	
Registered voters/turnout	3,921,005	81.31	
Source: Nohlen & Stöver

=== Electoral college ===
Candidate	Party	First round		Second round	
Candidate	Party	Votes	%	Votes	%
Mauno Koivisto	Social Democratic Party	145	48.17	167	55.48
Harri Holkeri	National Coalition Party	58	19.27	58	19.27
Johannes Virolainen	Centre Party	53	17.61	53	17.61
Kalevi Kivistö	Finnish People's Democratic League	32	10.63	11	3.65
Jan-Magnus Jansson	Swedish People's Party	11	3.65	11	3.65
Helvi Sipilä	Liberals	1	0.33	1	0.33
Veikko Vennamo	Finnish Rural Party	1	0.33		
Raino Westerholm	Finnish Christian League	0	0.00		
Total		301	100.00	301	100.00
Source: Nohlen & Stöver
