= Social Democratic Party of Finland =

Political party in Finland

Social Democratic Party of Finland, Social Democrats of Finland, Demars Suomen sosiaalidemokraattinen puolue, Suomen sosiaalidemokraatit, Demarit (Finnish) Finlands socialdemokratiska parti, Finlands socialdemokrater, Demarerna (Swedish)
- Abbreviation: SDP; SD
- Chairperson: Antti Lindtman
- Secretary: Mikkel Näkkäläjärvi
- Parliamentary group leader: Tytti Tuppurainen
- First deputy chair: Nasima Razmyar
- Founded: 20 July 1899; 127 years ago
- Headquarters: Siltasaarenkatu 18–20C, 00530 Helsinki
- Newspaper: Demokraatti
- Student wing: Social Democratic Students
- Youth wing: Social Democratic Youth
- Membership (2021): ▼29,450
- Ideology: Social democracy
- Political position: Centre-left
- European affiliation: Party of European Socialists
- European Parliament group: Progressive Alliance of Socialists and Democrats
- International affiliation: Progressive Alliance; Socialist International
- Nordic affiliation: SAMAK; The Social Democratic Group
- Colours: Red
- Anthem: Työväen marssi
- Eduskunta: 43 / 200
- European Parliament: 2 / 15
- Municipalities: 1,699 / 8,586
- County seats: 321 / 1,379

Website
- sdp.fi

The Social Democratic Party of Finland (Finnish: Suomen sosiaalidemokraattinen puolue Finnish pronunciation: [ˈsuo̯men ˈsosiɑːliˌdemokrɑːtːinen ˈpuo̯lue], Swedish: Finlands socialdemokratiska parti, SDP), Social Democrats of Finland (Finnish: Suomen sosiaalidemokraatit, Swedish: Finlands socialdemokrater), Demars (Finnish: Demarit, Swedish: Demarerna) is a social democratic political party in Finland. It is the third-largest party in the Parliament of Finland with a total of 42 seats.

Founded in 1899 as the Workers' Party of Finland (Finnish: Suomen työväenpuolue; Swedish: Finlands arbetarparti) the SDP is Finland's oldest active political party and has a close relationship with the Central Organisation of Finnish Trade Unions. It is also a member of the Party of European Socialists, Progressive Alliance and Socialist International.

Following the resignation of Antti Rinne in December 2019, Sanna Marin became the country's 46th prime minister. The SDP formed a new coalition government on the basis of its predecessor, the Rinne Cabinet, in effect continuing its cooperation with the Centre Party, Green League, Left Alliance and Swedish People's Party. Of the nineteen ministerial spots that were decided upon in conjunction, seven of them were designated to the SDP in the Marin Cabinet. In September 2023, Antti Lindtman was elected as leader of the party following Marin's resignation after the 2023 Finnish parliamentary election.

== History ==
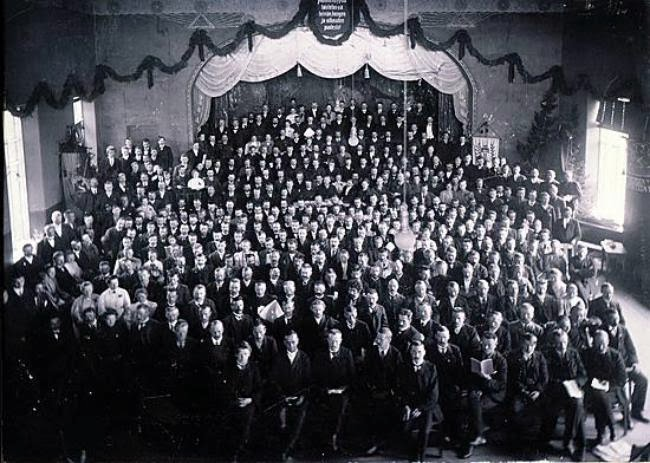
The SDP's party conference in Oulu, 1906.

The party was founded as the Workers' Party of Finland in 1899, with its first meeting being held from 17–20 July in Turku. At the beginning of the 1900s the party presented demands as well as solutions to the tenant farmer question, the managing of employment, improvement of workers' rights, freedom of speech and an 8-hour work day.

In its 1903 second party conference in Forssa, the party's name was renamed to the present form: Social Democratic Party of Finland, but the Grand Duchy of Finland's then governor-general Nikolay Bobrikov had outlawed the SDP from using "social democratic" in their name before, but this ban was not followed on by the party members when the name was changed. At the same time, the at the time radical Forssa Programme was agreed upon, which served as the official party platform until 1952. The goals of the programme were as follows: an 8-hour workday, a minimum wage, universal compulsory education and prohibition.

The Forssa Programme is based on the Erfurt Programme approved by the Social Democratic Party of Germany in 1891 and the Social Democratic Party of Austria's programme, respectively. Its immediate demands have been fulfilled, but the most significant and currently unfulfilled requirement is the right to vote directly on laws (direct democracy, as opposed to representative democracy [except for two times, and then just on advisory referendums: once about prohibition in 1931 and another on the 1994 Finnish European Union membership referendum.) The demands on total separation of church and state, abolition of religious education in all schools and the prohibition of alcohol have all since then been abandoned.

The SDP was closely associated with the Finnish Trade Union Federation (SAJ), established in 1907, with all of its members also being members of the party. The party remained a chiefly extra-parliamentary movement until universal suffrage was introduced in 1906, after which the SDP's share of the votes reached 47% in the 1916 Finnish parliamentary election, when the party secured a majority in the parliament, the only time in the history of Finland when one party has had such a majority. The party lost its majority in the 1917 Finnish parliamentary election after the Russian Provisional Government had rejected its Valtalaki 1917 proposal and disbanded the Finnish government, starting a rebellion with the broader Finnish labour movement that quickly escalated into the Finnish Civil War in 1918.

SDP members declared Finland a socialist republic, but they were defeated by the forces of the White Guard. The war resulted in most of the party leaders being killed, imprisoned or left to seek refuge in Soviet Russia. In addition, the process leading to the civil war and the war itself had stripped the party of its political legitimacy and respectability in the eyes of the right-wing majority. However, the political support for the party remained strong. In the 1919 Finnish parliamentary election, the party, reorganised by Väinö Tanner, received 80 of the 200 seats of the parliament. In 1918, former exiled SDP members founded the Communist Party of Finland (SKP) in Moscow. Although the SKP was banned in Finland until 1944, it was represented by front organisations, leading to the support of the Finnish working class being divided between the SDP and the SKP.

It became the life's work of Väinö Tanner to re-establish the SDP as a serious, governing party. The result was a much more patriotic SDP which leaned less to the left and was relatively isolated from its Nordic sister parties, namely the Danish Social Democrats, the Norwegian Labour Party and the Swedish Social Democratic Party. President Pehr Evind Svinhufvud's animosity kept the SDP out of government during his presidency from 1931 to 1937. With the exception of a brief period in 1926, when Tanner formed a minority government, the SDP was excluded from cabinet participation until Kyösti Kallio was elected president in 1937. During World War II, the party played a central role in a series of broad coalition cabinets, symbolising national unity forged in response to the threat of the Soviet Union in the Winter War of 1939–1940. The SDP was a member of the Labour and Socialist International from 1923 to 1940.

During the first few months of the Continuation War (1941–1944), the country, the parliament and the cabinet were divided on the question of whether Finland's army should stop at the old border and thereby demonstratively refrain from any attempt of conquests. However, the country's dangerous position called for national unity and the SDP's leadership chose to refrain from any visible protests. This decision is sometimes indicated as one of the main reasons behind the post-war division between the main left-wing parties (the SKP and the SDP) and the high percentage of SKP voters in the first elections after the Continuation War. After the war, the SKP was allowed to continue working and the main feature of Finnish political life during the 1944–1949 period was the competition between the SDP and the SKP, both for voters and for the control of the labour unions. During this time, the political field was divided roughly equally between the SDP, the SKP and the Agrarian League, each party commanding some 25% of the vote. In the post-war era, the SDP adopted a line of defending Finnish sovereignty and democracy in line with the Agrarian League and other bourgeois political parties, finally leading to the expulsion of the SKP from the cabinet in 1948. As a result, the Soviet Union remained more openly critical towards the SDP than the centre-right parties.

SDP municipal election poster from 1933 ("Municipal power to those who work").

Because of the SDP's anti-communism, the United States Central Intelligence Agency supported the party by means of funds laundered through Nordic sister parties or through organisations that bought luxury goods such as coffee abroad, then imported and sold them for a high profit as post-war rationing served to inflate prices. In the 1956 Finnish presidential election, the SDP candidate Karl-August Fagerholm lost by only one electoral vote to Urho Kekkonen. Fagerholm would act as prime minister in the Fagerholm II Cabinet (1956–1957) and the Fagerholm III Cabinet (1958–1959). The latter cabinet was forced to resign due to Soviet pressure, leading to a series of cabinets led by the Agrarian League. In 1958, due to the election of Väinö Tanner as party chairman, a faction of the SDP resigned and formed the Social Democratic Union of Workers and Smallholders (TPSL) around the former SDP chairman Emil Skog. The dispute was over several issues, namely whether the party should function as an interest group and whether it should co-operate with the anti-communists and right-wingers or with president Kekkonen, the Agrarian League and the SKP. During the 1960s, the TPSL dwindled, its members returning one by one to the SDP or joining the SKP, with Skog himself returning to the SDP in 1965. In the 1970 Finnish parliamentary election, the TPSL failed to gain any seats in parliament. Only in 1966 was the SDP able to satisfy the Soviet Union about its friendly attitude towards it and could thus return to the cabinet. Since then, the SDP has been represented in most Finnish cabinets, often cooperating with the centrist-agrarian Centre Party (formerly the Agrarian League), but sometimes with the liberal-conservative National Coalition Party. The SDP was in opposition from 1991 to 1995, when the main parties in the cabinet were the Centre Party and the National Coalition Party (NCP).

The 1995 Finnish parliamentary election saw a landslide victory for the SDP, achieving their best results since World War II. The SDP rose to government from the opposition and leader Paavo Lipponen headed two consecutive cabinets from 1995 to 2003. During this time, the party adopted a pro-European stance and contributed actively to the Finnish membership in the European Union in 1995 in concert with the cabinet. In the 2003 Finnish parliamentary election, the SDP won 53 of the 200 seats, ending up a close second to the Centre Party. As a result, Lipponen became the Speaker of Parliament and the Centre Party leader Anneli Jäätteenmäki became the new Prime Minister, leading a coalition cabinet that included the SDP which got eight ministerial posts. After two months in office, Jäätteenmäki resigned due to a scandal relating to the Iraq leak and was replaced by Matti Vanhanen, another Centre Party representative, who commanded the Vanhanen I Cabinet.

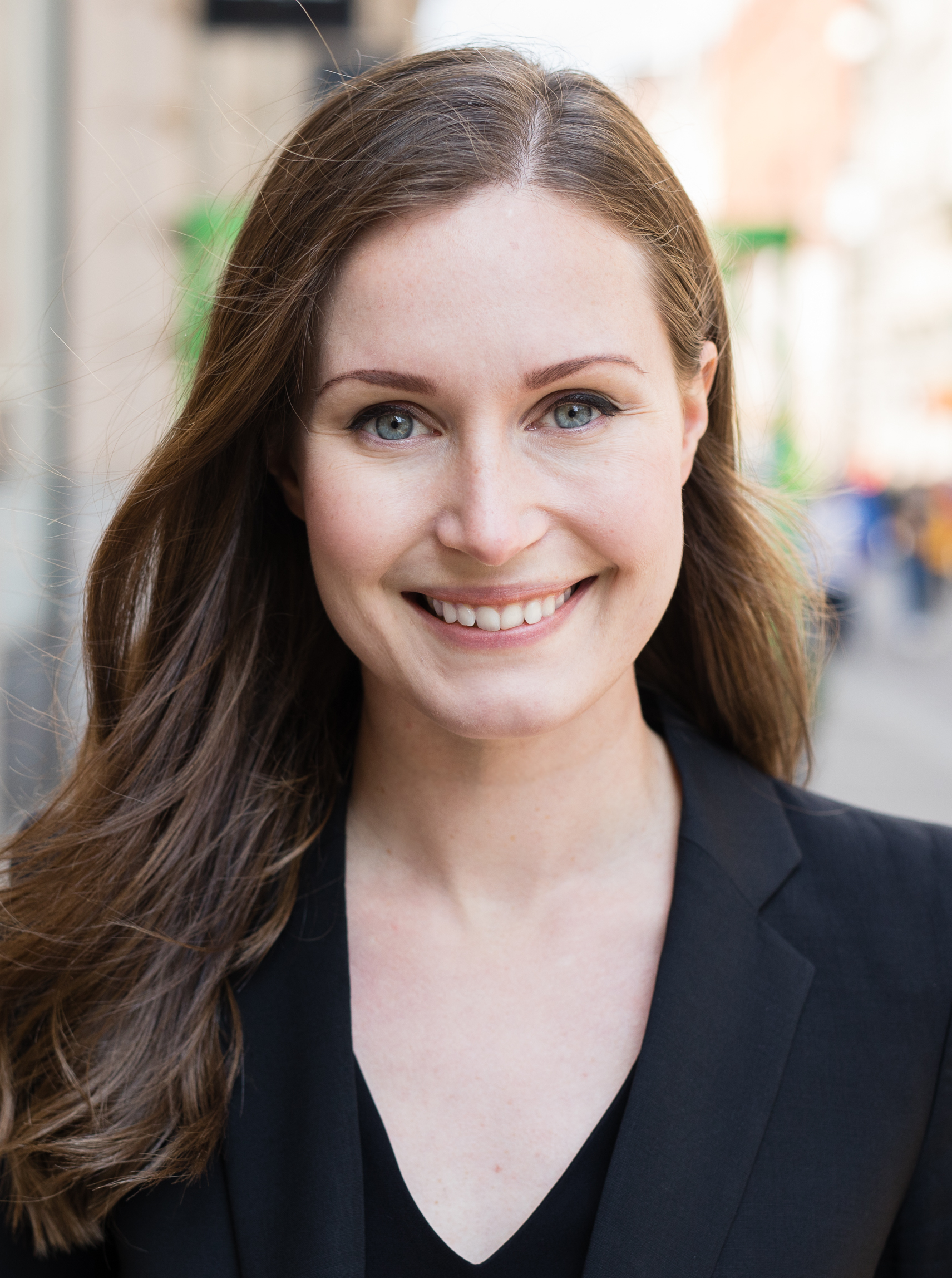
Sanna Marin, the party's leader from August 2020 to September 2023.

Support for the Social Democrats by municipality in the 2011 Finnish parliamentary election which saw the party faring strongest in southern and eastern parts of the country.

In the 2007 Finnish parliamentary election, the SDP gained the third-most votes. The chairman of the then-largest Centre Party, Matti Vanhanen, became the Prime Minister and formed a coalition cabinet consisting of the Green League, the NCP and the Swedish People's Party of Finland (SPP), leaving the SDP to the opposition. SDP leader Eero Heinäluoma did not immediately resign as party chairman, but he did announce his withdrawal from running for party chairman in the following party conference. He was replaced by Jutta Urpilainen. The SDP suffered further losses in the 2008 Finnish municipal elections and the 2009 European Parliament election. In the 2011 Finnish parliamentary election, the SDP lost three more seats, ending up with 19.1 percent of the vote which corresponded to 42 seats, the party's worst-ever result. However, as the Centre Party lost even more voters, the SDP became the second-largest party in the country after the NCP, receiving only some 1,500 votes more than the Finns Party which came in third. After lengthy negotiations, a six-party coalition government, the Katainen Cabinet, was formed with the NCP and the SDP as the two main parties. SDP leader Jutta Urpilainen became the cabinet's Minister of Finance, with NCP chairman Jyrki Katainen serving as prime minister.

In the 2014 party conference, Urpilainen was narrowly defeated by her challenger Antti Rinne in a 257 to 243 vote. Urpilainen subsequently stepped down as the Minister of Finance, passing the seat on to Rinne. In the 2015 Finnish parliamentary election, the drop of support continued for the SDP. The party lost eight more seats compared to the 2011 parliamentary election, ending up with 34 seats and 16.5 percent of the vote. With the repeat of the worst-ever result, the SDP dropped to being the fourth largest political party in Finland, receiving 50,110 fewer votes than the NCP, yet 237,000 more votes than the Green League. The SDP was left in the opposition and provided extensive criticism on the actions of the Sipilä Cabinet on matters such as alcohol policy, cuts to education spending and the so-called active model. On 22 June 2016, Maria Tolppanen, a Finns Party representative, joined the SDP. This increased the SDP's parliamentary seat number to 35.

In the 2019 Finnish parliamentary election, the SDP gained 6 seats in comparison to the 2015 parliamentary election and became the largest party in the parliament. Based on the answers and initial talks with all parties, Rinne announced that he would negotiate forming a government with the Centre Party, the Green League, the Left Alliance and the Swedish People's Party. The negotiations were ultimately successful and the Rinne Cabinet was formally inaugurated on 6 June 2019. On 3 December 2019, Rinne resigned as Prime Minister after the Centre Party had expressed a lack of confidence in Rinne for his handling of the events surrounding a postal strike in Finland. He was followed in the position by Sanna Marin, who was appointed as prime minister on 10 December 2019.

== Ideology ==
The SDP is a centre-left social-democratic party.

In its 2020 declaration of principles the party's ideals and priorities are: sustainable development, all-encompassing equality, peace, solidarity, freedom, co-operation, a clean and pristine environment together with democratic socialism. The SDP also embraces humanism's values as well as the Nordic model's accomplishments.

In the 1900s, the party known as the Finnish Workers' Party was founded on the basis of social issues, class and socialism. SDP was the only political party in Finland for a long time. In 1907, the SDP was the strongest socialist party in Europe, as evidenced by the qualified majority in the Senate of Finland in 1917. At the beginning of the 20th century, the party received its main support from groups of the landless population and the rural population. In 1919, at the SDP's meeting, a split was made with the radical communists, as a result of which they broke away and founded the SSTP. As a result of the civil war and the October Revolution, the workers' movement became even more divided.

Up until the Russian invasion of Ukraine, the party opposed Finland joining NATO and instead preferred for it to remain in the Partnership for Peace.

The SDP is in favour of queer rights, the construction of nuclear power plants, the conservation of Swedish as one of Finland's two official languages, the separation of church and state, and to the increase of funding given by the state to public schools and universities. The party is advocating for Finland to become coal-free by 2030. The SDP had advocated for policies preventing foreigners from outside the EU from working in Finland, but has since then softened its positions on immigration and has come to support certain immigration reforms. In its 2023 parliamentary election programme its self-declared goal was the increase of work-based immigration coming to Finland as a way of responding to the country's labour shortage and low birth rate. In 2023, the SDP, along with the NCP, both criticised the Finns Party for their lack of willingness to the easing of work permit requirements for foreigners coming from outside the European Union.

The party opposed certain economic reforms both in the 2011 Finnish parliamentary election and in the subsequent negotiations about the government programme. The SDP maintains a close relationship with trade unions. The party has opposed social reforms that would reduce the role of earnings-related unemployment benefits. The government pays the benefits to recipients through financial middlemen that are almost exclusively trade unions.

== Controversies ==
Some of the SDP's politicians have received criticism about their defense of Russia for years by the media and academics, for example, SDP politicians Eero Heinäluoma, Paavo Lipponen, Erkki Tuomioja, Antton Rönnholm and Tarja Halonen have received critique on their positions towards Russia.

In 2005, according to Halonen, Russia's goals were: "...democracy, human rights and good governance." Nine years later, in 2014 after Russia annexed Crimea, Halonen thought that Russia should not have been punished by sanctions or isolation.

SDP's former party secretary Antton Rönnholm has also taken his part. Through his consulting firm's services offered to Gazprom, he was sent an invoice for almost 200,000 euros for assisting in the South Stream gas pipeline project. More than half of Gazprom is owned by the Russian state, and it is partly used as a geopolitical tool in Europe and the rest of the world.

In February 2022, politician Erkki Tuomioja published a work with the title "Finland and NATO – Why Finland should have the opportunity to apply for NATO membership and why that opportunity should not be used now". In his work Tuomioja estimated that Russia was viewed rather unanalytically.

Also in February 2022, when Russia had already been pressuring Ukraine for a long time, the social-democratic MEP Eero Heinäluoma and Mauri Pekkarinen from the Centre Party both said in a Finnish current affairs television programme that preparing for a Russian threat was part of the problem. According to Heinäluoma, placing defensive armaments in Russia's neighbouring countries was instead a threat to Russia.

Paavo Lipponen has lobbied for and been a consultant for Russia's Nord Stream project since 2008. In that year Russia went to war with Georgia. In a report published by the European Parliament's special committee in 2022, the Social Democratic Party prime minister Lipponen and Centre Party prime minister Esko Aho were stated to be among the European politicians that Russia and China had hijacked to promote their special interests. Some current SDP politicians have therefore appeased Russia in the past.

In September 2023, when Antti Lindtman got elected chair of the SDP a scandal broke out due to an old picture of him posing near four other naked young adults, nude, wearing a pointed hat in the style of a christmas elf, covered by a balaclava and with an airsoft gun in hand while in his adolescent years, while two others were doing a nazi salute in the same picture. Because of this, Lindtman was accused of being a Nazi. He responded by stating that the image had been taken during his time in a high school film group by the name of "Team Paha, English: Team Bad" in a Pikkujoulu party while they were messing around and posted online. Lindtman additionally firmly denied the allegation of being a national socialist.

The party secretary, Mikkel Näkkäläjärvi's, nomination and subsequent appointment to his role during the SDP's 2023 conference in Jyväskylä was criticised because of his criminal background. In 2011 he had driven a car while under the presence of alcohol, and was charged with a 30-day suspended sentence and an accompanying fine. Näkkäläjärvi had also broken into a retired old lady's summer cottage as a 15-year-old teenager with three others around the same age as him and participated in the killing and burning of a grown-up cat in a bonfire. Following this, he was charged with burglary, vandalism and animal cruelty as a young person. Näkkäläjärvi has apologised for all of his past misdeeds.

== Voter base ==
The average age of an SDP member is 61.5 years. Over one half of all SDP voters are active members of the workforce.

== Organization ==
=== Symbols, logos and posters ===
Logo from 2020 to the present day.

Logo from 2010–2015.

Logo from 2009–2010.

Historical logo.

Original logo.

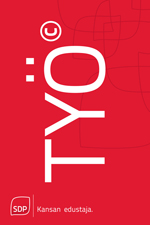
TYÖ Poster used in the 2011 Finnish parliamentary election and the 2012 Finnish municipal elections.

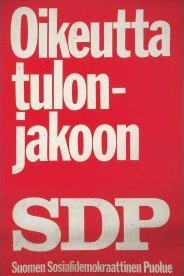
A Social Democratic Party poster for the 1972 Finnish parliamentary election.

=== Party leaders ===
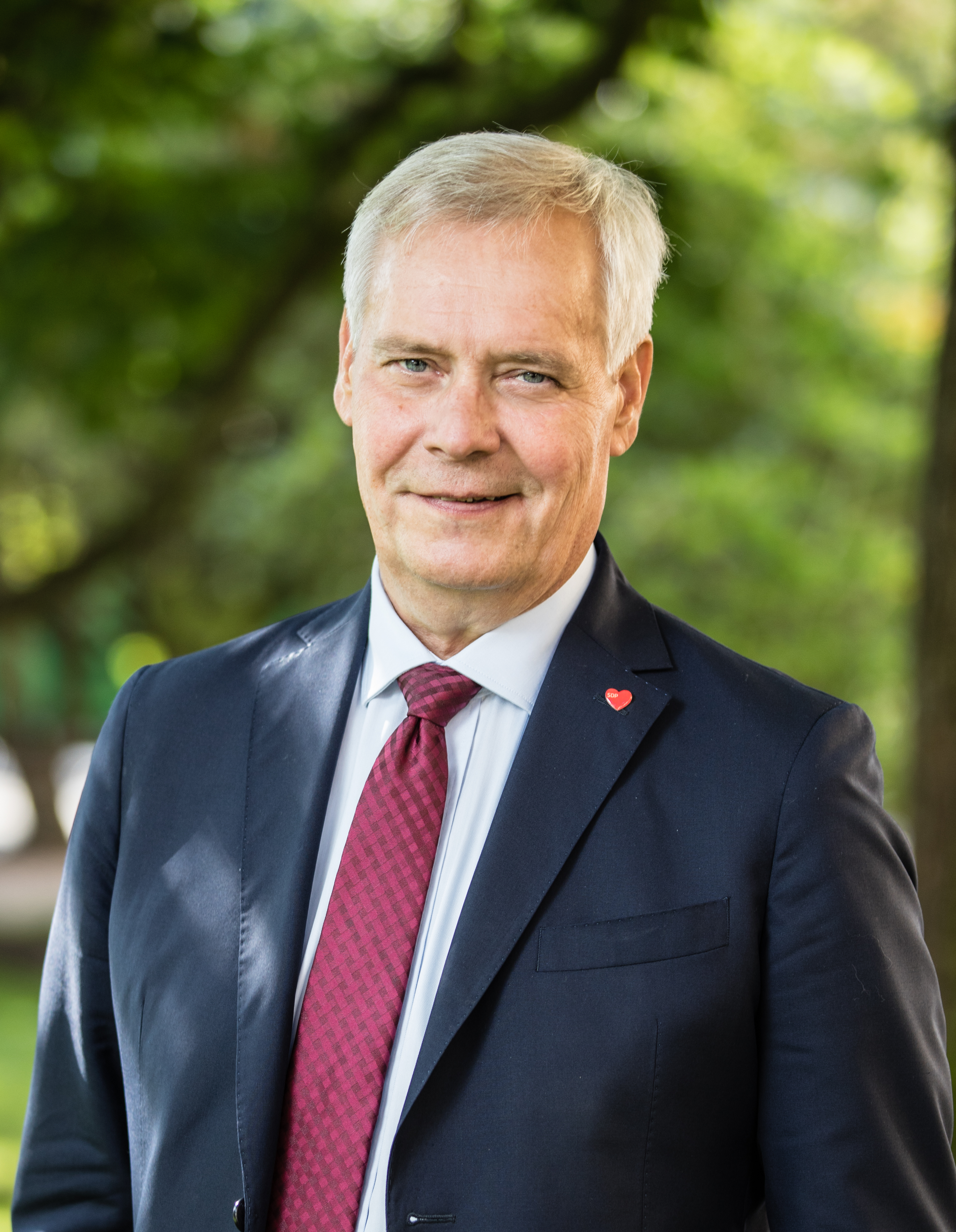
Antti Rinne, the leader of the Social Democratic Party of Finland from May 2014 to August 2020.

Leader	Time
Nils Robert af Ursin	1899–1900
J. A. Salminen	1900
K. F. Hellstén	1900–1903
Taavi Tainio	1903–1905
Emil Perttilä	1905–1906
Edvard Valpas-Hänninen	1906–1909
Matti Paasivuori	1909–1911, 1913–1917, 1926–1930
Otto Wille Kuusinen	1911–1913
Kullervo Manner	1917–1918
Väinö Tanner	1918–1926, 1957–1963
Kaarlo Harvala	1930–1942
Väinö Salovaara	1942–1944
Onni Hiltunen	1944–1946
Emil Skog	1946–1957
Rafael Paasio	1963–1975
Kalevi Sorsa	1975–1987
Pertti Paasio	1987–1991
Ulf Sundqvist	1991–1993
Paavo Lipponen	1993–2005
Eero Heinäluoma	2005–2008
Jutta Urpilainen	2008–2014
Antti Rinne	2014–2020
Sanna Marin	2020–2023
Antti Lindtman	from 2023

=== Prominent members ===
Oskari Tokoi	Chairperson of the Senate in 1917.
Yrjö Sirola	Founder of the Communist Party of Finland.
Väinö Tanner	Prime Minister (1926–1927). Foreign Minister (1939–1940).
Karl-August Fagerholm	Prime Minister (1948–1950, 1956–1957 and 1958–1959). Speaker of Parliament (1945–1948, 1950–1956, 1957–1958, 1958–1962 and 1965–1966).
Rafael Paasio	Prime Minister (1966–1968 and 1972).
Kalevi Sorsa	Prime Minister (1972–1975, 1977–1979 and 1982–1987).
Mauno Koivisto	Prime Minister (1968–1970 and 1979–1982). President (1982–1994).
Pentti Väänänen	Secretary General of the Socialist International (1983–1989).
Martti Ahtisaari	President (1994–2000). Nobel Peace Prize laureate (2008).
Erkki Tuomioja	Foreign Minister (2000–2007 and 2011–2015).
Paavo Lipponen	Prime Minister (1995–2003). Speaker of the Parliament (2003–2007).
Tarja Halonen	Foreign Minister (1995–2000). President (2000–2012).
Eero Heinäluoma	Speaker of the Parliament (2011–2015).
Jutta Urpilainen	Finance Minister and Deputy Prime Minister (2011–2014).
Antti Rinne	Finance Minister and Deputy Prime Minister (2014–2015). Prime Minister (2019).
Sanna Marin	Prime Minister (2019–2023). Minister of Transport and Communications (2019).

== Election results ==
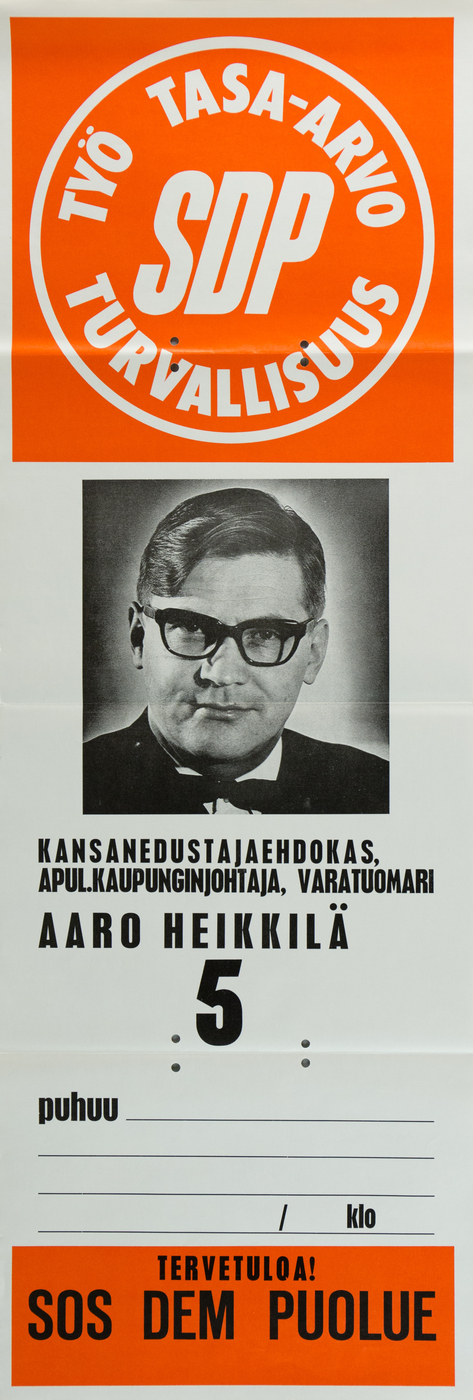
Aaro Heikkilä election advertisement from 1970.

=== Parliament of Finland ===
Parliament of Finland
Election	Popular vote				Number of seats			Status
Election	Votes	%	± pp	Rank	Seats	+/–	Rank	Status
1907	329,946	37.03	▲37.03	▲1st	80 / 200	▲80	▲1st	Opposition
1908	310,826	38.40	▲1.37	1st	83 / 200	▲3	1st	Opposition
1909	337,685	39.89	▲1.49	1st	84 / 200	▲1	1st	Opposition
1910	316,951	40.04	▲0.15	1st	86 / 200	▲2	1st	Opposition
1911	321,201	40.03	▼0.01	1st	86 / 200	0	1st	Opposition
1913	312,214	43.11	▲3.08	1st	90 / 200	▲4	1st	Opposition
1916	376,030	47.29	▲4.18	1st	103 / 200	▲13	1st	Opposition
1917	444,670	44.79	▼2.50	1st	92 / 200	▼11	1st	Opposition
1919	365,046	37.98	▼7.51	1st	80 / 200	▼12	1st	Opposition
1922	216,861	25.06	▼12.22	1st	53 / 200	▼27	1st	Opposition
1924	255,068	29.02	▲3.96	1st	60 / 200	▲7	1st	Opposition (1924–1926)
1924	255,068	29.02	▲3.96	1st	60 / 200	▲7	1st	Coalition (1926–1927)
1927	257,572	28.30	▼0.72	1st	60 / 200	0	1st	Opposition
1929	260,254	27.36	▼0.94	1st	59 / 200	▼1	▼2nd	Opposition
1930	386,026	34.16	▲6.80	1st	66 / 200	▲7	▲1st	Opposition
1933	413,551	37.33	▲3.17	1st	78 / 200	▲12	1st	Opposition
1936	452,751	38.59	▲1.26	1st	83 / 200	▲5	1st	Opposition (1936–1937)
1936	452,751	38.59	▲1.26	1st	83 / 200	▲5	1st	Coalition (1937–1939)
1939	515,980	39.77	▲1.18	1st	85 / 200	▲2	1st	Coalition
1945	425,948	25.08	▼14.69	1st	50 / 200	▼35	1st	Coalition
1948	494,719	26.32	▲1.24	1st	54 / 200	▲4	▼2nd	Coalition (1948–1950)
1948	494,719	26.32	▲1.24	1st	54 / 200	▲4	▼2nd	Opposition (1950–1951)
1948	494,719	26.32	▲1.24	1st	54 / 200	▲4	▼2nd	Coalition (1951)
1951	480,754	26.52	▲0.20	1st	53 / 200	▼1	▲1st	Coalition (1951–1953)
1951	480,754	26.52	▲0.20	1st	53 / 200	▼1	▲1st	Opposition (1953–1954)
1951	480,754	26.52	▲0.20	1st	53 / 200	▼1	▲1st	Coalition (1954)
1954	527,094	26.25	▼0.27	1st	54 / 200	▲1	1st	Coalition (1954–1957)
1954	527,094	26.25	▼0.27	1st	54 / 200	▲1	1st	Opposition (1957–1958)
1958	449,536	23.12	▼3.13	▼2nd	48 / 200	▼6	▼2nd	Coalition (1958–1959)
1958	449,536	23.12	▼3.13	▼2nd	48 / 200	▼6	▼2nd	Opposition (1959–1962)
1962	448,930	19.50	▼3.62	▼3rd	38 / 200	▼10	▼3rd	Opposition
1966	645,339	27.23	▲7.73	▲1st	55 / 200	▲17	▲1st	Coalition
1970	594,185	23.43	▼3.80	1st	52 / 200	▼3	1st	Coalition
1972	664,724	25.78	▲2.35	1st	55 / 200	▲3	1st	Coalition
1975	683,590	24.86	▼0.92	1st	54 / 200	▼1	1st	Coalition (1975–1976)
1975	683,590	24.86	▼0.92	1st	54 / 200	▼1	1st	Opposition (1976–1977)
1975	683,590	24.86	▼0.92	1st	54 / 200	▼1	1st	Coalition (1977–1979)
1979	691,512	23.89	▼0.97	1st	52 / 200	▼2	1st	Coalition
1983	795,953	26.71	▲2.82	1st	57 / 200	▲5	1st	Coalition
1987	695,331	24.14	▼2.57	1st	56 / 200	▼1	1st	Coalition
1991	603,080	22.12	▼2.02	▼2nd	48 / 200	▼8	▼2nd	Opposition
1995	785,637	28.25	▲6.13	▲1st	63 / 200	▲15	▲1st	Coalition
1999	612,963	22.86	▼5.39	1st	51 / 200	▼12	1st	Coalition
2003	683,223	24.47	▲1.61	▼2nd	53 / 200	▲2	▼2nd	Coalition
2007	594,194	21.44	▼3.03	▼3rd	45 / 200	▼8	▼3rd	Opposition
2011	561,558	19.10	▼2.34	▲2nd	42 / 200	▼3	▲2nd	Coalition
2015	490,102	16.51	▼2.59	▼4th	34 / 200	▼8	▼4th	Opposition
2019	546,471	17.73	▲1.22	▲1st	40 / 200	▲6	▲1st	Coalition
2023	617,552	19.95	▲2.22	▼3rd	43 / 200	▲3	▼3rd	Opposition

=== Municipal ===
Municipal Councils
Year	Councillors	Votes	%
1945	2,100	265,689	
1950		377,294	25.05%
1953		449,251	25.53%
1956		424,977	25.42%
1960	2,261	414,175	21.10%
1964	2,543	530,878	24.75%
1968	2,351	540,450	23.86%
1972	2,533	676,387	27.05%
1976	2,735	665,632	24.82%
1980	2,820	699,280	25.50%
1984	2,830	666,218	24.70%
1988	2,866	663,692	25.23%
1992	3,130	721,310	27.08%
1996	2,742	583,623	24.55%
2000	2,559	511,370	22.99%
2004	2,585	575,822	24.11%
2008	2,066	541,187	21.23%
2012	1,729	487,924	19.57%
2017	1,697	498,252	19.38%
2021	1,451	433,811	17.7%
2025	1,699	557,768	23.1%

=== County ===
Wellbeing services counties of Finland
Year	Councillors	Votes	%
2022	275	359,014	19.3%
2025	321	444,404	22.5%

=== European Parliament ===
Election	Votes	%	Seats	+/–	EP Group
1996	482,577	21.45 (#2)	4 / 16	New	PES
1999	221,836	17.86 (#3)	3 / 16	▼1	PES
2004	350,525	21.16 (#3)	3 / 14	0	PES
2009	292,051	17.54 (#3)	2 / 13	▼1	S&D
2014	212,211	12.31 (#4)	2 / 13	0	S&D
2019	267,342	14.62 (#3)	2 / 13	0	S&D
2024	272,034	14.87 (#3)	2 / 15	0	S&D

=== Presidential elections ===
==== Indirect ====
Electoral college
Year	Candidate	Popular vote				First ballot			Second ballot			Third ballot			Results
Year	Candidate	Votes	%	Seats	Rank	Votes	%	Rank	Votes	%	Rank	Votes	%	Rank	Results
1919	Väinö Tanner					1 / 300	0.5	4th							Lost
1925	Väinö Tanner	165,091	26.55	79 / 300	1st	78 / 300	26.0	1st	2 / 300	0.7	5th				Lost
1931	Väinö Tanner	252,550	30.2	90 / 300	1st	90 / 300	30.0	1st	0 / 300	0.0	4th				Lost
1937	Väinö Tanner	341,408	30.68	95 / 300	1st										Lost
1940	Johan Helo					4 / 300	1.30	2nd							Lost
1943															
1946															
1950		343,828	21.80	64 / 300	2nd										
1956	Karl-August Fagerholm	442,408	23.33	72 / 300	2nd	72 / 300	24.0	2nd	114 / 300	38.0	1st	149 / 300	49.7	2nd	Lost
1962	Rafael Paasio	289,366	13.08	36 / 300	3rd	37 / 300	12.3	3rd							Lost
1968	Urho Kekkonen	315,068	15.46	55 / 300	4th	201 / 300	67.0	1st							Won
1978	Urho Kekkonen	569,154	23.25	74 / 300	1st	259 / 300	86.3	1st							Won
1982	Mauno Koivisto	1,370,314	43.10	144 / 300	1st	145 / 300	48.3	1st	167 / 300	55.7	1st				Won
1988 (Note: The 1988 presidential election was partially indirect. After Koivisto had failed to get a majority of the popular vote, he was elected president in the electoral college which the voters voted for alongside the direct vote.)	Mauno Koivisto	1,175,209	39.36	128 / 301	1st	144 / 301	48.0	1st	189 / 301	63.0	1st				Won

==== Direct ====
Presidency of the Republic of Finland
Year	Candidate	1st round				2nd round				Results
Year	Candidate	Votes	%	± pp	Rank	Votes	%	± pp	Rank	Results
1988	Mauno Koivisto	1,513,234	48.90	—N/a	1st	—N/a				Won
1994	Martti Ahtisaari	828,038	25.91	▼22.99	1st	1,723,485	53.85	▲5.85	1st	Won
2000	Tarja Halonen	1,224,431	40.03	▲14.12	1st	1,644,532	51.63	▼2.22	1st	Won
2006	Tarja Halonen	1,397,030	46.31	▲6.28	1st	1,630,980	51.79	▲0.16	1st	Won
2012	Paavo Lipponen	205,020	6.70	▼39.61	▼5th					Lost
2018	Tuula Haatainen	97,294	3.25	▼3.45	▼6th					Lost
2024	Jutta Urpilainen	140,802	4.34	▲1.09	6th					Lost

== See also ==
- Nordic model
- List of Social Democratic Party (Finland) breakaway parties
