= Lipponen I cabinet =

66th cabinet of Finland

Lipponen's First Cabinet
- 66th Cabinet of Finland

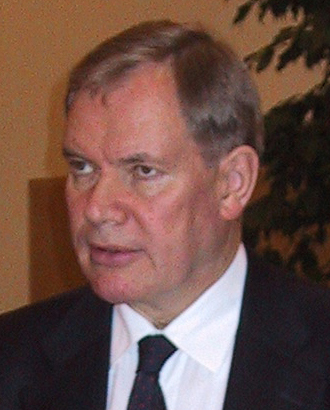
- Date formed: 13 April 1995
- Date dissolved: 15 April 1999

People and organisations
- Head of state: Martti Ahtisaari
- Head of government: Paavo Lipponen
- Member party: Social Democratic Party; National Coalition Party; Swedish People's Party; Left Alliance; Green League
- Status in legislature: Majority (coalition)

History
- Election: 1995 parliamentary election
- Predecessor: Aho Cabinet
- Successor: Lipponen II Cabinet

The first cabinet of Paavo Lipponen was the 66th government of Finland, which existed from 13 April 1995 to 15 April 1999. The cabinet's Prime Minister was Paavo Lipponen. It was a majority government, and one of the longest-running governments in Finnish history. Lipponen's first government ran for a whole term of a Finnish cabinet, or 1 464 days in total. The cabinet was composed of a coalition formed by the Social Democratic Party, the National Coalition Party, the Swedish People's Party, the Left Alliance, and the Green League. Due to the cabinet containing five separate parties from all over Finland's political spectrum, both of Lipponen's cabinets were considered rainbow coalitions (Finnish: sateenkaarihallitukset).

== Ministers ==
Portfolio	Minister	Took office	Left office	Party
Prime Minister	Paavo Lipponen	April 13, 1995	April 15, 1999	Social Democratic Party
Deputy Prime Minister	Sauli Niinistö	April 13, 1995	April 15, 1999	National Coalition Party
Minister for Foreign Affairs	Tarja Halonen	April 13, 1995	April 15, 1999	Social Democratic Party
Minister of Justice	Sauli Niinistö	April 13, 1995	February 2, 1996	National Coalition Party
Minister of Justice	Kari Häkämies	February 2, 1996	March 13, 1998	National Coalition Party
Minister of Justice	Jussi Järventaus	March 13, 1998	April 15, 1999	National Coalition Party
Minister of the Interior	Jan-Erik Enestam	April 13, 1995	April 15, 1999	Swedish People's Party
Minister of Defence	Anneli Taina	April 13, 1995	April 15, 1999	National Coalition Party
Minister of Finance	Iiro Viinanen	April 13, 1995	February 2, 1996	National Coalition Party
Minister of Finance	Sauli Niinistö	February 2, 1996	April 15, 1999	National Coalition Party
Minister of Education	Olli-Pekka Heinonen	April 13, 1995	April 15, 1999	National Coalition Party
Minister of Agriculture and Forestry	Kalevi Hemilä	April 13, 1995	April 15, 1999	Independent
Minister of Transport	Tuula Linnainmaa	April 13, 1995	April 1, 1997	National Coalition Party
Minister of Transport	Matti Aura	April 2, 1997	January 15, 1999	National Coalition Party
Minister of Transport	Kimmo Sasi	January 15, 1999	April 15, 1999	National Coalition Party
Minister of Trade and Industry	Antti Kalliomäki	April 13, 1995	April 15, 1999	Social Democratic Party
Minister of Social Affairs and Health	Sinikka Mönkäre	April 13, 1995	April 15, 1999	Social Democratic Party
Minister of Labour	Liisa Jaakonsaari	April 13, 1995	April 15, 1999	Social Democratic Party
Minister of the Environment	Pekka Haavisto	April 13, 1995	April 15, 1999	Green League

== See also ==
- Paavo Lipponen's second Cabinet

Preceded by Esko Aho's cabinet	Cabinet of Finland; April 13, 1995 - April 15, 1999	Succeeded by Paavo Lipponen's second cabinet
