= Maija Perho =

Finnish politician (born 1948)

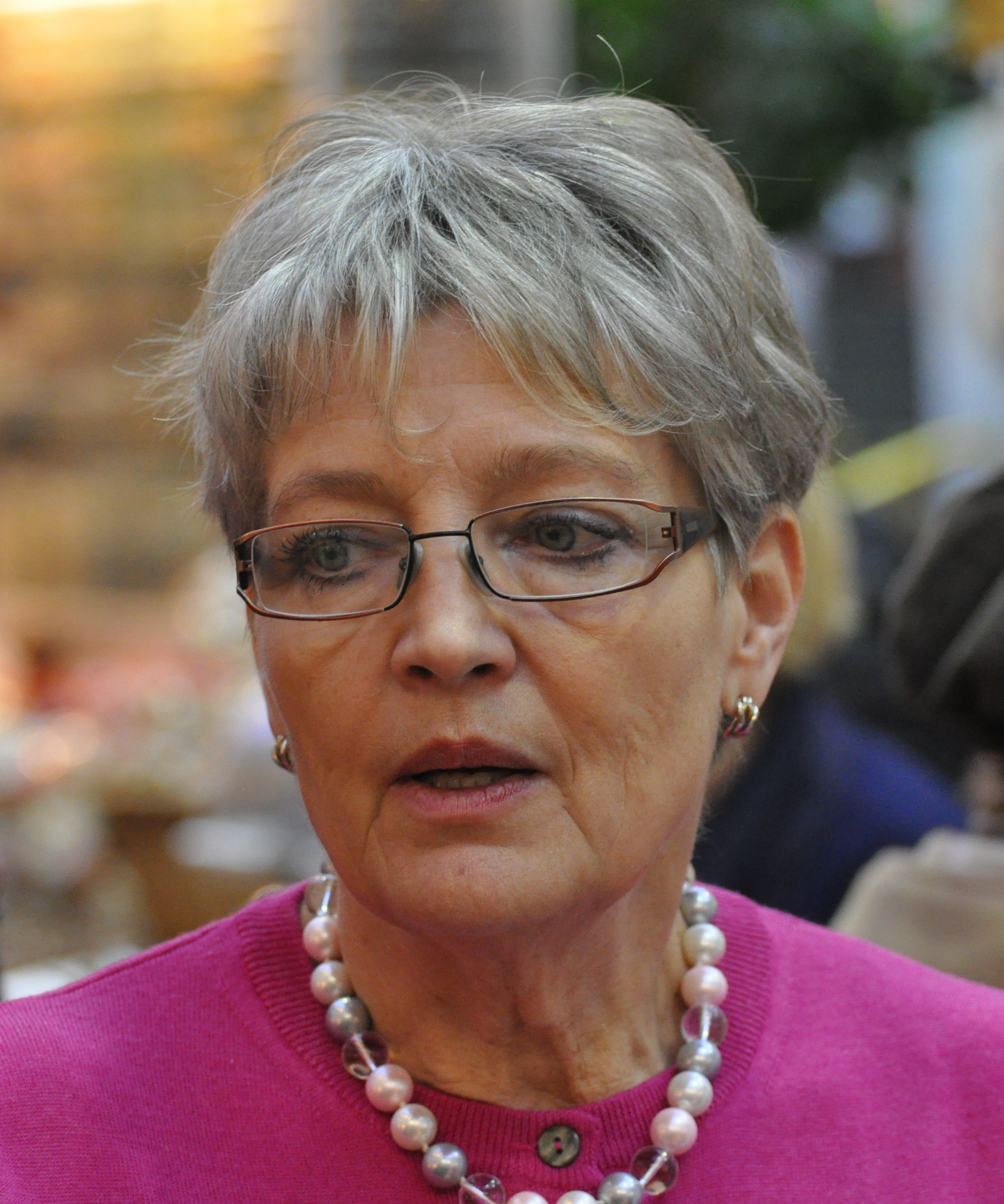
- Perho in 2011

Member of the Parliament of Finland
- In office 22 March 1991 – 20 March 2007
- Constituency: Varsinais-Suomi

Finland Minister of Social Affairs and Health
- In office 15 April 1999 – 17 April 2003
- Prime Minister: Paavo Lipponen

Personal details
- Born: Maija Riitta Perho; 29 May 1948 (age 78) Ypäjä, Finland
- Party: National Coalition Party
- Education: University of Turku

Maija Riitta Perho (born 29 May 1948) is a Finnish politician. She represented Varsinais-Suomi in the Parliament of Finland from 1991 to 2007 as a member of the National Coalition Party. From 1999 to 2003, she was Finland's minister of social affairs and health in the cabinet of Prime Minister Paavo Lipponen.

== Early life and education ==
Perho was born on 29 May 1948 in Ypäjä, Finland. She is the daughter of Heikki Perho, a farmer who was a member of the Finnish Parliament as a member of the National Coalition Party (NCP) from 1975 to 1991. She completed the national matriculation exam in 1967. Perho was active in politics as a student, and recruited future president Sauli Niinistö into the student branch of the NCP in 1968. Perho attended the University of Turku, receiving a master's degree in social sciences in 1974.

== Career ==
After graduating, Perho became a planning secretary at the Turku health centre, and from 1979 to 1985 she worked at the city's planning department. She was a Turku city councillor from 1981 to 1985, and afterwards became the city's first female director of social services.

In 1991, Perho was elected to the Parliament of Finland to represent Turku Province South (later renamed Varsinais-Suomi), the district that her father had represented for the preceding 16 years. Throughout her time in Parliament, she was a member of several parliamentary committees, including Social Affairs and Health, Finance, and the Committee for the Future. Perho unsuccessfully challenged Pertti Salolainen for the role of NCP chair during her first term; she later became the party's secretary in 1995 and vice chair in 2003.

Prime Minister Paavo Lipponen appointed Perho as minister of social affairs and health in his second cabinet in 1999. As minister, she worked on proposals to reform the national pension system and Kela, the social security agency. During her tenure, she signed a mutual social security agreement with Latvia and negotiated a cooperative healthcare agreement with Russia.

Perho lost a re-election bid in 2007. After leaving Parliament, she continued working in health policy organisations and has held leadership roles in various arts and theatre groups. She was recognized as an honorary member of the NCP in 2018.

== Personal life ==
Perho married Markku Lehtinen, a Turku city official, in 1997. She has two daughters from a previous marriage. Perho and Lehtinen divorced in 2017.

== See also ==
- List of Cabinet Ministers from Finland by ministerial portfolio
