= Olli-Pekka Heinonen =

Finnish politician

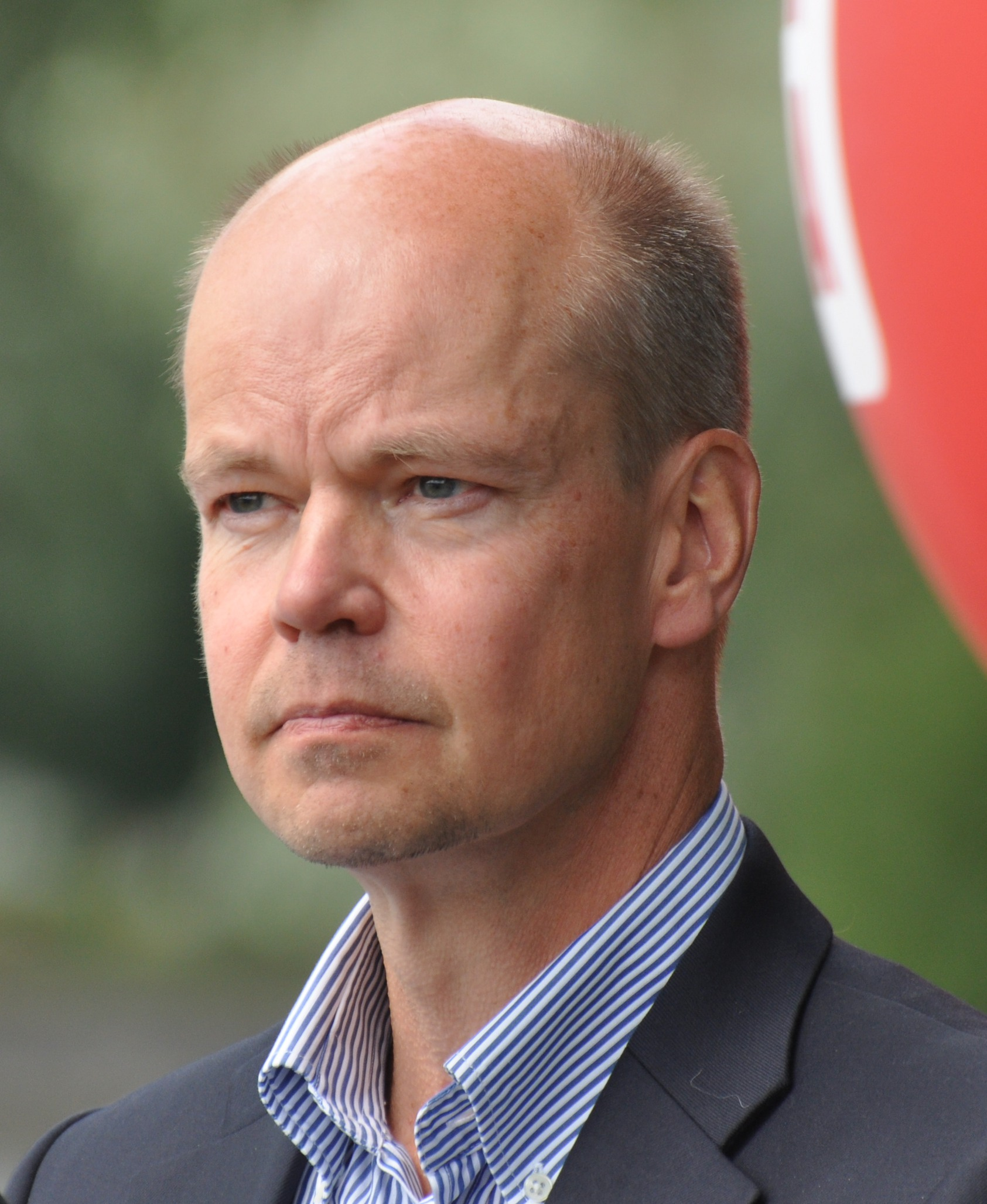

Director General of the International Baccalaureate Organization
- Incumbent
- Assumed office 1 May 2021
- Preceded by: Siva Kumari

Minister of Transport and Communications
- In office 15 April 1999 – 3 January 2002
- Prime Minister: Paavo Lipponen
- Preceded by: Kimmo Sasi
- Succeeded by: Kimmo Sasi

Minister of Education
- In office 11 February 1994 – 15 April 1999
- Prime Minister: Esko Aho (1994–1995); Paavo Lipponen (1995–1999)
- Preceded by: Riitta Uosukainen
- Succeeded by: Maija Rask

Personal details
- Born: 25 June 1964 (age 61) Eurajoki, Finland
- Party: National Coalition

Olli-Pekka Heinonen (born 25 June 1964) is a Finnish politician and public servant. During his career as a politician he represented the National Coalition Party.

== Career ==
Heinonen was born in Eurajoki. He graduated as Master of Laws from the University of Helsinki in 1990. From 1994 to 1999, he served as the Minister of Education in the Aho cabinet and Lipponen I Cabinet after being assistant to Riitta Uosukainen, the previous Minister of Education. In 1995, Heinonen was elected to the Parliament of Finland, representing Satakunta. In the second Lipponen Cabinet, he served as the Minister of Transport and Communications from 1999 to 2002.

Heinonen left politics in 2002 when he was appointed a manager at Yleisradio, the public broadcasting company of Finland. He was responsible for the transfer from analogue television to digital television in Finland. In 2012, he was appointed state secretary of Prime Minister Jyrki Katainen, and in 2015 Heinonen became state secretary of all National Coalition Party cabinet ministers. In September 2016, he was appointed general director of the Finnish National Agency for Education.

Since 1 May 2021 Heinonen has held the role of Director-General of the International Baccalaureate. This is the first time the International Baccalaureate has appointed a Director-General who previously held a political position.
