= Jari Vilén =

Finnish diplomat and politician

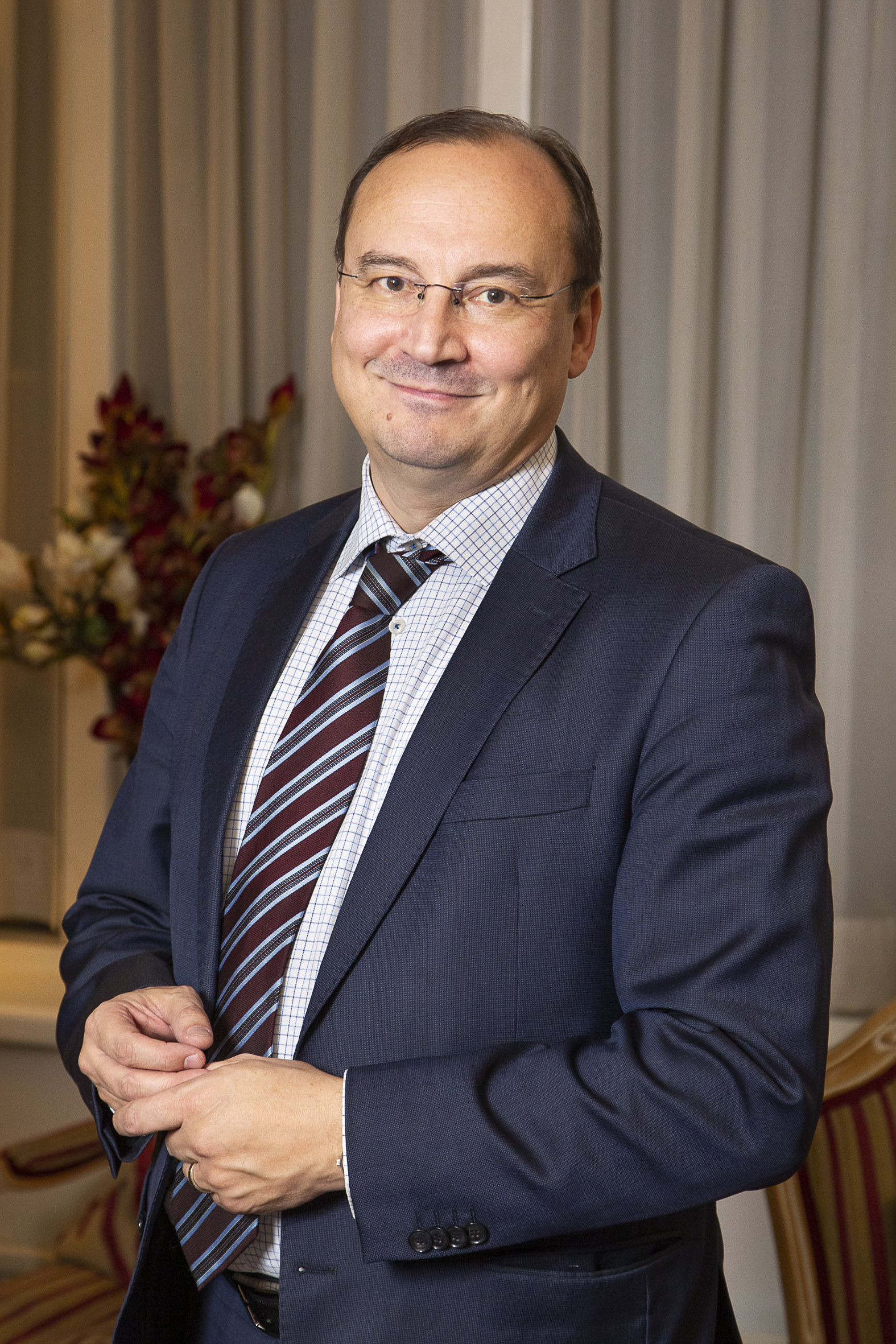
- Vilén in 2018

Minister of Foreign Trade and European Affairs
- In office 4 January 2002 – 17 April 2003
- Prime Minister: Paavo Lipponen
- Preceded by: Kimmo Sasi
- Succeeded by: Paula Lehtomäki

Personal details
- Born: 17 April 1964 (age 62) Kemi, Finland
- Party: National Coalition Party
- Spouse: Eva Söregi-Vilén

Jari Pekka Olavi Vilén (born 17 April 1964 in Kemi) is a Finnish diplomat and politician. He served in the Parliament of Finland from 1999 to 2007 as a representative of the district of Lapland and member of the National Coalition Party. Since 2007, he has served as Finland's ambassador to several countries. Following allegations of sexual and financial misconduct in 2024, he was relocated to Helsinki.

== Education ==
After attaining a Master of Education from the University of Oulu in 1990, Vilén continued his academic career as a researcher at Trinity College Dublin and a teacher at St Andrew's College, Dublin from 1990 to 1991. He was an assistant at the University of Oulu from 1991 to 1992. From 1992 to 1994, he conducted research with a grant from the Academy of Finland in Vrije Universiteit Brussel.

In December 2001, the University of Oulu investigated Vilén's master's thesis from 1989 and later conducted a second investigation. They concluded that the first 27 pages of the 45-page thesis were copied from another source without proper citation. Vilén, his thesis supervisor, and the Faculty board were all reprimanded. The university also stated that there was no legal basis to dissolve the acceptance of the thesis.

== Political career ==
Vilén chaired the Finnish Teacher Student Association from 1988 to 1989. He also served as Vice-Chairman for the National Coalition Party Council from 1995 to 2000. After serving as the Regional Secretary of the Lapland League from 1995 to 1999, Vilén began his first term as a Member of Parliament in 1999.

=== Member of Parliament ===
In 2001, Vilén chaired the Conservative Group at the Nordic Council. He chaired the administrative council of the Finnish Fund for Industrial Cooperation Ltd (Finnfund) twice, first from 2000 to 2001 and again from 2003 to 2007. From 2002 to 2003, he served as the Minister for European Affairs in Prime Minister Paavo Lipponen's second cabinet. Additionally, he served as the Minister for Foreign Trade from 4 January 2002 until 17 March 2003 and was a member of the Foreign Affairs Committee.

Vilén chaired the European Movement in Finland from 2003 to 2007 and the National Educational Association in 2004. Vilén was chosen to succeed sitting prime minister Matti Vanhanen as a member of the Convention on the Future of Europe, a role he served in from 9 May 2003 to 10 July. The convention aimed to draft a constitution for the European Union. Vilén chaired the Grand Committee of the Parliament of Finland from 18 June 2004 until 21 March 2007.

During the Muhammad cartoons controversy, Vilén demanded that the images be taken down by Suomen Sisu, one organization that published the cartoons on their website.

=== Ambassador ===
On 9 December 2006, Vilén announced that he would not run for re-election because he hoped to move to international duties after the election.

In 2007, Vilén joined the Ministry for Foreign Affairs. That same year, he was appointed as the Finnish ambassador to Hungary. He was Finland's ambassador to Poland from 2012 until 2014, when he became the EU ambassador to the Council of Europe.

From October 2018 to March 2020, Vilén served as the Senior Advisor in arctic policy matters in the European Political Strategy Centre (EPSC), the in-house think tank of the Juncker Commission. In March 2020, Vilén became Finland's ambassador to Barents and the Northern Dimension in the Ministry of Foreign Affairs. After informing Russia of its dismissal from the Barents Euro-Arctic Council in March 2023, Vilén expressed a lack of trust in Russia. Russia formally withdrew from the council in September.

In May 2023, Vilén was appointed Finland's ambassador to Canada, and he assumed this position on 1 September 2023.

In February 2024, the Ministry of Foreign Affairs received complaints of inappropriate behaviour and sexual harassment by Vilén. He apologized for his actions but denied wrongdoing. Vilén was relocated to Helsinki in June.

Also in June, police began investigating 37,000 euros of claimed expenses that the Ministry alleges were spent illegitimately. The preliminary investigation into fraud and breach of duty was completed on 1 November, whereupon the case was referred to prosecutors. On 30 June 2025, the prosecutor decided that there were no probable grounds to suspect Vilén of intentional fraud or misconduct in office.

Since July 2024, Vilén has been based in Finland in the Ministry for Foreign Affairs, where he serves as a Senior Foreign Affairs Adviser in expert duties within the Unit for East Asia and Oceania and as Finland’s Special Envoy for the Indo-Pacific with responsibility for the planning and coordination of Finland’s Indo-Pacific policy.

Finland’s first comprehensive Indo-Pacific policy was published on 15 June 2026. It outlines Finland’s objectives in the Indo-Pacific region, including advancing foreign and security policy goals, supporting the rules-based international order, and strengthening regional stability and security.

The policy also addresses changes in the regional security environment, increasing geopolitical competition and their implications for European and Indo-Pacific security. In addition, it highlights the region’s growing economic importance and Finland’s aim to deepen political, economic and technological cooperation. The policy is linked to the European Union’s Indo-Pacific strategy.

== Personal life ==
In 2005, Vilén married Janina Koski. At the time of their marriage, she worked as a parliamentary assistant to Janina Andersson, a member of the Finnish Parliament representing the Green League. Their divorce was announced in 2009.

Vilén married again in 2011 in Budapest, this time to Eva Söregi, the head of cabinet of the former president of the Hungarian Parliament, Katalin Szili. They had a son on 10 December 2017.

== Publications ==
- Jokisipilä, Markku; Vilén, Jari (23 January 2020). Kiitoskortti Hitleriltä. Minerva kustannus. ISBN 9789523750272.
- Vilén, Jari (27 September 2021). Suurlähettiläänä kuohuvassa Keski-Euroopassa. Minerva kustannus. ISBN 9789523753655.
