= Lipponen II cabinet =

67th cabinet of Finland

Lipponen's Second Cabinet
- 67th Cabinet of Finland

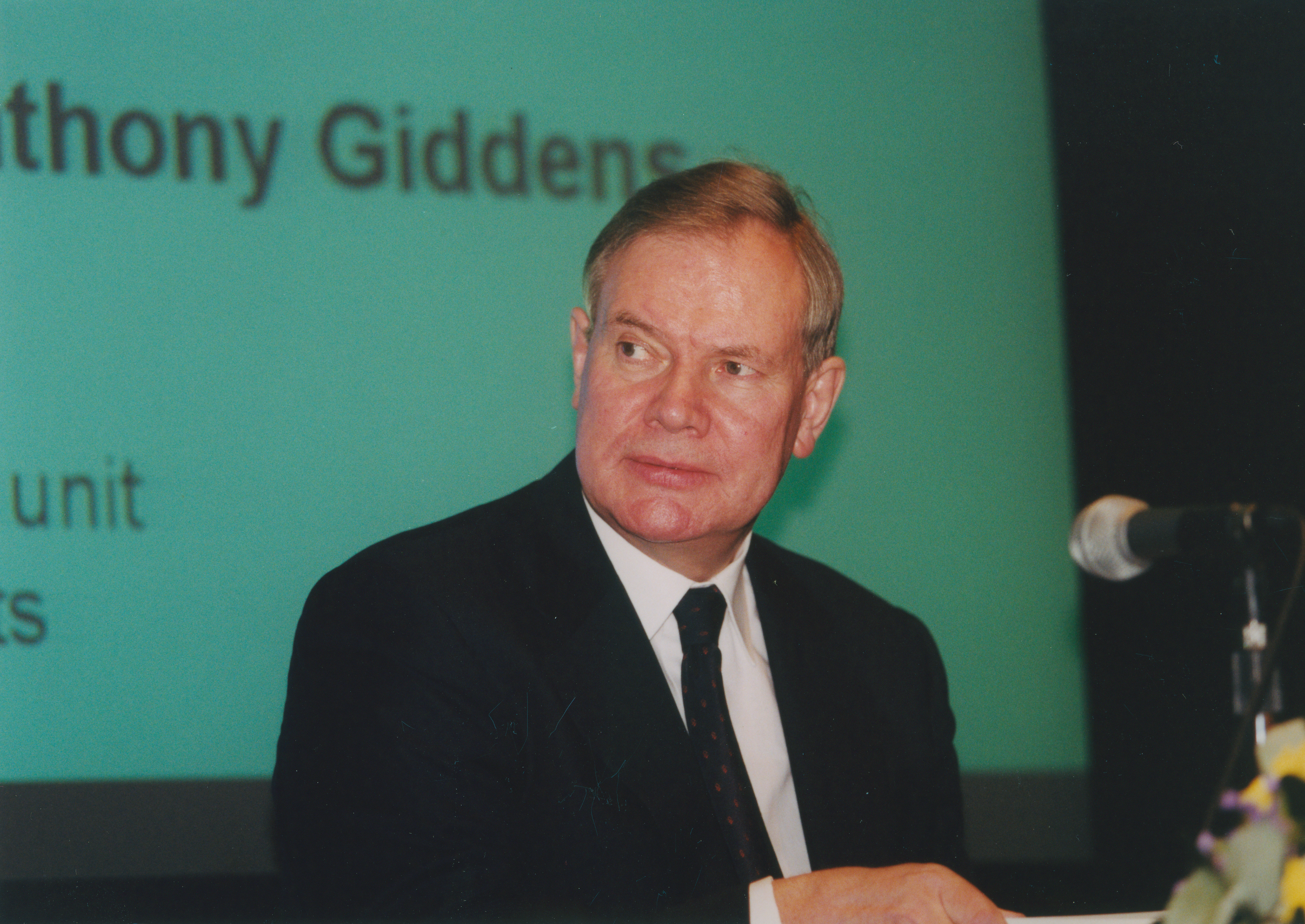
- Paavo Lipponen in February 2002
- Date established: 15 April 1999
- Date dissolved: 17 April 2003

Leadership and composition
- Head of state: Martti Ahtisaari; Tarja Halonen
- Head of government: Paavo Lipponen
- Member parties: National Coalition Party; Social Democratic Party; Green League (until 31 May 2002); Swedish People's Party; Left Alliance
- Status in legislature: Majority (coalition)
- Opposition party: Center; Christian League; Reform; Finns

Formation and history
- Election: 1999 Finnish parliamentary election
- Predecessor: Paavo Lipponen's first cabinet
- Successor: Anneli Jäätteenmäki's Cabinet

Paavo Lipponen's second cabinet was the 67th government of Finland. The cabinet was in office from 15 April 1999 to 17 April 2003. It was a center-left majority government, despite the center-right National Coalition Party's inclusion in the cabinet.

The Green League left the government on 31 May 2002 in protest of the government's decision to build the country's fifth nuclear power plant.

Portfolio	Minister	Took office	Left office	Party
Prime Minister	Paavo Lipponen	15 April 1999	17 April 2003	SDP
Minister for Foreign Affairs	Tarja Halonen	15 April 1999	25 February 2000	SDP
Minister for Foreign Affairs	Erkki Tuomioja	25 February 2000	17 April 2003	SDP
Minister of Justice	Johannes Koskinen	15 April 1999	17 April 2003	SDP
Minister of the Interior	Kari Häkämies	15 April 1999	1 June 2000	National Coalition
Minister of the Interior	Ville Itälä	1 June 2000	17 April 2003	National Coalition
Minister of Defence	Jan-Erik Enestam	15 April 1999	17 April 2003	RKP
Minister of Finance	Sauli Niinistö	15 April 1999	17 April 2003	National Coalition
Coordinate Minister of Finance	Suvi-Anne Siimes	15 April 1999	17 April 2003	Left Alliance
Minister of Education	Maija Rask	15 April 1999	17 April 2003	SDP
Minister of Agriculture and Forestry	Kalevi Hemilä	15 April 1999	1 February 2002	Neutral
Minister of Agriculture and Forestry	Jari Koskinen	1 February 2002	31 May 2002	Neutral
Minister of Transport	Olli-Pekka Heinonen	15 April 1999	17 April 2003	National Coalition
Minister of Transport and Communications	Olli-Pekka Heinonen	1 October 2000	4 January 2002	National Coalition
Minister of Transport and Communications	Kimmo Sasi	4 January 2002	17 April 2003	National Coalition
Minister of Trade and Industry	Erkki Tuomioja	15 April 1999	25 February 2000	SDP
Minister of Trade and Industry	Sinikka Mönkäre	25 February 2000	17 April 2003	SDP
Minister of Social Affairs and Health	Maija Perho	15 April 1999	17 April 2003	National Coalition
Minister of Health and Social Services	Eva Biaudet	15 April 1999	25 April 2000	RKP
Minister of Health and Social Services	Osmo Soininvaara	25 April 2000	19 April 2002	Green
Minister of Health and Social Services	Eva Biaudet	19 April 2002	17 April 2003	RKP
Minister of Labour	Sinikka Mönkäre	15 April 1999	25 February 2000	SDP
Minister of Labour	Tarja Filatov	25 February 2000	17 April 2003	SDP
Minister of the Environment	Satu Hassi	15 April 1999	31 May 2002	Green
Minister of the Environment	Jouni Backman	31 May 2002	17 May 2003	SDP
Minister of Culture	Suvi Lindén	15 April 1999	5 June 2002	National Coalition
Minister of Culture	Kaarina Dromberg	5 June 2002	17 April 2003	National Coalition
Minister of Regional and Municipal Affairs	Martti Korhonen	15 April 1999	17 April 2003	Left Alliance
Minister of Foreign Trade	Kimmo Sasi	15 April 1999	4 January 2002	National Coalition
Minister of Foreign Trade	Jari Vilén	4 January 2002	17 April 2003	National Coalition

== See also ==
- Paavo Lipponen's first cabinet

Preceded by Paavo Lipponen's first cabinet	Cabinet of Finland; April 15, 1999 – April 17, 2003	Succeeded by Anneli Jäätteenmäki's Cabinet
