= Kari Häkämies =

Finnish lawyer, novelist and politician (born 1956)

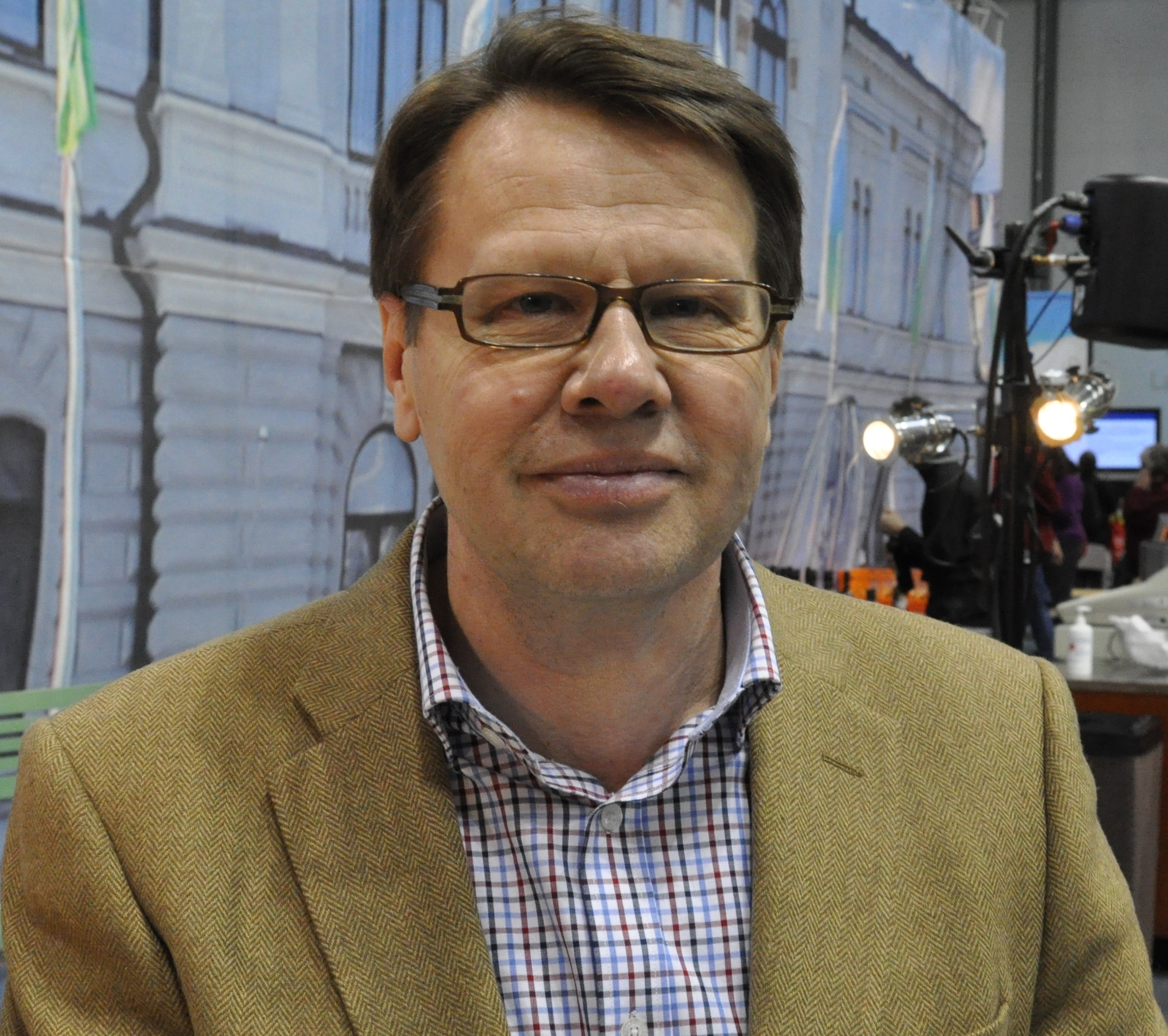

Minister of Interior
- In office 15 April 1999 – 30 August 2000
- Prime Minister: Paavo Lipponen
- Preceded by: Jan-Erik Enestam
- Succeeded by: Ville Itälä

Minister of Justice
- In office 2 February 1996 – 12 March 1998
- Prime Minister: Paavo Lipponen
- Preceded by: Jussi Järventaus

Personal details
- Born: Kari Pekka Häkämies; 1956 (age 69–70) Karhula, Finland
- Party: National Coalition Party
- Education: University of Helsinki
- Occupation: Lawyer; Novelist
- Writing career
- Language: Finnish language
- Genre: Political thriller novels

Kari Häkämies (born 1956) is a Finnish lawyer and politician being a member of the National Coalition Party. He served as the justice minister and interior minister and was elected to the Finnish Parliament. He is also the author of several political thriller novels first of which was published in 2010.

== Biography ==
Häkämies was born in Karhula in 1956. He received a degree in law from University of Helsinki in 1982.

Häkämies works as a lawyer. He is part of the National Coalition Party. He served as the justice minister between 2 February 1996 and 12 March 1998 in the first cabinet of Paavo Lipponen. Häkämies was elected as mayor of Kuopio in 1998 and held the post until 2001. He was appointed minister of interior to the second cabinet of Lipponen on 15 April 1999. Häkämies resigned from the office on 30 August 2000 and was replaced by Ville Itälä in the post on 1 September.

Häkämies was first elected to the Finnish Parliament on 2 March 1987. His parliamentary tenure ended on 31 July 1998. He is the chairman of the Regional Council of Southwest Finland or region mayor of Southwest Finland.
