= Anneli Jäätteenmäki =

Prime minister of Finland in 2003

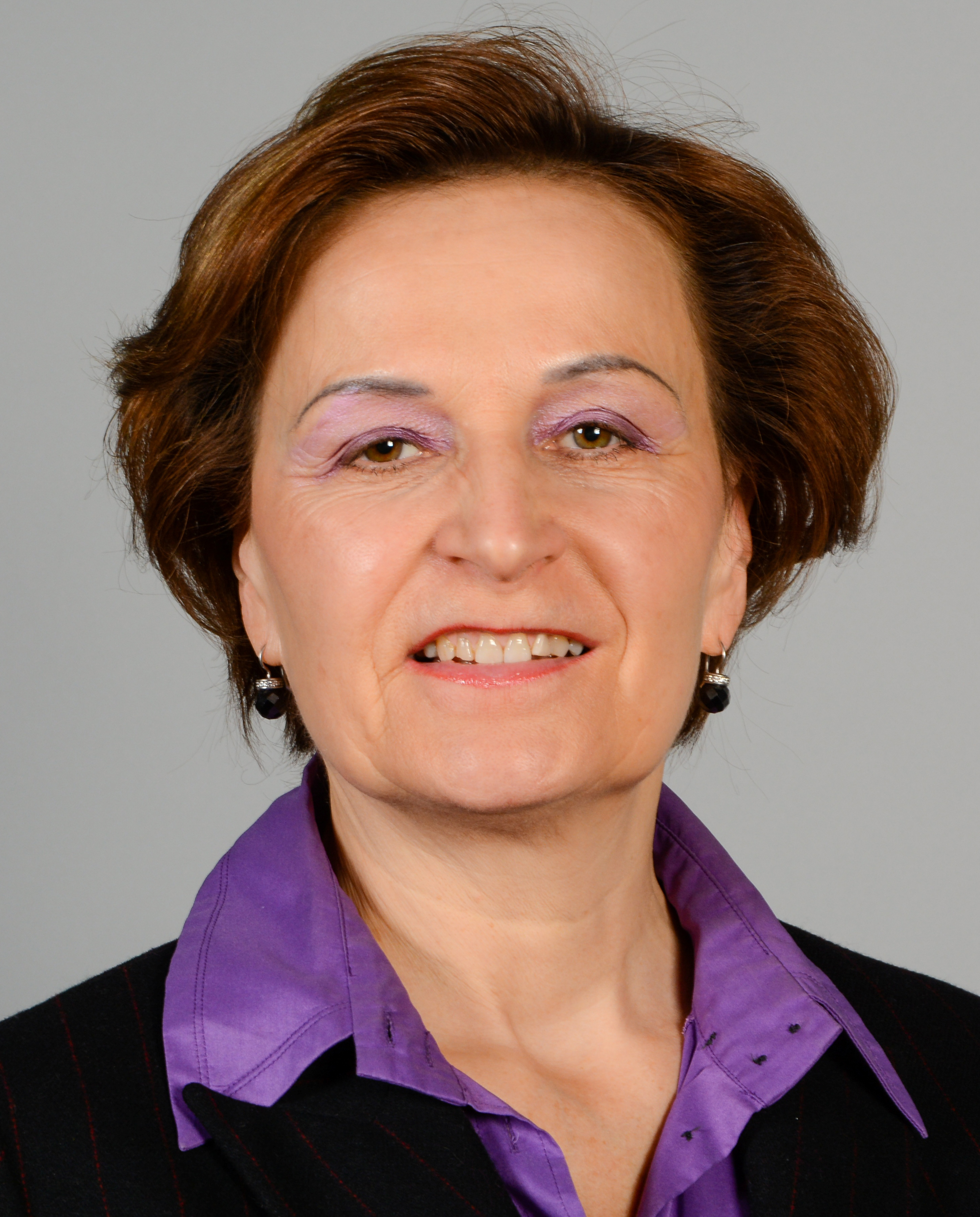
- Official portrait, 2014

39th Prime Minister of Finland
- In office 17 April 2003 – 24 June 2003
- President: Tarja Halonen
- Deputy: Antti Kalliomäki
- Preceded by: Paavo Lipponen
- Succeeded by: Matti Vanhanen

Minister of Justice
- In office 1 May 1994 – 13 April 1995
- Prime Minister: Esko Aho
- Preceded by: Hannele Pokka
- Succeeded by: Sauli Niinistö

Personal details
- Born: Anneli Tuulikki Jäätteenmäki; 11 February 1955 (age 71) Lapua, Finland
- Party: Centre Party
- Spouse: Jorma Melleri
- Children: 2
- Education: University of Helsinki
- Website: annelijäätteenmäki.net

Video-Introduction

Anneli Tuulikki Jäätteenmäki (born 11 February 1955) is a Finnish politician who was the first female and 39th prime minister of Finland from 17 April 2003 to 24 June 2003. From 2004 until 2019, she served as a Member of the European Parliament (MEP) from Finland.

== Background and career ==
Jäätteenmäki was born on a small farm in the forests of South Ostrobothnia in Finland. Her brother was to take over the farm, so the daughters of the family went to school. Jäätteenmäki became a member of the Centre Party and was active in student politics. She earned a master's degree in law in 1980 and worked as a lawyer for the party's parliamentary group from 1981 until 1987, when she was elected to the Finnish Parliament (Eduskunta). Jäätteenmäki was Minister of Justice from 1994 to 1995, then her party became part of the opposition. She was elected as chairwoman of the Centre Party of Finland from 18 June 2000 to 5 October 2003, although the first year was as acting leader during Esko Aho's sabbatical leave to lecture at Harvard University.

== Prime minister ==
After eight years in opposition, she led the Centre Party of Finland to a narrow victory over the formerly largest party, the Social Democratic Party of Finland, in the parliamentary elections of 2003. According to the new constitution, which was in effect for the first time after this election, she was thereby given the first opportunity to form a new Cabinet. After successful coalition negotiations with the Social Democrats and the Swedish People's Party, she came to head a coalition cabinet which chiefly continued on the lines of its predecessor, Paavo Lipponen's second Cabinet, but introduced new measures to stimulate the economy, including tax cuts.

During her brief time in office, Finland was the only country in the world to have women as both prime minister and president, a situation underlined by the fact that half her cabinet were women; but at the same time there was another country, New Zealand, whose head of state Queen Elizabeth II (in office 1952-2022), her New Zealand representative Governor-General Silvia Cartwright (in office 2001-6), Prime Minister Helen Clark (in office 1999–2008) and Chief Justice Sian Elias (in office 1999–2019) were all female. (Anneli Jäätteenmäki's short term as Prime Minister of Finland is, however, not the shortest in the history of Finland. Beside caretaker cabinets and temporary prime ministers appointed due to the death or disease of the predecessor, Juho Heikki Vennola headed a Cabinet which lasted only for a little more than a month February–March 1931, in connection with the Lapua Movement's vociferous anti-democratic demands for influence on the presidential election.)

== Resignation ==
Anneli Jäätteenmäki resigned on 18 June 2003, under pressure resulting from the accusation that she had lied to Parliament and the public over how she had acquired confidential Foreign Ministry documents which she used for political purposes during the election campaign. The documents contained diplomatic information from a meeting between United States President George W. Bush and Finland's prime minister Paavo Lipponen about Finland's position regarding the U.S.'s Iraq war. Jäätteenmäki used the information to suggest that her rival, the Social Democrat leader Paavo Lipponen, had secretly offered Finnish support for the U.S.-led coalition, a substantial breach of the official policy of neutrality in Finland's foreign politics, and thus associated Finland with what many Finns considered an illegal war of aggression. Jäätteenmäki broke the traditional unity and silence behind Finland's security policies. As the elections turned out to be close, the defeated Social Democrats found reasons to suspect that her nontraditional campaign tactic was decisive in determining the outcome, which soured the relationship between the two major coalition partners.

After the leaked documents were published in several newspapers in March, the police launched a criminal investigation based on the Official Secrets Act. On 11 June Prime Minister Jäätteenmäki was heard as a witness by the police, which led to increasing pressure on her to come clean on her role in the leak. The same week, the incriminating minutes of a meeting of Centre Party leaders were leaked to the press, as later came clear, via the Centre Party second vice-chairman Hannu Takkula. On 16 June it came to light that a presidential aide, Martti Manninen, affiliated with the Centre Party, had leaked the foreign ministry documents. On 18 June Jäätteenmäki gave her "full explanation" to Parliament and apologised to the President, claiming that she had been faxed the documents without asking for them, and that she had not known of their secrecy. The Parliament was not satisfied with her account, and once Manninen (the same afternoon) publicly claimed that Jäätteenmäki had specifically and forcefully asked for the information, and that he would be able to prove it, her coalition partners made it clear that they had no trust in her leadership. She resigned the same evening, citing the lack of political trust, and without admitting any wrongdoing.

Consequently, she announced on 24 June that she would resign as leader of the Centre Party. Matti Vanhanen was elected as the new party leader on 5 October, and he succeeded her as prime minister.

The police investigation into the leak concluded, on 19 December 2003, that Jäätteenmäki should be prosecuted for aiding or abetting Manninen in revealing state secrets in contravention of the law. However, on 19 March 2004, the Helsinki District Court acquitted Jäätteenmäki on all counts.

== Member of European Parliament ==
Jäätteenmäki served as an MEP for the Centre Party in the European Parliament. In the 2004 European Parliament elections, she received over 140,000 votes, the highest individual tally and approximately 8% of all votes cast.

In April 2006, Jäätteenmäki announced to the Finnish media that she was going to take some time out of her parliamentary work due to breast cancer, but she returned to politics following her successful recovery. Despite offers to return to Finnish national politics, she declined to become a candidate in the Finnish Parliament elections in 2007. She was reelected to the European Parliament in the 2009 European Parliament elections with the second highest tally of votes in Finland after Timo Soini.

She was reelected to the European Parliament for a third time and final term in 2014.

== Cabinets ==
- Jäätteenmäki Cabinet

Political offices
Preceded by Hannele Pokka	Minister of Justice; 1994–1995	Succeeded by Sauli Niinistö
Preceded by Riitta Uosukainen	Speaker of Parliament; 2003	Succeeded by Liisa Jaakonsaari; Acting
Preceded by Paavo Lipponen	Prime Minister of Finland; 2003	Succeeded by Matti Vanhanen
