= OPH =

OPH may refer to:

- Aryldialkylphosphatase, an enzyme
- Ophiuchus, a constellation
- Original Pancake House, an American restaurant chain
- Finnish National Agency for Education (Finnish: Opetushallitus, OPH)
