= Jukka Mikkola =

Finnish politician and lawyer (1943–2018)

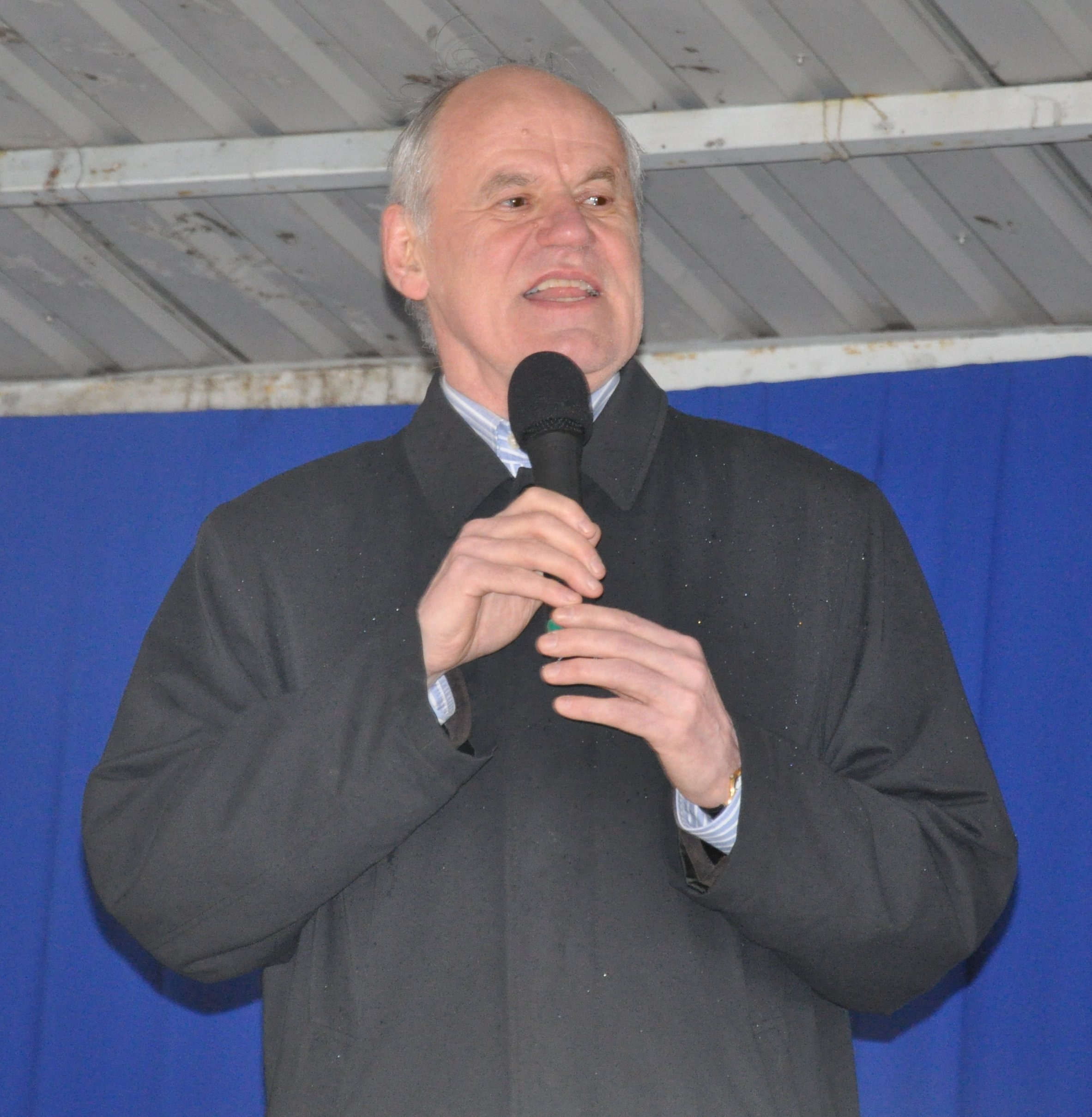
Jukka Mikkola

Jukka Mikkola (3 July 1943 – 23 March 2018) was a Finnish politician from the Social Democratic Party. He was a lawyer and has the title Master of Laws.

Although born in Vampula, Mikkola has participated in politics in Turku. He was member of the parliament from 1983 to 1986 and again from 1995 to 2003. Mikkola was elected to the position of the speaker of the parliament for a short term in 1999 after general elections. He continued as the second deputy speaker of the parliament for the remaining term 1999–2003. He continued in municipal politics in Turku after he left the parliament.

Mikkola left politics due to health issues in 2016. He died after a long illness in Turku on 23 March 2018, aged 74.

Political offices
Preceded by Riitta Uosukainen	Speaker of the Parliament of Finland; March–April 1999	Succeeded by Riitta Uosukainen
