= Pekka Hämäläinen (footballer) =

Finnish footballer (1938-2013)

President of Football Association of Finland
- In office 1997–2009
- Preceded by: Pentti Seppälä
- Succeeded by: Sauli Niinistö

Personal details
- Born: 25 October 1938 Helsinki, Finland
- Died: 4 June 2013 (aged 74)
- Height: Helsinki, Finland
- Occupation: Footballer; Football administrator

Pekka Hämäläinen (25 October 1938 – 4 June 2013) was a Finnish association football player and administrator.

== Career ==
Hämäläinen played for HIFK, winning the national championship in 1961, and playing for them in the 1962–63 European Cup.

He was the President of the Football Association of Finland between 1997 and 2009.

== Honours ==
HIFK

- Mestaruussarja: 1961

Individual

- Football Association of Finland Captain's Ball: 2011
