= Timo Kalli =

Finnish politician (born 1947)

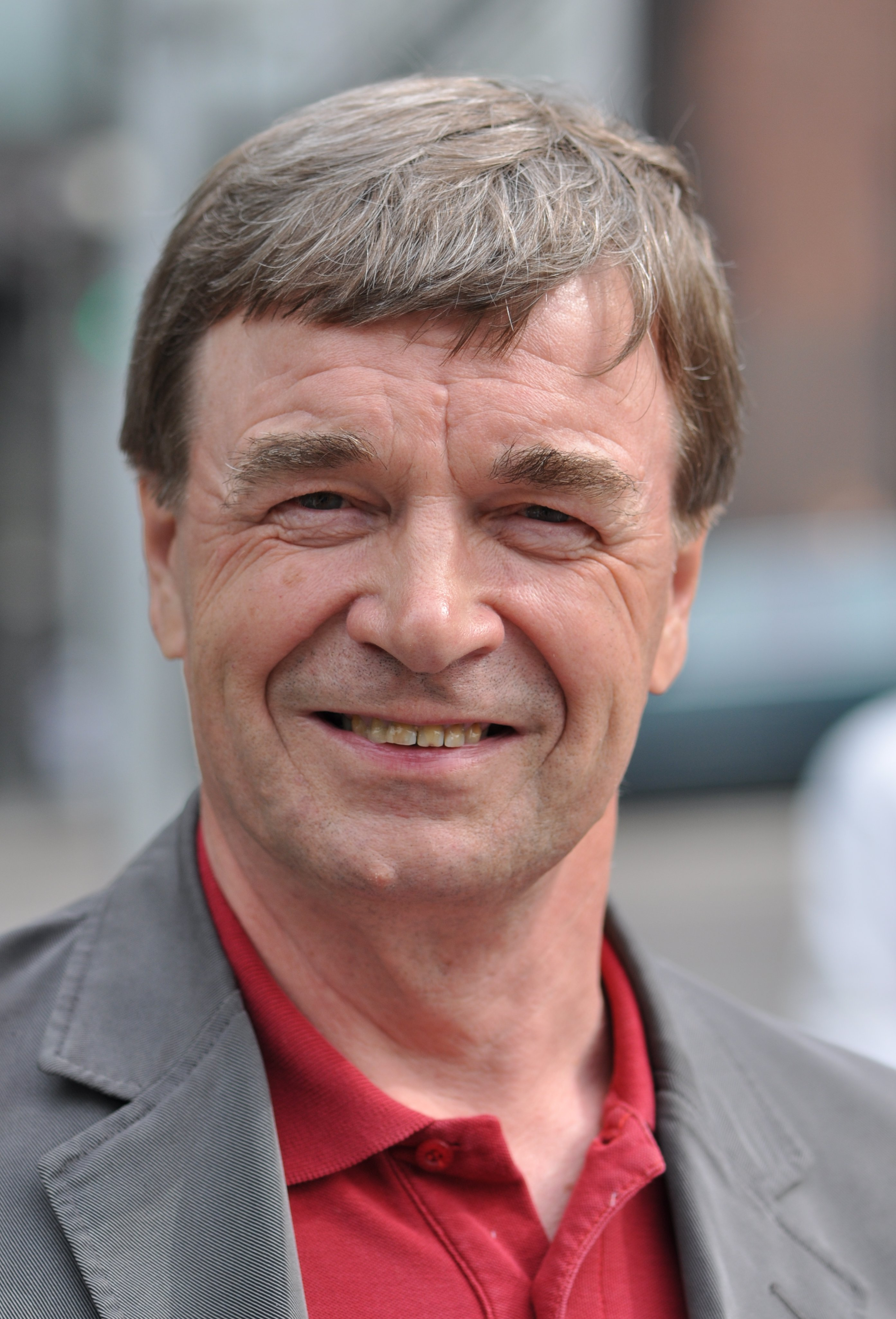
- Timo Kalli in June 2009

Speaker of the Parliament of Finland
- In office 27 March 2007 – 20 April 2007
- Preceded by: Paavo Lipponen
- Succeeded by: Sauli Niinistö

Member of the Finnish Parliament for Satakunta
- In office 22 March 1991 – 16 April 2019

Personal details
- Born: February 22, 1947 (age 79) Kiukainen, Finland
- Party: Centre Party
- Spouse: Ritva Uusitalo (m. 1969)
- Profession: Farmer

Timo Juhani Kalli (born 22 February 1947 in Kiukainen, now Eura, Satakunta) is a Finnish former politician from the Centre Party. He is a farmer by profession.

Kalli was a member of parliament between 1991 and 2019, and held the position of the speaker of the parliament for a short period in 2007 following that year's general elections. He was also the chairman of Center Party parliamentary group between 2003 and 2011.

Political offices
Preceded by Paavo Lipponen	Speaker of the Parliament of Finland; March–April 2007	Succeeded by Sauli Niinistö
