= Riitta Uosukainen =

Finnish politician (born 1942)

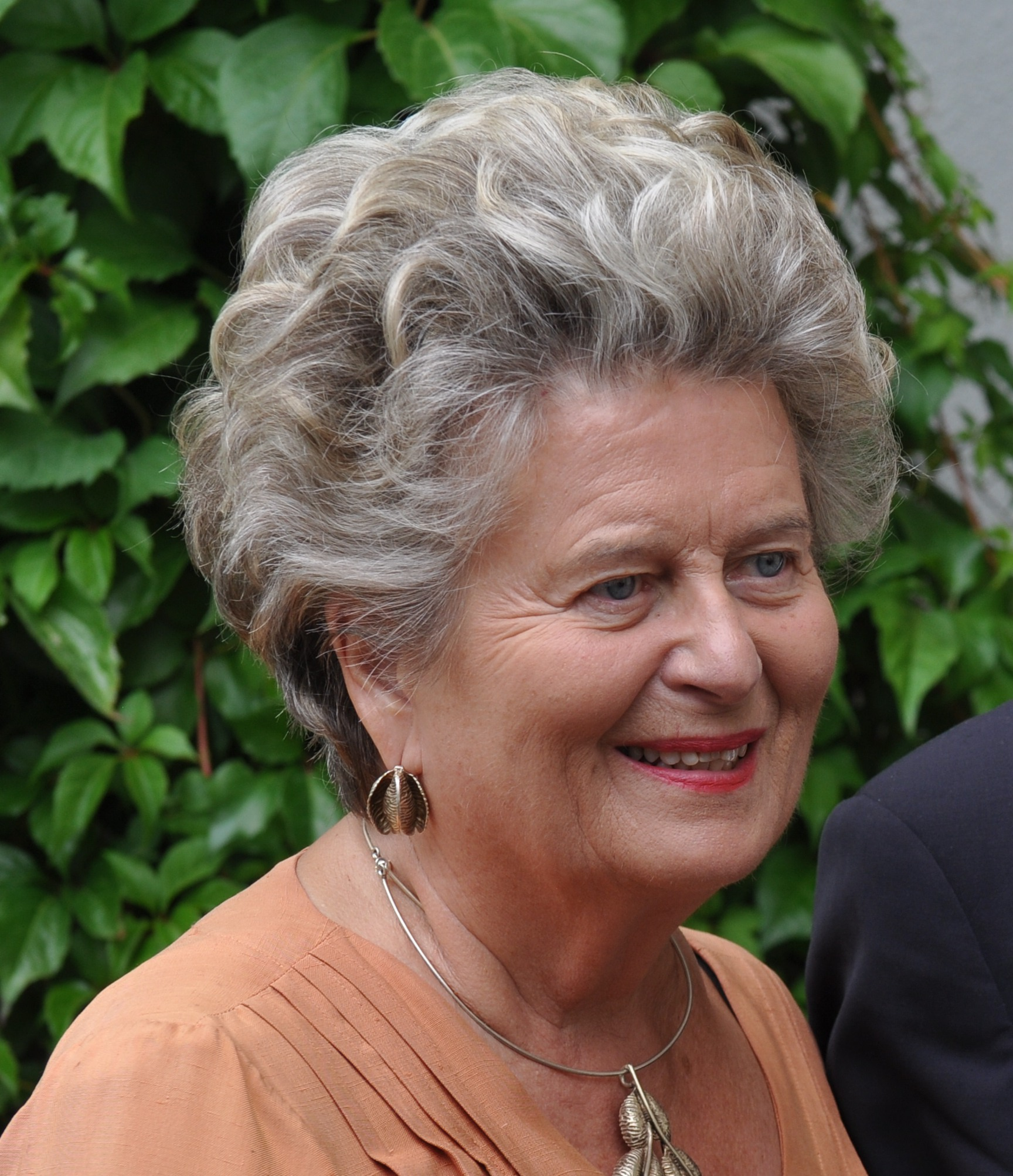
- Riitta Uosukainen in 2013

Speaker of the Parliament of Finland
- In office 7 February 1994 – 21 April 1995
- In office 7 February 1995 – 23 March 1999
- In office 20 April 1999 – 18 March 2003

Minister of Education
- In office 26 April 1991 – 10 February 1994
- Preceded by: Ole Norrback
- Succeeded by: Olli-Pekka Heinonen

Member of the Finnish Parliament
- In office 26 March 1983 – 18 March 2003
- Constituency: Kymi

Personal details
- Born: Riitta Maria Vainikka; 18 April 1942 (age 84) Jääski, Finland
- Party: National Coalition Party
- Education: University of Helsinki

Riitta Maria Uosukainen (née Vainikka; 18 June 1942) is a Finnish politician and former Member of Parliament. She is one of the nine people to gain the highest honorary title, Counselor of State, given by the President, and is one of two currently alive alongside Matti Vanhanen.

== Early life ==
She was born on 18 June 1942 in Jääski, which was part of the Viipuri Province in Finland at the time of her birth, but is now known as Svetogorsk in Leningrad Oblast, Russia. Uosukainen worked as editor of the Kustannus Oy Tammi publishing house 1965–1966, before beginning university studies. She graduated with a Licentiate in Philosophy in 1970. She also worked as a teacher from 1969, becoming a Senior Teacher in 1971. She continued her career in education by becoming a Lecturer in Finnish language didactics at the University of Joensuu in 1976. She also served as Regional Teacher Educator in Finnish from 1976 to 1983.

== Political career ==
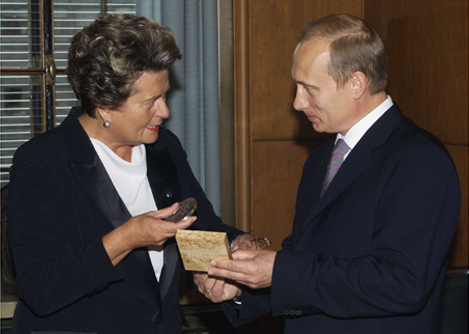
Uosukainen and Vladimir Putin in 2001

She began her political career in 1977 when she was elected to Imatra Town Council, retaining that post until 1992, before being elected to the Finnish Parliament in 1983 for the National Coalition Party. She remained as a member of parliament until 2003.

Uosukainen was Minister of Education (1991–1994), National Coalition Party presidential candidate in 2000, and Speaker of the Finnish Parliament almost continuously from 1994 to 2003. After the death of Queen Elizabeth II, she praised King Charles III while also commenting on the Russian invasion of Ukraine. She drew a comparison of Putin to Adolf Hitler, and stated that the situation felt good in Ukraine after the mobilization backlash and the success of the 2022 Kharkiv counteroffensive in September.

Political offices
Preceded by Ilkka Suominen	Speaker of the Parliament of Finland; 1994	Succeeded by Paavo Lipponen
Preceded by Paavo Lipponen	Speaker of the Parliament of Finland; 1995–1998	Succeeded by Jukka Mikkola
Preceded by Jukka Mikkola	Speaker of the Parliament of Finland; 1999–2003	Succeeded by Anneli Jäätteenmäki

== See also ==
- Riitta Uosukainen in 375 humanists – 20 April 2015. Faculty of Arts, University of Helsinki.
