= Finnish National Agency for Education =

- Opetushallitus
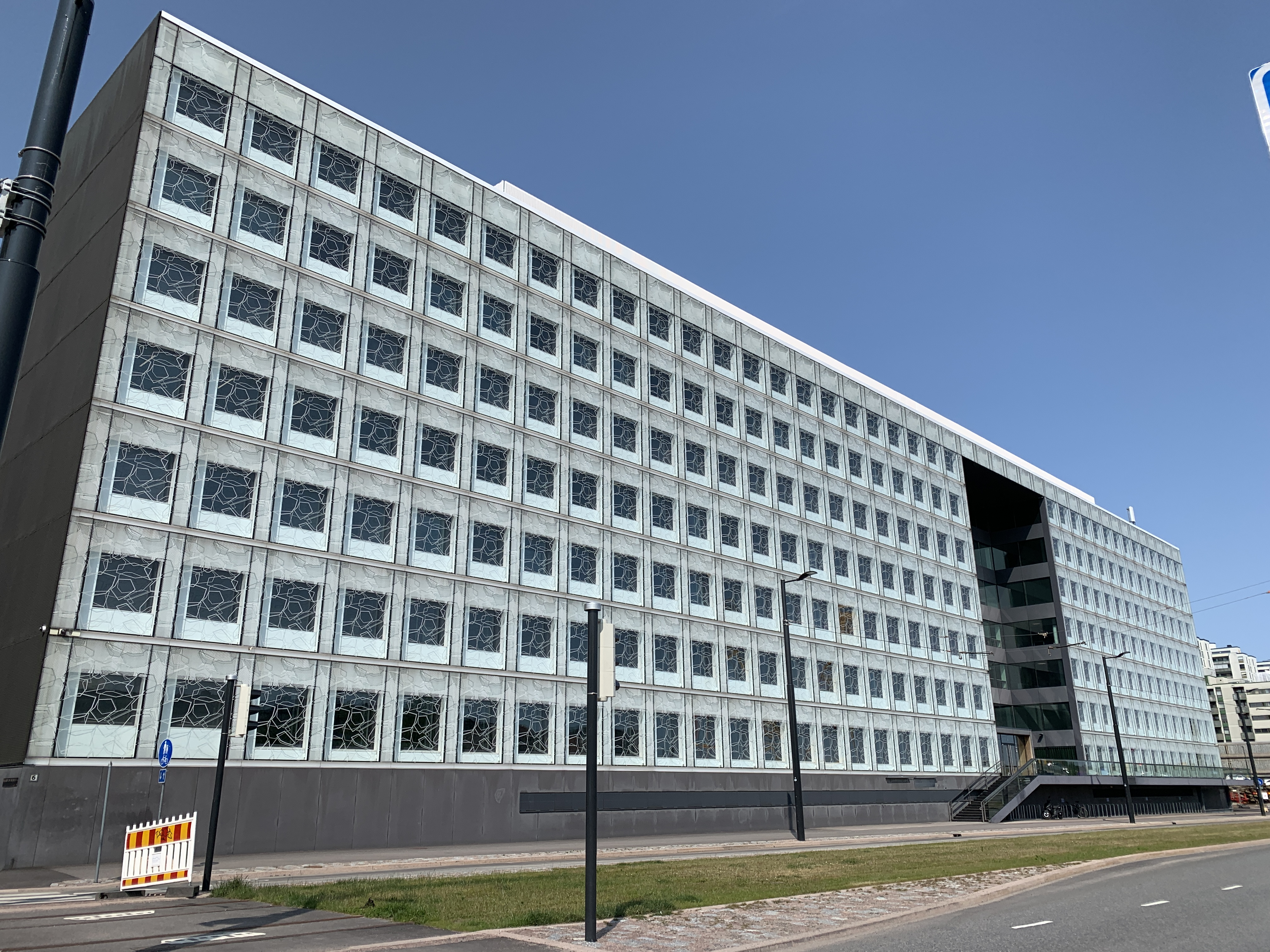
- OPH's office is in Siltasaari, Helsinki.
- Abbreviation: OPH
- Formation: 1991
- Founder: Finnish Ministry of Education and Culture
- Purpose: development of Finnish Education
- Location: Siltasaari, Finland
- Official language: Finnish, Suomi, English
- Owner: Finnish Ministry of Education and Culture
- CEO: Minna Kelhä (2021-)
- Parent organization: Finnish Ministry of Education and Culture
- Website: https://www.oph.fi

The Finnish National Agency for Education (OPH, Opetushallitus) is a Finnish agency under the Ministry of Education and Culture, responsible for the development of early childhood education, pre-school and basic education, morning and afternoon activities, upper secondary education, basic vocational education, adult education, liberal arts and basic arts education. It also supports the development of education and the internationalisation of Finnish society.

== History ==
It was established on 1 April 1991, when the National Board of Education and the National Board of Vocational Education, which had been operating as central agencies, were merged. The aim was to centralise all matters relating to education in one central agency. The goal for the new agency to focus on developing the objectives, content and methods of education, as well as monitoring and promoting the effectiveness of education.

The State Audiovisual Centre, which operated under the National Board of Education, was closed down in 1994 and its tasks were divided between the National Board of Education and the Finnish Broadcasting Corporation, Yle.

The Centre for International Mobility and Cooperation (CIMO) and the National Board of Education merged to form the new National Agency for Education in early 2017.

== Activity ==
The Finnish National Agency for Education prepares the basic curricula for basic education and upper secondary education, leads the preparation of the basic curricula for vocational qualifications and determines the qualification criteria for qualifications included in the qualification structure. It participates in the preparation of regulations concerning its field of activity and issues regulations, instructions and recommendations related to the implementation of the regulations.

In addition, Opetushallitus maintains the student selection register for secondary education, polytechnics and universities, organizes language examinations, organizes and finances further training for teachers and other education personnel and is responsible for the recognition of foreign qualifications.

Another of its tasks is to support the internationalisation of Finnish society, for example by implementing programmes and agreements that promote internationalisation and by producing information related to internationalisation.

The agency coordinates education information system, registry and data repository services, produces education indicators and forecasting information, collects and produces information on the state subsidy system for education and culture, and develops and produces low-circulation educational materials.

There are six state educational institutions under the Opetushallitus, which are performance-oriented. The educational institutions include a general education special education school, the Valteri learning and guidance centre, two language schools (Helsinki French-Finnish School and Finnish-Russian School), the Helsinki European School and two vocational educational institutions (Sámi Regional Training Centre and Meriturva). In addition to state educational institutions, the State School Boarding School is subject to the performance-oriented management of the Finnish National Agency for Education.

== Directors ==
- Kari Pitkänen (vs.) 1991–1991
- Vilho Hirvi 1991–1994
- Rauno Jarnila (ma.) 1995–1995
- Jukka Sarjala 1995–2002
- Heli Kuusi (ma.) 2003–2003
- Kirsi Lindroos 2003–2007
- Timo Lankinen 2008–2011
- Aulis Pitkälä 2012–2016
- Olli-Pekka Heinonen 2016–2021
- Minna Kelhä 2021–today
