= Sauli Niinistö =

President of Finland from 2012 to 2024

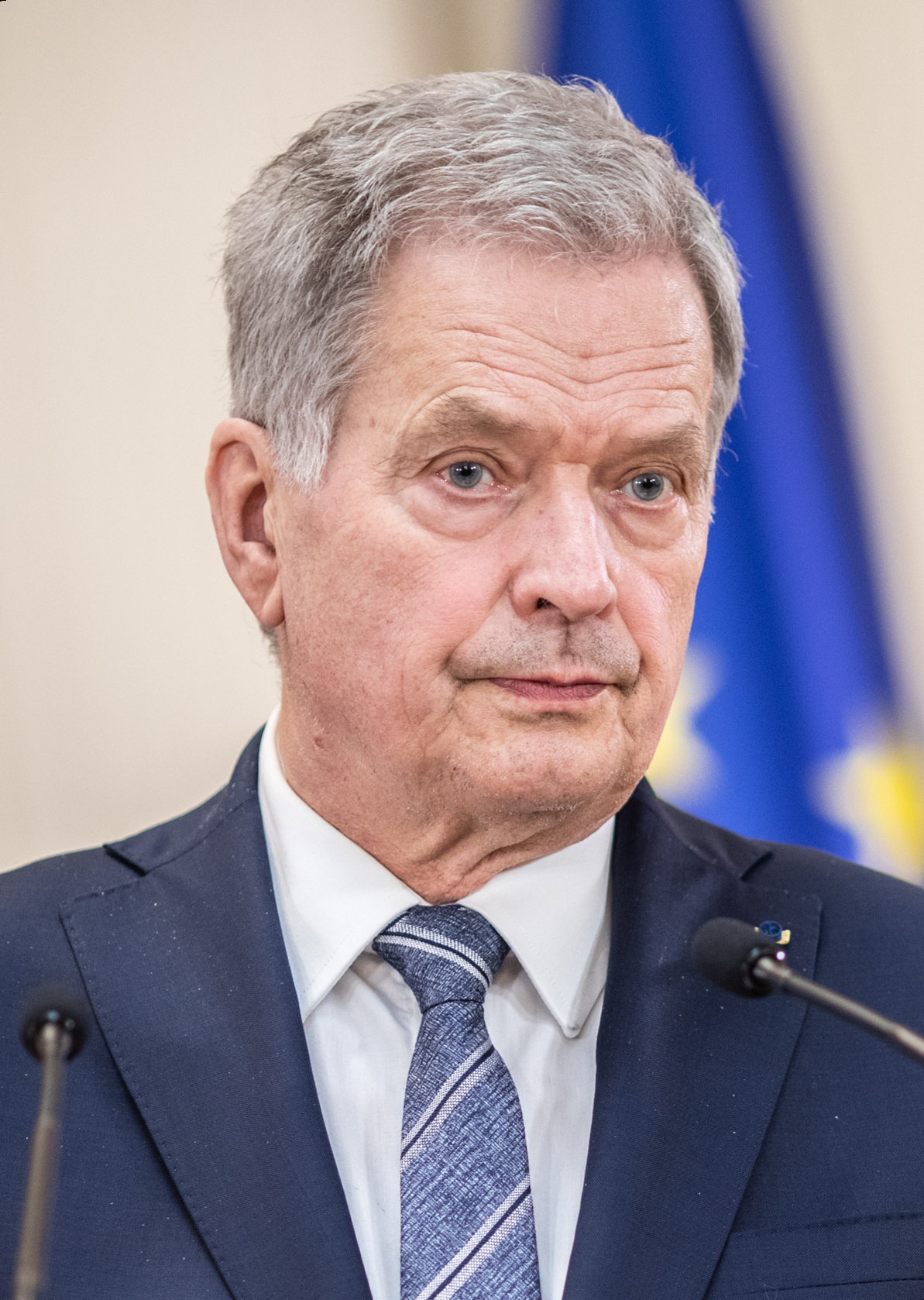
- Niinistö in 2022

12th President of Finland
- In office 1 March 2012 – 1 March 2024
- Prime Minister: Jyrki Katainen; Alexander Stubb; Juha Sipilä; Antti Rinne; Sanna Marin; Petteri Orpo
- Preceded by: Tarja Halonen
- Succeeded by: Alexander Stubb

Speaker of the Parliament of Finland
- In office 24 April 2007 – 27 April 2011
- Preceded by: Timo Kalli
- Succeeded by: Ben Zyskowicz

Minister of Finance
- In office 2 February 1996 – 17 April 2003
- Prime Minister: Paavo Lipponen
- Preceded by: Iiro Viinanen
- Succeeded by: Antti Kalliomäki

Deputy Prime Minister of Finland
- In office 13 April 1995 – 30 August 2001
- Prime Minister: Paavo Lipponen
- Preceded by: Pertti Salolainen
- Succeeded by: Ville Itälä

Minister of Justice
- In office 13 April 1995 – 2 February 1996
- Prime Minister: Paavo Lipponen
- Preceded by: Anneli Jäätteenmäki
- Succeeded by: Kari Häkämies

Leader of the National Coalition Party
- In office 1994–2001
- Preceded by: Pertti Salolainen
- Succeeded by: Ville Itälä

Member of the Finnish Parliament
- In office 21 March 2007 – 19 April 2011
- Constituency: Uusimaa
- In office 21 March 1987 – 18 March 2003
- Constituency: Helsinki (1999–2003); Southwest Finland (1987–1999)

President of the Football Association of Finland
- In office 2009–2012
- Preceded by: Pekka Hämäläinen
- Succeeded by: Markku Lehtola (interim)

Personal details
- Born: Sauli Väinämö Niinistö; 24 August 1948 (age 78) Salo, Finland
- Party: Independent (since 2012); National Coalition (until 2012)
- Spouses: Marja-Leena Alanko (m. 1974; died 1995) Jenni Haukio (m. 2009)
- Children: 3
- Relatives: Ville Niinistö (nephew)
- Education: University of Turku

Military service
- Allegiance: Finland
- Branch/service: Finnish Army
- Rank: Captain

Sauli Väinämö Niinistö (Note: Finnish pronunciation: [ˈsɑu̯li ˈʋæinæmø ˈniːnistø]) (born 24 August 1948) is a Finnish politician who served as the president of Finland from 2012 to 2024.

A lawyer by education, Niinistö was Chairman of the National Coalition Party (NCP) from 1994 to 2001, Minister of Justice from 1995 to 1996, Minister of Finance from 1996 to 2003, Deputy Prime Minister from 1995 to 2001 and the NCP candidate in the 2006 presidential election. He served as the Speaker of the Parliament of Finland from 2007 to 2011 and has been the honorary president of the European People's Party (EPP) since 2002.

Niinistö was the NCP candidate in the 2012 presidential election, defeating Pekka Haavisto of the Green League with 62.6% of the vote in the decisive second round. Niinistö assumed office on 1 March 2012; he is the first NCP president since Juho Kusti Paasikivi, who left office in 1956. In May 2017, Niinistö announced that he would seek reelection in the 2018 presidential election, running as an independent candidate. The NCP and Christian Democrats (KD) supported his candidacy. He won reelection in the first round on 28 January 2018 with 62.7% of the vote and his second term began on 1 February 2018.

In a 2023 poll conducted by MTV Uutiset, Niinistö was ranked as Finland's greatest president of all time.

== Early life and education ==
Niinistö was born in Salo in 1948. His parents were the circulation manager of Salon Seudun Sanomat Väinö Niinistö (1911–1991) and nurse Hilkka Niinistö, née Heimo (1916–2014). Niinistö's godfather was Fjalar Nordell, founder of Salora.

Niinistö graduated from the Salon normaalilyseo high school in 1967, after which he went to study at the University of Turku. From there he graduated with a Master of Laws degree in 1974. He completed court training in 1977.

== Career ==
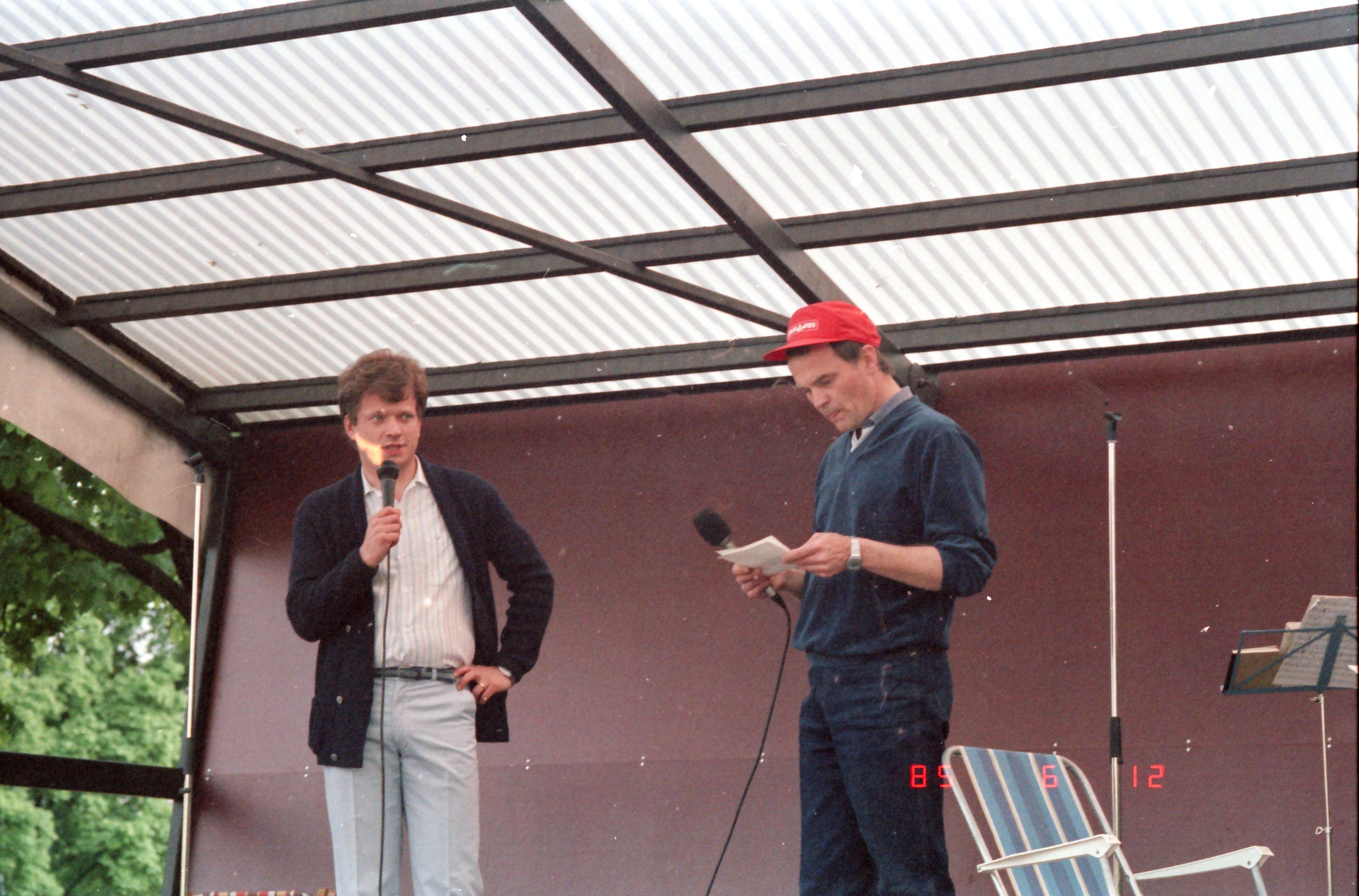
Niinistö in an interview in 1985

Niinistö ran his own law firm in Salo between 1978 and 1988 before entering national politics.

Niinistö served on the municipal council of Salo from 1977 to 1992 and was elected a Member of the Parliament of Finland from the district of Finland Proper in 1987. In 1994 he was chosen to lead the NCP as party chairman and subsequently became Justice Minister in Prime Minister Paavo Lipponen's first cabinet in 1995.

Switching portfolios, Niinistö became Finance Minister in 1996, continuing in Lipponen's second cabinet from 1999 to 2003. In both administrations, Niinistö was deputy prime minister under social democrat Lipponen. As Finance Minister, Niinistö was known for his strict fiscal policy. He was the first Finn to make a purchase with euros on 1 January 2002. Niinistö was urged by his party to stand as a candidate in the 2000 presidential election, but he refused the candidacy for completely related to his private life reasons. He announced his gradual retirement from politics in 2001, and he was succeeded that year by Ville Itälä as party leader. After the end of his term as a cabinet minister in 2003, Niinistö became vice president at the European Investment Bank.

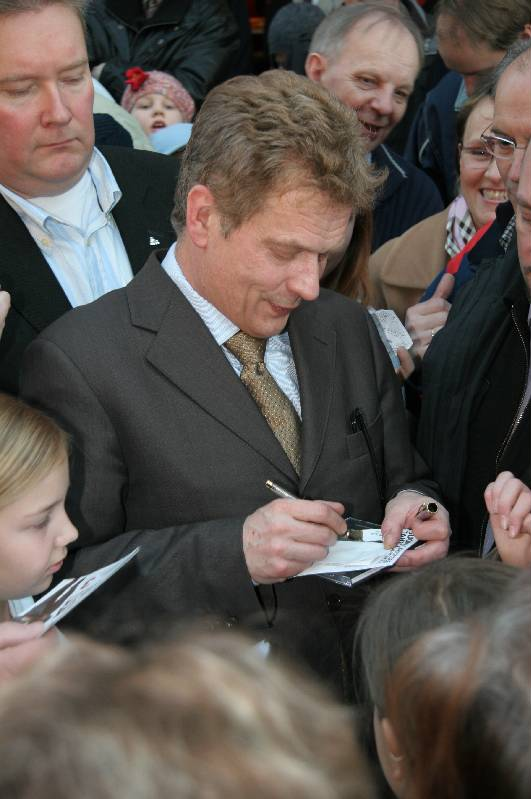
Niinistö in the 2006 Finnish presidential election

In March 2005, Niinistö announced his candidacy for the 2006 presidential election. He represented the NCP, challenging the incumbent President Tarja Halonen. He qualified for the second round runoff (as one of the top two candidates in the first round), held on 29 January 2006, but lost to Halonen. The costs of Niinistö's campaign were circa 2,225,000 euros, including 492,864 euros and 717,191 euros contributions from NCP. His financial declaration in 2006 was made more detailed in 2009 because of controversies.

In 2006, Niinistö announced that he was standing again for the 2007 parliamentary election. He said, however, that he had no plans to take any high-ranking political job such as the prime ministership in the future. He received 60,563 votes in the 2007 elections, a record in a Finnish parliamentary election; it was about 21% more than the 1948 record of Hertta Kuusinen. After the 2007 election, Niinistö decided to accept the position of the Speaker of the Parliament. Niinistö negotiated the merger of the European Democrat Union (EDU) into the EPP in 2002 and became its Honorary President.

Niinistö was elected as the president of the Football Association of Finland on 8 November 2009, replacing Pekka Hämäläinen, but the three-year term was interrupted when Niinistö was elected president of the republic.

== Presidency (2012–2024) ==
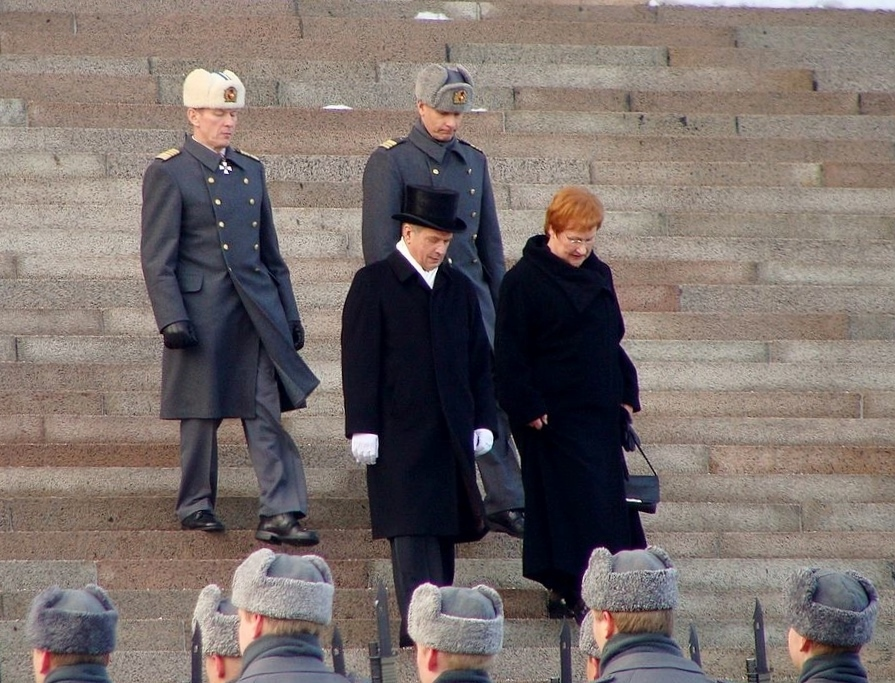
Sauli Niinistö leaving Parliament after receiving his presidency with outgoing President Tarja Halonen in March 2012

Niinistö was the NCP candidate for a second time in the 2012 presidential election. With 37.0% of the vote, he won the election's first round and faced off against Haavisto of the Green League in the decisive second round. He carried the second round with around 62.6% against Haavisto's 37.4%. Niinistö's margin of victory was larger than that of any previous directly elected president. He won a majority in 14 of 15 electoral districts. Niinistö's election budget was circa 1.2 million euros.

After becoming the President, Niinistö pledged to establish a special task force aiming at preventing alienation among the country's youth and expressed concern about the problems of sparsely populated rural areas. Niinistö stressed the significance of mutual understanding with the cabinet and Parliament. His acceptance speech thanked those who backed him in the campaign and those who disagreed with him. Niinistö said that the differing views expressed should be taken into consideration.

In May 2017, Niinistö announced that he would seek re-election in the 2018 presidential election, running as an independent candidate. His candidacy was soon supported by the National Coalition Party and Christian Democrats. In the election, Niinistö received 62.7% of the votes, becoming the first president in Finland to win the first round of an election by popular vote.

By 2022, Niinistö was estimated to have an approval rating of 92 percent, but rejected efforts by a grassroots movement to allow him to run for a third term.

=== Foreign policy ===
As President, Niinistö visited Russia and met with Russian President Vladimir Putin in February 2013 to promote bilateral trade (e.g. Shell, Cargotec, YIT). He discussed ice hockey and business, but not human rights issues or the selling of Russian military equipment to Syria and its transport through Finland. Niinistö's contacts with the Russian leader have led him to be dubbed as the "Putin whisperer" by some commentators.

At the same time as the sanctions against Russia, mainly caused by the Russian invasion in Crimea and eastern Ukraine, Niinistö said that the focus should be on easing tensions and increasing understanding between Europe and Russia. He stated that Finland should serve as a broker between Russia and Europe. He also stated that "Russia understands that the conflict in Ukraine has generated debate in Finland over this country's own security policy. It's important that President Putin understands Finland's position on NATO membership in this debate. Finland accepts that Russia is working to find a solution to the acute conflict in Ukraine, but it needs to do more."

The foreign minister of Russia, Sergey Lavrov, used a statement of Niinistö in his arguments about future choices for the next Prime Minister of Finland, saying, "'Does Northern Europe need this? How will Russia react?' President Niinistö asked these questions with the subtext. He knows that the answer is negative: nobody needs this"; Lavrov added "President Niinistö realizes that what happened in Ukraine is impossible in Finland."

In his 2015 New Year's Speech, Niinistö stated: "We condemned Russia's illegal annexation of Crimea as soon as it happened and then condemned Russia's actions in eastern Ukraine. We have done this in the EU context but have also made this clear in our direct contacts with Russia. We condemn any illegal occupations, illegal use of force or attempts to limit the sovereignty of independent nations. Such actions never achieve anything but danger and increased tension. While power may have once grown out of the barrel of a gun, these days it leads to nothing but chaos." In October 2015, Niinistö expressed its support for Turkey's accession negotiations with the European Union and urged Turkey to make swift progress on the rule of law, human rights, and reforms.

Niinistö met with Iranian Supreme Leader Ali Khamenei on 26 October 2016 in Tehran, Iran. He also met Iranian President Hassan Rouhani. They discussed closer economic cooperation, human rights in Iran, the situation in the Middle East and the threat of terrorism. Niinistö said: "Iran was one of the first countries to recognise Finland's independence, and now our countries will further deepen their cooperation."

In April 2017, Niinistö openly supported the One-China policy.

In 2018, Niinistö said during his re-election campaign that he would block arms sales to the United Arab Emirates and Saudi Arabia, due to their involvement in the Saudi Arabian–led intervention in Yemen.

On 16 July 2018, Niinistö officially hosted U.S. President Donald Trump and Russian President Putin for the US-Russia Summit in Helsinki. Niinistö was involved 73rd United Nations General Assembly in New York on 25 September 2018. President Niinistö spoke about Russia and Baltic nations affairs at the UNGA 2018.

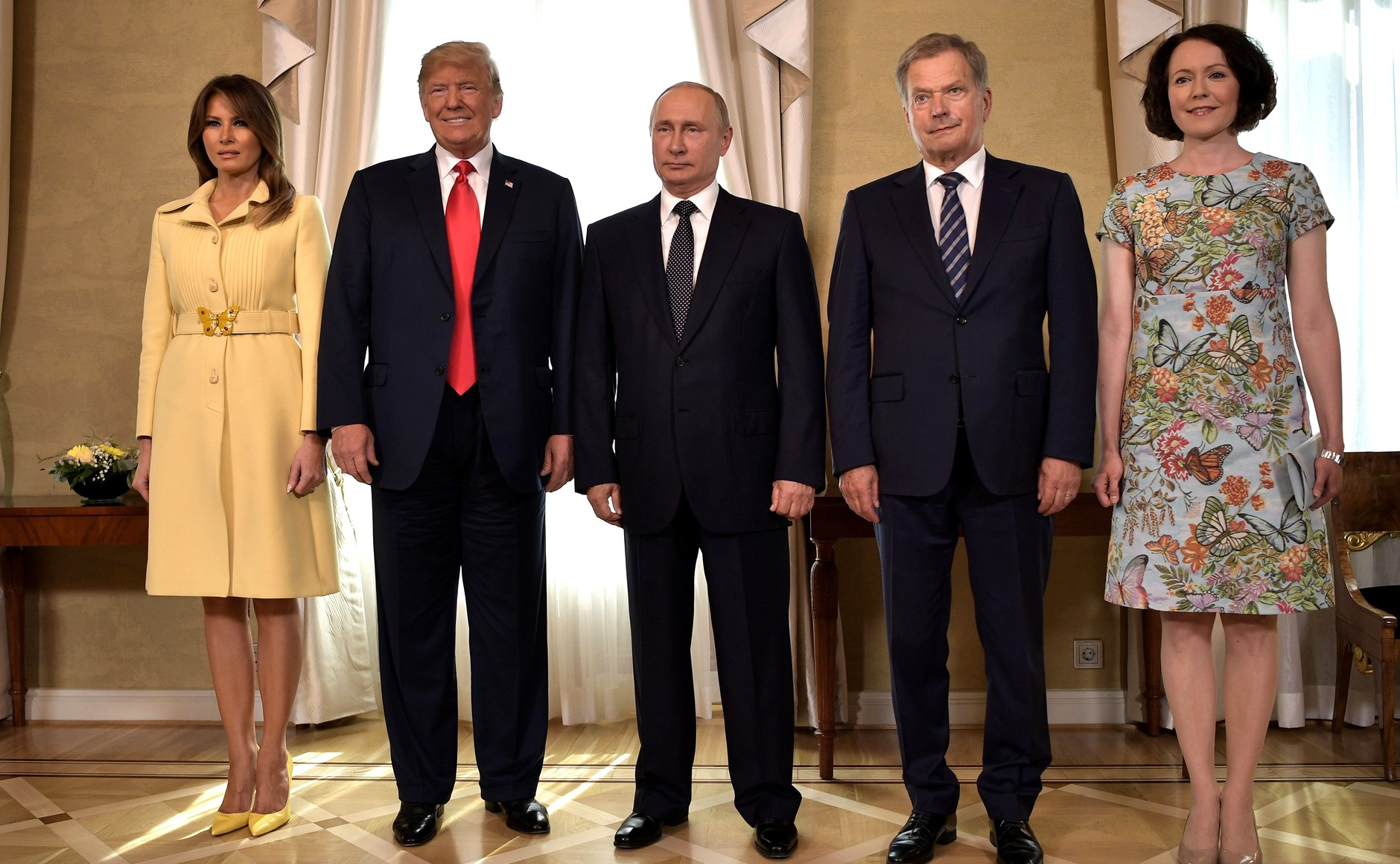
Niinistö with Russian President Vladimir Putin, U.S. President Donald Trump, First Lady of Finland Jenni Haukio and First Lady of the United States Melania Trump in 2018 Russia–United States Summit in July 2018

Niinistö visited China on 13–14 January 2019 and met with General Secretary of the Chinese Communist Party Xi Jinping, they went through common issues between Finland-China to raise friendship and partnership. Xi Jinping and Niinistö jointly launched the 2019 China-Finland Year of Winter Sports.

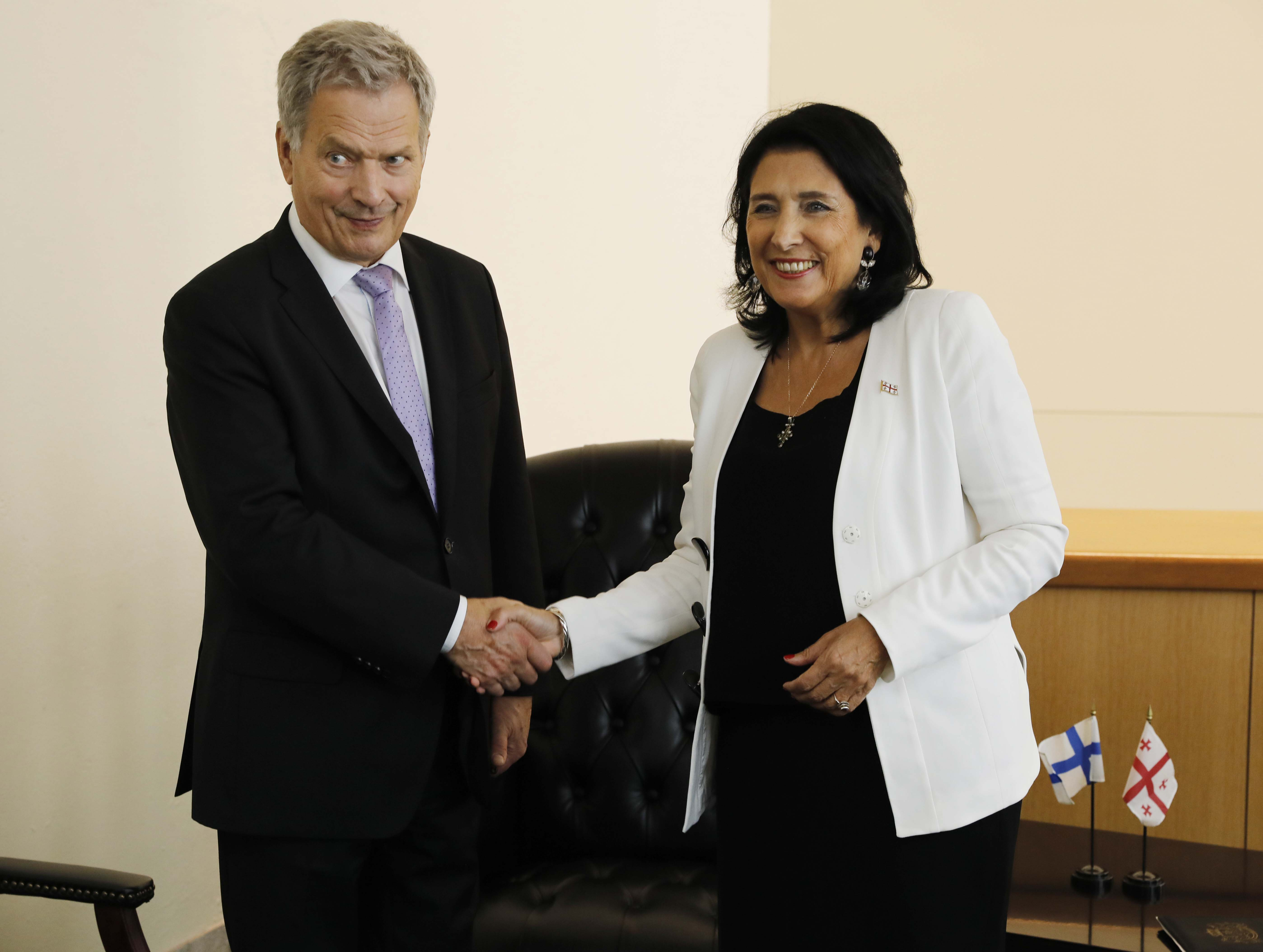
Niinistö meets with Georgian President Salome Zourabichvili in September 2019

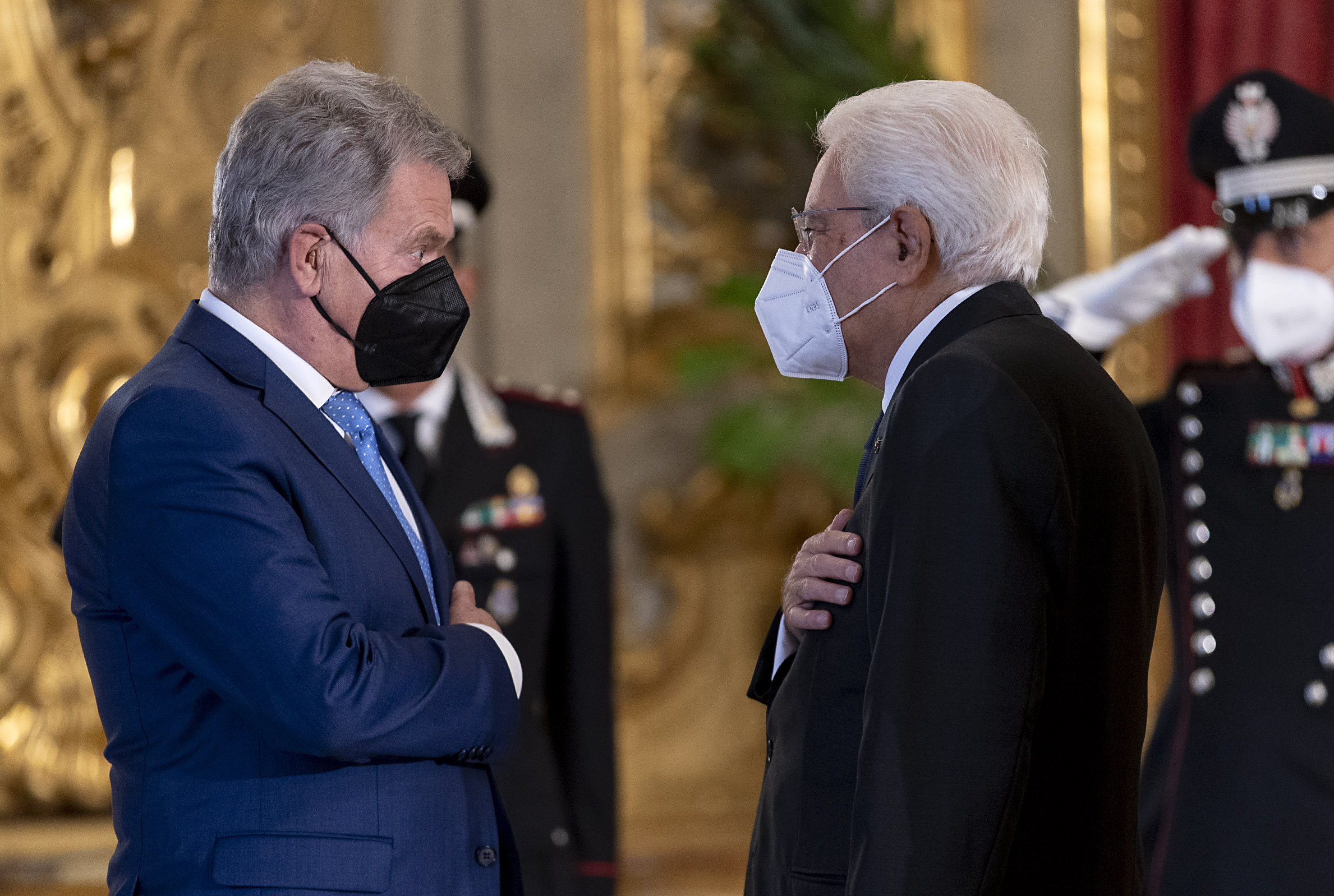
Niinistö meets with Italian President Sergio Mattarella in September 2021

In October 2019, Niinistö condemned Turkey's military campaign in Kurdish–controlled areas of northern Syria. He said that two NATO member states are "quite involved" in Syria.

==== Russian invasion of Ukraine and accession of Finland to NATO ====
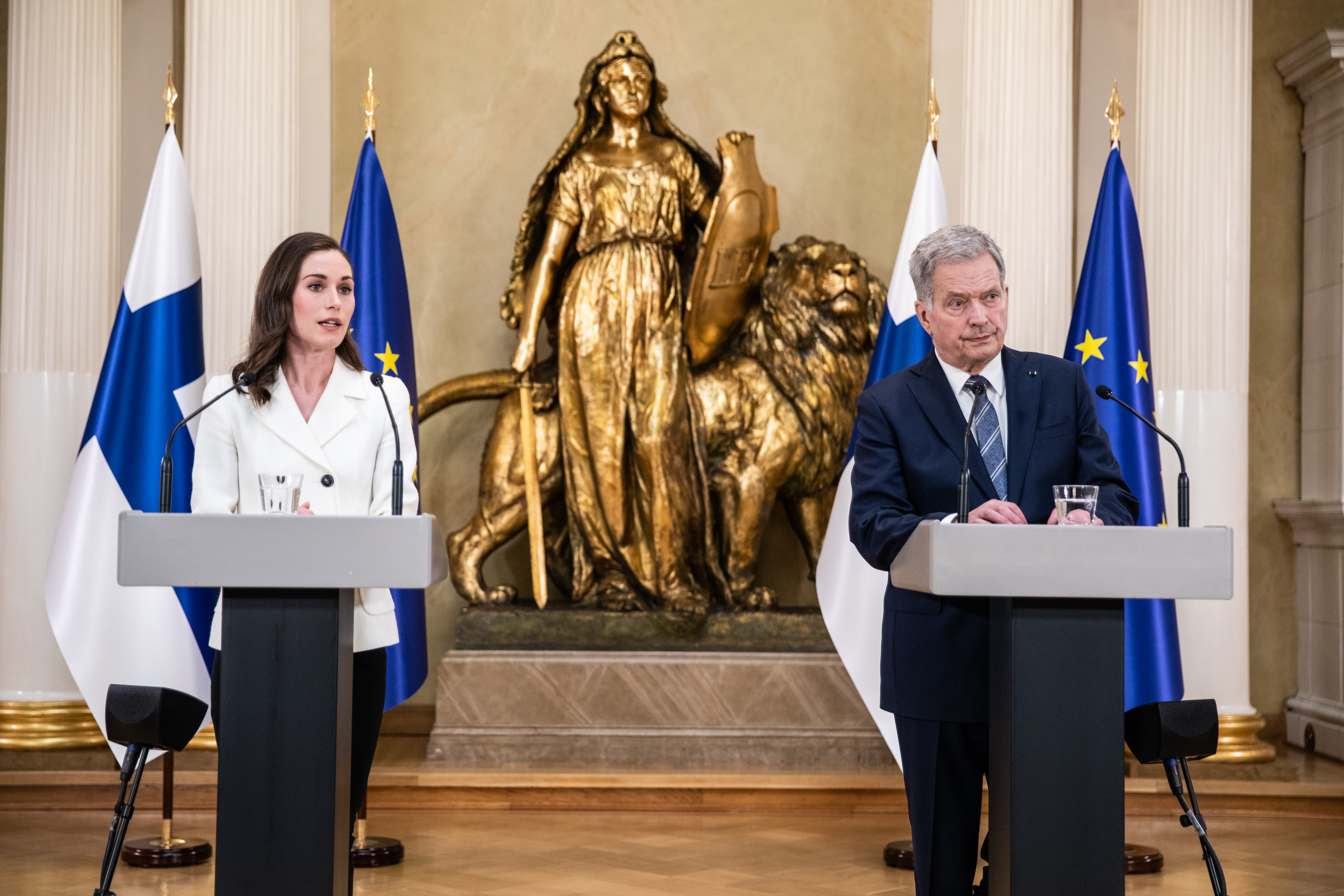
Sauli Niinistö and Prime Minister of Finland, Sanna Marin, at a press conference announcing Finland's intent to apply for NATO membership in May 2022

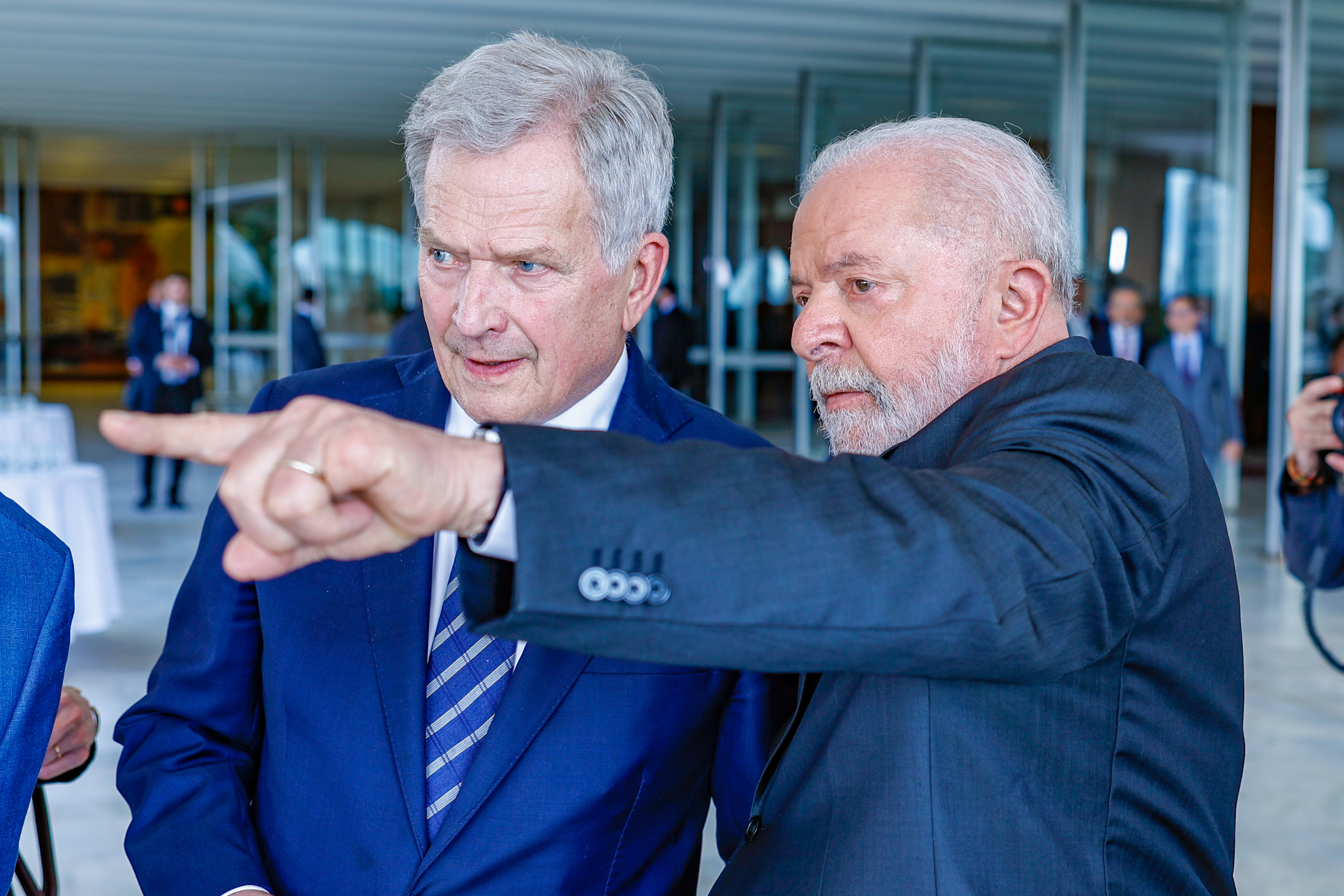
Niinistö met with Brazilian President Luiz Inácio Lula da Silva in June 2023

In an interview with The Washington Post in January 2022, Niinistö stated that he could not speak to Putin's intentions regarding the frozen relations between Russia and the West, but cited what he described as Finnish "wisdom" on experiences in dealing with Moscow. "Finns certainly learned the wisdom that a Cossack, that means a Russian soldier, takes all that is loose. You have to be very, very, clear, where the fixed line is." When he was asked to shed light on his thoughts about Putin after the Russian invasion of Ukraine on 24 February 2022, Niinistö replied: "The masks have now been taken off, showing only the face of war."

On 4 March 2022, Niinistö visited Washington, D.C., to meet President Joe Biden and number of other US politicians and security personnel. The meetings were initiated by Niinistö's office earlier the same week. In a press conference with Finnish media, Niinistö said that in the meeting the presidents discussed the Russian invasion of Ukraine and its impact on European and Finnish security. Furthermore, they agreed on deepening Finnish-US security co-operation and bilateral relations.

On 12 May 2022, ten weeks after the beginning of the Russian invasion of Ukraine, Niinistö and prime minister Sanna Marin advocated in a joint statement for a 'NATO membership without delay'. Niinistö also made his last call with Putin that month, telling him that Finland's decision to join NATO was the Russian leader's "own doing." Finland and Sweden applied for NATO membership on 18 May 2022. On the same day, Turkey formally blocked the start of accession negotiations for Finland and Sweden. On 19 May 2022, Niinistö made a statement regarding Finland's NATO membership, stating that they are ready to address Turkey's security concerns, are ready for dialogue, always take terrorism seriously and always condemn terrorism. On 21 May 2022, Turkish President Recep Tayyip Erdoğan told Niinistö that "overlooking threatening terrorist organisations that pose a threat to a NATO member is not in the spirit of the alliance." On the same day, Niinistö, after a telephone conversation with Erdoğan, announced that they were ready for dialogue with Turkey regarding Finland's membership in NATO and that they always condemned terrorism. On 1 June 2022, Niinistö stated in a statement regarding Finland's NATO membership that Turkey could address its concerns about terrorism, that it was always open to dialogue and that they always condemned terrorism. On 8 June 2022, Niinistö said he was surprised by Turkey's opposition to Finland's NATO membership. During Niinistö's presidency, neighbouring military cooperation ties between Finland and Sweden were further strengthened, culminating in joint, rather than separate, NATO accession bids initiated by both countries. Amid threats of a veto from the Turkish Government over Sweden's accession, Niinistö stated that he was steadfastly committed to the application being joint and that it would mean that Finland would have to decline the invitation into NATO if Sweden's membership application was vetoed. Finland and Sweden signed a trilateral memorandum with Turkey at the NATO summit held in Madrid on 28 June 2022, to address Turkey's security concerns. On the same day, Turkey agreed to support the accession bids of Finland and Sweden. the Turkish government has announced that it will not approve Finland's accession to NATO unless the country extradites individuals allegedly linked to the Kurdistan Workers' Party (PKK) and the Gülen movement. During Niinistö's presidency, Finland became a member of NATO on 4 April 2023.

=== Pardons ===
As President of Finland, Niinistö held the power of pardoning for individual criminal sentences and related sanctions. In 2019 and 2020, he did not pardon anyone, and pardoned on average only three people per year. In comparison, his predecessor Tarja Halonen reached a figure of 20 pardons per year on average. Niinistö had explained that he was in good agreement with the policy of the Supreme Court of Finland, which had always processed the case first before the President saw it. Niinistö supported the abolition of the presidential pardon in his presidential campaigns, calling the institution an outdated "royal tradition".

== Post-presidency (2024–present) ==
In March 2024, Niinistö was called upon to make and prepare a draft report for the EU on improving crisis resistance of European societies at the request of Ursula von der Leyen as President of the European Commission. The report was described to be a society-wide review of Europe's crisis resilience, covering both conventional defense, new and emerging cybersecurity and hybrid threats as well as the impact of people's mindsets on European societies' collective crisis resilience to several threats.

In January 2025, Niinistö criticised European countries for failing to play a central role in engaging Russia to end its war on Ukraine. Niinistö has been considered for a European Union special envoy role tasked with reopening dialogue with Putin regarding the war.

== Political positions ==
Niinistö opposes the president's right to pardon prisoners and only pardoned one prisoner during his first year as president. He opposes same-sex marriage but thinks that same-sex couples should have the right to adoption and a common surname. He supports euthanasia under certain circumstances. In December 2017, Niinistö stated that Finland should not apply for NATO membership in the current circumstances. According to Niinistö, as a member of NATO, Finland would lose the opportunity to stay out of the crisis. However, Niinistö wondered that in the event of a crisis between Russia and the EU, Finland should consider membership very seriously. Following the Russian invasion of Ukraine in 2022, Niinistö, along with Prime Minister Sanna Marin, announced his support for Finnish NATO membership. Finland joined NATO in April 2023.

== Personal life ==
Niinistö married Marja-Leena Alanko in 1974 and they had two sons. Marja-Leena was killed in a car crash in January 1995. In his book Viiden vuoden yksinäisyys (translation: 'Five Years of Loneliness'), Niinistö wrote about his life following the death of his first wife.

While a cabinet minister, Niinistö, as a widower, was romantically involved with MP Tanja Karpela, a former beauty queen and later Minister of Culture. Karpela's Centre Party was in opposition and Niinistö was considered the second-most influential man in government. In 2003 Karpela and Niinistö announced their engagement, which was ended in 2004.

In 2005, Niinistö met Jenni Haukio, who at the time worked for the National Coalition Party and interviewed Niinistö for the Nykypäivä magazine. They later became romantically involved but kept the relationship secret from the public until the wedding on 3 January 2009. In October 2017, the couple announced that they were expecting a child, and they subsequently had a son, who was born in February 2018. In 2017 Niinistö and Haukio's dog Lennu went viral across the world.

Niinistö is the uncle of Ville Niinistö, a Green League MP from Turku, former leader of the Green League and former Minister of the Environment. However, he is not related to ex-Minister of Defence Jussi Niinistö, and their family names have different origins.

Niinistö is a survivor of the 2004 Indian Ocean earthquake and tsunami. He escaped the ensuing tsunami by climbing a utility pole with his son in Khao Lak, Thailand.

Niinistö is a devout Christian and member of the Lutheran Church.

Niinistö enjoys roller skating in his spare time, and in the winter he often plays ice hockey.

Beside his native language, Niinistö also speaks English and Swedish.

== In popular culture ==
- Niinistö was a guest in political satire TV series Hyvät herrat.
- Niinistö had a small role in the film Johtaja Uuno Turhapuro – pisnismies.
- In 2000, Niinistö won 100,000 mk in the Haluatko miljonääriksi? game show. He donated the prize money to a charity against youth drug use.
- Niinistö appears as an animated character in the political satire TV series The Autocrats.

== Honours ==
=== Coat of arms ===
Coat of arms of Sauli Niinistö
Armiger Sauli Väinämö Niinistö Escutcheon Azure, five leafs of linden united by their stalks, argent in a radiant pattern. Motto "Juurista voimaa" ("Strength from the Roots") Orders Collars of the Order of the Elephant and of the Royal Order of the Seraphim Other versions

=== National orders ===
- Finland: Grand Master and Commander Grand Cross with Collar of the Order of the White Rose of Finland
- Finland: Grand Master and Commander Grand Cross of the Order of the Lion of Finland
- Finland: Grand Master and Commander Grand Cross of the Order of the Cross of Liberty

=== Foreign orders ===
- Austria: Grand Star of the Decoration of Honour for Services to the Republic of Austria (5 February 2016)
- Denmark: Knight of the Order of the Elephant (4 April 2013)
- European Union: Honourable member of the European Order of Merit (10 March 2026)
- Estonia: Collar of the Order of the Cross of Terra Mariana (9 May 2014)
- France: Grand Cross of the Order of the Legion of Honour (9 July 2013)
- Germany: Grand Cross Special Class of the Order of Merit of the Federal Republic of Germany (17 September 2018)
- Iceland: Grand Cross with Collar of the Order of the Falcon (28 May 2013)
- Italy: Grand Cross (2008), last with Collar of the Order of Merit of the Italian Republic (2017)
- Latvia: Commander Grand Cross with Chain 1st Class of the Order of the Three Stars (9 October 2013)
- Lithuania: Grand Cross of the Order of Vytautas the Great with Golden Chain (15 May 2013)
- Luxembourg: Grand Cross of the Order of the Gold Lion of the House of Nassau (10 May 2016)
- Mexico: Collar of the Order of the Aztec Eagle (25 May 2015)
- Netherlands: Knight Grand Cross of the Order of Orange-Nassau
- Norway:
  - Grand Cross of the Order of St. Olav (10 October 2012)
  - Grand Cross of the Royal Norwegian Order of Merit (5 June 2007)
- Poland: Knight of the Order of White Eagle (30 March 2015)
- Sweden:
  - Knight (2012) with Collar (2016) of the Royal Order of the Seraphim
  - Recipient of the 70th Birthday Badge Medal of King Carl XVI Gustaf (30 April 2016)
  - Recipient of the Golden Jubilee Medal of King Carl XVI Gustaf (15 September 2023
- Ukraine: Order of Prince Yaroslav the Wise, 1st class (23 August 2021)

=== Honorary doctorates ===
- Finland: Honorary Doctor of Administrative Sciences – University of Tampere (2010)
- Finland: Honorary Doctor of Laws – University of Turku (2011)
- Hungary: Honorary Doctor of Laws – Eötvös Loránd University (2012)
- Finland: Honorary Doctor of Sports Sciences – University of Jyväskylä (2013)
- Finland: Honorary Doctor of Veterinary Medicine – University of Helsinki (2015)
- Finland: Honorary Doctor of Economics – Aalto University School of Business (2016)
- Finland: Honorary Doctor of Laws – University of Helsinki (2017)
- United States of America: Recipient of the Honorary Doctorate of Laws from the University of Minnesota (23 September 2017)
- Finland: Honorary Doctor of Military Sciences – National Defence University (2018)
- United States of America: Was Honored Global Citizen Awards – Atlantic Council (2022)
- Finland: Honorary Doctor of Philosophy, University of Helsinki (2023)

== See also ==
- List of presidents of Finland

== Notes ==
Party political offices
Preceded by Pertti Salolainen	Leader of the National Coalition Party; 1994–2001	Succeeded by Ville Itälä
Political offices
Preceded by Pertti Salolainen	Deputy Prime Minister of Finland; 1995–2001	Succeeded by Ville Itälä
Preceded by Anneli Jäätteenmäki	Minister of Justice; 1995–1996	Succeeded by Kari Häkämies
Preceded by Iiro Viinanen	Minister of Finance; 1996–2003	Succeeded by Antti Kalliomäki
Preceded by Timo Kalli	Speaker of the Parliament; 2007–2011	Succeeded by Ben Zyskowicz
Preceded by Tarja Halonen	President of Finland; 2012–2024	Succeeded by Alexander Stubb
Order of precedence
Preceded by Tarja Halonen as former President	Order of precedence of Finland; Former President	Succeeded by Jussi Halla-aho as Speaker of the Parliament
