= Jussi Järventaus =

Finnish politician (born 1951)

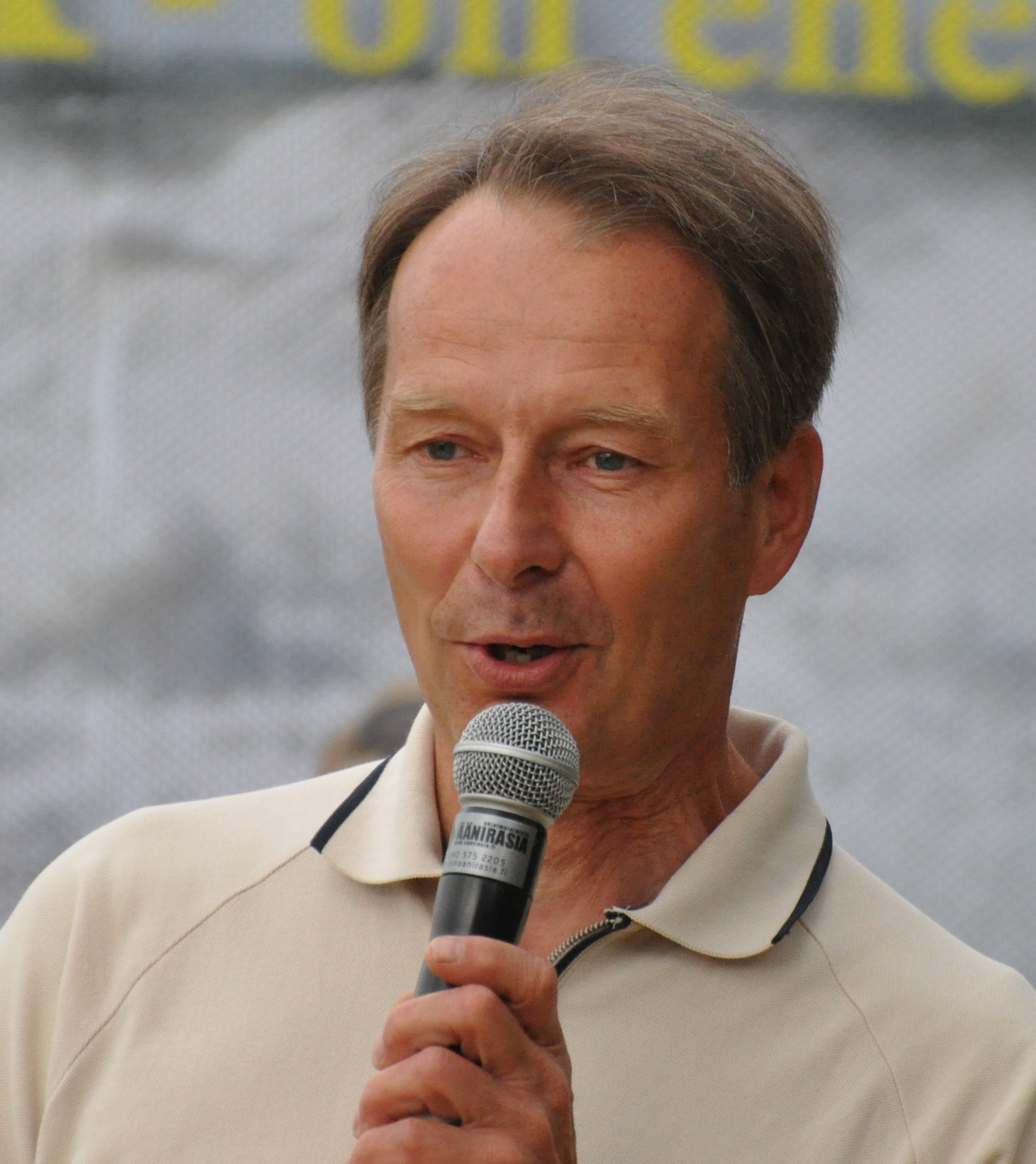
Jussi Järventaus

Jussi Järventaus (born 7 July 1951) is a Finnish politician who served as the minister of justice and was the long term chairman of the Finnish Enterprises Federation.

== Biography ==
Järventaus was born in Helsinki on 7 July 1951. In 1996 he became the chairman of the Finnish Enterprises Federation. He served as the minister of justice between 1998 and 1999. His tenure as the chairman of the Finnish Enterprises Federation ended in 2016.
