= Ville Itälä =

Finnish politician

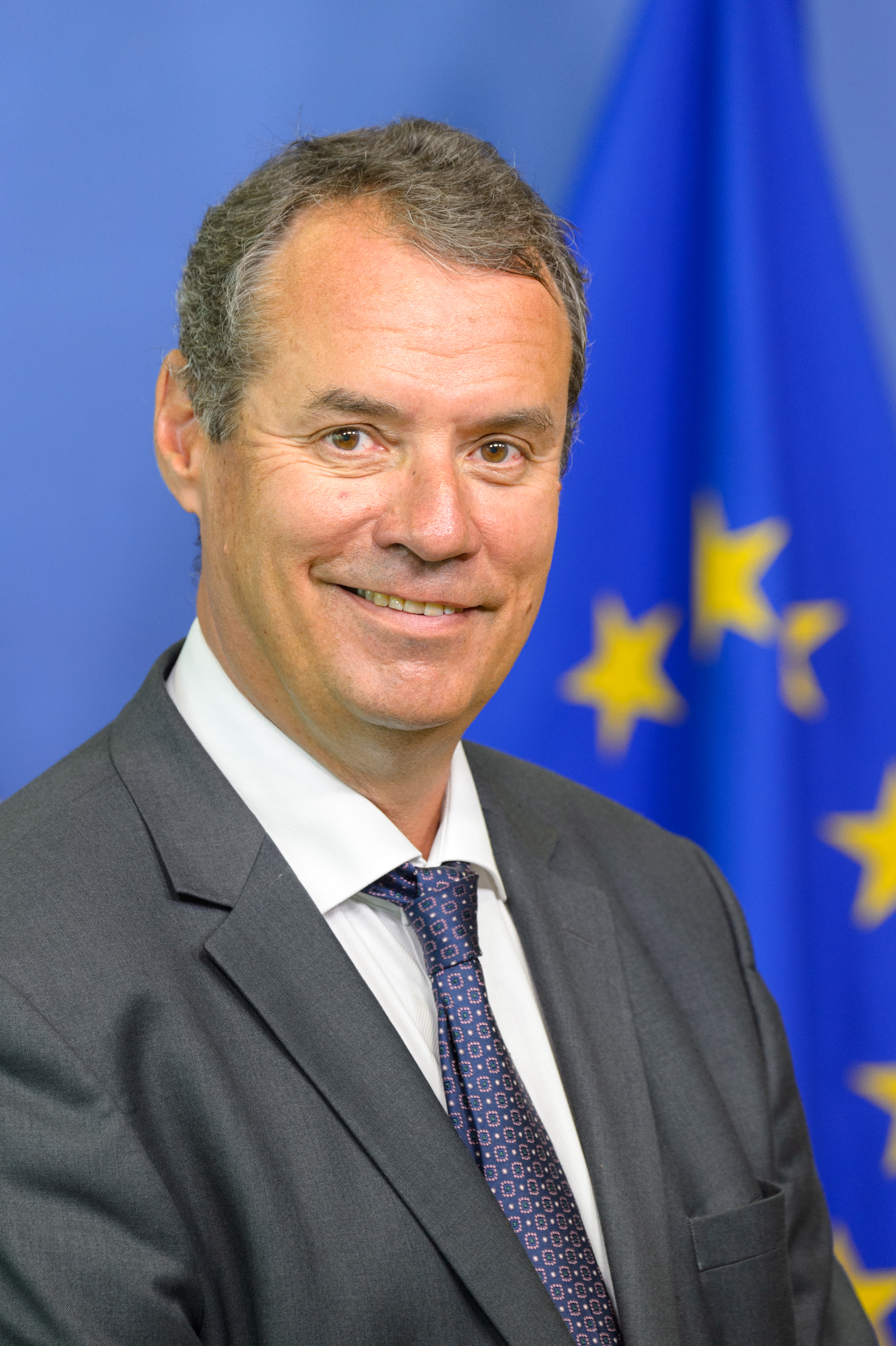
- Ville Itälä in 2018

Director-General of the European Anti-Fraud Office
- Incumbent
- Assumed office 1 August 2018
- Preceded by: Giovanni Kessler

Member of the European Court of Auditors for Finland
- In office 1 March 2012 – 28 February 2018
- President: Vítor Manuel da Silva Caldeira; Klaus-Heiner Lehne
- Preceded by: Olavi Ala-Nissilä
- Succeeded by: Hannu Takkula

Personal details
- Born: 10 May 1959 (age 67) Luumäki, Finland
- Party: National Coalition Party

Ville Heimo Antero Itälä (born 10 May 1959) is a Finnish politician serving as Director-General of the European Anti-Fraud Office (OLAF) since 2018. He was elected member of the Finnish Parliament (Eduskunta) from the district of Southwest Finland in 1995. Itälä served as the Minister of the Interior under Prime Minister Paavo Lipponen from September 2000 to April 2003. He was elected chairman of the National Coalition Party (Kokoomus) in 2001. Following his resignation as party leader in 2004, he was succeeded by Jyrki Katainen. Itälä was a Member of the European Parliament from 2004 until 29 February 2012. He was a member of the European Court of Auditors from 2012 until February 2018.

== European Anti-Fraud Office (OLAF) ==
Ville Itälä served as Director-General of the European Anti-Fraude Office (OLAF) from 2018 until September 2025. He was succeeded by Salla Saastamoinen, who became Acting Director-General on 1 October 2025 following the completion of Itälä’s mandate.

== European Court of Auditors ==
Ville Itälä was a Member of the European Court of Auditors from 2012 to February 2018.

== European Parliament ==
In 2004, Ville Itälä was elected Member of the European Parliament, a position he held for eight years. During this time, he served, among others, on the Committee on Transport and Tourism and was the Deputy-Chair of the Committee on Budgetary Control.

== Finnish Executive and Parliament ==
Ville Itala was elected as Member of the Finnish Parliament (Eduskunta) from the district of Southwest Finland in 1995. Itälä served as the Minister of the Interior under Prime Minister Paavo Lipponen from September 2000 to April 2003. He was elected chairman of the National Coalition Party (Kokoomus) in 2001. Following his resignation as party leader in 2004, he was succeeded by Jyrki Katainen.

== Education ==
Itälä obtained a Master in Law from Turku University, in Finland, and a Master in Law with court training from Vehmaa District Court.
