= Kimmo Sasi =

Finnish politician and lawyer (1952–2025)

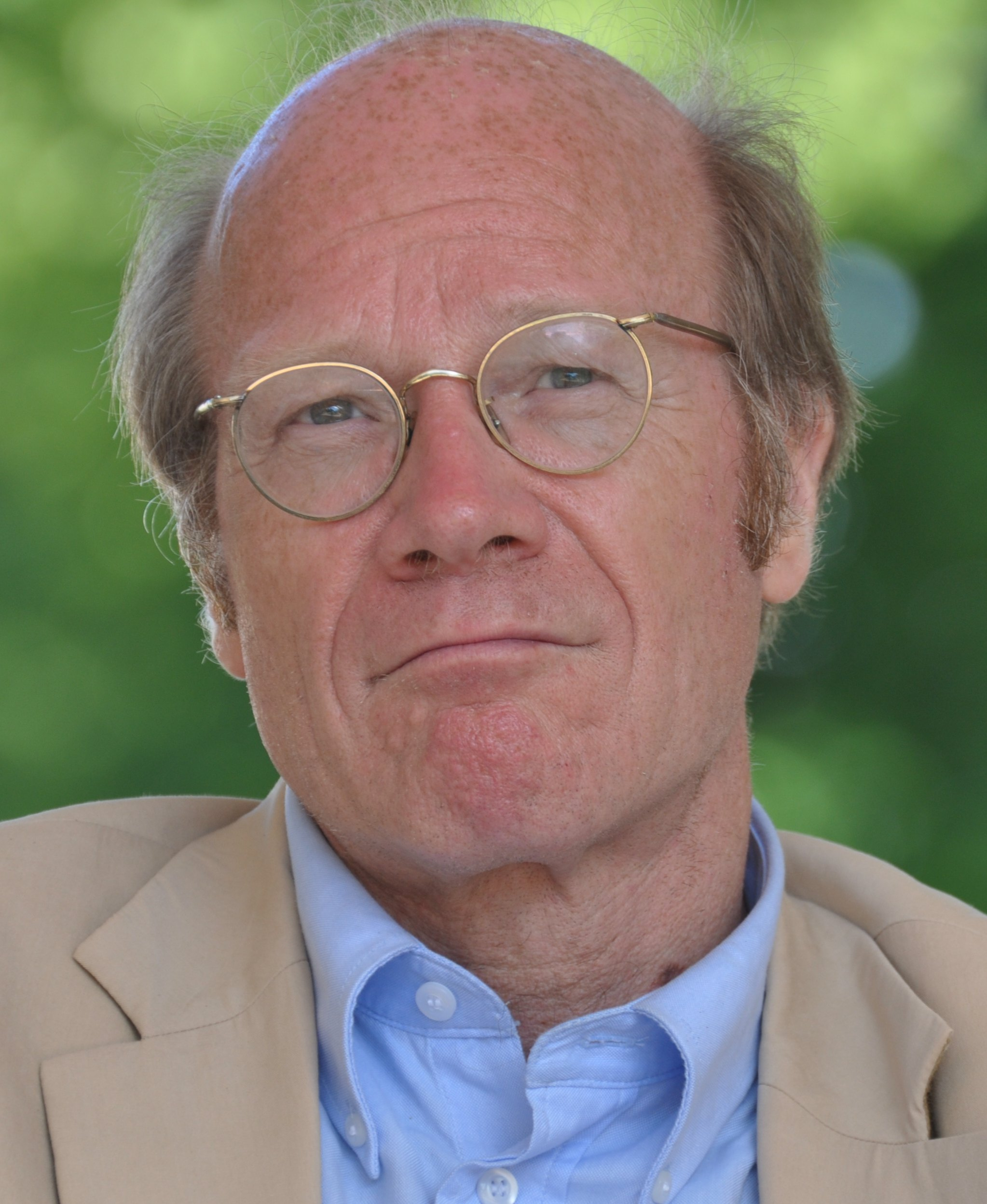
Sasi in 2012

Kimmo Kalevi Immeri Sasi (21 February 1952 – 16 April 2025) was a Finnish politician and lawyer. A member of the centre-right National Coalition Party, he served as a member of the Parliament of Finland from 1983 until 2015. He served as Minister of Foreign Trade from 1999 to 2002 and as Minister of Transport and Communications in the government of Finland from 2002 to 2003. He was chairman of the parliamentary committee on constitutional affairs from 2003 to 2011, and served as chairman of the standing committee on finance beginning in 2011. He served as President of the Nordic Council in 2012. Sasi died on 16 April 2025, at the age of 73.
