= Paavo Lipponen =

Prime minister of Finland from 1995 to 2003

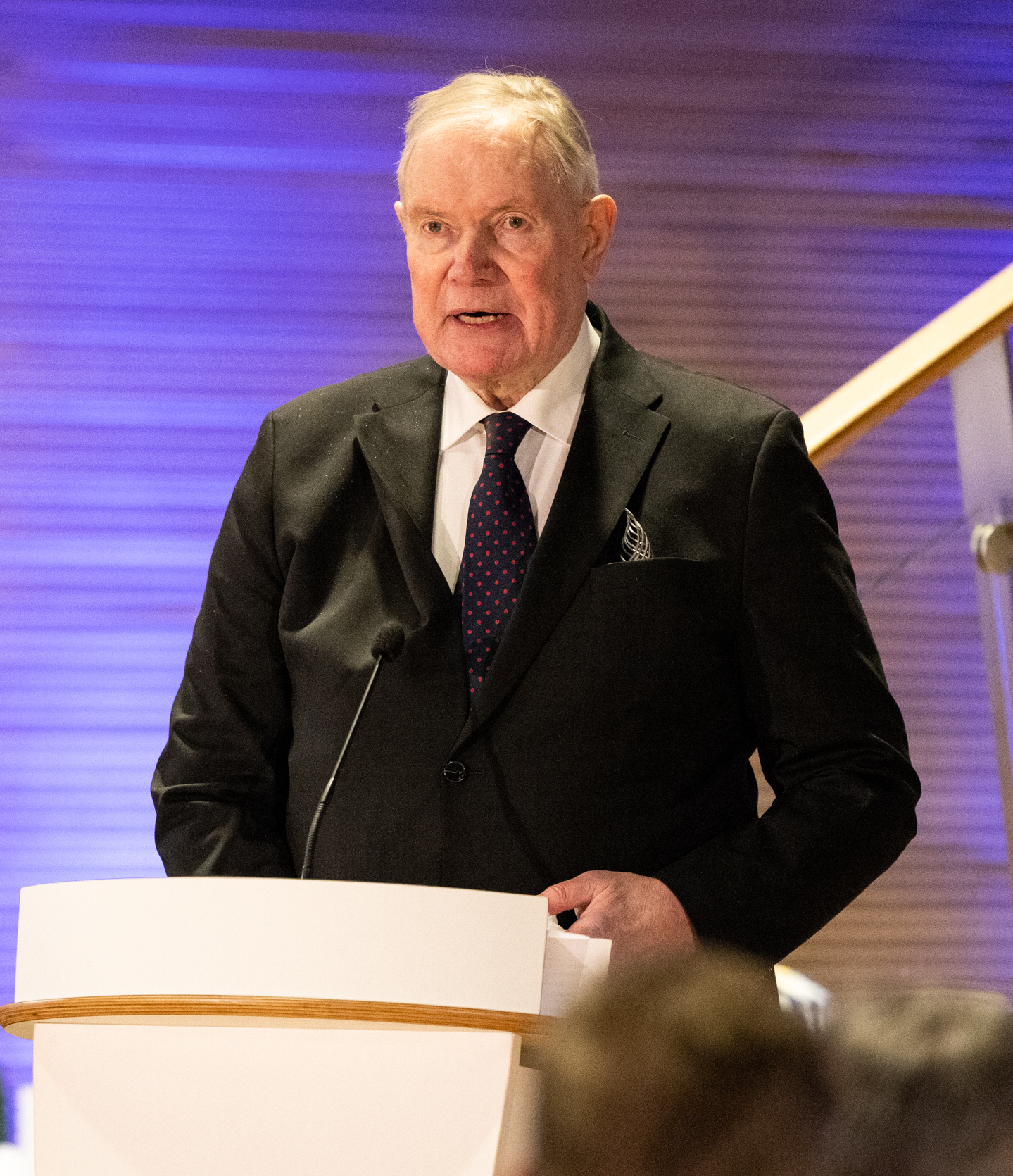
- Lipponen in 2023

38th Prime Minister of Finland
- In office 13 April 1995 – 17 April 2003
- President: Martti Ahtisaari; Tarja Halonen
- Deputy: Sauli Niinistö; Ville Itälä
- Preceded by: Esko Aho
- Succeeded by: Anneli Jäätteenmäki

Speaker of the Finnish Parliament
- In office 22 April 2003 – 20 March 2007
- Preceded by: Liisa Jaakonsaari (Acting)
- Succeeded by: Timo Kalli
- In office 28 March 1995 – 19 April 1995
- Preceded by: Riitta Uosukainen
- Succeeded by: Riitta Uosukainen

Personal details
- Born: Paavo Tapio Lipponen; 23 April 1941 (age 85) Turtola, Finland
- Party: Social Democratic
- Spouse: Päivi Lipponen (née Hiltunen)
- Children: 3
- Education: Dartmouth College; University of Helsinki

Military service
- Allegiance: Finland
- Branch/service: Finnish Army
- Rank: Staff sergeant

Paavo Tapio Lipponen (Note: Finnish pronunciation: [ˈpɑːʋo ˈlipːonen]) (born 23 April 1941) is a Finnish politician and former reporter. He was prime minister of Finland from 1995 to 2003, and chairman of the Social Democratic Party of Finland from 1993 to 2005. He also served as speaker of the Parliament of Finland from 2003 to 2007 and was his party's nominee in the 2012 Finnish presidential election but received only 6.7% of the votes, making it the biggest defeat the Social Democratic Party had ever received in Finnish presidential elections at the time. Lipponen is currently the oldest living former prime minister of Finland.

== Career ==
Lipponen was born in Turtola (subsequently renamed Pello), the son of Orvo Lipponen and his wife Hilkka Iisalo. Paavo's maternal grandparents were Jaakko Antero Ingman/Iisalo (a distant relative of Adolf Fredrik Munck and Carl Gustaf Emil Mannerheim) and his wife Siiri Törnroos. Paavo Lipponen spent his childhood and youth in Kuopio.

Receiving his gymnasium diploma from the Lyceum of Kuopio in 1959, he then studied philosophy and literature at Dartmouth College for one year on a Fulbright scholarship.

Soon after returning to Finland, he moved to Helsinki where he eventually attained a master's degree in international relations from the University of Helsinki in 1971. He was the editor of the student newspaper Ylioppilaslehti 1963–1965 and a freelance reporter for the Finnish Broadcasting Company (YLE) 1965–1967.

Lipponen made various controversial statements that angered groups such as Estonian refugees.

According to Alpo Rusi's book Vasemmalta ohi, Lipponen began cooperation with the East German secret police Stasi in 1969. The book suggests that Lipponen is the code name Mungo XV/326/71 in the Rosenholz files. In a 2008 interview Lipponen said that he had been a "target of East German manipulation". It is rumored that Lipponen is on the so-called Tiitinen list. Alpo Rusi has also suggested that Lipponen had an alias, code, and operation in the KGB.

He held various posts in the Social Democratic Party organisation from 1967 to 1979. Lipponen's opinions were changed. In a speech in 1978, Lipponen asserted that he had lost his belief in socialism.

Lipponen first came into the political limelight when he was secretary to prime minister Mauno Koivisto from 1979 to 1982. Frequently having to substitute for the busy prime minister, Lipponen was soon dubbed vara-Manu ("deputy Manu" — Manu being short for Mauno).

Lipponen was a member of the Parliament of Finland from 1983 to 1987 and also from 1991 until he retired in 2007.

In 1993, SDP chairman Ulf Sundqvist was suspected and later convicted of a large financial fraud. Lipponen was elected the new chairman in 1993, and he led the party to victory in the parliamentary election of 1995. Lipponen formed a cabinet of five parties, including both rightist and leftist parties. Lipponen's economic policies were, however, dominated by the right-wing. The main task of the cabinet was to decrease the number of unemployed people. Tight fiscal policies allowed the participation of Finland in the European Monetary Union, which resulted in the introduction of the euro in 1999. Foreign trade increased above the European average 1995–1999. Laws for a new constitution were passed and it took effect on 1 March 2000.

Lipponen headed the SDP campaign in 1999, which resulted in losses, but the SDP remained the largest party in the parliament. The coalition formed in 1995 was renewed. During the second Lipponen cabinet, he headed Finland's six months in the EU presidency and pursued pro-integration and pro-expansion policies. Lipponen introduced the concept of a European constitution during a speech in Bruges in 2000.

He headed the SDP campaign of 2003, which led to victory for the SDP; however, the Center Party gained more seats, which marked the end for the succession of the cabinets of the SDP and the National Coalition Party. The chairman of the Center Party, Anneli Jäätteenmäki, formed a new cabinet, and Lipponen took the position of speaker of Parliament. Lipponen retired from the party chairmanship in 2005 and was succeeded by Eero Heinäluoma. Lipponen left the parliament in 2007.

Anneli Jäätteenmäki of the Centre Party won the elections after she had accused Paavo Lipponen, who was prime minister at the time, of allying neutral Finland with the United States in the war in Iraq during a meeting with President George W. Bush, and thus associated Finland with what many Finns considered an illegal war of aggression. Lipponen denied the claims and declared that "We support the UN and the UN Secretary-General." Jäätteenmäki resigned as prime minister after 63 days in office amid accusations that she had lied about the leak of the documents about the meeting between Bush and Lipponen. This series of events was considered scandalous and it is named Iraq leak or Iraq-gate.

On 15 August 2008, during the 2008 South Ossetia war, Nord Stream 1, a Russian gas project, announced that it had signed a consulting contract with Lipponen. According to Nord Stream, he advises on the environmental impact assessment (EIA) and permit applications in Finland. He provides independent consultations according to his expertise in Finnish administrative and decision-making procedures within the energy sector.

As a result of the scandal that followed, Lipponen relinquished his office in the parliament building and resigned from all of his duties in Finland except veteran activities.

In an article published in October 2008, Lipponen discussed the Russian response in Georgia and warned Europe of its dependence on Russian gas. Lipponen criticised the way many Finnish and German politicians were opposed to nuclear power and stated that their fundamentalism destroys both energy security and climate policy.

Poland reportedly blocked Lipponen's candidacy as EU foreign policy chief because of Lipponen's ties to Nord Stream.

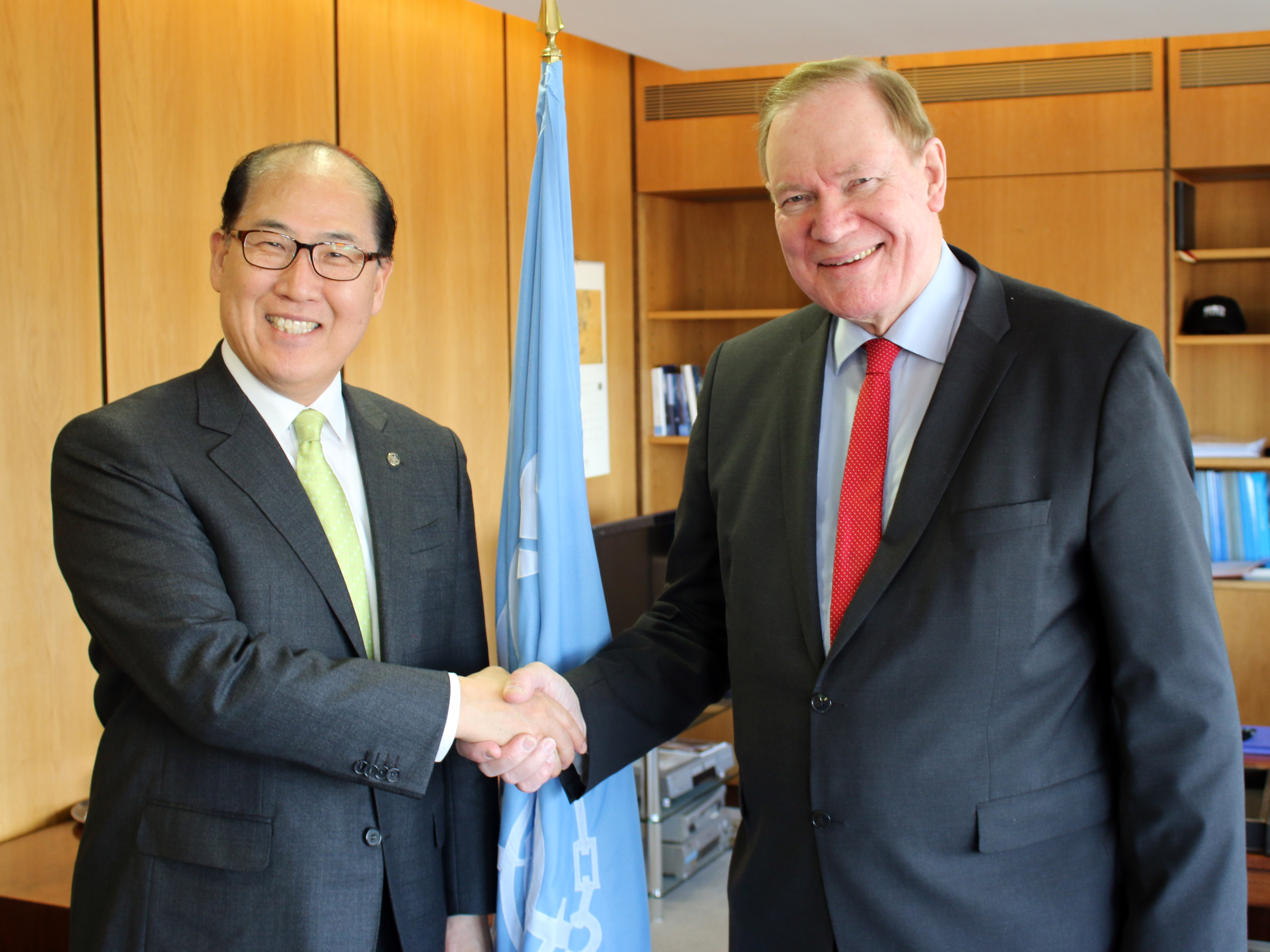
Paavo Lipponen, meets IMO Secretary-General Kitack Lim at IMO HQ (24 February 2016).

Lipponen was his party's nominee in the 2012 Finnish presidential election. He was knocked out in the first round, receiving 6.7% of the vote.

Lipponen has declined the honour of being named a counselor of state, the highest honour in Finland, saying that no-one outside of Finland knows what a valtioneuvos is and that he is satisfied with being "former prime minister".

== Personal life ==
Lipponen played water polo at the highest national level in his youth.

He currently lives with his second wife, Päivi Lipponen (formerly Hertzberg, née Hiltunen), and has three children.

== Popular culture ==
Lipponen appears as an animated character in the political satire TV series The Autocrats.

== Cabinets ==
- Lipponen I Cabinet (1995–1999)
- Lipponen II Cabinet (1999–2003)

Political offices
Preceded by Riitta Uosukainen	Speaker of Parliament; 1995	Succeeded by Riitta Uosukainen
Preceded by Esko Aho	Prime Minister of Finland; 1995–2003	Succeeded by Anneli Jäätteenmäki
Preceded by Liisa Jaakonsaari; Acting	Speaker of Parliament; 2003–2007	Succeeded by Timo Kalli
Diplomatic posts
Preceded by Gerhard Schröder	President of the European Council; 1999	Succeeded by António Guterres
