= Vanhanen I cabinet =

69th cabinet of Finland

Vanhanen's First Cabinet
- 69th Cabinet of Finland

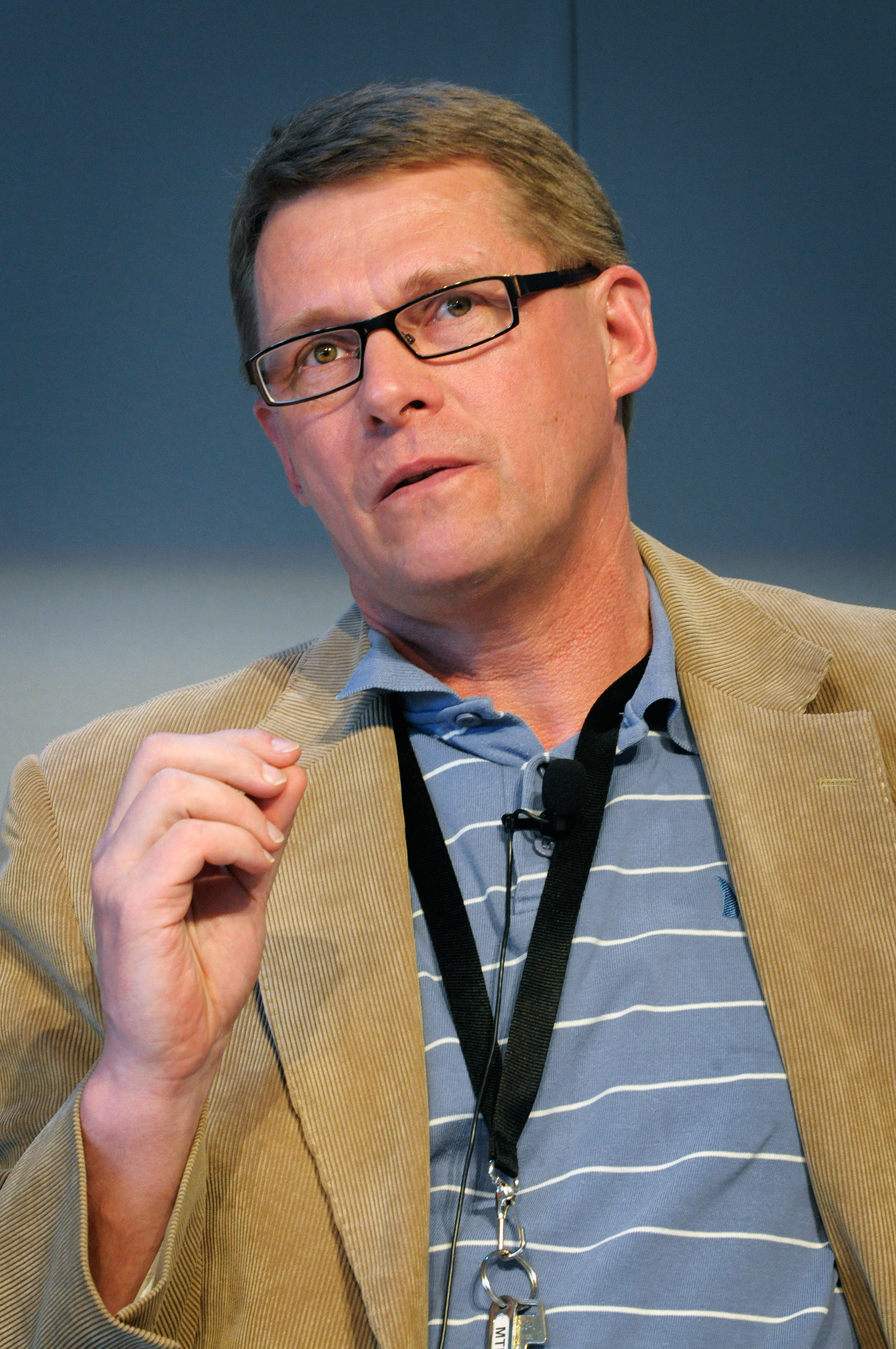
- Date formed: 24 June 2003
- Date dissolved: 19 April 2007

People and organisations
- Head of state: Tarja Halonen
- Head of government: Matti Vanhanen
- Member parties: Centre Party; Social Democratic Party; Swedish People's Party
- Status in legislature: Majority (coalition)

History
- Election: 2003 Finnish parliamentary election
- Predecessor: Jäätteenmäki Cabinet
- Successor: Vanhanen II Cabinet

Matti Vanhanen's first cabinet was the 69th government of Finland. The cabinet was in office from 24 July 2003 to 19 April 2007, and its prime minister was Matti Vanhanen. The government was composed of a coalition formed by the Centre Party, the Social Democratic Party, and the Swedish People's Party.

== Ministers ==
Cabinet members
Portfolio	Minister	Took office	Left office	Party
Prime Minister	Matti Vanhanen	24 June 2003	19 April 2007	Centre
Deputy Prime Minister	Antti Kalliomäki	24 June 2003	23 September 2005	SDP
Deputy Prime Minister	Eero Heinäluoma	23 September 2005	19 April 2007	SDP
Minister of Foreign Affairs	Erkki Tuomioja	24 June 2003	19 April 2007	SDP
Minister of the Interior	Kari Rajamäki	24 June 2003	19 April 2007	SDP
Minister of Defence	Seppo Kääriäinen	24 June 2003	19 April 2007	Centre
Minister of Finance	Antti Kalliomäki	24 June 2003	22 September 2005	SDP
Minister of Finance	Eero Heinäluoma	23 September 2005	19 April 2007	SDP
Coordinate Minister of Finance	Ulla-Maj Wideroos	24 June 2003	19 April 2007	RKP
Minister of Education	Tuula Haatainen	24 June 2003	22 September 2005	SDP
Minister of Education	Eero Heinäluoma	23 September 2005	19 April 2007	SDP
Minister of Justice	Johannes Koskinen	24 June 2003	22 September 2005	SDP
Minister of Justice	Leena Luhtanen	23 September 2005	19 April 2007	SDP
Minister of Agriculture and Forestry	Juha Korkeaoja	24 June 2003	19 April 2007	Centre
Minister of Transport and Communications	Leena Luhtanen	24 June 2003	22 September 2005	SDP
Minister of Transport and Communications	Susanna Huovinen	23 September 2005	19 April 2007	SDP
Minister of Trade and Industry	Mauri Pekkarinen	24 June 2003	19 April 2007	Centre
Minister of Social Affairs and Health	Sinikka Mönkäre	24 June 2003	22 September 2005	SDP
Minister of Social Affairs and Health	Tuula Haatainen	23 September 2005	19 April 2007	SDP
Minister of Health and Social Services	Liisa Hyssälä	24 June 2003	19 April 2007	Centre
Minister of Labour	Tarja Filatov	24 June 2003	19 April 2007	SDP
Minister of the Environment	Jan-Erik Enestam	24 June 2003	31 December 2006	RKP
Minister of the Environment	Stefan Wallin	1 January 2007	19 April 2007	RKP
Minister of Culture	Tanja Saarela	24 June 2003	19 April 2007	Centre
Minister of Regional and Municipal Affairs	Hannes Manninen	24 June 2003	19 April 2007	Centre
Minister of Foreign Trade and Development	Paula Lehtomäki	24 June 2003	2 September 2005	Centre
Minister of Foreign Trade and Development	Mari Kiviniemi	2 September 2005	3 March 2006	Centre
Minister of Foreign Trade and Development	Paula Lehtomäki	3 March 2006	19 April 2007	Centre

Preceded by Jäätteenmäki's Cabinet	Cabinet of Finland; 26 June 2003 – 19 April 2007	Succeeded by Vanhanen's Second Cabinet
