= Minister of the Environment and Climate Change =

Finnish cabinet minister

The Minister of the Environment and Climate Change (Finnish: ympäristö- ja ilmastoministeri, Swedish: miljö- och klimatminister, formerly Minister of the Environment) is one of the ministerial portfolios which comprise the Finnish Government. The minister heads the Ministry of the Environment and is responsible for the preparation of legal matters concerning communities, the built environment, housing, biodiversity, the sustainable use of natural resources, and environmental protection in Finland. The incumbent Minister of the Environment and Climate Change is Sari Multala of the National Coalition Party.

== List of ministers of the environment ==
No.	Portrait	Minister	Took office	Left office	Time in office	Party	Cabinet
1	Matti Ahde	Matti Ahde (1945–2019)	1 October 1983	30 April 1987	3 years, 211 days	SDP	Sorsa IV
2	Kaj Bärlund	Kaj Bärlund (born 1945)	30 April 1987	26 April 1991	3 years, 361 days	SDP	Holkeri
3	Sirpa Pietikäinen	Sirpa Pietikäinen (born 1959)	26 April 1991	13 April 1995	3 years, 352 days	National Coalition	Aho
4	Pekka Haavisto	Pekka Haavisto (born 1958)	13 April 1995	15 April 1999	4 years, 2 days	Green	Lipponen I
5	Satu Hassi	Satu Hassi (born 1951)	15 April 1999	31 May 2002	3 years, 46 days	Green	Lipponen II
6	Jouni Backman	Jouni Backman (born 1959)	31 May 2002	17 April 2003	321 days	SDP	Lipponen II
7	Jan-Erik Enestam	Jan-Erik Enestam (born 1947)	17 April 2003	31 December 2006	3 years, 258 days	RKP	Jäätteenmäki; Vanhanen I
8	Stefan Wallin	Stefan Wallin (born 1967)	1 January 2007	19 April 2007	108 days	RKP	Vanhanen I
9	Paula Lehtomäki	Paula Lehtomäki (born 1972)	19 April 2007	28 June 2007	70 days	Centre	Vanhanen II
10	Kimmo Tiilikainen	Kimmo Tiilikainen (born 1966)	28 June 2007	10 April 2008	287 days	Centre	Vanhanen II
(9)	Paula Lehtomäki	Paula Lehtomäki (born 1972)	11 April 2008	22 June 2011	3 years, 72 days	Centre	Vanhanen II; Kiviniemi
11	Ville Niinistö	Ville Niinistö (born 1976)	22 June 2011	26 September 2014	3 years, 96 days	Green	Katainen; Stubb
12	Sanni Grahn-Laasonen	Sanni Grahn-Laasonen (born 1983)	26 September 2014	29 May 2015	245 days	National Coalition	Stubb
(10)	Kimmo Tiilikainen	Kimmo Tiilikainen (born 1966)	29 May 2015	6 June 2019	4 years, 8 days	Centre	Sipilä
13	Krista Mikkonen	Krista Mikkonen (born 1972)	6 June 2019	19 November 2021	2 years, 166 days	Green	Rinne; Marin
14	Emma Kari	Emma Kari (born 1983)	19 November 2021	7 June 2022	200 days	Green	Marin
15	Maria Ohisalo	Maria Ohisalo (born 1985)	7 June 2022	20 June 2023	3 years, 256 days	Green	Marin
16	Kai Mykkänen	Kai Mykkänen (born 1979)	20 June 2023	24 January 2025	2 years, 243 days	National Coalition	Orpo
17	Sari Multala	Sari Multala (born 1978)	24 January 2025	Incumbent	1 year, 25 days	National Coalition	Orpo
