= Jäätteenmäki cabinet =

68th cabinet of Finland

Jäätteenmäki's Cabinet
- 68th Cabinet of Finland
- Date formed: 17 April 2003
- Date dissolved: 24 June 2003

People and organisations
- Head of state: Tarja Halonen
- Head of government: Anneli Jäätteenmäki
- Member parties: Centre Party; Social Democratic Party; Swedish People's Party
- Status in legislature: Majority (coalition)

History
- Election: 2003 Finnish parliamentary election
- Predecessor: Lipponen II Cabinet
- Successor: Vanhanen I Cabinet

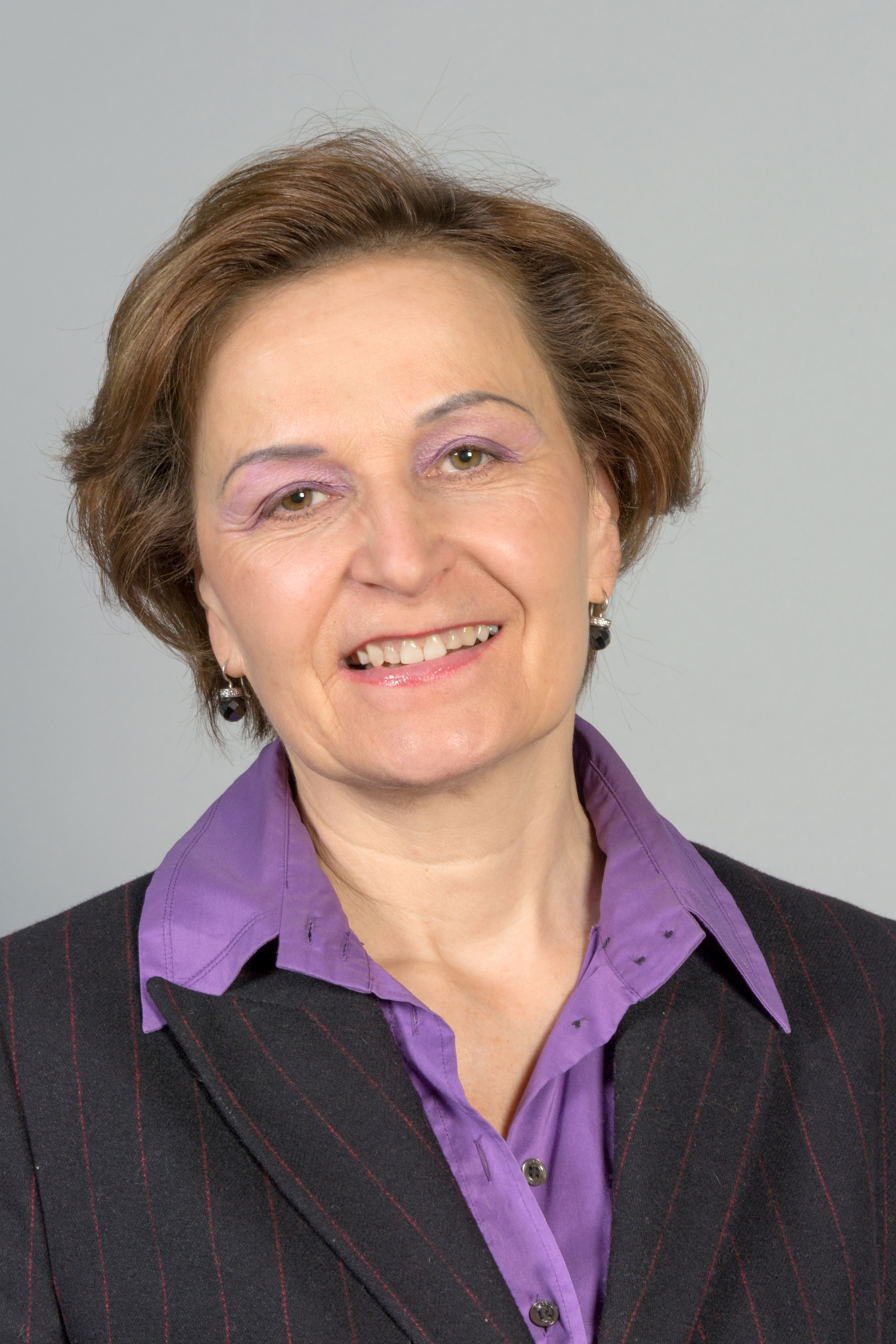
Anneli Jäätteenmäki in 2014.

The cabinet of Anneli Jäätteenmäki was the 68th government of Finland. The cabinet was in office from 17 April 2003 to 24 June 2003. It was a majority coalition government headed by Prime Minister Anneli Jäätteenmäki. The cabinet was formed by three parties: the Centre Party, the Social Democratic Party, and the Swedish People's Party.

Lasting only 69 days, the Jäätteenmäki cabinet is the fourth-shortest-lived cabinet in Finnish history. The cabinet was dissolved by the Prime Minister due to her involvement in the Iraq leak scandal. The succeeding government, the Vanhanen I Cabinet, was based on the same coalition.

== Ministers ==
Portfolio	Minister	Took office	Left office	Party
Prime Minister	Anneli Jäätteenmäki	17 April 2003	24 June 2003	Centre
Minister deputising for the Prime Minister	Antti Kalliomäki	17 April 2003	24 June 2003	SDP
Minister at the Prime Minister's Office	Paula Lehtomäki	17 April 2003	24 June 2003	Centre
Minister for Foreign Affairs	Erkki Tuomioja	17 April 2003	24 June 2003	SDP
Minister for Foreign Trade and Development	Paula Lehtomäki	17 April 2003	24 June 2003	Centre
Minister at the Ministry for Foreign Affairs	Jan-Erik Enestam	17 April 2003	24 June 2003	RKP
Minister of Justice	Johannes Koskinen	17 April 2003	24 June 2003	SDP
Minister of the Interior	Kari Rajamäki	17 April 2003	24 June 2003	SDP
Minister of Regional and Municipal Affairs	Hannes Manninen	17 April 2003	24 June 2003	Centre
Minister of Defence	Matti Vanhanen	17 April 2003	24 June 2003	Centre
Minister of Finance	Antti Kalliomäki	17 April 2003	24 June 2003	SDP
Coordinate Minister of Finance	Ulla-Maj Wideroos	17 April 2003	24 June 2003	RKP
Minister of Education	Tuula Haatainen	17 April 2003	24 June 2003	SDP
Minister of Agriculture and Forestry	Juha Korkeaoja	17 April 2003	24 June 2003	Centre
Minister of Transport and Communications	Leena Luhtanen	17 April 2003	24 June 2003	SDP
Minister of Trade and Industry	Mauri Pekkarinen	17 April 2003	24 June 2003	Centre
Minister at the Ministry of Trade and Industry	Paula Lehtomäki	17 April 2003	24 June 2003	Centre
Minister of Social Affairs and Health	Sinikka Mönkäre	17 April 2003	24 June 2003	SDP
Minister of Health and Social Services	Liisa Hyssälä	17 April 2003	24 June 2003	Centre
Minister of Labour	Tarja Filatov	17 April 2003	24 June 2003	SDP
Minister of the Environment	Jan-Erik Enestam	17 April 2003	24 June 2003	RKP
Minister at the Ministry of the Environment	Hannes Manninen	17 April 2003	24 June 2003	Centre

Preceded by Paavo Lipponen's second Cabinet	Cabinet of Finland; April 17, 2003 - June 24, 2003	Succeeded by Matti Vanhanen's first cabinet
