= 2007 Finnish campaign finance scandal =

The 2007 Finnish campaign finance scandal arose in the spring of 2008 due to campaign funding issues related to the 2007 elections for the Finnish Parliament held on 18 March 2007. The scandal involved mainly the campaign funding of the National Coalition Party and Centre Party candidates. Several related cases were ongoing as of February 2012.

== International ==
According to Transparency International, the lack of transparency in Finnish political financing is remarkable even on an international stage. The organization compared the Finnish system to that of Belarus. According to GRECO, in 2007, the possibility of corruption should be more comprehensively taken into account in the Finnish election funding system.

== The 2007 elections ==
Information regarding funding was not made public during the election. The persons who were elected had to make their finance reports public no later than May, 2007.

Corporate funding of the elections stunned journalists in 2007, but after May 7, 2008, it was revealed that corporate funding of the elections was much larger than publicly reported figures claimed. This became a political scandal in 2008–2010. Many additions were made to the public finance reports in May 2008, which was a year too late. This pertained to multiple Ministers in Government: Jyri Häkämies (kok), Ilkka Kanerva (kok), Jyrki Katainen (kok), Jan Vapaavuori (kok), Paula Lehtomäki (centre), Mauri Pekkarinen (centre), Anu Vehviläinen (centre), Liisa Hyssälä (centre) and Stefan Wallin (rkp). The lack of amendments to financial reports was not in itself evidence that the reports were in any way complete; there was no scrutiny and no penalties were ever issued.

== Law ==
According to Markku Hirvonen (Ministry of State Finance), the main problem in election funding is the lack of scrutiny.

The Finnish parliament considered the law unnecessary in 2002. However, Finland was forced to change the criminal law by the European Council in 2002, later than in many other countries. The parliament made the law of election funds beneficial for itself. The new criminal law (2002) denied giving or taking bribery for/by the representatives of the parliament. The law was formulated in a way that it was in practice not possible to find any evidence of violations against the law, according to professor Timo Viljanen, University of Turku, criminal law.

Since the parliamentarians did not perform according to the law, some individuals asked the Ministry of Justice to investigate the case. According to the Ministry of Justice, all control is the responsibility of the media and they have no opportunity to punish any politician of any potential bribery cases and/or lack of information. In 2011 the funds had not been opened by all politicians. e.g. Mari Kiviniemi has said that most payments of a total €65,991 are under the obligation to give any public information. This cannot be confirmed.

== KMS ==
KMS passed €400,000 in cash primarily to the conservative National Coalition Party or rural Centre Party (Finland). The organisation Kehittyvien maakuntien Suomi (KMS) (English: Finland of Developing Regions) supported at least 21 Centrist, 13 conservative, one green (who jumped into the conservative faction), and 4 social democratic members of the parliament in 2007–2011. The support was typically 5,000-€10,000 pro person. 90% of its funds were from three companies: Nova Group (Tapani Yli-Saunamäki) €145,000 (36%), Suomen Liikekiinteistöt SLK (Kyösti Kakkonen) €120,000 (30%) and Maskun kalustetalo (Toivo Sukari) €100,000 (25%). These companies were connected with large construction projects of shopping centres and the promotion of a new construction law. The prosecution sought in 2011 unconditional prison sentences for Merisalo and Yli-Saunamäki as Nova group leaders. Nova's bankruptcy estate demanded 6.2 million euros in damages from Merisalo, Yli-Saunamäki and five others. The defendants denied charges.

Tapani Yli-Saunamäki ran the campaign for Esko Aho (president election, centre) in 2000 and Sauli Niinistö (president election, conservative) in 2006 and Hannu Takkula (EU parliament, Centre). Yli-Saunamäki has also been responsible for the sport sponsoring for Nokia.

Jyri Häkämies (National Coalition Party), the then-Minister of Defence, discussed the KMS funding of the party candidates with Merisalo and Yli-Saunamäki already in the end of 2006 in the House of Parliament. In August 2007 Häkämies invited these KMS financiers to a sauna.

Conservative MP Ilkka Kanerva has been in the bribery trials. All parties are appealing against convictions that started on 25. March 2013 in the broad-ranging election funding scandal connected to the regional construction deals.

== Tax haven financing ==
Jyrki Katainen, Paula Lehtomäki and Jyri Häkämies received campaign support from a company that was owned in Luxembourg and managed from the Virgin Islands. According to Ilta-Sanomat (21.5.2008), support was given by Ahti Vilppula connected to Helsingin Mekaanikontalo. It is owned by Procomex in Luxemburg and further by Kilbrin Investments Limited in the Virgin Islands.

== Court decision ==
The Helsinki Court of Appeal overturned MP Ilkka Kanerva's (National Coalition Party) sentence for acceptance of bribes. In 2012, the District Court found Kanerva guilty of accepting tens of thousands of euros worth of gifts from the executives, who were seen to thereby gain influence over Kanerva's actions as chair of the Regional Council of Southwest Finland. Among other things, the council has decision-making power over the zoning of new shopping centres. The Court of Appeal also overturned the sentences for aggravated bribery of three businessmen, Arto Merisalo, Tapani Yli-Saunamäki and Toivo Sukari. The District Court had sentenced Merisalo and Yli-Saunamäki to long prison terms. General public criticised the decision for accepting bribes in Finland.

== See more ==
- In and Out scandal
