= The Autocrats =

- The initial screen of The Autocrats for the 4th and 5th seasons. Top row from left to right: Ben Zyskowicz, Päivi Räsänen, Mauri Pekkarinen, Tarja Halonen, Seppo Kääriäinen, Anneli Jäätteenmäki, Pentti Arajärvi. Bottom row from left to right: Ville Itälä, Sauli Niinistö, Paavo Lipponen, Erkki Tuomioja, Suvi-Anne Siimes.
- Itse Valtiaat
- Genre: Political satire Animation
- Created by: Olli Haikka; Riina Hyytiä
- Voices of: Mika Ala-Panula; Heikki Hilander; Erja Manto; Jukka Puotila; Paul Westlake; Mari Perankoski
- Country of origin: Finland
- Original language: Finnish language
- No. of seasons: 14
- No. of episodes: 233 (+ 7 extras)

Production
- Running time: 11–15 minutes
- Production company: Oy Filmiteollisuus Fine Ab

Original release
- Network: YLE TV1, nowadays on Yle TV2
- Release: April 14, 2001 – January 5, 2008

The Autocrats (Finnish: Itse valtiaat, stylized as Itse Valtiaat) is a Finnish animated political satire TV series, which takes the viewer behind the scenes of the early 2000s politics of Finland and aired between 2001 and 2008. The series was produced by Oy Filmiteollisuus Fine Ab and was made using 3D computer animation. The original idea for the series came from producer Olli Haikka. 233 episodes – comprising approximately 30 hours of footage – were aired.

== Politicians who appeared in the series ==
- Tarja Halonen
- Pentti Arajärvi
- Paavo Lipponen
- Erkki Tuomioja
- Antti Kalliomäki
- Eero Heinäluoma
- Presidents Mauno Koivisto and Martti Ahtisaari – appeared as an epilogue to every episode, sitting on a park bench.
- Mauri Pekkarinen
- Seppo Kääriäinen
- Anneli Jäätteenmäki
- Esko Aho
- Matti Vanhanen
- Tanja Karpela (Tanja Saarela)
- Paavo Väyrynen
- Sirkka-Liisa Anttila
- Sauli Niinistö
- Ben Zyskowicz
- Suvi Lindén
- Ville Itälä
- Jyrki Katainen
- Ilkka Kanerva
- Suvi-Anne Siimes
- Päivi Räsänen
- Anni Sinnemäki

== Episodes ==
(Original airdate)

=== The Autocrats pilot ===
- Demo: Eskon lähtö (14.4.)

=== Spring 2001 (1st season) ===
- 1. Pääministerin mahtikäsky (14.4.)
- 2. Erkki vastaan Paavo (21.4.)
- 3. Saukko älä jännitä (28.4.)
- 4. Lex Niinistö (5.5.)
- 5. Niinistön paha uni (12.5.)
- 6. Käyrä (19.5.)
- 7. Arajärven lista (26.5.)
- 8. Aate hukassa (2.6.)
- 9. Aho vastaan Aho (9.6.)
- 10. Lindenin tulikaste (16.6.)
- 11. Laulava oppositio (23.6.)
- 12. Poliitikot vastaan kansa (30.6.)

=== Fall 2001 (2nd season) ===
- 13. Hirviövoimala (11.8.)
- 14. Lipposen burnout (18.8.)
- 15. Ben loikkaa (25.8.)
- 16. Lemmikkiä elvytetään (1.9.)
- 17. Räsänen ja pojat (8.9.)
- 18. Tupakkalaki (15.9.)
- 19. Puheripuli (22.9.)
- 20. Lipposen ja Niinistön näytösriita (29.9.)
- 21. Meteoriitti (6.10.)
- 22. Riidankylväjä (13.10.)
- 23. Lapsi eduskunnassa (20.10.)
- 24. Kassakaappisopimus (27.10.)
- 25. Lipponen ja isot pojat (3.11.)
- 26. Lipponen Mr. Niceguy (10.11.)
- 27. Autoilun vapaus (17.11.)
- 28. Rajaton oikeus (24.11.)
- 29. Esko Shakespeare (1.12.)
- 30. Niinistön lähtö (8.12.)
- 31. Aimo porvari (15.12.)
- 32. Ydinkeskusta (22.12.)
- 33. Suomea ei voi tuoda (29.12.)

=== Spring 2002 (3rd season) ===
- 34. Sponsoroitua politiikkaa (5.1.)
- 35. Demarien puheenjohtajakisa (12.1.)
- 36. Tuomioja joutuu vastaamaan sanoistaan (19.1.)
- 37. Ville Itälä - pehmoporvari (26.1.)
- 38. Valtion kassa (2.2.)
- 39. Äärilipponen (9.2.)
- 40. Kriisialue Presidentinlinna (16.2.)
- 41. Räsänen ja keskeinen ongelma (26.2.)
- 42. Naisverkosto (2.3.)
- 43. Ahon läksiäiset (9.3.)
- 44. Riihen kaihoisa kutsu (16.3.)
- 45. Kokoomuksen puheenjohtajan toimenkuva (23.3.)
- 46. Ahon perintö (6.4.)
- 47. Autiosaari (13.4.)
- 48. Lottovoitto (20.4.)
- 49. Halosen kansansuosio (27.4.)
- 50. Hallitustunnusteluja (4.5.)
- 51. Jäätteenmäki vs. Rehn (11.5.)
- 52. Being Ben Zyskowicz (18.5.)
- 53. Kääriäinen puheenjohtajaksi (25.5.)

=== Fall 2002 (4th season) ===
- 54. Voittajien paluu (7.9.)
- 55. Keskusta käy vaalitaistoon (14.9.)
- 56. Halonen vastaan Jäätteenmäki (21.9.)
- 57. Keskustan kannatus (28.9.)
- 58. Entiset johtajat (5.10.)
- 59. Lipponen näkee unia (12.10.)
- 60. Vähemmistöhallitus (19.10.)
- 61. Taksvärkki (26.10.)
- 62. Poliittinen keskustelu (2.11.)
- 63. Kaksi poikaa ja tyttö (9.11.)
- 64. Julkkisehdokkaat (16.11.)
- 65. Puolueet kuriin (23.11.)
- 66. YKsta päivää (30.11.)
- 67. Erkkiä masennetaan (7.12.)
- 68. Benin talli (14.12.)
- 69. Marginaalit haltuun (21.12.)
- Itse valtiaat – Avaruusmusikaali (31.12.)

=== Spring 2003 (5th season) ===
- 70. Yhtiöitystä (18.1.)
- 71. Ryhdy itselliseksi (25.1.)
- 72. Holhousyhteiskunta (1.2.)
- 73. Noottikriisi (8.2.)
- 74. Moses goes Jesus (15.2.)
- 75. Supersankareita (22.2.)
- 76. Hallitus-Popstars (1.3.)
- 77. Henkilövaalit (8.3.)
- 78. Herää pahvi! (15.3.)
- 79. Viimeiset kiusaukset (22.3.)
- 80. Takaisin luontoon (29.3.)
- 81. Öljylähde (5.4.)
- 82. Koukussa (12.4.)
- 83. Mauri palaa loppuun (19.4.)
- 84. Vaihtokauppa (26.4.)
- 85. Ollaan kavereita (3.5.)
- 86. Mestarit areenalla (10.5.)
- 87. Operation ESC (17.5.)

=== Fall 2003 (6th season) ===
- 88. Ruusunnuppu (13.9.)
- 89. Vahva pääministeri (20.9.)
- 90. Kokoomuksen ahdinko (27.9.)
- 91. Omakotitalo rules! (4.10.)
- 92. Luihin ja ytimiin (11.10.)
- 93. Ongelma: alkoholi (18.10.)
- 94. Tarja vs. Matti (25.10.)
- 95. Poliittisten ruumiiden yö (1.11.)
- 96. Antti puolittaa (8.11.)
- 97. Paavon Babylon (15.11.)
- 98. Uusille urille (22.11.)
- 99. Uraani halkeaa (29.11.)
- 100. 200 apinaa (6.12.)
- 101. Toveri Mauri (13.12.)
- 102. Ihmeellinen on eduskunta (20.12.)
- Näin tehdään Itse Valtiaat (29.12.)
- Itse valtiaat – Kuningasmusikaali (31.12.)

=== Spring 2004 (7th season) ===
- 103. Tappajatomaatit (10.1.)
- 104. Demareiden imu (17.1.)
- 105. Eurovaalihuumaa (24.1.)
- 106. Rati riti ralla! (31.1.)
- 107. Minne menet, Nato? (7.2.)
- 108. Poikien välisestä ystävyydestä (14.2.)
- 109. Lähtölaskenta (21.2.)
- 110. ÄKS-arkisto (28.2.)
- 111. Loppusijoitus (6.3.)
- 112. Parkkipaikka (13.3.)
- 113. Erkki vs. Erkki (20.3.)
- 114. Antin kalansaalis (27.3.)
- 115. Pena ja Eki - Auringonlaskun ratsastajat (3.4.)
- 116. Tanjan työpäivä (10.4.)
- 117. Rankka päivä (17.4.)
- 118. Kiina-ilmiö (24.4.)
- 119. Seksiä ja väkivaltaa (1.5.)
- 120. Yhteistyö on voimaa (8.5.)

=== Fall 2004 (8th season) ===
- 121. Pohjoinen ulottuvuus (4.9.)
- 122. Matin painajainen (11.9.)
- 123. Kuka lohduttaisi Tanjaa? (18.9.)
- 124. Operaatio Helsinki (25.9.)
- 125. Matti Vanhasen lentävä sirkus (2.10.)
- 126. Kieltolaki (9.10.)
- 127. Terrorismin vastainen sota (16.10.)
- 128. Kultainen kaatopaikka (23.10.)
- 129. Paavon Zen (30.10.)
- 130. Paavon seuraaja (6.11.)
- 131. Brysselin raakit (13.11.)
- 132. Paavo ja Nato (20.11.)
- 133. Lopullinen ratkaisu (27.11.)
- 134. Antin verovähennys (4.12.)
- 135. Rajaton valta (11.12.)
- 136. Jyrki, joulun lapsi (18.12.)
- Itse valtiaat – Urheilumusikaali (26.12.)

=== Spring 2005 (9th season) ===
- 137. Jyrki Boy (15.1.)
- 138. Tohtori Frankenmauri (22.1.)
- 139. Korpilammen kutsu (29.1.)
- 140. Keskiyön Mauri (5.2.)
- 141. Star Trip (12.2.)
- 142. Tarjan korvanappi (19.2.)
- 143. Verotus kevenee (26.2.)
- 144. Tarjan valinta (5.3.)
- 145. Annin pöksylähetys (12.3.)
- 146. Puhemiehen edustusauto (19.3.)
- 147. Evan salaseura (26.3.)
- 148. Suvi-Anne meklarina (2.4.)
- 149. Putin tarjoaa (9.4.)
- 150. Yhdistynyt oppositio (16.4.)
- 151. Mahdoton tehtävä (23.4.)
- 152. Perintö (30.4.)
- 153. Viimeinen taisto (7.5.)
- 154. Kepulin asteen yhteys (14.5.)

=== Fall 2005 (10th season) ===
- 155. Vaalitaiston virallinen aloitus (3.9.)
- 156. Punakoneen liittymätarjous (10.9.)
- 157. Päivä peruskoulussa (17.9.)
- 158. Vihreiden puiseva peruna (24.9.)
- 159. Titanic (1.10.)
- 160. Loanheiton SM-kisat (8.10.)
- 161. Mafiaveljet (15.10.)
- 162. Lintukodossa kuohuu (22.10.)
- 163. Presidenttiyden hinta (29.10.)
- 164. Presidenttiehdokkaat karkuteillä (5.11.)
- 165. Muunnellun totuuden hetki (12.11.)
- 166. Viimeinen lupaus (19.11.)
- 167. Kova vai pehmeä Sauli? (26.11.)
- 168. Demarihengen joululahja (3.12.)
- 169. Uusi tuleminen (10.12.)
- 170. Hyvinvoinnin lähteillä (17.12.)
- Itse valtiaat – Agenttimusikaali (30.12.)

=== Spring 2006 (11th season) ===
- 171. Viimeinen sanasota (14.1.)
- 172. Mihin menet, Suomi-neito? (21.1.)
- 173. Kepun miesten luonto (28.1.)
- 174. Naisverkosto lasikatolla (4.2.)
- 175. Stokka-syndrooma (11.2.)
- 176. Poliittinen eläin (18.2.)
- 177. Hedelmällinen juttu (25.2.)
- 178. Työväen budjetti (4.3.)
- 179. Benin uusi elämä (11.3.)
- 180. Matin syöksykierre (18.3.)
- 181. Päiväni vasemmistojohtajana (25.3.)
- 182. Kakkoskauden kriisi (1.4.)
- 183. Suvi-Anne kulissien takana (8.4.)
- 184. Rakas johtaja Eero (22.4.)
- 185. Politiikan myytinmurtajat (29.4.)
- 186. Puuta heinäsuopaa (6.5.)

=== Fall 2006 (12th season) ===
- 187. Yksi pieni kysymys (9.9.)
- 188. Eeron imagokampanja (16.9.)
- 189. Erkin poliittinen historia (23.9.)
- 190. EU-spesiaali (30.9.)
- 191. Päivin luusoppa (7.10.)
- 192. Ruusun nimi (14.10.)
- 193. Poliittisen kulttuurin kaanon (21.10.)
- 194. Paavon viimeiset kiusaukset (28.10.)
- 195. Tietomurto presidentinlinnassa (4.11.)
- 196. Menokehys pettää (11.11.)
- 197. Jyrkin radikaali veto (18.11.)
- 198. Lausuntoautomaatin aika (25.11.)
- 199. Sähköinen tapaaminen (2.12.)
- 200. On totuuskomission aika (9.12.)
- 201. Idän ihme puhuu (16.12.)
- Itse valtiaat -länkkäri: Haaveratsastajat (30.12.)

=== Spring 2007 (13th season) ===
- 202. Vaalien pelko (6.1.)
- 203. Kassakaappisopimus (13.1.)
- 204. Vallankaappaus (20.1.)
- 205. Ylähuone (27.1.)
- 206. Parantumaton tauti (3.2.)
- 207. Työn orjat (10.2.)
- 208. Uusi kieltolaki (17.2.)
- 209. Eero Tavaa jo (24.2.)
- 210. Skuru Sörkkään (3.3.)
- 211. Demokratian itsepuolustus (10.3.)
- 212. Eläinten valtakunta (17.3.)
- 213. Kuninkaat ja moukat (24.3.)
- 214. Lautasellinen vaalilupauksia (31.3.)
- 215. Mafian oppitunti (14.4.)
- 216. Vessallakin on korvat (21.4.)
- 217. Paras iskupaikka (28.4.)
- 218. Demarien syntilista (5.5.)
- 219. Totuuskomissio (19.5.)
- 220. Kymmenes käsky (26.5.)
- 221. Biomassaa massoille (2.6.)

=== Fall 2007 (14th season) ===
- 222. Puppusanageneraattori (20.10.)
- 223. Via dolorosa Lipponensis (27.10.)
- 224. Pyydä anteeks! (3.11.)
- 225. On totuuden aika (10.11.)
- 226. Tapaus 141 (17.11.)
- 227. Hybris Politus Renesansius (24.11.)
- 228. Kadonneen aatteen metsästäjät (1.12.)
- 229. Sosialidemokratian lapset (8.12.)
- 230. Sananvapauden tuulimyllyt (15.12.)
- 231. Listojen yö (22.12.)
- 232. Eduskunnan karnevaalipäivä (29.12.)
- 233. Vieroitusklinikka (5.1.)

=== Extra episode ===
- Itse valtiaat – Matkustusturvallisuus (2008)

== Other The Autocrats publications ==
In addition to the TV series, The Autocrats series also includes:

=== Movie ===
- The Emperor's Secret (Keisarin salaisuus, 2006)

=== TV-movies ===
- Avaruusmusikaali (2002)
- Kuningasmusikaali (2003)
- Urheilumusikaali (2004)
- Agenttimusikaali (2005)
- Länkkäri: Haaveratsastajat (2006)

=== Documentary ===
- Näin tehdään Itse Valtiaat (2003)

=== Pilot episode ===
- Itse valtiaat pilotti – Demo: Eskon lähtö (2001)

=== Extra episode ===
- Matkustusturvallisuus (2008)

=== CD-albums ===
- Menneisyyden vangit (2002)
- 200 apinaa – Paavo kuninkaaksi (2003)
- Luuserien olympialaiset (2004)
- Kun mikään ei riitä (2005)

=== CD-singles ===
- Jätä rauhaan mun siili!/Pahat pojat (2002)
- 200 apinaa (2003)
- My Heart Bleeds for You (2003)

=== DVD ===
- The Autocrats #1: Avaruusmusikaali + Operation ESC (2003)
- The Autocrats #2: 6th season (fall 2003) + Näin tehdään Itse Valtiaat (2004)
- The Autocrats #3: Kuningasmusikaali + 7th season (spring 2004) (2004)
- The Autocrats #4: Urheilumusikaali + 8th season (fall 2004) (2005)
- The Autocrats Arkistojen aarteita: Spring 2001 and from fall 2001 episodes 1 to 17 (2005)
- The Autocrats Arkistojen aarteita: Fall 2001 episodes 18 to 33 (2005)
- The Autocrats Arkistojen aarteita: Spring 2002 episodes 34 to 50 (2005)
- The Autocrats #5: Agenttimusikaali + 13 best voted episodes (2006)

=== Comic books ===
- Three The Autocrats -comic book albums (2002–03)
- Kuningassatu - festschrift (2004)

=== Other ===
- Masks of Tarja Halonen, Erkki Tuomioja, Paavo Lipponen, Anneli Jäätteenmäki, Ben Zyskowicz and Sauli Niinistö (2003)
- A wall calendar (2005)

== See also ==
- List of computer-animated television series
- List of Finnish television series
