= Kimmo Tiilikainen =

Finnish politician

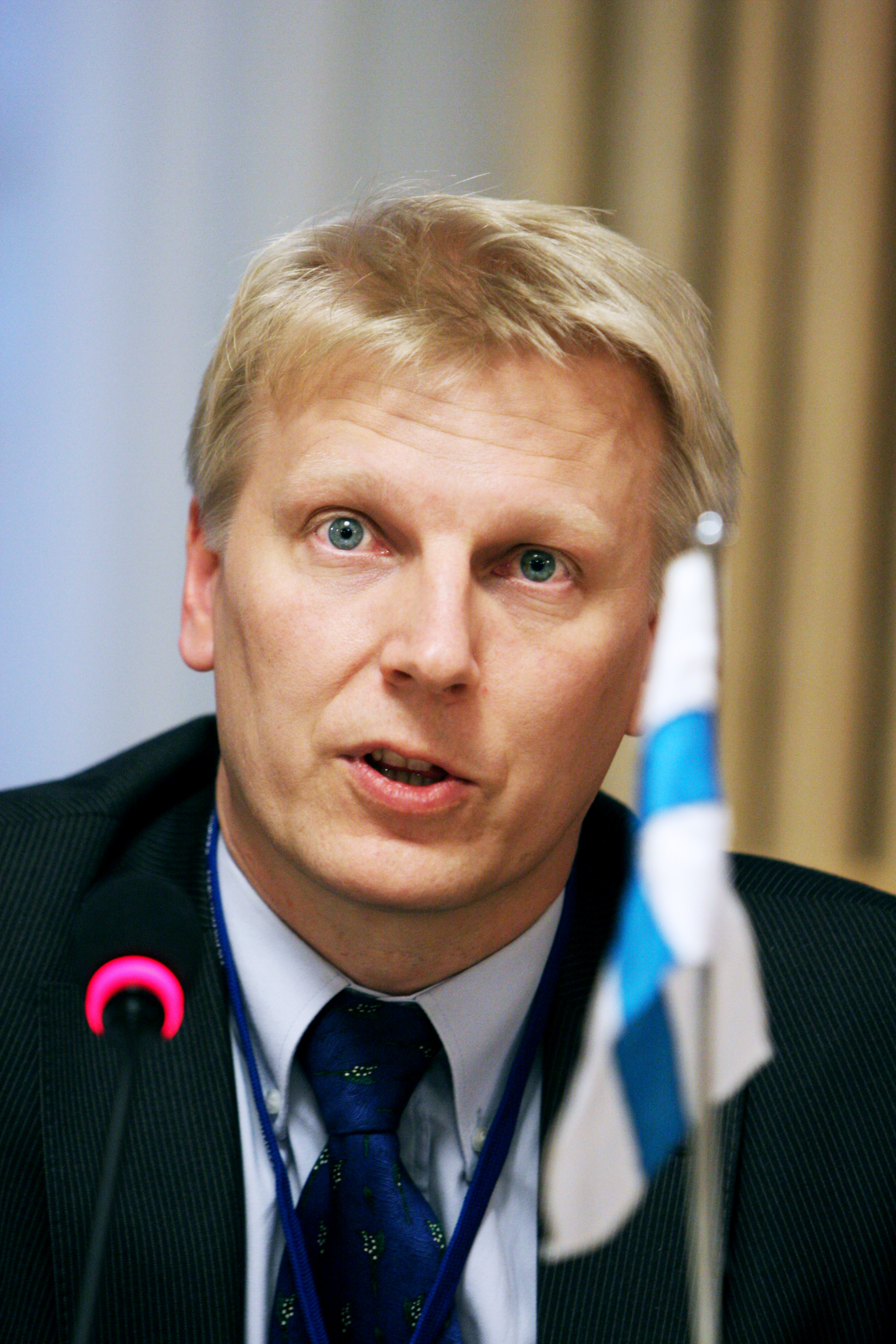
- Kimmo Tiilikainen in 2007.

Minister of Housing, Energy and the Environment
- In office 29 May 2015 – 6 June 2019
- Prime Minister: Juha Sipilä
- Preceded by: Petteri Orpo (agriculture); Sanni Grahn-Laasonen (environment)
- Succeeded by: Jari Leppä(agriculture)

Minister of Environment
- In office 28 September 2007 – 10 April 2008
- Prime Minister: Matti Vanhanen
- Preceded by: Paula Lehtomäki
- Succeeded by: Paula Lehtomäki

Personal details
- Born: 17 August 1966 (age 59) Ruokolahti, Finland
- Party: Centre Party

Kimmo Kalevi Tiilikainen (born 17 August 1966, Ruokolahti) is a Finnish politician from the Centre Party. He is an organic farmer and forester. Tiilikainen served as the Minister of Agriculture and the Environment from 2015 to 2019. He is also a former Minister of the Environment of Finland from 2007 to 2008.

Currently Tiilikainen is the Chairman of the Centre Party Parliamentary Group and a member of the Finnish Parliament. He is also a city council member in his home municipality in Ruokolahti.

== Early career ==
Tiilikainen graduated in 1991 from the University of Joensuu as a Master of Science in Agriculture and Forestry.

In the beginning of 1990's Tiilikainen was elected as the chairman of Finnish Organic Food Association. He made his first attempt to the Finnish Parliament as a nonaligned candidate on the list of the Green League. He switched to the Centre Party in 1997 explaining that "the Greens were not ecological enough".

Tiilikainen was elected to the Finnish Parliament on his third attempt in 2003.

== Other activities ==
- United Nations Environment Programme (UNEP), Vice President of the Bureau of the Assembly (2018–2019)

Political offices
Preceded by Paula Lehtomäki	Minister of the Environment of Finland; September 2007–April 2008	Succeeded by Paula Lehtomäki
