= Vanhanen II cabinet =

70th cabinet of Finland

Vanhanen's Second Cabinet
- 70th Cabinet of Finland

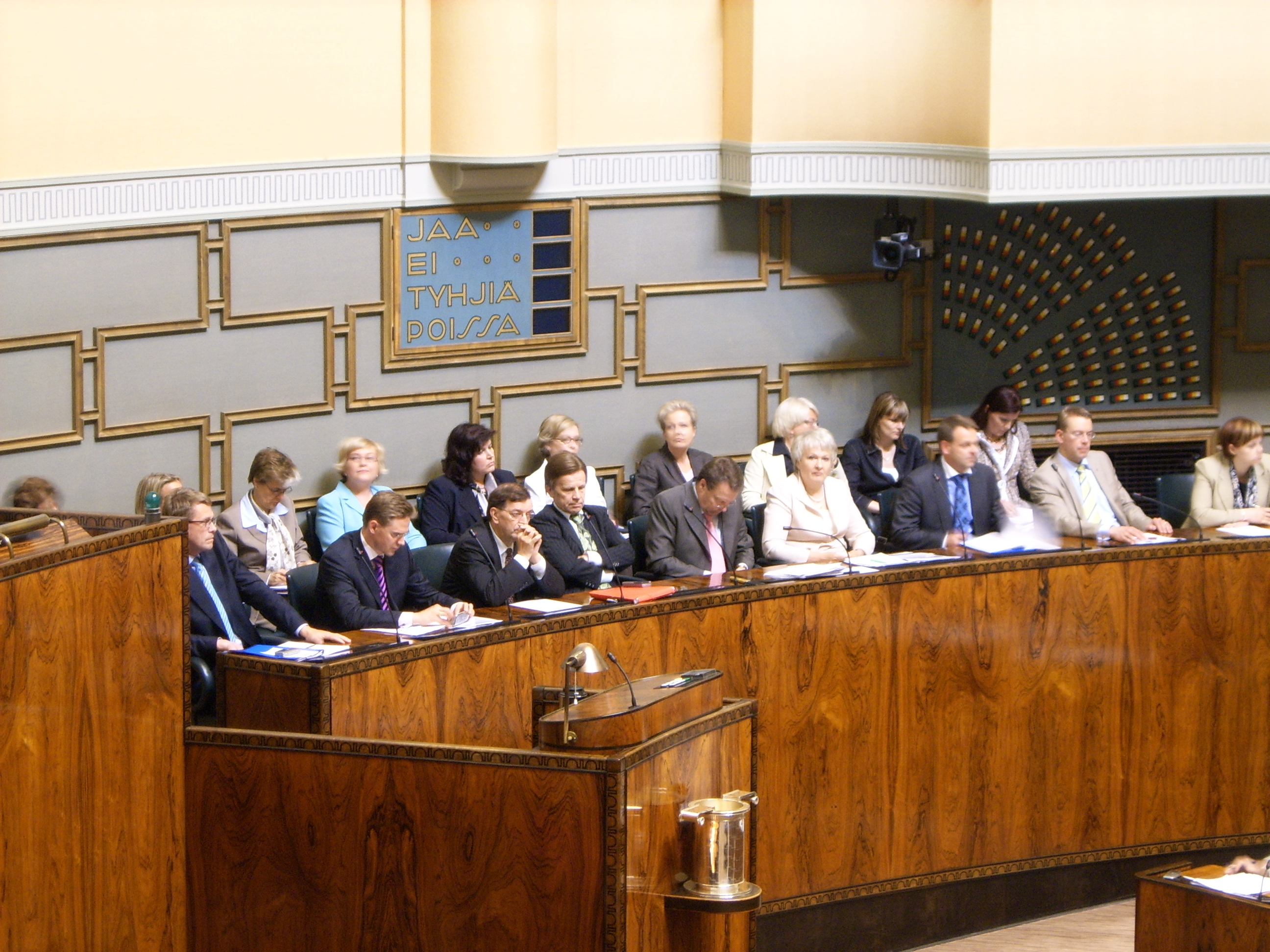
- Matti Vanhanen's second cabinet
- Date formed: 19 April 2007
- Date dissolved: 20 June 2010

People and organisations
- Head of state: Tarja Halonen
- Head of government: Matti Vanhanen
- Member parties: Centre Party; National Coalition Party; Green League; Swedish People's Party
- Status in legislature: Majority (coalition)

History
- Election: 2007 Finnish parliamentary election
- Predecessor: Vanhanen I Cabinet
- Successor: Kiviniemi Cabinet

The second cabinet of Matti Vanhanen was the 70th cabinet and Government of Finland. The cabinet held office from 19 April 2007 to 20 June 2010. The cabinet was a centrist coalition, consisting of four parties: the Centre Party, the National Coalition Party, the Green League and the Swedish People's Party.

During Vanhanen's second cabinet, for the first time in history, there were more women (12) than men (8) in a Finnish government.

Portfolio	Minister	Took office	Left office	Party
Prime Minister	Matti Vanhanen	19 April 2007	22 June 2010	Centre
Minister for Finance; Deputy Prime Minister	Jyrki Katainen	19 April 2007	22 June 2010	National Coalition
Minister of Public Administration and Local Government	Mari Kiviniemi	19 April 2007	22 June 2010	Centre
Minister for Foreign Affairs	Ilkka Kanerva	19 April 2007	4 April 2008	National Coalition
Minister for Foreign Affairs	Alexander Stubb	4 April 2008	22 June 2010	National Coalition
Minister for Foreign Trade and Development	Paavo Väyrynen	19 April 2007	22 June 2010	Centre
Minister for Defence	Jyri Häkämies	19 April 2007	22 June 2010	National Coalition
Minister for Interior	Anne Holmlund	19 April 2007	22 June 2010	National Coalition
Minister for Europe and immigration	Astrid Thors	19 April 2007	22 June 2010	RKP
Minister for Justice	Tuija Brax	19 April 2007	22 June 2010	Green
Minister for Education	Sari Sarkomaa	19 April 2007	19 December 2008	National Coalition
Minister for Education	Henna Virkkunen	19 December 2008	22 June 2010	National Coalition
Minister for Culture and Sports	Stefan Wallin	19 April 2007	22 June 2010	RKP
Minister for Agriculture and Forestry	Sirkka-Liisa Anttila	19 April 2007	22 June 2010	Centre
Minister for Transport	Anu Vehviläinen	19 April 2007	22 June 2010	Centre
Minister for Communications	Suvi Lindén	19 April 2007	22 June 2010	National Coalition
Minister of Economic Affairs	Mauri Pekkarinen	19 April 2007	22 June 2010	Centre
Minister for Social Affairs and Health	Liisa Hyssälä	19 April 2007	24 May 2010	Centre
Minister for Social Affairs and Health	Juha Rehula	24 May 2010	22 June 2010	Centre
Minister for Health and Social Services	Paula Risikko	19 April 2007	22 June 2010	National Coalition
Minister for Labour	Tarja Cronberg	19 April 2007	26 June 2009	Green
Minister for Labour	Anni Sinnemäki	26 June 2009	22 June 2010	Green
Minister for Environment	Paula Lehtomäki	19 April 2007	22 June 2010	Centre
Minister for Housing	Jan Vapaavuori	19 April 2007	22 June 2010	National Coalition

Preceded by Matti Vanhanen's first cabinet	Cabinet of Finland; 19 April 2007 – 22 June 2010	Succeeded by Mari Kiviniemi's cabinet
