= Ahti (disambiguation) =

Ahti is a heroic character of Finnish Folk poetry.

Ahti may also refer to:

- Ahti (Egyptian deity), a malevolent hippopotamus goddess
- 2826 Ahti, an asteroid, named after the Finnish myth character

== People ==
=== Given name ===
- Ahti Heinla (born 1972), Estonian programmer and entrepreneur
- Ahti Karjalainen (1923–1990), Finnish politician
- Ahti Kõo (born 1952), Estonian politician
- Ahti Pekkala (1924–2014), Finnish politician
- Ahti Seppet (born 1953), Estonian sculptor
- Ahti Toivanen (born 1990), Finnish biathlete
- Ahti Vilppula (born 1959), Finnish businessman

=== Surname ===
- Risto Ahti (born 1943), Finnish writer
- Teuvo Ahti (born 1934), Finnish lichenologist

=== Fictional ===
- Ahti, a video game character from Control and Alan Wake 2 games
