= Anneli Taina =

Finnish politician (born 1951)

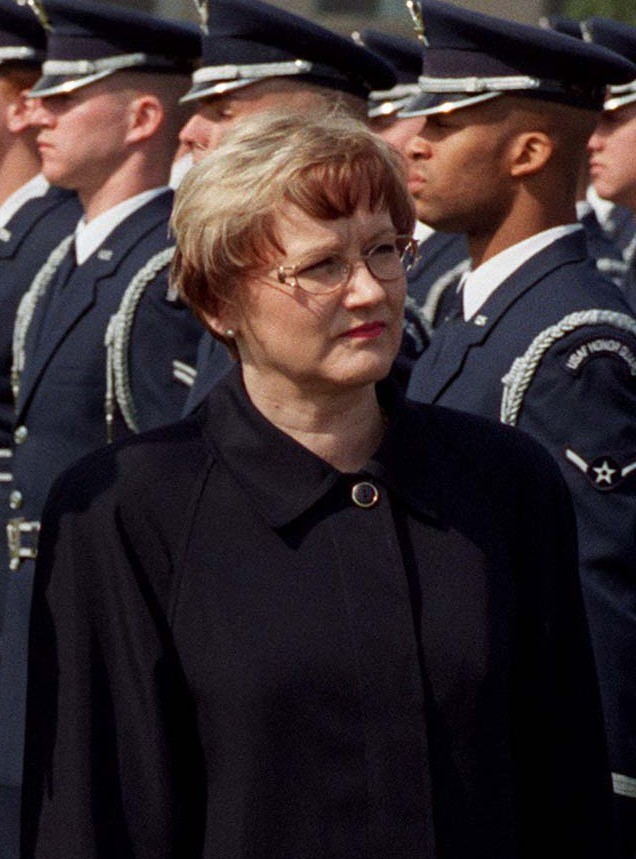
- Anelli Taina in 1988

Governor of the Southern Finland Province
- In office 2004–2009
- President: Tarja Halonen
- Prime Minister: Matti Vanhanen
- Preceded by: Tuula Linnainmaa

Minister of Defence
- In office 13 April 1995 – 15 April 1999
- Prime Minister: Paavo Lipponen
- Preceded by: Jan-Erik Enestam
- Succeeded by: Jan-Erik Enestam

Minister of Housing
- In office 2 January 1995 – 13 April 1995
- Prime Minister: Paavo Lipponen
- Preceded by: Pirjo Rusanen
- Succeeded by: Jan Vapaavuori

Member of the Finnish Parliament
- In office 21 March 1987 – 23 March 1999
- Constituency: Pirkanmaa

Personal details
- Born: 21 June 1951 (age 75) Imatra, Finland
- Spouse: Heikki Taina (1972-present)

Anneli Taina (born June 21, 1951) is a Finnish politician who was Minister of Defence and Minister of Housing for the Finnish Government, and then Governor of the Southern Finland Province.

== Career ==
Anneli Taina was born on June 21, 1951, in Imatra, Finland, which is located on the border with Russia in the east of the country. She trained in social work, earning a Master's degree in social studies in 1975. She then worked for ten years between 1977 and 1987 as a social worker in Tampere, Southern Finland. During this time, she won a seat on the Tampere City Council, and was a school board member. as part of her council role, she sat on the Urban Planning Committee.

In 1987, she successfully ran to become a Member of Parliament. Taina then set on several committees such as the Social Affairs and Health Committee, Labour, and the Grand Committee. In 1995, she was named to the Council of State as Minister of Housing, later that year being moved to become Minister of Defence. This was only the second time that a woman had been named as a Minister of Defence in Finland, after Elisabeth Rehn, who held the post earlier in 1995.

Taina held the position until 1999, and continued as a Member of Parliament until 1999. She then became Governor of the Southern Finland Province in 2004, a position she held until 2009, when she became Senior Vice President of the Regional Development Agency of Southern Finland until retirement in 2014.
