= Jan Vapaavuori =

Finnish politician

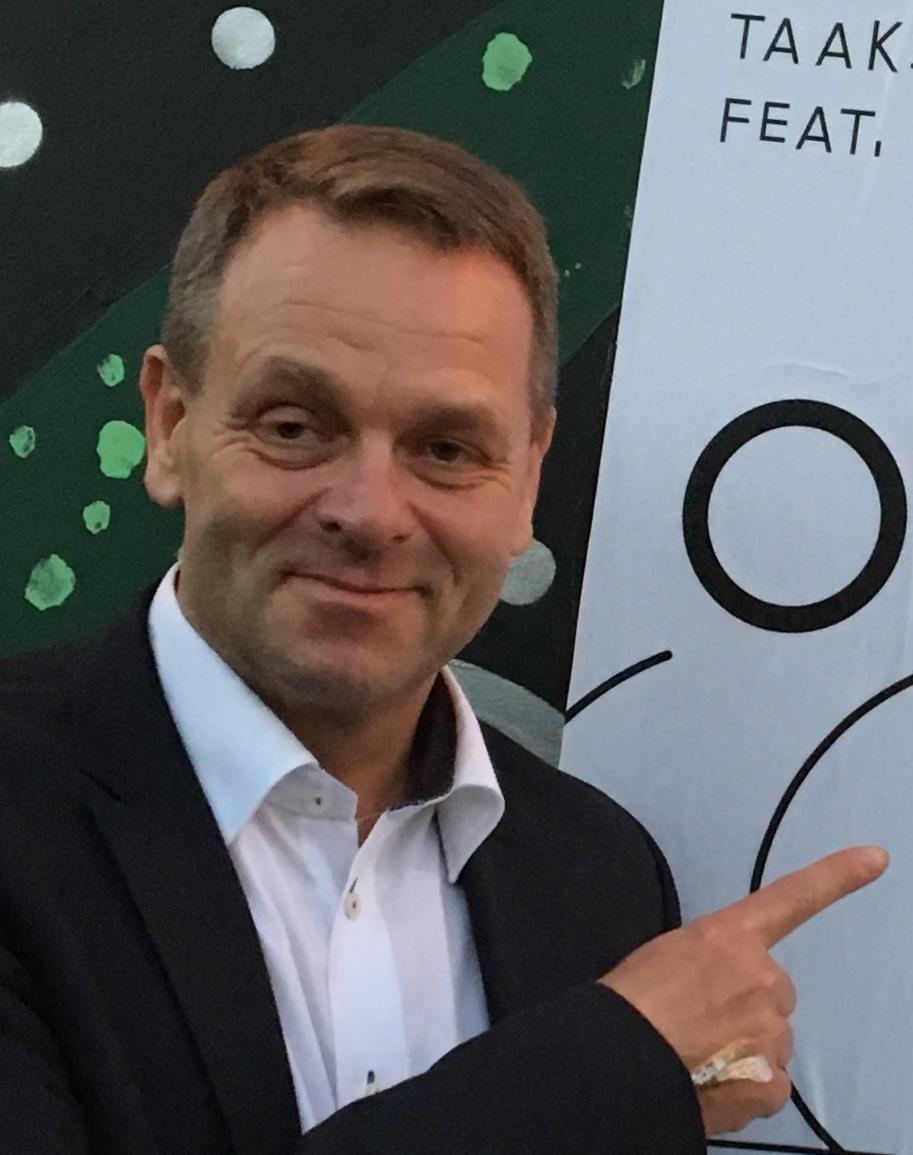

1st Mayor of Helsinki
- In office 1 June 2017 – 2 August 2021
- Preceded by: Jussi Pajunen
- Succeeded by: Juhana Vartiainen

Minister of Economic Affairs
- In office 16 November 2012 – 29 May 2015
- Prime Minister: Jyrki Katainen; Alexander Stubb
- Preceded by: Jyri Häkämies
- Succeeded by: Olli Rehn

Minister of Housing
- In office 19 April 2007 – 22 June 2011
- Prime Minister: Matti Vanhanen; Mari Kiviniemi
- Preceded by: Anneli Taina
- Succeeded by: Krista Kiuru

Personal details
- Born: 3 April 1965 (age 61) Helsinki, Finland
- Party: National Coalition Party
- Education: University of Helsinki; Hanken School of Economics

Jan Pellervo Vapaavuori (born 3 April 1965) is a Finnish politician, the former Minister of Economic Affairs, and the former mayor of Helsinki. Vapaavuori was Minister of Housing and Minister of Nordic Cooperation in Matti Vanhanen's second cabinet and Mari Kiviniemi's cabinet. He was a candidate for the head of his party (the centre-right National Coalition Party) in the June 2014 election, and as part of that the likeliest interim Prime Minister of Finland. However he eventually failed to make the eventual head-to-head round within the Coalition Party, which saw Alexander Stubb defeat Paula Risikko.

Vapaavuori has been a Helsinki City Council member since 1997. He has been a member of the Parliament since 2003, from the constituency of Helsinki, and he represents the National Coalition Party. From 2011 to 2012 he was the chairman of the party's parliamentary group. Vapaavuori was elected Mayor of Helsinki in 2017. His term started on 1 June 2017. In November 2020 Vapaavuori announced that he will not be seeking re-election and plans to retire from politics.

Vapaavuori acquired a law degree from University of Helsinki in 1989. He continued his studies in Helsinki, Uppsala, The Hague and Hanken School of Economics as well. He has worked in the National Union of University Students in Finland.

Vapaavuori was born into a bilingual family: his father, Panu, is a Finnish jurist and mother, Gun, was a Swedish teacher. He is married to Outi Laitinen-Vapaavuori, a doctor of veterinary medicine.
