= The Emperor's Secret =

2006 Finnish animated film

- Finnish release poster
- Finnish: Keisarin salaisuus
- Directed by: Riina Hyytiä
- Written by: Aleksi Bardy; Mika Ripatti; Seppo Vesiluoma
- Based on: The Autocrats TV series created by Olli Haikka and Riina Hyytiä
- Produced by: Aleksi Bardy; Olli Haikka; Riina Hyytiä
- Starring: Mika Ala-Panula; Anna Bentley; Heikki Hilander; Erja Manto; Jukka Puotila; Krisse Salminen
- Production company: Helsinki-filmi Oy
- Distributed by: Finnkino (Finland)
- Release date: 8 September 2006 (Finland)
- Running time: 85 minutes
- Country: Finland
- Language: Finnish
- Budget: €825,000

The Emperor's Secret (Finnish: Keisarin salaisuus), released on 8 September 2006, is the first Finnish computer-animated feature film.

== Plot ==
The film stars the familiar characters from the Finnish TV show The Autocrats (a political satire of Finnish politics) in a fairy tale where the inhabitants of a small Finnish village have to defend themselves against a despotic emperor.

== Voice cast ==
- Mika Ala-Panula
- Anna Bentley
- Heikki Hilander
- Erja Manto
- Jukka Puotila
- Krisse Salminen

== See also ==
- List of animated feature films
- List of computer-animated films
