= Susan Ruusunen =

Susan Kristiina Ruusunen, formerly Kuronen (born 25 September 1970), is Finnish woman who became known for having a relationship with Finland's then prime minister, Matti Vanhanen. The couple had met via an Internet dating service. The relationship lasted less than a year and ended in 2006.

In February 2007, Kuronen published a book, Pääministerin morsian (The Prime Minister's Bride, ISBN 978-952-99593-4-1), where she discloses details about the relationship. Based on a personal diary and text messages sent during the affair, the book caused a lot of media attention.

In October 2007, Ruusunen was charged with violation of the right to privacy over the publication of her book. Prime minister Vanhanen claimed €1,000 in damages from the publisher, but made no claims against Ruusunen. In 2010, the Supreme Court of Finland convicted Ruusunen and the book's publisher for disclosing information about someone's private life. They both received a fine, and the publisher was ordered to pay Vanhanen 1,000 euros for emotional damages.

Ruusunen has three adult children and she works as a caterer.
