= Mauri Pekkarinen =

Finnish politician (born 1947)

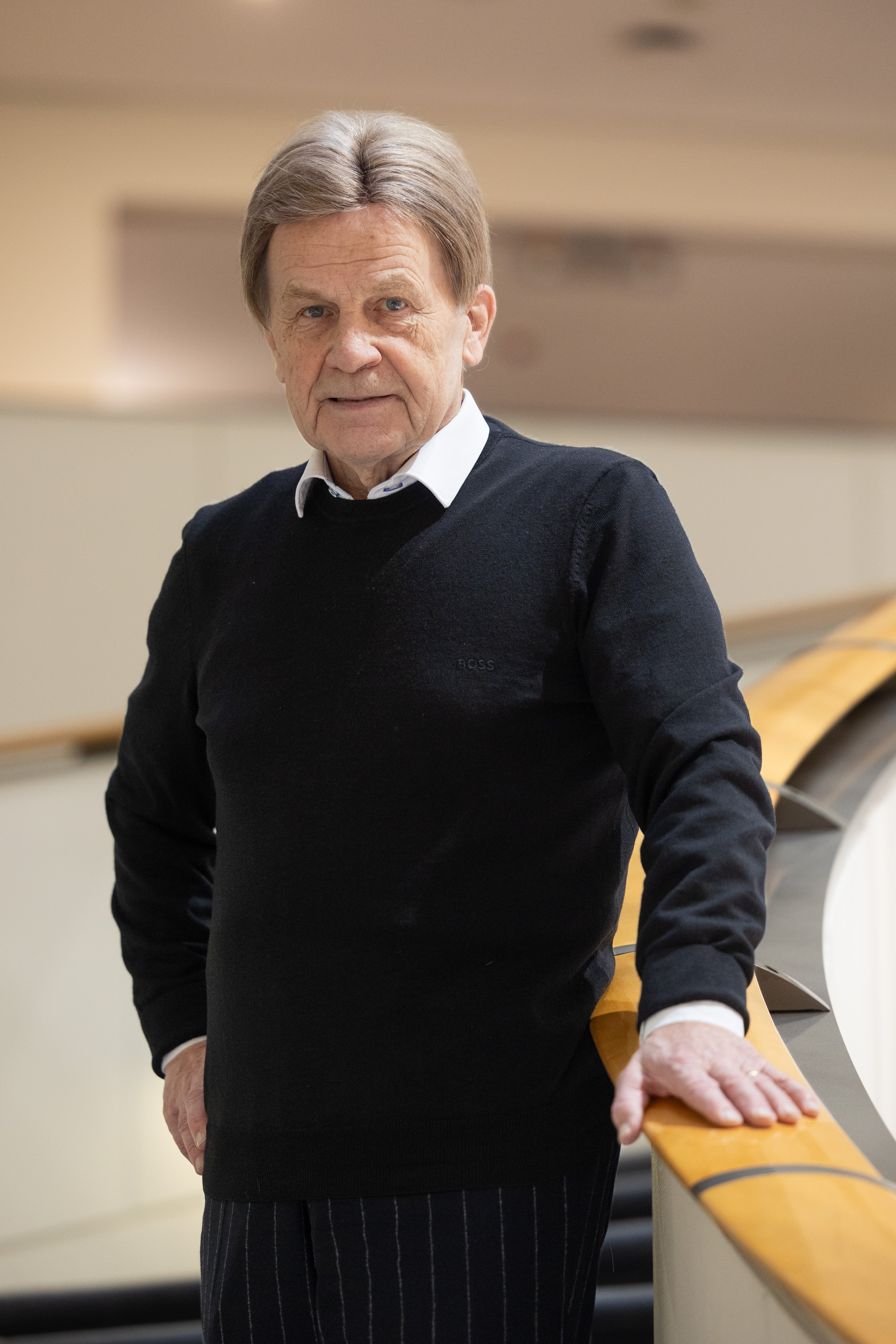

Minister of Economic Affairs
- In office 1 January 2008 – 22 June 2011
- Prime Minister: Matti Vanhanen; Mari Kiviniemi
- Preceded by: Office established
- Succeeded by: Jyri Häkämies

Minister of Trade and Industry
- In office 17 April 2003 – 1 January 2008
- Prime Minister: Anneli Jäätteenmäki; Matti Vanhanen
- Preceded by: Sinikka Mönkäre
- Succeeded by: Office abolished

Minister of the Interior
- In office 26 April 1991 – 13 April 1995
- Prime Minister: Esko Aho
- Preceded by: Jarmo Rantanen
- Succeeded by: Jan-Erik Enestam

Member of European Parliament
- In office 2 July 2019 – 15 July 2024
- Constituency: Finland

Member of Finnish Parliament
- In office 24 March 1979 – 16 April 2019
- Constituency: Central Finland

Personal details
- Born: 6 October 1947 (age 78) Kinnula, Finland
- Party: Centre Party
- Spouse: Raija Pekkarinen (m. 1972)
- Children: 2
- Education: University of Jyväskylä

Reijo Mauri Matias Pekkarinen (born 6 October 1947, in Kinnula, Finland) is a Finnish politician. He most recently served as a Member of European Parliament for Finland between 2019 and 2024. He is the Centre Party of Finland (Suomen Keskusta) deputy and secretary, having served in various cabinet position in the Finnish government, including as Minister of Economic Affairs, Minister of Trade and Industry, and Minister of the Interior, as well as a member of parliament. He is known by the nickname "The Parliament Terrier".

== Early life and education ==
Pekkarinen was born into a farmer's family in Kinnula, to father Niilo Matti Pekkarinen (1922–2004), and mother Hellin Inkeri (née Kinnunen, 1929–2018). He graduated from high school in Kannus in 1968.

Pekkarinen first became interested in politics as a student at the University of Jyväskylä in the late 1960s and early 1970s, from where he graduated with a Master's in Social Studies in 1974. He had long held an interest in economics and society and began to take part in party politics at the age of 24.

== Career ==
=== Early political career & Minister of the Interior ===
In 1979 Pekkarinen was first elected to parliament in the Central Finland constituency, after which he was re-elected with an increased vote share in 1983, 1987, and 1991.

After the 1991 election victory he was named Minister of the Interior in the Aho Cabinet. He served in this position for a full parliamentary term until 1995, when Aho's Centre Party lost the parliamentary majority to the Social Democrats in the parliamentary elections.

=== Minister of Trade and Industry ===
In 2003, Pekkarinen was named the Minister of Trade and Industry in the Jäätteenmäki Cabinet. As new Minister of Trade and Industry, he stated his goal to "promote entrepreneurship and economic growth and thus contribute to diminishing unemployment, [and] to tackle large issues in the field of energy policy such as the carbon dioxide emissions trade between companies in the EU and the building a new nuclear power reactor in Finland", and has also stated an interest in preserving good relations with France. In 2008 his title was changed to Minister of Economic Affairs, a position in which he remained until 2011.

During his tenure as Minister of Trade and Industry, Pekkarinen was portrayed in the Finnish political satire TV series The Autocrats in the early 2000s.

==== Taxes ====
Mauri Pekkarinen suggested higher food VAT to collect more taxes in January 2014. Reduction of the food VAT was an election theme in 2007 Finnish parliamentary election. Half of the promised food VAT reduction after the elections was implemented as a reduction of VAT on food served in restaurants. Pekkarinen's suggestion of 2014 did not include a cancellation of the reduced restaurant VAT.

=== Member of European Parliament ===
At the 2019 European Parliament Elections Pekkarinen was voted into the European Parliament with 68,487 votes.

== Personal life ==
Pekkanen married his wife Raija in 1972. Together they have four children; two sons and two daughters.

In addition to politics, Pekkarinen is an avid athlete, and is a noted long distance runner.

== See also ==
- The Autocrats
- 2007 Finnish campaign finance scandal
