= Jyri Häkämies =

Finnish politician

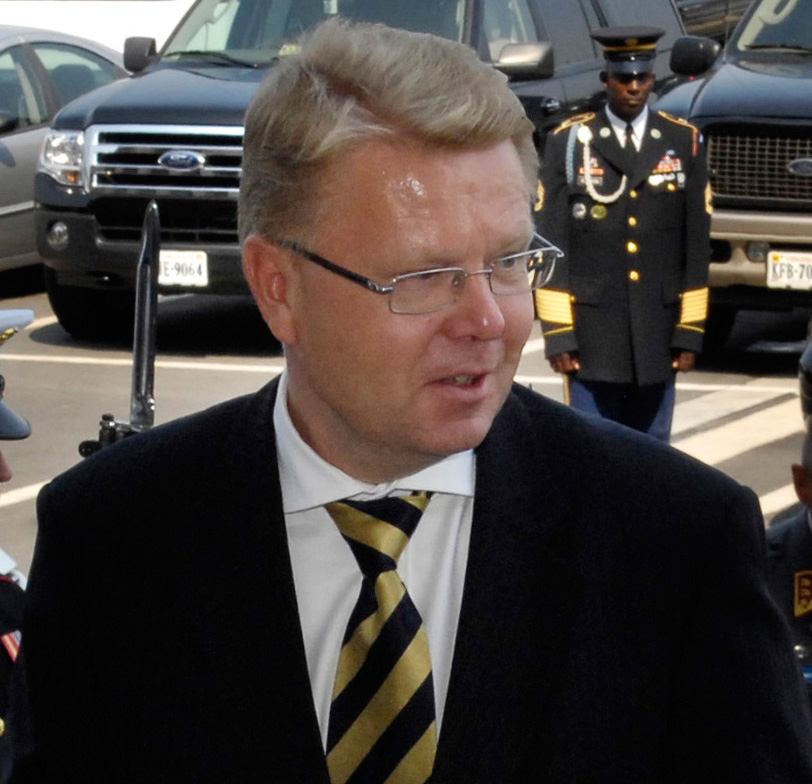

Minister of Economic Affairs
- In office 22 June 2011 – 16 November 2012
- Prime Minister: Jyrki Katainen
- Preceded by: Mauri Pekkarinen
- Succeeded by: Jan Vapaavuori

Minister of Defence
- In office 19 April 2007 – 22 June 2011
- Prime Minister: Matti Vanhanen; Mari Kiviniemi
- Preceded by: Seppo Kääriäinen
- Succeeded by: Stefan Wallin

Member of the Parliament of Finland
- In office 24 March 1999 – 16 November 2012
- Constituency: Kymi

Personal details
- Born: 30 August 1961 (age 64) Karhula, Finland
- Party: National Coalition
- Spouse: Tuija Arhosola-Häkämies

Jyri Jukka Häkämies (born 30 August 1961) is a Finnish politician and the CEO of Confederation of Finnish Industries. He was Finnish Minister of Economic Affairs between 2011 and 2012, and a representative of the National Coalition Party, and the minister responsible for supervision of government enterprises with the exception of Patria, which is supervised by Jan Vapaavuori. He is also a member of the government's finance committee, a board member at YLE, the governmental supervisory board, Kotka city council and the Kymenlaakso regional board, where he is the chairman.

Häkämies was born in Karhula. He holds a master's degree in political science. Before entering the politics, he worked as the CEO of the Kymenlaakso chambers of commerce. Häkämies is a Senior Lieutenant in the military reserve. His older brother, Kari Häkämies, has also been a member of the parliament and government. Jyri Häkämies became the Finnish Minister of Defence in 2007 in Matti Vanhanen's second cabinet.

He was involved in a campaign finance controversy. His campaign received €10,000 from a company, whose representatives were later invited to a sauna evening on Ministry of Defence property, costing taxpayers €300. According to Arto Merisalo, a businessman involved, and later convicted and jailed due to misconduct in a related bankruptcy, Häkämies would participate in selection of candidates for specific campaign funding.

Häkämies worked to improve ethical standards for state-owned enterprises. He has advocated a whistleblower system.

Häkämies launched the largest electric car and electric car charging station project in the country's history.

Häkämies visited China in 2008 on the 19th anniversary of the Tiananmen square protests, but did not discuss human rights matters.

== Environment ==
Environmental politics professor Janne I. Hukkinen University of Helsinki criticized the new environmental administration of Finland. Häkämies was the responsible minister to introduce the new environment administration under the control of employment and business like in Russia. Competitiveness and environment are controlled by the same ministry. When the Talvivaara environmental problems became public, Häkämies resigned the minister job to the new post. Minister Ms. Paula Lehtomäki and Mr. Jyri Häkämies assigned one person responsible for all the permissions and control of the Talvivaara mine environmental control. If understood correctly this person worked before in the field of geology, not environment. Professor Mr. Janne Hukkinen demanded independent environmental administration back that has the opportunity to open critics of the business interests.

== Personal life ==
Häkämies married with Mari Pantsar on 31 December 2015.

== See also ==
- Talvivaara

Political offices
Preceded by Seppo Kääriäinen	Minister of Defence (Finland); 2007–2011	Succeeded by Stefan Wallin
