= Ahti Vilppula =

Finnish businessman (born 1959)

- Born: 1959 (age 66–67)
- Occupation: Businessperson

Ahti Vilppula (born October 1959 or 17 July 1959) is a Finnish businessman. Born in Finland, Vilppula lives abroad but has financial interests in his native country. Vilppula started exporting between the West and the then USSR in Spain. He moved to Brussels when the Soviet Union collapsed. Some companies with which Vilppula is involved have attracted the interest of financial regulators in Belgium, Switzerland, and Luxembourg.

Together with Kai Mäkelä he has over the current decade been a major shareholder in companies such as Saunalahti, Alma Media, Talentum, and Ruukki Group. Vilppula sold a 10 percent stake in Ruukki Group in the Spring of 2008 to the Russian bank VTB.

== Corporate positions ==
Ahti Vilppula was appointed as a director of Goldfields Holding Limited, a mining company, on 16 December 2019; he resigned on 13 May 2020. Vilppula was, however, also listed as a founding director of Goldfields Holding Limited in its initial filing.

== Newspapers and banks buyout ==
In the 1980s, Vilppula with Kai Mäkelä bought large holdings in provincial newspapers. Vilppula bought with private investor Taito Tuunanen shares in the Union Bank of Finland (SYP, today after mergers Nordea) and insurance company Sampo Bank. They sold a quarter of Sampo stock holdings with a considerable profit.

== Kazakhstan ==
Vilppula was the Director of International Operations of the Kazakhstan-based metals and gas giant Euro-Asian Group in 1997. In a few years, the company became a major name in the world of chromium and ferrochromium markets. Vilppula has had close and cordial contacts with a group of billionaires known as the "Kazakhstan Trio," who are suspected by the Belgian authorities of money laundering, counterfeit documents, and links to organized crime.

== South Africa ==
Vilppula became a shareholder in the next port SA Chrome & Alloys in South Africa in 2001.

== United States ==
Vilppula allegedly tried to buy the Pea Ridge Mine in Sullivan, Missouri, according to suit filings.

== Elections ==
Vilppula owned the company Helsingin Mekaanikontalo and in 2007 paid €10,000 in parliamentary elections donations to the National Coalition Party (Eheän Suomen Tuki ry), and to Kymenlaakson Talousseura - in other words to ministers Paula Lehtomäki, Jyrki Katainen, and Jyri Häkämies. All of those who were in receipt of campaign finance funding from Vilppula's company Mekaanikontalo became ministers in Prime Minister Vanhanen's government. The politicians were embarrassingly unaware of their largest backers. Kal Mäkelä and the Ruukki group also donated to support the Center and National Coalition Parties in 2007, and many of the candidates they supported ended up as ministers under Matti Vanhanen.

Lehtomäki, then the Minister of Foreign Trade and Development received €10,000 for the March 2007 elections from Ruukki Group and another 10,000 from Vilppula's Mekaanikontalo.

Ruukki Group has also been a major donor for elections.

== See also ==
- 2007 Finnish parliamentary election
