= Tanja Karpela =

Finnish politician

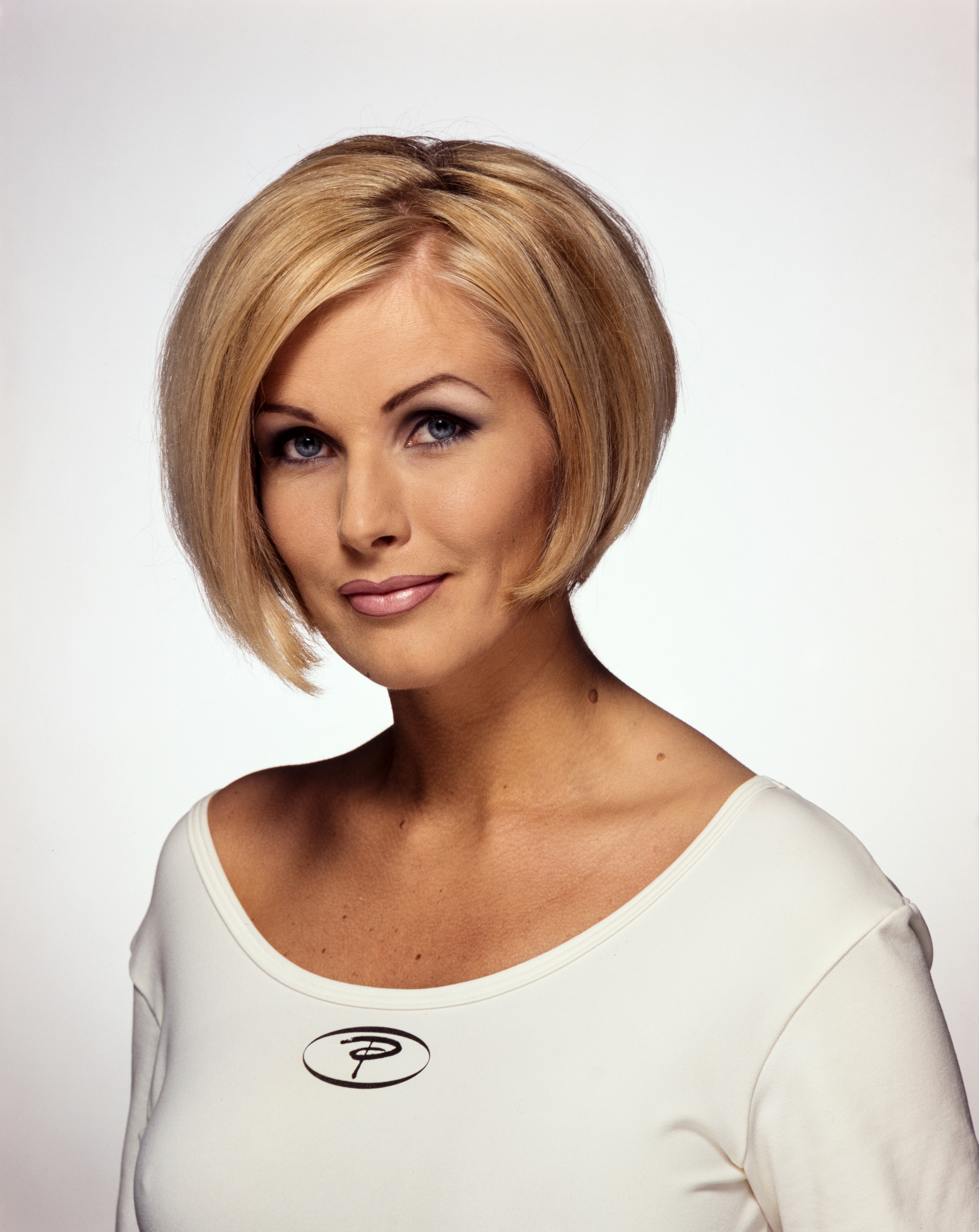

Minister for Culture
- In office 17 April 2003 – 19 April 2007
- Prime Minister: Anneli Jäätteenmäki; Matti Vanhanen
- Preceded by: Kaarina Dromberg
- Succeeded by: Stefan Wallin

Member of Finnish Parliament for Uusimaa
- In office 24 March 1999 – 19 April 2011

Personal details
- Born: 22 August 1970 (age 56) Salo, Finland
- Party: Finnish Centre
- Spouses: Totti Karpela (1995–1999) Olli Saarela (m. 2006; div. 2008) Janne Erjola (m. 2009)
- Children: 3

Tanja Tellervo Karpela (née Vienonen; previously Karpela and Saarela; born 22 August 1970) is a Finnish coach of women's italian football, manager of Women's Serie A, former politician and beauty pageant titleholder who was crowned Miss Finland 1991. She was a Member of Parliament of Finland from 1999 to 2011 and served in the government of Finland as Minister of Culture from 2003 to 2007.

== Life and career ==
Karpela was born in Salo. As a beauty queen, she held the title of Miss Finland and represented her country in the Miss Universe 1991. Prior to her political career, she also became famous for her work as an underwear and lingerie model.

Karpela was elected to parliament from the Electoral District of Uusimaa in 1999, representing the Centre Party. She was appointed Minister of Culture in Prime Minister Anneli Jäätteenmäki's cabinet in 2003. After the resignation of Jäätteenmäki, Karpela went on to serve in the same post under Prime Minister Matti Vanhanen.

In December 2005 Karpela received a Big Brother Award from the Finnish online civil rights organization EFFI for proposing Internet traffic blocking software be installed in schools and libraries. She was also a supporter of the 2005 amendment to the Finnish Copyright Act and Penal Code, which has been nicknamed Lex Karpela due to her acceptance of what many perceive to be a highly controversial addition to the Finnish law. In March 2010, Karpela announced that she is no longer pursuing a parliamentary career following the 2011 parliamentary elections.

In June 2026 Karpela became a coach of women's Italy football and manager of Serie A Women.

== Personal life ==
Karpela is a convicted drunk driver and since entering politics, she has become most famous for her relationships – she has remarried twice and broken off a third, separate engagement. Karpela caused a stir in 2001 when it became public that she (a divorcée) was having a relationship with Finance Minister Sauli Niinistö (a widower). Karpela's Centre Party was in the opposition and Niinistö was considered the second-most influential man in government. Under close press scrutiny ever since, in 2003 Karpela and Niinistö announced their engagement. They broke off their engagement in 2004.

On 21 May 2006, Karpela married film director Olli Saarela, and took her new husband's surname. She filed for divorce from Saarela in November 2007, and on 22 February 2008 she changed her name back to Karpela.

Karpela has two children (born 1995 and 1998) from her previous marriage to Totti Karpela and one (born 2009) from her third marriage to Janne Erjola.

== Honours ==
- Belgium: Grand Cross of the Order of the Crown (2004)
