= Ulla-Maj Wideroos =

Finnish politician (born 1951)

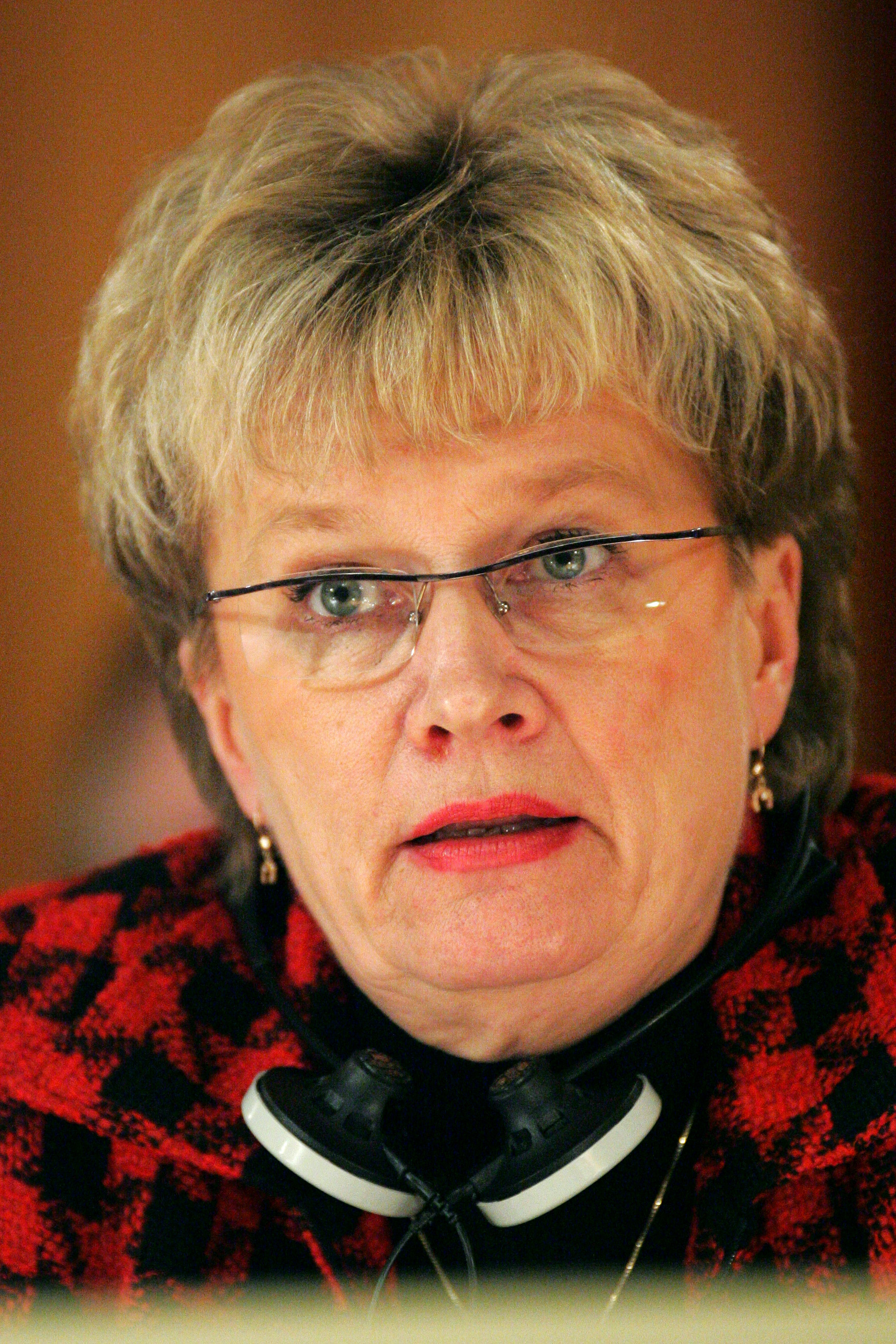
Wideroos in 2004

Ulla-Maj Wideroos (born 22 October 1951 in Jakobstad, Finland) is a Finnish politician and former minister who belongs to the Swedish People's Party. She has an education in economy and trade. Wideroos served as the second Minister of Finance in Matti Vanhanen's first cabinet from 27 April 2003 to 18 April 2007.

She is chairperson of the Swedish Assembly of Finland since April 2007.

Wideroos began her political career in Svensk Ungdom and became the municipal director for Oravais in 1986. She was elected to the government in 1995 and subsequently left the municipal director post.

Wideroos lives in Närpes. She is married and has a son.
