= Stefan Wallin =

Finnish politician (born 1967)

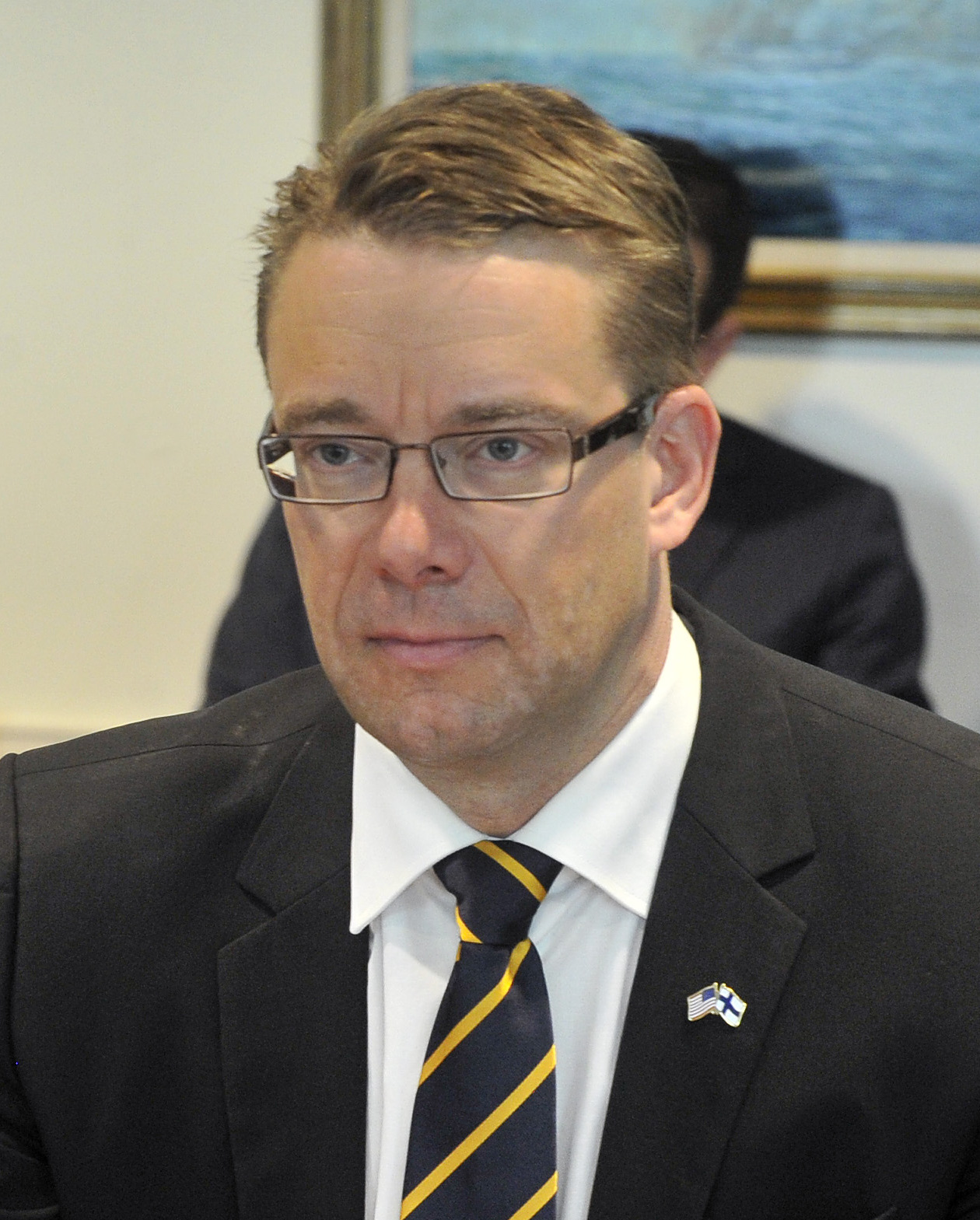
- Stefan Wallin in 2012

Minister of Defence
- In office 22 June 2011 – 5 July 2012
- Prime Minister: Jyrki Katainen
- Preceded by: Jyri Häkämies
- Succeeded by: Carl Haglund

Minister of Culture and Sport
- In office 19 April 2007 – 22 June 2011
- Prime Minister: Matti Vanhanen; Mari Kiviniemi
- Preceded by: Tanja Karpela
- Succeeded by: Paavo Arhinmäki

Minister of the Environment
- In office 1 January 2007 – 19 April 2007
- Prime Minister: Matti Vanhanen
- Preceded by: Jan-Erik Enestam
- Succeeded by: Paula Lehtomäki

Personal details
- Born: 1 June 1967 (age 59) Vaasa, Finland
- Party: Swedish People's Party
- Education: Master of Social Sciences
- Website: Official website

Stefan Erik Wallin (born 1 June 1967 in Vaasa) is a Swedish-speaking Finnish politician. He was Finland's Minister of Culture and Sport in Matti Vanhanen's cabinet 2007–2011, Minister of Defence in Jyrki Katainen's cabinet 2011–2012 and a Member of Parliament 2007–2019.

Wallin was born in Vaasa and studied at Åbo Akademi University in Turku, where he graduated with a Master's Degree in Social Sciences. He worked as a reporter for the newspaper Vasabladet from 1989 to 1993 before acting as a research assistant for the Swedish People's Party. He served as a Special Adviser successively to the Ministers of Transport, European Affairs and Foreign Trade, Interior, and Defence from 1994 to 2000.

He was Deputy Editor-in-Chief and a leader writer for the newspaper Åbo Underrättelser from 2000 to 2005. He then served as State Secretary to the Minister of the Environment from 2005 to 2007.

Wallin was appointed Minister of the Environment and Minister at the Ministry for Foreign Affairs responsible for Nordic Cooperation by President Tarja Halonen on 29 December 2006. He succeeded Jan-Erik Enestam, who was also Wallin's predecessor as chairman of the Swedish People's Party. On 22 June 2011 he was appointed the Minister of Defence. He gave up the position in 2012, when he was succeeded by Carl Haglund as Defence Minister as well as the chairman of the party.

On 14 June 2016, Wallin was chosen as the chairman of the Swedish Parliamentary Group, after the previous chair Anna-Maja Henriksson had been elected as the leader of the party. In February 2018, Wallin announced that he wouldn't take part in the 2019 parliamentary election. In April 2019, soon after the parliamentary election, Wallin was announced as the new CEO of Miltton Networks.

== See also ==
- Israel–Finland relations
- Finance scandal of election in 2007 in Finland

Political offices
Preceded by Jan-Erik Enestam	Minister of the Environment; 2007	Succeeded by Paula Lehtomäki
Preceded by Tanja Saarela	Minister for Culture and Sports; 2007—2011	Succeeded by Paavo Arhinmäki
Preceded by Jyri Häkämies	Minister of Defence; 2011—2012	Succeeded by Carl Haglund
