= Seppo Kääriäinen =

Finnish politician (born 1948)

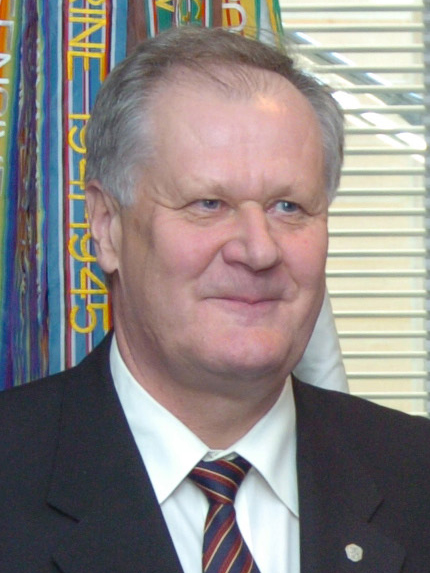
Seppo Kääriäinen.

Seppo Arimo Kääriäinen (born 29 March 1948 in Iisalmen maalaiskunta) is a Finnish politician of the Centre Party and Doctor in Social Sciences. He served as the Minister of Defence of Finland between from 24 June 2003 to 19 April 2007. He has been MP since 1987 and was Minister of Trade and Industry and Minister at the Ministry of Foreign Affairs in 1993–1995. He also served as the First Deputy Speaker of the Parliament of Finland.

Political offices
Preceded by Matti Vanhanen	Minister of Defence (Finland); 2003-2007	Succeeded by Jyri Häkämies
