= Jan-Erik Enestam =

Finnish politician (born 1947)

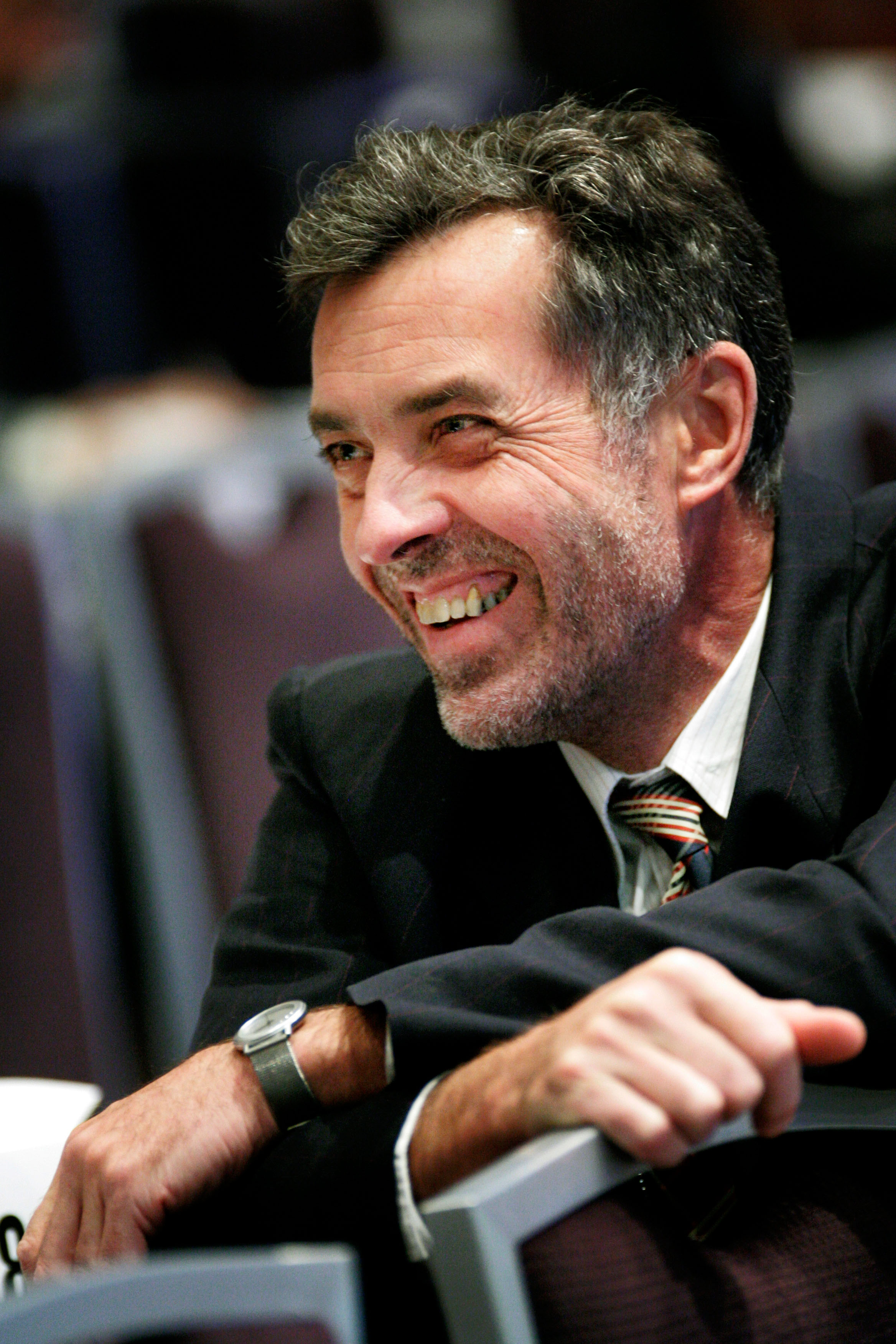
- Enestam in 2005.

Minister of the Environment
- In office 17 April 2003 – 31 December 2006
- Prime Minister: Matti Vanhanen
- Preceded by: Jouni Backman
- Succeeded by: Stefan Wallin

Minister of Defence
- In office 15 April 1999 – 17 April 2003
- Prime Minister: Paavo Lipponen
- Preceded by: Anneli Taina
- Succeeded by: Matti Vanhanen

Leader of the Swedish People’s Party
- In office 1998–2006
- Preceded by: Ole Norrback
- Succeeded by: Stefan Wallin

Member of the Parliament of Finland
- In office 22 March 1991 – 20 March 2007

Personal details
- Born: 12 March 1947 (age 79) Västanfjärd, Finland
- Party: Swedish People’s Party
- Spouse: Solveig Dahlqvist
- Children: 3
- Education: Åbo Akademi University
- Occupation: Politician

Jan-Erik Enestam (born 12 March 1947 in Västanfjärd) is a Finnish politician from the Swedish People's Party. He served as Minister of Defence from 1999 to 2003 under Prime Minister Paavo Lipponen and Minister of the Environment under Prime Ministers Anneli Jäätteenmäki and Matti Vanhanen from 2003 to 2006.

Enestam was the Municipal Director of Västanfjärd between 1978 and 1983 and a Project Chief at the Nordic Council of Ministers during the period 1983–1991. He was a member of Finland's parliament, the Eduskunta, from 1991 until 2007 and a member of the government between 1995 and 2006 in various posts.

He led the Swedish People's Party from 1998 until 2006. He was succeeded by Stefan Wallin as leader at the beginning of 2007.

== Career ==
Some previous posts he has held are:

- Government of Åland, Head of Office, 1974–1978
- Municipality of Västanfjärd, Municipal Manager, 1978–1983
- Nordic Council of Ministers, Project Manager for Archipelago Cooperation, 1983–1991
- Municipal Council of Västänfjärd, Chairperson, 1989–1996
- Special Adviser to the Minister of Defence, 1990–1991
- Member of Parliament, 1991 onwards
- Minister of Defence, from 2 January 1995 to 13 April 1995
- Minister at the Ministry of Social Affairs and Health (equality affairs), from 2 January 1995 to 13 April 1995
- Minister of the Interior, from 13 April 1995 to 15 April 1999
- Party leader of the Swedish People's Party, 1998–2006
- Minister of Defence, from 15 April 1999 to 17 April 2003
- Minister at the Ministry for Foreign Affairs (Nordic cooperation and cooperation with the neighbouring regions), from 15 April 1999 to 17 April 2003
- Minister of Environment from 17 April 2003 to 1 January 2007
- Director of the Secretariat of the Nordic council from 1 August 2007 – 2013

== Personal life ==
Enestam earned a degree from the Åbo Akademi University in Turku.

He was married to Solveig V. Dahlqvist in 1979 and has three children.

Political offices
Preceded by Anneli Taina	Finnish Minister of Defence; 1999–2003	Succeeded by Matti Vanhanen
Preceded by Jouni Backman	Finnish Minister of the Environment; 2003–2007	Succeeded by Stefan Wallin
Party political offices
Preceded by Ole Norrback	Leader of the Swedish People's Party; 1998–2006	Succeeded by Stefan Wallin
Diplomatic posts
Preceded by Frida Nokken	Secretary-General of the Nordic Council; 2007–2013	Succeeded by Britt Bohlin
