= Liisa Hyssälä =

Finnish politician (born 1948)

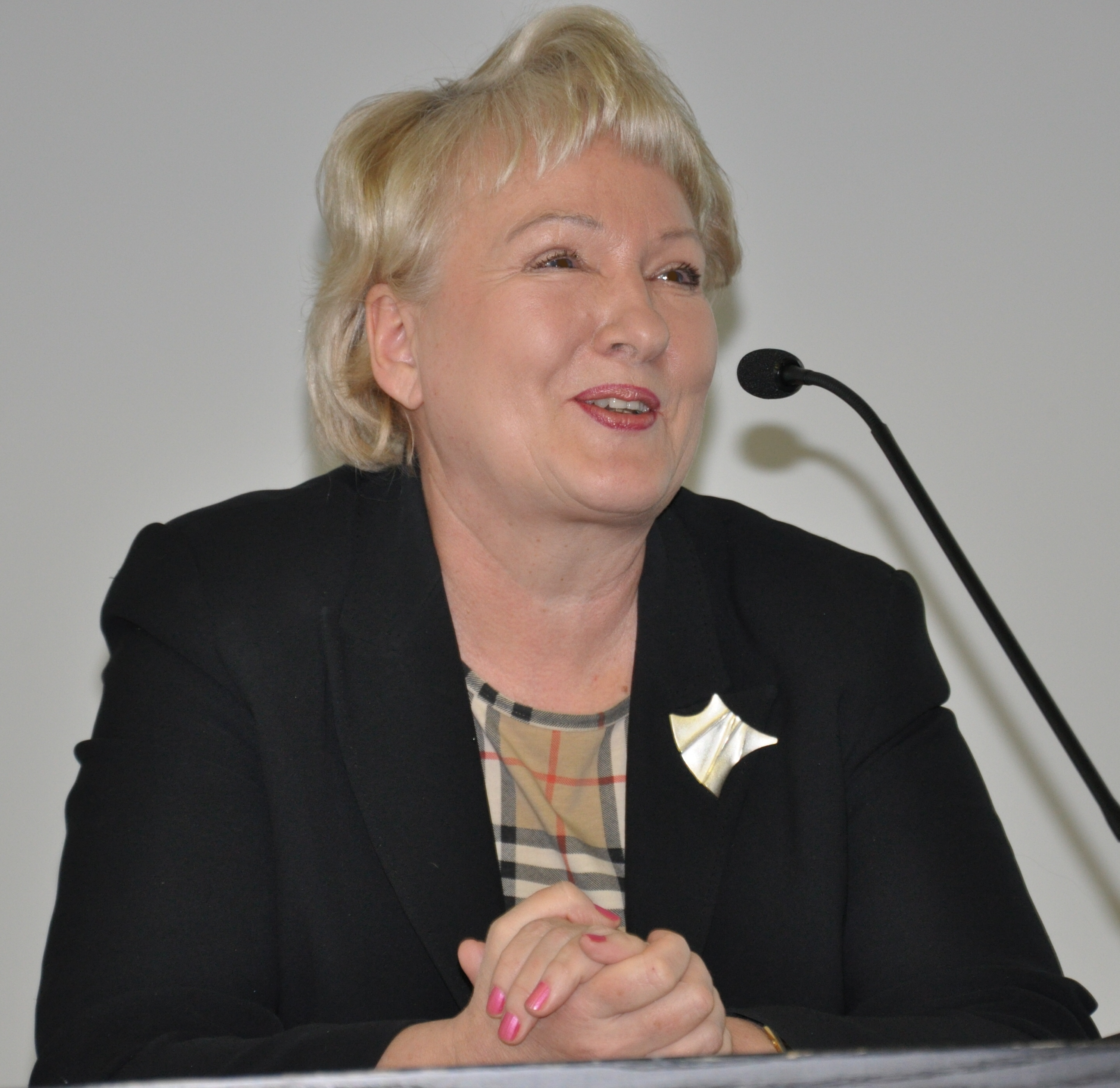
Liisa Hyssälä (2009)

Liisa Marja Hyssälä (born 18 December 1948 in Ii) is a retired Finnish politician of the Centre Party. She was a member of the Parliament of Finland from 1995 to 2010 and the minister of social affairs and health from 2003 to 2010. She was the General Director of Kela from 2010 to 2016.

Preceded by Maija Perho	Minister of Social Affairs and Health (Finland); 2003–2010	Succeeded by Juha Rehula
