= Paula Lehtomäki =

Finnish politician (born 1972)

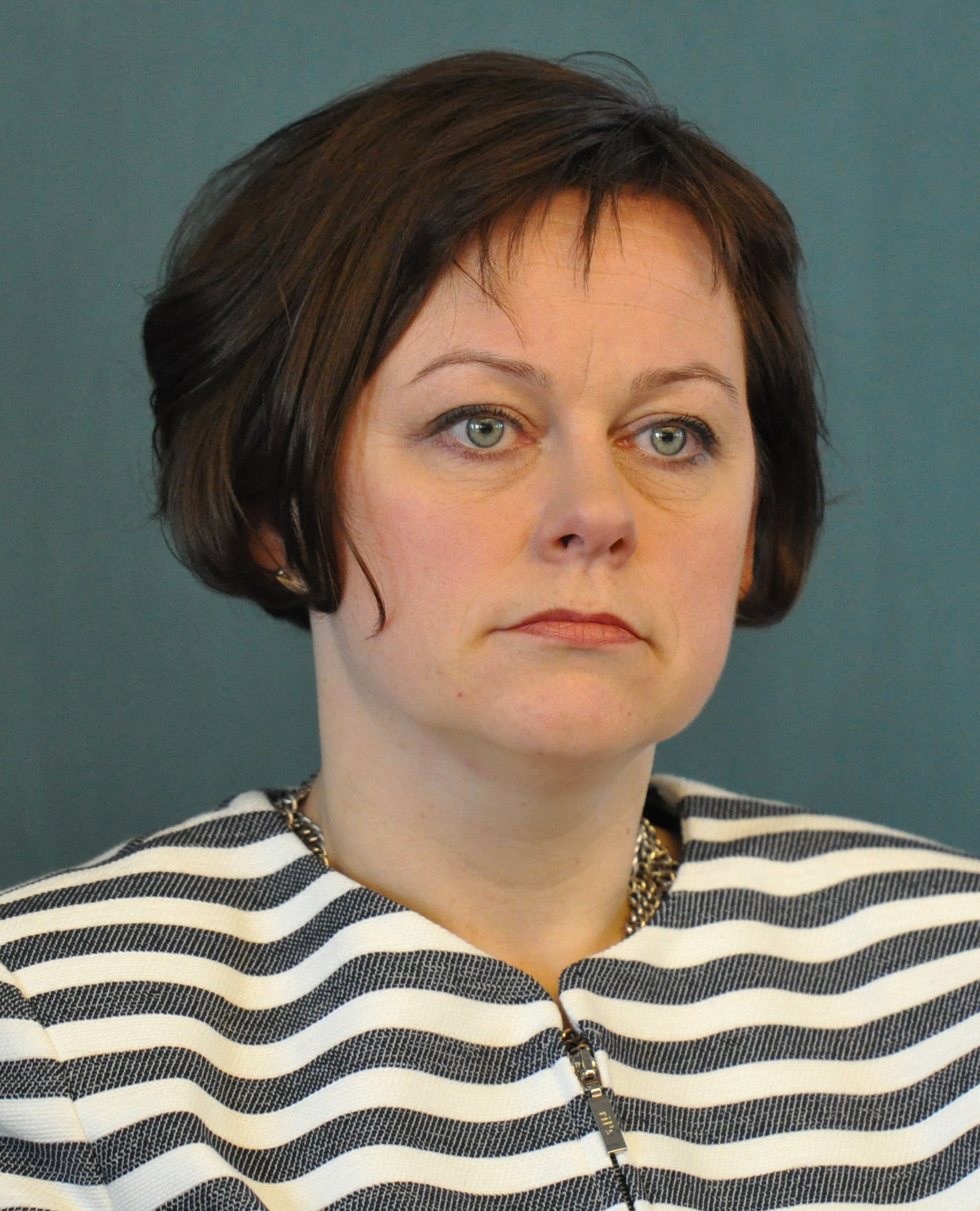
- Paula Lehtomäki in 2015.

Secretary General of the Nordic Council of Ministers
- In office 18 March 2019 – 1 January 2023
- Preceded by: Dagfinn Høybråten
- Succeeded by: Karen Ellemann

Minister for Environment
- In office 19 April 2007 – 22 June 2011
- Prime Minister: Matti Vanhanen; Mari Kiviniemi
- Preceded by: Stefan Wallin
- Succeeded by: Ville Niinistö

Minister for Foreign Trade and Development
- In office 17 April 2003 – 19 April 2007
- Prime Minister: Anneli Jäätteenmäki; Matti Vanhanen
- Preceded by: Jari Vilén
- Succeeded by: Paavo Väyrynen

Personal details
- Born: 29 November 1972 (age 53) Kuhmo, Finland
- Party: Centre Party
- Spouse: Jyri Sahlsten

Paula Lehtomäki (born 29 November 1972 in Kuhmo, Finland) is a Finnish politician. She started her political career in 1996, when she was elected to the Kuhmo town council. In 1999 she was elected to the Finnish Parliament, and again in 2003. In 2002, she was elected as the vice-chairman of Keskusta. In April 2004, she was chosen as the Minister for Foreign Trade and Development, making her the youngest minister in Matti Vanhanen's first cabinet.

She is married and the mother of three children. Her hobbies include cross country skiing, cycling, Nordic walking, badminton, and karaoke.

On 17 April 2007 it was announced that she would be the Minister for Environment in Matti Vanhanen's second cabinet. At the same time it was also announced that she is pregnant, and would take her second maternity leave from a ministerial post later in 2007.

She was Secretary General of the Nordic Council of Ministers from 2019 - 2022. She is the first woman to hold the position, as well as the first person under 50. In her free time she sometimes sings in a band called Punatähdet, which means Red Star.

== See also ==
- Finance scandal of election in 2007 in Finland

Preceded by Stefan Wallin	Minister of Environment; 2007–2011	Succeeded by Ville Niinistö
