= Matti Vanhanen =

Prime Minister of Finland from 2003 to 2010 (born 1955)

Valtioneuvos Matti Vanhanen
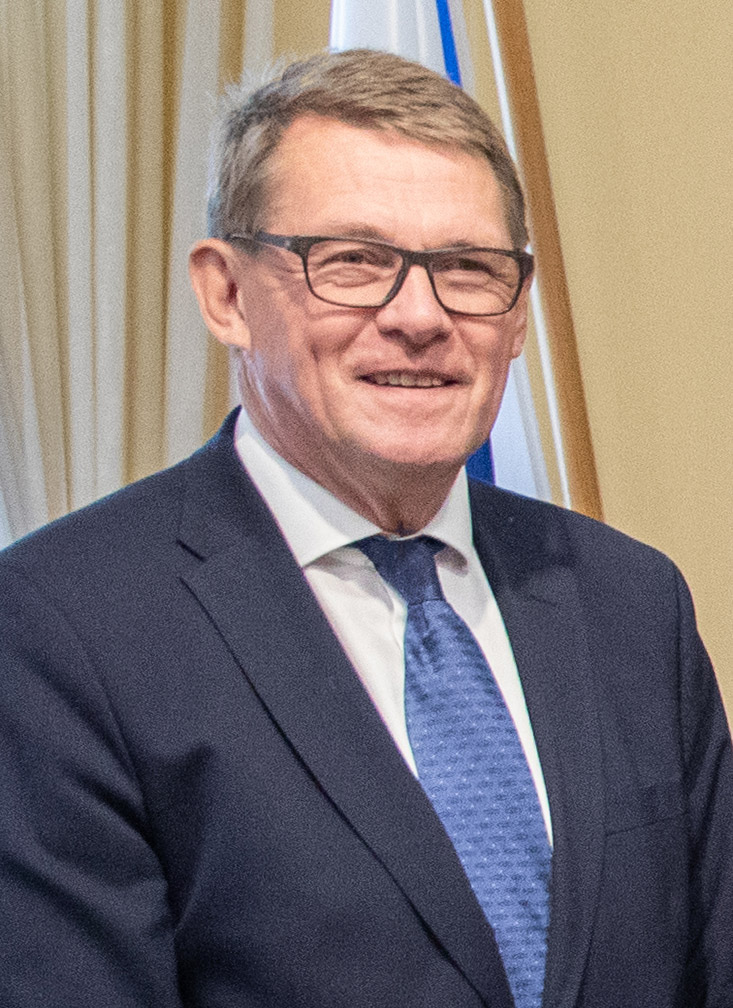
- Vanhanen in 2022

Speaker of the Parliament of Finland
- In office 1 February 2022 – 12 April 2023
- Preceded by: Anu Vehviläinen
- Succeeded by: Petteri Orpo
- In office 7 June 2019 – 9 June 2020
- Preceded by: Antti Rinne
- Succeeded by: Anu Vehviläinen

40th Prime Minister of Finland
- In office 24 June 2003 – 22 June 2010
- President: Tarja Halonen
- Deputy: Antti Kalliomäki; Eero Heinäluoma; Jyrki Katainen
- Preceded by: Anneli Jäätteenmäki
- Succeeded by: Mari Kiviniemi

Minister of Finance
- In office 9 June 2020 – 27 May 2021
- Prime Minister: Sanna Marin
- Preceded by: Katri Kulmuni
- Succeeded by: Annika Saarikko

35th Deputy Prime Minister of Finland
- In office 9 June 2020 – 10 September 2020
- Prime Minister: Sanna Marin
- Preceded by: Katri Kulmuni
- Succeeded by: Annika Saarikko

Minister of Defence
- In office 17 April 2003 – 24 June 2003
- Prime Minister: Anneli Jäätteenmäki
- Preceded by: Jan-Erik Enestam
- Succeeded by: Seppo Kääriäinen

Member of the Finnish Parliament
- In office 22 April 2015 – 12 April 2023
- Constituency: Uusimaa
- In office 22 March 1991 – 19 September 2010
- Constituency: Uusimaa

Personal details
- Born: 4 November 1955 (age 70) Jyväskylä, Central Finland, Finland
- Party: Centre
- Spouse: Merja Mäntyniemi (m. 1985; div. 2005)
- Children: 2
- Education: University of Helsinki

Military service
- Allegiance: Finland
- Branch/service: Finnish Army
- Rank: Vääpeli

Matti Taneli Vanhanen (Note: Finnish pronunciation: [ˈmɑtːi ˈʋɑnhɑnen]) (born 4 November 1955) is a Finnish politician who served as Prime Minister of Finland from 2003 to 2010 and then as the Speaker of Parliament from 2022 to 2023. He was also Chairman of the Centre Party from 2006 until 2010 and the party's presidential candidate in 2006 and 2018. Outside of that, he has served under multiple ministerial positions throughout his 27 years as a member of the Finnish parliament, with those being Finance Minister, Deputy Prime Minister and Defence Minister.

In his earlier career, he was a journalist. Vanhanen is the son of professor Tatu Vanhanen and Anni Tiihonen.

== Education ==
Vanhanen studied political science at the University of Helsinki, graduating as a Master of Social Sciences in 1989.

== Career ==
He was chairman of the Centre Party Youth League from 1980 to 1983. He also served as a member of the Espoo City Council from 1981 to 1984. Vanhanen used to work as a journalist. He was an editor (1985–1988) and editor-in-chief (1988–1991) at the local newspaper Kehäsanomat. In a column in Suomenmaa (the Centre Party's organ), he strongly condemned the Baltic Star pro-Estonian independence demonstration held in Helsinki in July 1985, calling the demonstration "provocative".

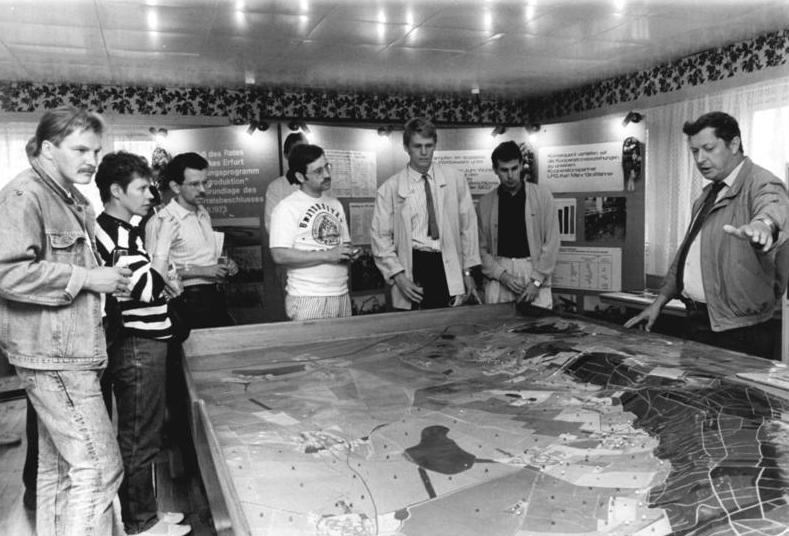
Vanhanen (third from right) visited the GDR in 1988.

Vanhanen was elected to the Finnish Parliament (Eduskunta) in 1991. As a member of Parliament, he was interested in ecological issues. For instance, Vanhanen spoke against the building of a fifth nuclear power plant in 1992, at the same time as serving on the board of electricity corporation Fortum. He served on the Parliamentary Environment Committee 1991–1995 and was chair of the Parliamentary Grand Committee 2000–2001. He was vice-chair of the Centre Party Parliamentary group 1994–2001 and Deputy Chairman of the Centre Party 2000–2003.

Another important topic for Vanhanen was Finland's foreign and security policy. As a specialist on the European Union, he was a member of the European Union Constitutional Convention. There, he criticised the president of the convention, former French president Valéry Giscard d'Estaing, as authoritarian. Vanhanen has said that he is unenthusiastic about European co-operation, and that he is an "EU pragmatist", so he may be considered a eurosceptic, especially when compared to his EU-enthusiast predecessor Paavo Lipponen.

Vanhanen served as Chairman of the Youth Foundation from 1998 to 2003 and deputy chairman from 1981 to 1997. The prosecution claims the Youth Foundation donated, under the direction of Centre Party MP Antti Kaikkonen, funding of over 90,000 euros for his own campaign and that of other Centre Party MPs, including Matti Vanhanen. Prosecutors say this contravened the Foundation's own rules and laws governing such institutions.

=== Vanhanen's first cabinet ===
Vanhanen resigned from the Constitutional Convention in 2003 when he became Minister of Defence in the cabinet of Prime Minister Anneli Jäätteenmäki. After Jäätteenmäki's resignation, Vanhanen was elected Prime Minister and his first cabinet was formed.

As a politician, Vanhanen is considered to be part of the liberal wing of the old agrarian Central Party, along with the two other Party ministers from Uusimaa region. His government cut the top state income tax rate from 35.5% to 33.5% in 2005 and 32.5% in 2006 (resulting in approximately a 55% total tax rate after local government and social security taxes). The corporate tax rate was also lowered to 26% and capital gains to 28% (both formerly 29%), though at the same time, dividends were partially made taxable.

=== Presidential candidate ===
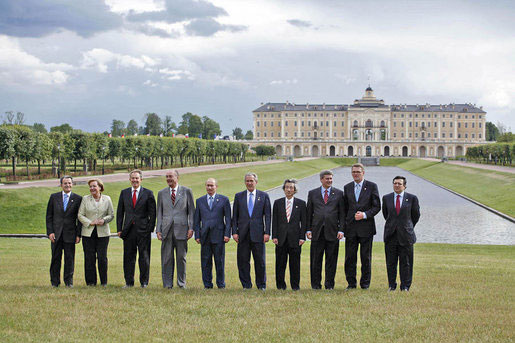
Vanhanen after Finnish 2006 presidential elections in G8 Summit in Strelna, Russia. Left to right: Romano Prodi, Angela Merkel, Tony Blair, Jacques Chirac, Vladimir Putin, George W. Bush, Junichiro Koizumi, Stephen Harper, Matti Vanhanen and José Manuel Barroso.

As the Centre Party candidate, Vanhanen challenged President Tarja Halonen in the 2006 Finnish presidential election. He received 18.6% of the vote, coming third to the National Coalition Party's Sauli Niinistö (24.1%) and the Social Democrat and incumbent Tarja Halonen (46.3%), and thus did not qualify for the runoff. Vanhanen expressed his support for Niinistö in the runoff election against his coalition partner's candidate, Halonen.

The presidential election and co-operation between the Centre Party and the National Coalition Party proved to be a major strain on the government coalition between the Centre Party and the Social Democrats. The flashpoint came in March, when the Centre Party demanded national agricultural subsidies to cover farmers' losses when the Finnish exception in the European Union's Common Agricultural Policy was about to expire. At the end of the crisis, Vanhanen told his parliamentary group that taxpayers would cover ninety per cent or about 100 million euros, in losses.

Matti Vanhanen received 25,000 euros for his presidential election campaign in 2006 from Ahti Vilppula via his company Helsingin Mekaanikkotalo. Mekaanikkotalo is owned by Procomex in Luxembourg and further by Kilbrin Investments Limited in the Virgin Islands. In 2009, it was found out that this finance was not included in the finance announcement.

=== Vanhanen's second cabinet ===
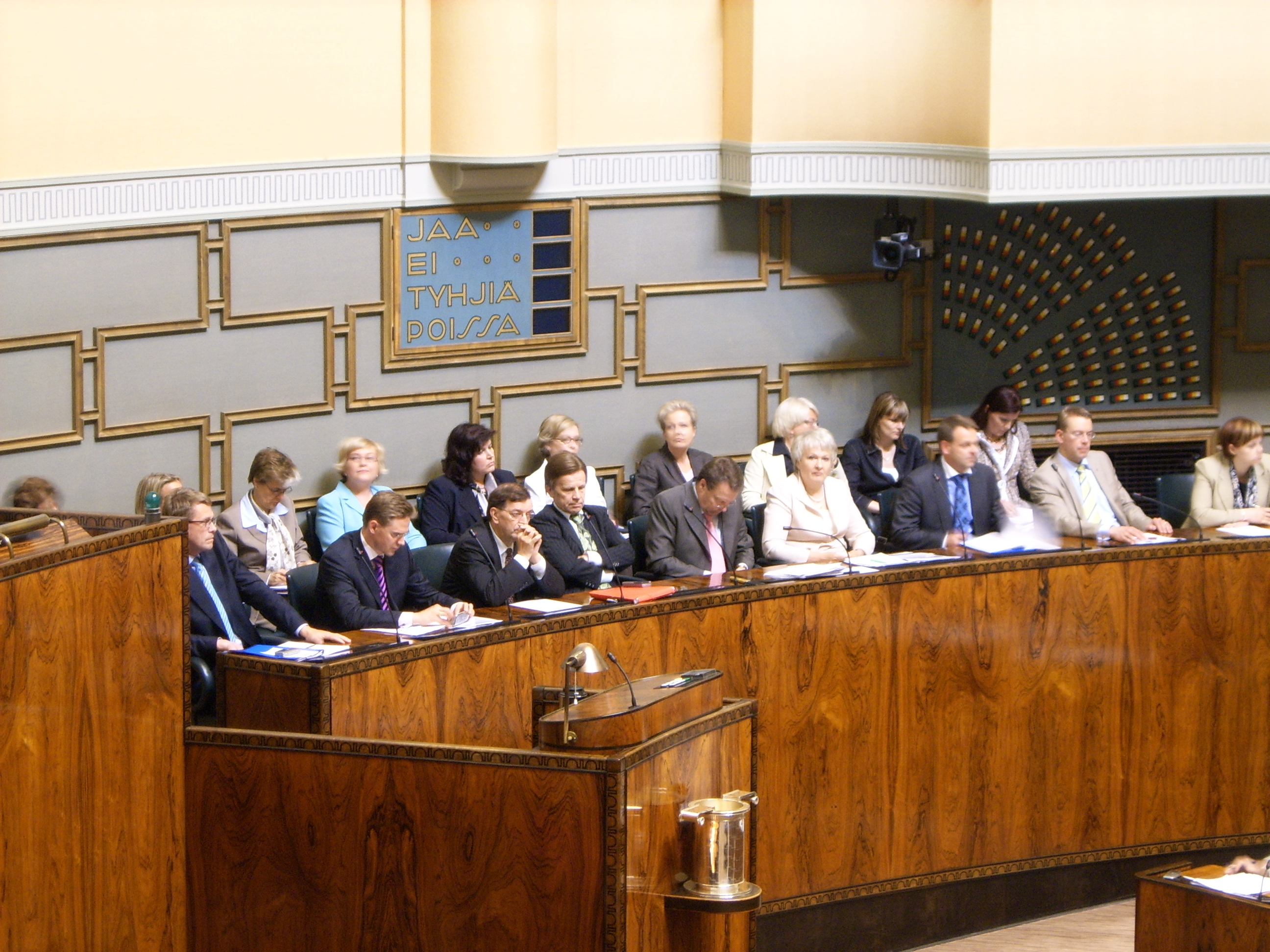
Vanhanen's second cabinet.

After the March 2007 election, the Centre Party narrowly remained the largest party after losing four seats. However, their coalition partner, the SDP, lost eight seats and the centre-right National Coalition Party gained ten. Vanhanen's second cabinet was formed on a centre-right basis, with minor partners the Green League and the Swedish People's Party.

A scandal involving Vanhanen's second cabinet began rolling in May 2008, after the leader of the Centre Party's parliamentary group, Timo Kalli, said publicly that he would not reveal information about his campaign finances, because such disclosure was not required. After a media backlash, Kalli gave up his secrecy and listed a group of businessmen known as "Kehittyvien maakuntien Suomi" (KMS; in English, "The Finland of Developing Regions"), who had financed the Centre Party. Centre Party links with KMS were suspected, as one address of the organisation belonged to a party official. It was later revealed that the organisation had been formed in the Centre Party's general secretary's office.

After the Russian response to the Georgian invasion of South Ossetia, Vanhanen said that Finland would rethink its security.

Vanhanen's cabinet proposed raising the retirement age from 63 to 65 years. His proposal was fiercely opposed by the Central Organisation of Finnish Trade Unions (Finnish acronym SAK), which is affiliated with the SDP.

In December 2009, Vanhanen announced that he would step down as chair of the Centre Party at its June 2010 convention. Mari Kiviniemi was chosen for the position, and she also inherited the position as prime minister. In September 2010, Vanhanen started as the head of the Family Business Network Finland and left the parliament.

In 2010, the Finnish police investigated whether Vanhanen had been wrong not to disqualify himself in certain cabinet decisions on financial contributions to an organisation affiliated with the Centre Party, which had previously financed Vanhanen's presidential campaign. Because the charges concerned Vanhanen's actions while in office, the decision whether he should be prosecuted fell to the Constitutional Law Committee of the Finnish Parliament. The Committee decided not to prosecute Vanhanen.

=== Return to politics ===
In November 2014, Vanhanen announced that he would leave the Family Business Network. He was elected to the parliament in the 2015 elections with 11,304 personal votes. In June 2015, Vanhanen was chosen as the chairman of the Centre Party parliamentary group.

In March 2016, Vanhanen announced that he was seeking the Centre Party's candidacy in the 2018 presidential election. As no challengers appeared within the party, Vanhanen was the sole candidate in June's party conference and was confirmed as the Centre Party's candidate in the presidential election. Vanhanen said that his candidacy is motivated by the support he felt he had around the country during his last campaign and the will to improve the security situation in the areas surrounding Finland. Following the nomination, Vanhanen left his duties as the chairman of the parliamentary group in order to focus on global affairs. On 23 June 2016, Vanhanen was chosen as the chairman of the Foreign Affairs Committee in the Parliament. In the first round of the presidential election, Vanhanen placed fifth with 4.1 per cent of the votes, while the incumbent president Sauli Niinistö went on to secure his second term with a majority of votes.

After getting re-elected in 2019 parliamentary election, Vanhanen was elected as the Speaker of the Parliament.

In June 2020, after Katri Kulmuni's resignation, Vanhanen was appointed Minister of Finance. Though he initially didn't want to accept the offer, he changed his mind and accepted out of a sense of duty. In May 2021 Vanhanen announced his resignation from the post to hand it over to party chair Annika Saarikko.

In 2016, Vanhanen said that Finland's membership in NATO was a true option. In 2022, Vanhanen supported Finland's membership in NATO. In 2023, as the Speaker of the Parliament of Finland he signed the parliament's approval to join the military alliance.

== Personality ==
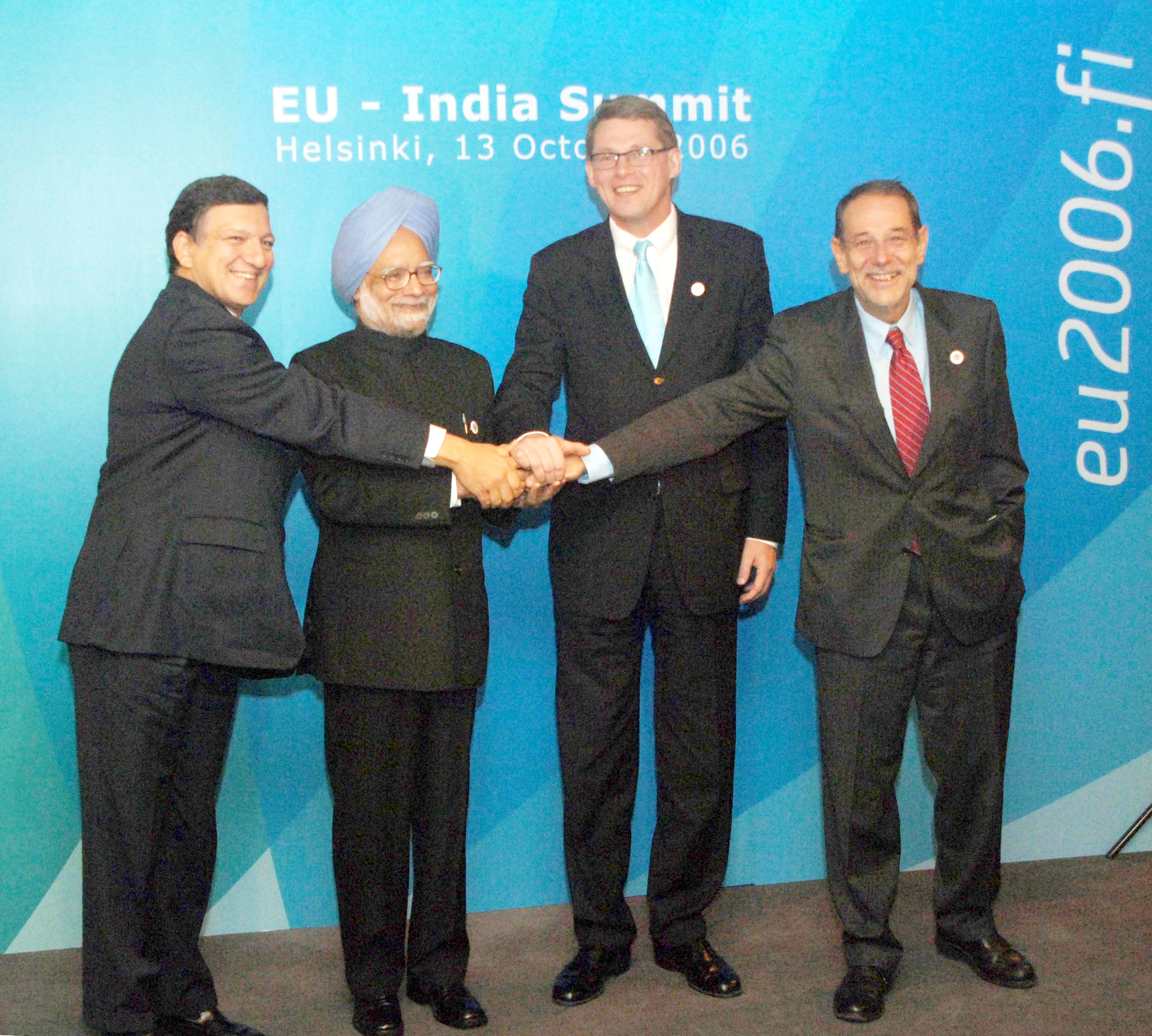
Vanhanen meeting with European Commission President José Manuel Barroso, Indian Prime Minister Manmohan Singh and High Representative of the European Union for Foreign Affairs and Security Policy Javier Solana, EU–India Summit in Helsinki on 13 October 2006

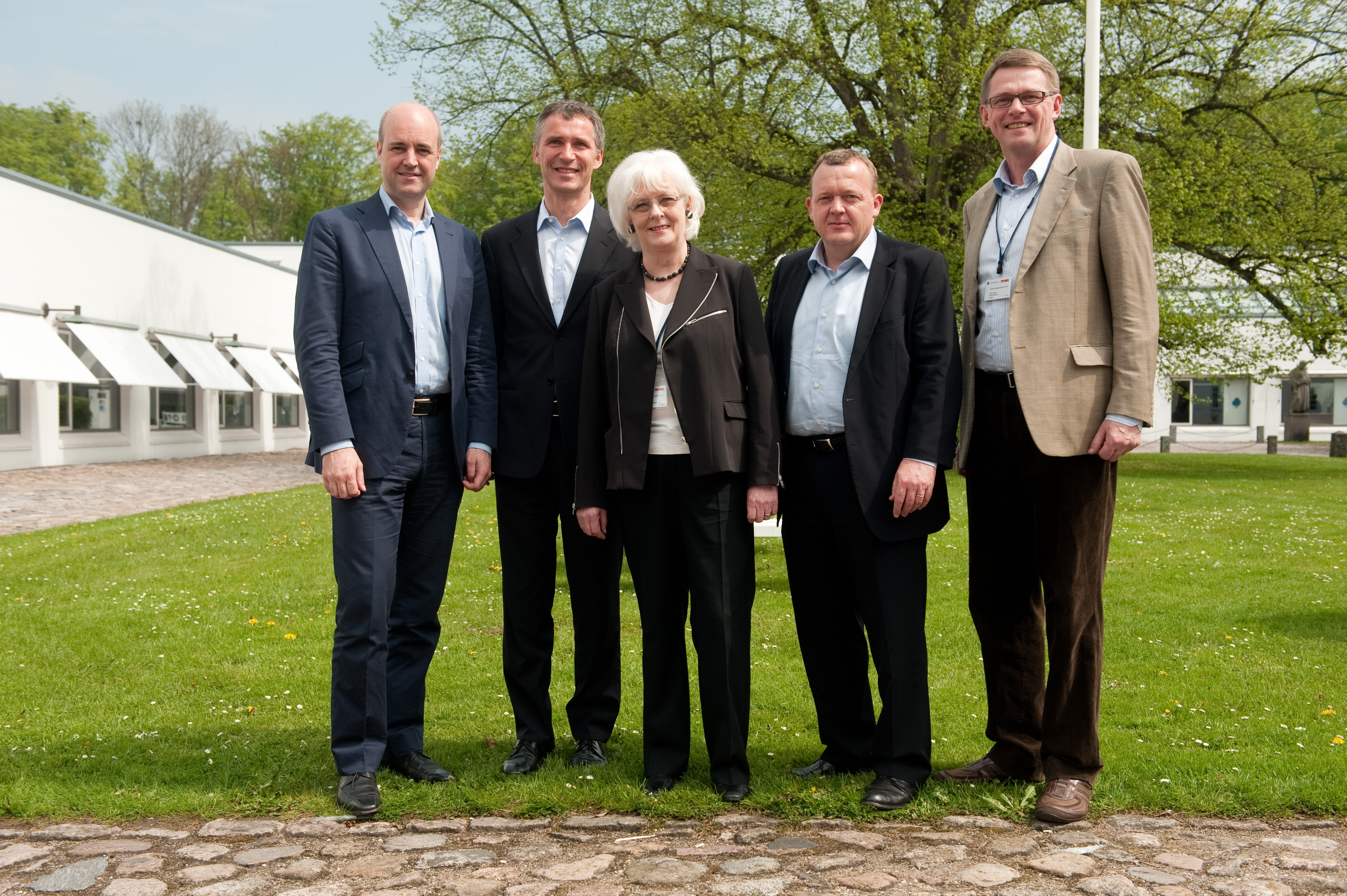
The Nordic prime ministers meeting in Denmark, 2010. From left to right: Fredrik Reinfeldt (Sweden), Jens Stoltenberg (Norway), Jóhanna Sigurðardóttir (Iceland), Lars Løkke Rasmussen (Denmark), Matti Vanhanen (Finland).

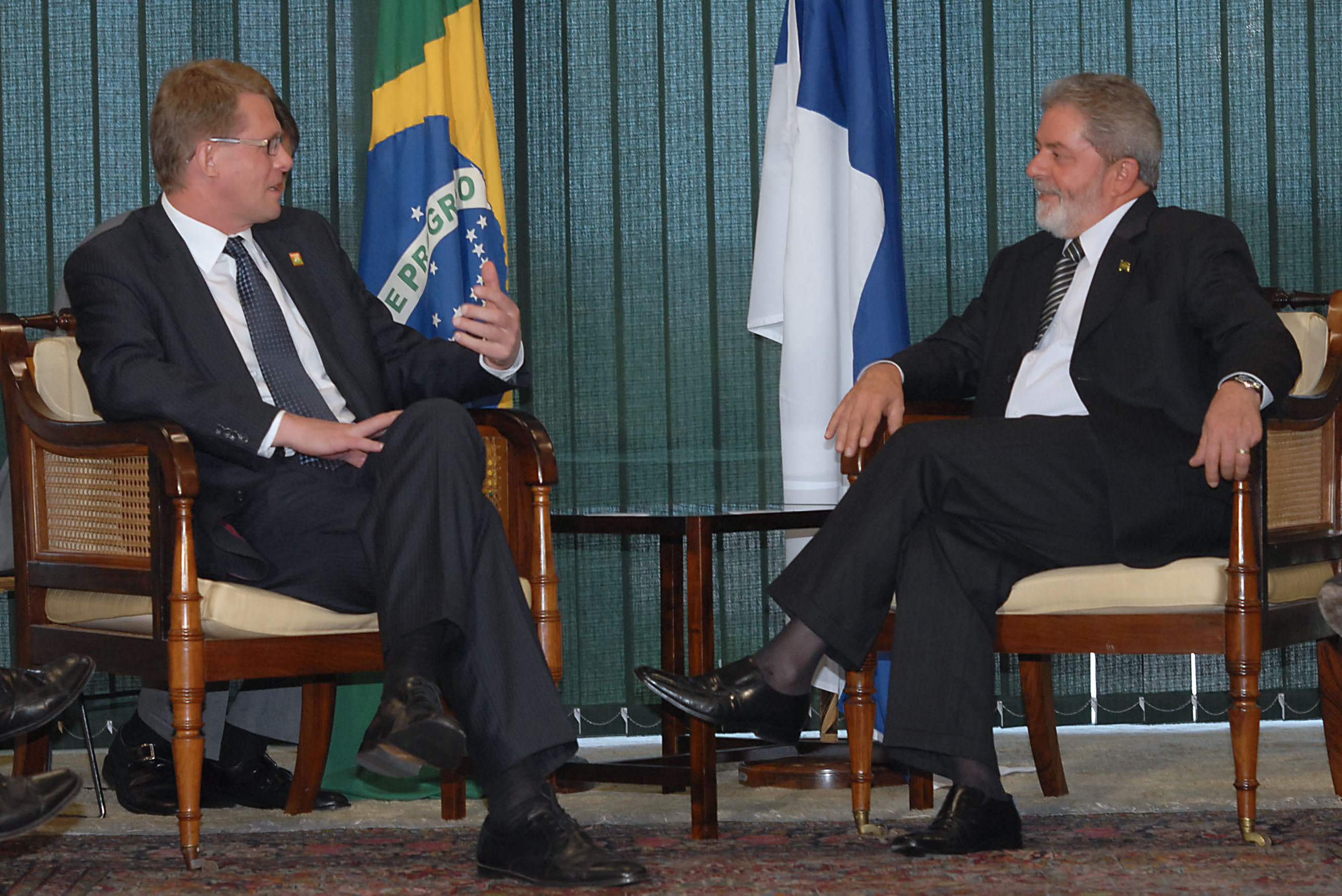
Vanhanen and the 35th President of Brazil Luiz Inácio Lula da Silva.

Vanhanen has been characterised as uncharismatic and even boring, which he has attempted to turn to his advantage in tense political situations. Vanhanen is known for being a teetotaler, saying that he does not like the taste of alcohol.

Matti Vanhanen was against the independence movement in the Baltic States during the 1980s. In his column in Suomenmaa in 1985, Vanhanen condemned the Baltic independence movement both for "wishing to change the Soviet system" and for "indifference towards the post Second World War reality." Vanhanen claimed that the difference between capitalism and socialism was not significant, and that instead of being concerned about the Soviet system, it would be better to concentrate, for example, on the research of Finno-Ugric languages.

In 2009, he visited China and credited the government for being systematic, as well as being able to place clear priorities and to mobilise the required resources to accomplish them. In his opinion, the Western world ought to note the example of China, where policies are implemented rapidly and effectively. He said he was impressed by the progress the country has made in dealing with difficult issues.

Vanhanen married Merja Vanhanen in 1985. They have two children: Annastiina (born 1991) and Juhana (born 1994). Matti Vanhanen and Merja Vanhanen unexpectedly announced their divorce on 6 April 2005.

After his divorce, he dated Susan Kuronen (she later changed her last name to Ruusunen). In February 2007, Kuronen released a tell-all book The Prime Minister's Bride, which actually boosted the prime minister's popularity with the public. Tens of thousands of Finns signed an online petition against the book, and some bookstores refused to put it on the shelf. Vanhanen sued the book's publisher (but not Kuronen) for invasion of privacy in March 2007, following the March elections. In 2010 the Supreme Court of Finland upheld the privacy violation conviction against Susan Ruusunen and her publisher.

After ending his dating relationship with Kuronen (Ruusunen), Vanhanen got engaged to Sirkka Mertala in 2009. This relationship ended in 2010.

In a 2006 book commissioned for the presidential elections, Se on ihan Matti, Vanhanen compared the Finnish tabloid press to the KGB and Stasi, former Soviet Union and East German secret police agencies.

Vanhanen has two homes; he lives permanently in Lepsämä, a rural village in the Nurmijärvi municipality, but on weekends in the town of Rauma.

Vanhanen is about 198 centimetres (6 feet 6 inches). He is left-handed.

== Cabinets ==
- Vanhanen I Cabinet
- Vanhanen II Cabinet

== Honours ==
- Finland Order of the Lion of Finland (1999)
- Finland, Grand Cross, Order of the White Rose of Finland (2004)
- Estonia, 1st Class, Order of the Cross of Terra Mariana (2007)
- Italy, Knight Grand Cross with Collar, Order of Merit of the Italian Republic (2008)
- Sweden, Commander Grand Cross, Order of the Polar Star
- Greece, Grand Cross, Order of the Phoenix (Greece)

== See also ==
- Keskusta

== Notes ==
Political offices
Preceded by Jan-Erik Enestam	Minister of Defence; 2003	Succeeded by Seppo Kääriäinen
Preceded by Anneli Jäätteenmäki	Prime Minister of Finland; 2003–2010	Succeeded by Mari Kiviniemi
Preceded by Antti Rinne	Speaker of the Parliament of Finland; 2019–2020	Succeeded by Anu Vehviläinen
Preceded by Katri Kulmuni	Deputy Prime Minister of Finland; 2020	Succeeded by Annika Saarikko
Preceded by Katri Kulmuni	Minister of Finance; 2020–2021	Succeeded by Annika Saarikko
Preceded by Anu Vehviläinen	Speaker of the Parliament of Finland; 2022–2023	Succeeded by Petteri Orpo
Party political offices
Preceded by Anneli Jäätteenmäki	Leader of the Centre Party; 2003–2010	Succeeded by Mari Kiviniemi
Diplomatic posts
Preceded by Wolfgang Schüssel	President of the European Council; 2006	Succeeded by Angela Merkel
