= Ahtium =

Finnish mining company

Coordinates: 63°58′30″N 28°00′30″E

- Type: Public
- Traded as: LSE: TALV
- Predecessor: Talvivaara Mining Company
- Founded: 2004; 22 years ago
- Defunct: 2018
- Fate: Filed for bankruptcy on 6 March 2018
- Headquarters: Espoo; Finland
- Key people: Tapani Järvinen (chairman); Pekka Perä (CEO)
- Revenue: €231.2 million (2011)
- Operating income: €30.9 million (2011)
- Net income: €(5.2) million (2011)
- Website: www.ahtium.com

Ahtium (known until 2017 as the Talvivaara Mining Company; Finnish: Talvivaaran Kaivososakeyhtiö Oyj) was a Finnish mining company that operated the Talvivaara nickel mine from the company's establishment in 2004 until the mining business was sold to the state-owned Terrafame in 2015.

Formerly listed on the London and Helsinki Stock Exchanges, the company was a constituent of the OMXH25 index. Its mining business, Talvivaara Sotkamo, went bankrupt in November 2014, and it is bound for liquidation, with at least 98% of equity lost, and €1.4 million debt outstanding. The mine had suffered several leaks of toxic metal-contaminated tailings, which had threatened local waterways. Members of the management were charged with criminal environmental offenses. There has been considerable government involvement, with the Government of Finland being the largest single owner through their investment company Solidium. In 2015, the newly established government-owned corporation Terrafame bought the mining business of Talvivaara. Since February 2017 Terrafame, operating the Talvivaara Mine, have new owners from Singapore Trafigura and its Galena Asset Management.

Ahtium filed for bankruptcy in March 2018.

== History ==
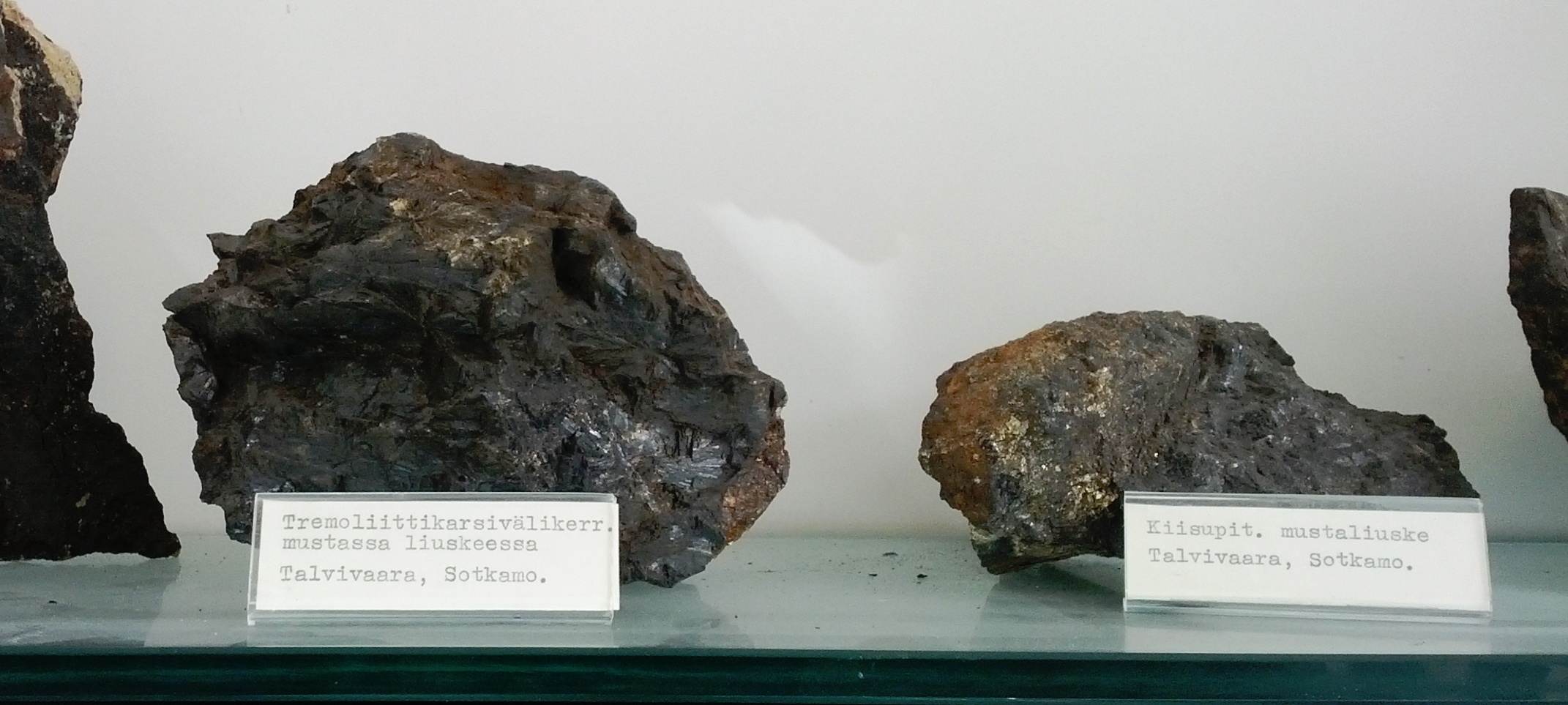
Iron-nickel sulfide-bearing black schist ore samples from Talvivaara.

The deposits, Kuusilampi and Kolmisoppi, were originally discovered in 1977, by the Geological Survey of Finland (GTK). Although the deposit was large, it was considered too poor for existing technology. Only bioheap leaching could concentrate the nickel enough, but the technology was still untested. The mining rights were eventually obtained by Outokumpu Corporation, which sold them at a nominal price of two euros to a former employee, Pekka Perä. The Talvivaara Mining Company was established in 2004 when it acquired the rights to mine sites at Sotkamo in Eastern Finland from Outokumpu. In 2006 a metals recovery trial was completed and the necessary financing was secured. Perä proceeded to list the company on the London Stock Exchange in 2007 and later on the Helsinki Stock Exchange in 2009. The firm was delisted from the London Stock Exchange in 2014, this was to reduce costs according to information on their website.

The appropriate permits to commence mining were obtained in 2007 and metals production started late in 2008. The construction of the mine cost 560 million euros in 2007–2008, and an additional 22 million from HEX in 2009 enabled investments that increased production by 45%.

In 2010 the company announced the commencement of uranium production as a by-product from its normal mining operations in Sotkamo. The uranium produced will be in the form of yellowcake with an estimated annual production of approximately 350 tons. At a yellowcake price of $40/lb the uranium production could result in an additional €20m annual revenue. The capital investment costs were €30m and estimated annual production costs are €2m. The resulting uranium production is estimated to meet 80% of Finland's annual uranium demand, although reprocessing and enrichment would be required to be conducted abroad, and would effectively double the production of uranium in the EU. Currently, the uranium is deposited into the gypsum pond.

== Government involvement ==
The Government of Finland owns 8.89% of Talvivaara, and additionally, the pension funds Ilmarinen, Varma and Keva (the public sector pension fund) own stock. The Minister of Economic Affairs is responsible for management of the stock. The previous minister, Jyri Häkämies (NCP), resigned in 2012 and was appointed as the new CEO of Confederation of Finnish Industries. The government supported the mine project by building 60 million euros worth of infrastructure.

In the Talvivaara startup were present three ministers of Centre Party of Finland: Minister of Environment Paula Lehtomäki 2007-2011, Minister of Trade and Industry Mauri Pekkarinen and Prime Minister Matti Vanhanen. The family of Paula Lehtomäki (mother, husband and two underaged children) acquired Talvivaara stock a few weeks before the announcement of uranium production plans. Minister Lehtomäki's husband owned €270,000 worth of Talvivaara stock. The director of the Kainuu environmental office was appointed by Minister Lehtomäki in 2007.

=== Finnish state ownership ===
Solidium is 100% Finnish state owned unit that controls 11 state owned stock companies. According to Solidium in November 2012 the state ownership in Talvivaara was 8,9 % with value of €31 million. In April 2013 state invested €47 million more. The state ownership is 16.7% with value of €60 million. Finnish state has no members in the Talvivaara board of directors.

== Financials ==
Norilsk Nickel, the world's leading producer of nickel, has made a 10-year contract with Talvivaara Mining Company to purchase the latter's entire output of the nickel and cobalt production at market prices.

The company has suffered poor profitability. In November 2013, metals recovery operations were ceased, and negotiations on a €40 million public offering were terminated as inconclusive. A corporate reorganization claim was filed in the Espoo district court. The company is deeply in debt to Nyrstar, Nordea Bank, Svenska Handelsbanken, Danske Bank, Varma, Cameco, Finnvera (the official export credit agency) and a variety of equipment suppliers and other companies. Nyrstar continued to fund Talvivaara with a €20 million loan, which was strictly conditional on zinc ore deliveries. The official receiver tried to negotiate a financing method for the reorganization, and published the proposal for a company voluntary arrangement at the end of September 2014. According to the report, the mining business in Sotkamo was viable and could be made profitable. Unfortunately, the debt restructuring in the plan required a 97-99% cancellation of the debt, essentially diluting the original stock nearly out of existence, and required €100 million of new funding. However, this new funding could not be secured and Talvivaara Sotkamo filed for bankruptcy on November 6, 2014, and trading of the shares of the parent company, Talvivaara Oyj, was stopped in the Helsinki stock exchange.

Authorities estimate that the cost of needed environmental measures is €100 million with present capacity. If the company does not take action, the government will, regardless of the consent of the company.

== Operations ==
The Talvivaara mine, since 2015 owned and operated by Terrafame, is one of the largest nickel mines in Finland. The mine is located in Sotkamo in Eastern Finland and employs 400 people. It is an open-pit mine, 22 km from Sotkamo and 28 km from Kajaani. The mine consists of two deposits 3 km apart, Kuusilampi and Kolmisoppi, and has an annual production capacity of over 10 million tonnes of ore. The mine has reserves amounting to 1 billion tonnes of ore grading 0.22% nickel, 0.13% copper, 0.5% zinc and 0.02% cobalt thus resulting 2.2 million tonnes of nickel, 1.3 million tonnes of copper, 5 million tonnes of zinc and 0.2 million tonnes of cobalt. 90% of the nickel is deposited in black schist rock, which contains 31% sulfides, most of which consist of iron sulfide minerals. Nickel-bearing sulfide minerals pentlandite, altered pentlandite and pyrrhotite are present in low concentrations, but are accessible by bioheap leaching.

The metals are extracted by bioheap leaching, a method where natural bacteria living in the rock accelerate metal leaching by oxidation. In conventional leaching, a coat of porous sulfide rock is left behind on the shrinking core of nickel in the grain. In contrast, in bioheap leaching, the oxidation of sulfides causes eventual disintegration of the porous rock, exposing more area than achievable by chemical means only. The ground ore is built into heaps 1.2 km long and 400 m wide, and a recycling irrigation system is used to keep the grains wet. The heat produced by the bacterial oxidation keeps the heap warm throughout the year. Extraction is done twice in primary and secondary heaps. In a pilot heap, over 90% of nickel and 80% of zinc was recovered within 500 days of leaching. Cobalt and copper recoveries were lower, 14% and 2%, respectively. The resulting green-colored solution is then refined to the metals. Treatment with hydrogen sulfide precipitates copper sulfide, then zinc sulfide and finally nickel-cobalt sulfide.

In 2011 Cameco signed an agreement with Talvivaara, where Cameco would pay US$60 million to construct a uranium extraction circuit at the mine in Sotkamo. Talvivaara would then pay back the initial construction costs in the form of uranium concentrate; once the initial costs are paid Cameco would continue to purchase the uranium concentrate at a pricing formula based on market price on the day of delivery.

A railway track was built in order to transport the nickel-cobalt concentrate to a Norilsk Nickel smeltery in Harjavalta, Finland.

== Regulation ==
Based on stock exchange regulations according to the Courts of appeal in Finland Pekka Perä gave misleading information about Talvivaara mining production volume in 2012 and 2013. He was fined 240 euros by Courts of appeal in Finland in March 2019. Ahtium Oy (ex Talvivaara Kaivososakeyhtiö) was fined 20 000 euros.

== Environmental impacts ==
Prosecutors were considering a case against Talvivaara Mining in January 2014. Talvivaara had received seven penalty payments on waste water management in June 2014. None of the penalty payments had been convicted to charge yet. In addition to small lakes located nearby the mine, the waste waters have affected many larger and farther away lakes too, i.e. Lake Kivijärvi, Lake Jormasjärvi and Lake Nuasjärvi.

=== Sulfate emissions ===
The operation has caused controversy because of its environmental impacts. Sulfate concentration in the effluent (8000 mg/m^{3}) has exceeded the permitted levels (130 mg/m^{3}), causing severe pollution in the water course. Insufficient mixing caused the formation of an artificial halocline in a lake where effluent was discharged, which led to the lake bottom becoming anoxic. Reduction of sulfate into hydrogen sulfide by bacteria caused odour problems. Also, dust emissions were reported, but the prosecutor declined to press charges after a police investigation was completed.

MEPs Sirpa Pietikäinen and Satu Hassi initiated a European Commission investigation in June 2012 into Talvivaara's compliance with EU directives on mining waste. Both said that environmental officials have not efficiently taken issue with the violations, and have thereby violated Finland's EU obligations. Minister of the Environment Ville Niinistö indicated that the state may intervene with the operations unless the environmental impacts are brought under control. The Government of Finland responded in October 2012 with the conclusion that the local state authority, the Kainuu ELY Centre, has adequately monitored Talvivaara's operations.

=== Gypsum pond leak ===
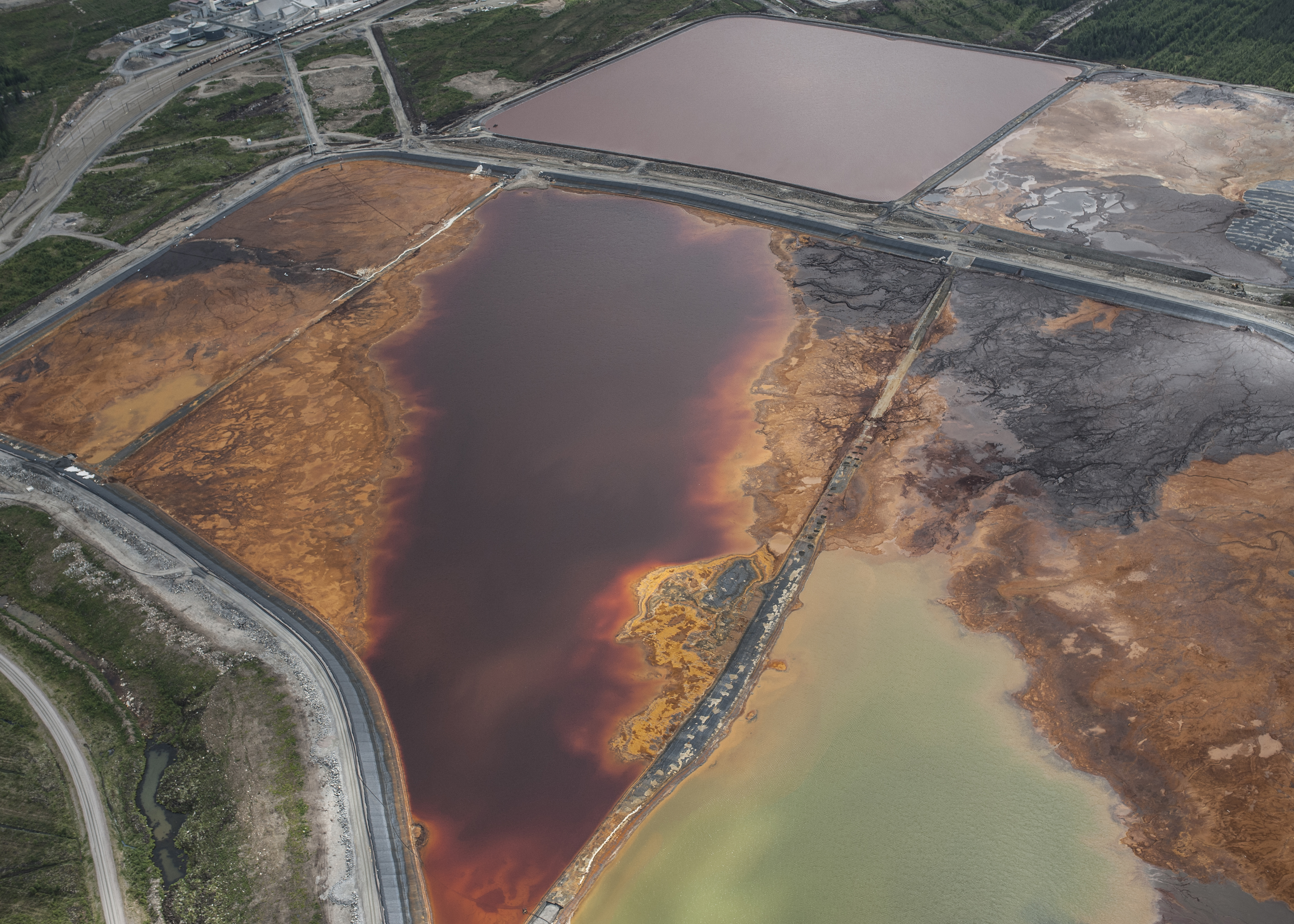
Gypsum pond in June 2013.

In November 2012, there was a major leak from the gypsum waste pond, which is contaminated with nickel, uranium and other toxic metals. Finland's Environment Minister visited the site, after calling it "a serious environmental crime". The mining firm posted a 4.3 million euro loss in the third quarter of 2012, blaming weak output and low nickel prices. On the same day, Finland's largest newspaper, Helsingin Sanomat, published an editorial column that labeled the company "a large-scale failure, that casts a shadow on the efficiency of the Finnish society as a whole", criticizing Finnish officials for not taking administrative action against the mining company for its environmental problems. With warmer spring weather, this holding pond recently leaked an estimated 250,000 cubic meters of contaminated liquid into the environment again.

==== Leak and company response ====
The Talvivaara waste water pond leaked uranium and other toxic metals into the environment. Earlier than normal winter conditions provide an additional challenge to manage this problem. Freezing temperatures should help solidify the dams that are being built for the winter, but this temporary advantage will be lost in the spring. Teams of army conscripts and local volunteer firefighters worked with the company around the clock. Helicopters were in use, in addition to large-scale earth-moving equipment. About 200 people were involved in the hasty repair effort. According to the company, the leak has been stopped.

The mining company's CEO Harri Natunen stated that "We have [a] legally mandated liability insurance that covers expenses if we're unable to pay". It was not clear, however, if all cleanup expenses would still be covered if the company went into bankruptcy. Natunen also stated that the risk for future leaks would be eliminated. He further promised that the leak at the mine would be its last. Local weather conditions have continued to improve, which should allow work crews to carefully inspect the repairs, and provide evidence based evaluations of the current situation. Preventative aerial application of lime has commenced, to curtail the spread of the toxic metal plume in the naturally acidic soil of the region.

On 15 November 2012, the original CEO, Pekka Perä, returned to the post to stabilize the situation, and pledged to cover all the damages caused by the leak, and not sell his own stock in the mine. His analysis was that exceptionally high rainfall was the ultimate cause for the leak. This forced the workers to pump acidic overflowing water into the gypsum pond, which was intended only for neutralized tailings. Thus, the effect of the leak was more severe as the acidic water dissolved more metals. Mr. Perä apologized for the emotional and potential environmental harm.

===== Leaking resumes in April 2013 =====
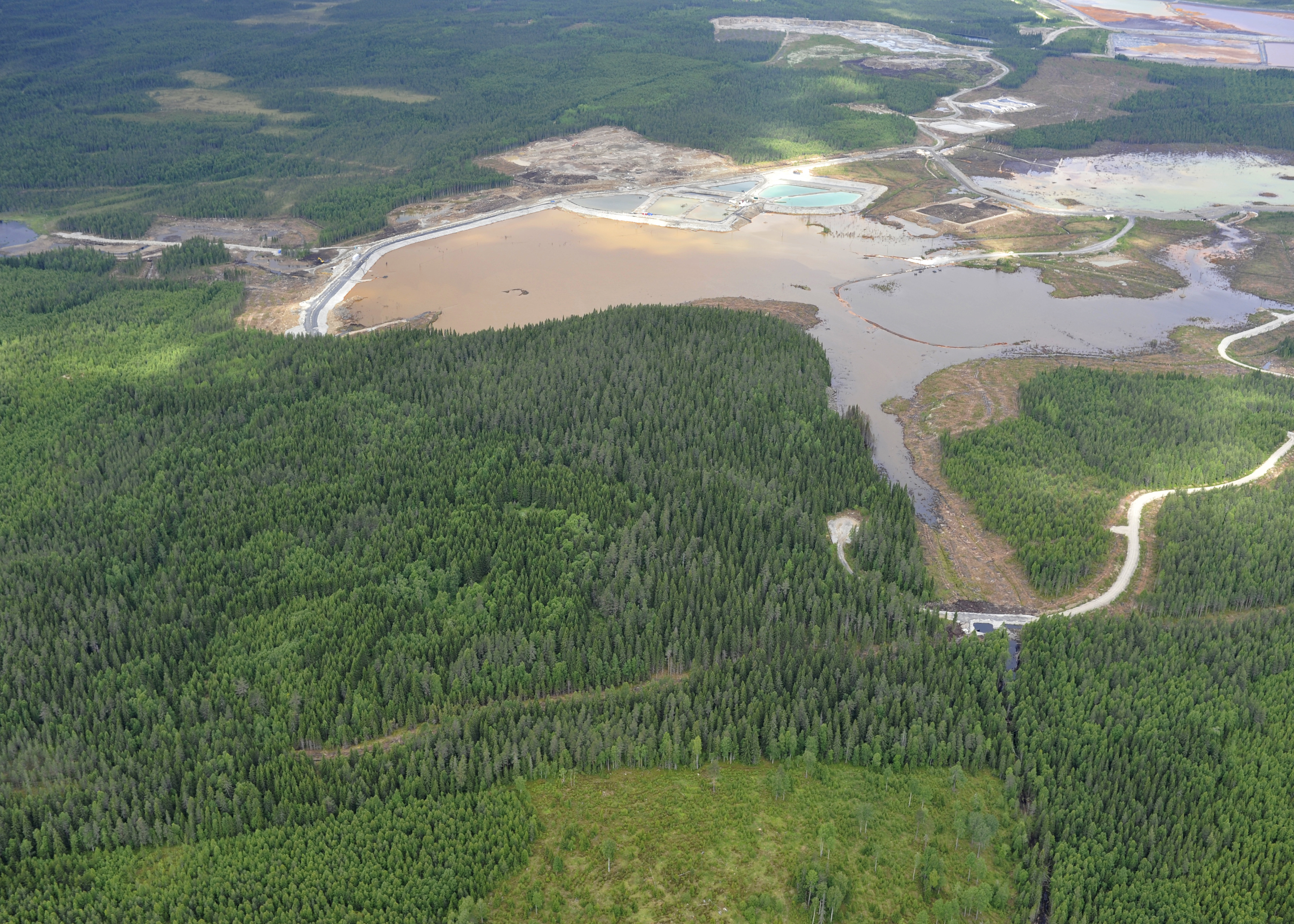
The holding ponds in June 2013.

While winter repairs had been stabilized by freezing temperatures, recent spring weather has allowed more contaminated liquid to escape from the holding pond. Talvivaara was leaking waste water 7,000 cubic metres an hour on 8 April 2013 from a leak that was noticed on Sunday. Before this leak there were 620,000 cubic meters of waste water in the reservoir, and Monday afternoon 370,000 cubic meters remained, with 250,000 cubic meters of contaminated liquid released into the environment, again. In comparison, a large oil tanker contains 100,000 cubic metres.

On 9 April 2013 it was announced that the recent leak has been plugged, and the Talvivaara mining company was quick to claim that there is no fear that the leak might resume again. It was not immediately clear how company officials were able to predict the future with such confidence. Harri Natunen, Talvivaara's head of production, admitted that "...less than 400,000 cubic metres of waste water had escaped the pond" recently, which is considerably more than the 250,000 cubic meters that were suggested to have leaked on 8 April 2013. This is the fourth major discharge from the mine since 2008, with three in the last six months.

The troubled Talvivaara Mining Company requested permission on 10 April 2013 to release an additional 820,000 cubic meters of waste water into the local environment, on top of the 1.8 million cubic metres for which it already has permits. A portion of the additional 820,000 cubic meters (620,000 cubic meters) is planned to be released from the leaking gypsum pond, which contains high levels of uranium and other toxic metals. Releasing such a large amount of contaminated waste water into the environment would help take pressure off from the pond's containment structure, which has softened as a consequence of the recent spring thaw. Freezing winter temperatures had kept the waste water from leaking during the previous four months, but the renewed leak on 8 April 2013 has demonstrated that this temporary advantage has now been lost. It is presently not clear if the mining company will wait for the integrity of the pond to fail in a catastrophic way, or if they will move ahead with an unauthorized release of waste water. It is unlikely that a permit will be granted in time that would allow a more managed response. The regional office of the Finnish Economic Development, Transport and the Environment (ELY Centre) has apparently adopted a wait and see policy, as its mandate to monitor both economic development in the area and environmental concerns seem to be at odds, and such internal confusion tends to limit the ability of ELY to make such important decisions. It is also unclear if the company's insurance policy will cover cleanup if the Talvivaara company goes into bankruptcy. On 12 April 2013, Talvivaara Mining Company submitted another application to release additional quantities of waste water into the local environment.

After releasing even more contaminated water into the surrounding environment that spring, the Talvivaara Mining Company announced that mining operations restarted on Monday 13 May 2013. The mine was previously expected to restart no sooner than that summer, but the amount of leaked liquid was sufficient to advance the schedule by several months. Certainly the company was eager to recover from the serious financial losses that came with the accidental leak that began last year, and an earlier restart should help to restore the bottom line for this troubled fiscal year. According to the company, the resumption of ore production will improve overall water levels and site water management. Apparently this improvement will come through dissolving the contaminated waste water with more clean water. Additional waste water was leaked this spring to relieve stress on the walls of the leaky holding pond that was repaired last winter, to make room for the larger volumes of diluted waste water that is expected from the new waste management plan. There was no public mention of creating larger or additional holding ponds at this point, nor the possibility of simply cutting back on production.

On 21 May 2013, Talvivaara waste water colored River Lumijoki near the mine red and orange.

==== Government response ====
Finland's Permanent Secretary at the Ministry of Employment and the Economy informed that the company's operations cannot continue before further studies are completed. He said that results from waste water samples indicate that the environmental permits issued were not in line with its current operations. The Safety Investigation Authority, a government agency responsible for investigation of major accidents, has started an investigation about Talvivaara.

The government agency Finnish Environment Institute (SYKE) determined that the individual metal plumes released into Lumijoki are concentrated enough to potentially cause local fish kills far downstream. The largest problem is accumulation of aluminum into the gills, but nickel, zinc, cadmium and uranium are also expected to cause ichthyotoxicity. However, no prohibitions of fishing have been imposed, because aluminum and cadmium only accumulate in parts that are discarded as offal (gills and livers, respectively). However, with aggressive liming, acidification has been successfully limited and no fish kills have materialized. The Finnish National Institute for Health and Welfare (THL) has declared that waste water leaked from the Talvivaara mining "has no immediate serious effects on human health". The Finnish Radiation and Nuclear Authority (STUK) reported uranium levels 3.5 times higher than the recommended limit of 100 micrograms per liter, but not high enough to be acutely dangerous to humans. In March 2012, the concentration of uranium was 600 micrograms of uranium per litre in a pond near the Talvivaara mine at Sotkamo. The upper limit for drinking water is 100 μg/l.

Talvivaara was allowed to pump 300.000 m^{3} metal-containing wastewaters to natural lakes outside the mine area in November 2012.

Environmental officials at the local Ely-keskus requested in January 2013 opinions on the proposal from the Finnish Safety and Chemicals Agency Tukes and the Radiation and Nuclear Safety Authority (STUK).

Finland's Minister for International Development, Heidi Hautala (Green Party) has recently criticized the government's state-run investment company Solidium for quietly doubling its share holdings in the beleaguered Talvivaara Mining Company. Solidium now controls 17 percent of Talvivaara shares, making it the company's largest single shareholder. On Monday 15 April, Hautala criticised Solidium's actions in the Talvivaara case, saying that the government investor (Solidium) should have engaged in serious reflection, since Talvivaara could not by any means be considered a good investment. Apparently this decision was made without much discussion within the government.

In October 2013, the Vaasa Administrative Court ruled that the company must limit waste water discharges.

In September 2014, four directors including the current and former CEO were charged with an aggravated environmental offense, which carries a sentence of four months to six years imprisonment. The prosecutor also seeks a fine of 850,000 €, the legal maximum, to be imposed on the Talvivaara Mining Company. The court process will begin in Kainuu district court. Nevertheless, the board unanimously decided to continue the CEO's tenure; the company denies all charges of a criminal offense. The plaintiffs are three partition units, two property owners and two state agencies.

==== Public response ====
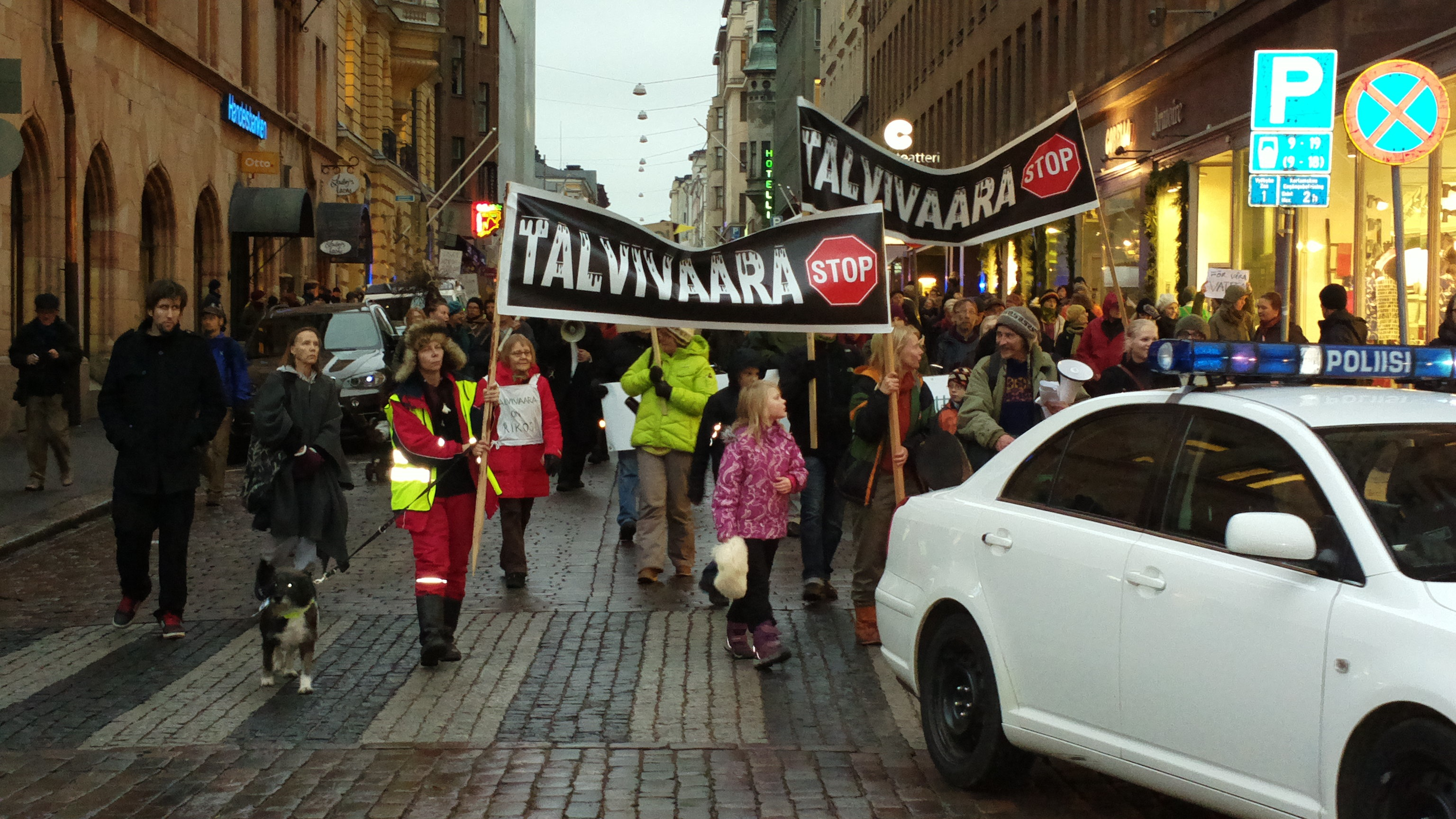
Demonstration against Talvivaara in Helsinki, Finland on November 14th, 2012.

On 14 December 2012, the demonstration was organized by a citizen movement called Stop Talvivaara. One of the leaders is Hannu Hyvönen, who had filmed footage on the mine's area. Finnish Association for Nature Conservation and Greenpeace Nordic were invited to take part in the demonstration, and they both had a word in the citizen forum, as guests speakers of Stop Talvivaara. The demonstration took place in 14.11.2012 in Helsinki. Finnish Association for Nature Conservation reminded that the environmental law demands immediate corrective action and restoration. In November 2012, Greenpeace demanded to close Talvivaara mining operations. Journalists have not been permitted to enter the area to acquaint themselves with the situation. In November 2012, Finland's largest environmental NGO, the Finnish Association for Nature Conservation, called for government intervention in the matter.

About 100 claims for damages have been lodged by property owners, but more are expected.

Janne I. Hukkinen, professor of environmental policy at University of Helsinki, criticized the new environmental administration of Finland. The previous government established local ELY centres, which are responsible for employment and economic policy, transport and environmental monitoring. Thus, the local environmental agencies, which were previously governed independently, were placed under the jurisdiction of an officer responsible to the Ministry of Employment and the Economy. Indeed, the ministers responsible, Paula Lehtomäki and Jyri Häkämies, gave the responsibility for all the environmental permits and regulation of the Talvivaara mine to a single official. Häkämies, the Minister of Economic Affairs, resigned shortly after the event. Prof. Hukkinen demands that the independent environmental administration should be re-established such that it could be openly critical of business interests.

The Finnish Association for Nature Conservation (SLL) demanded closing of Talvivaara mine in May 2013.

== Safety at work ==
At the beginning of 2012, an employee was killed in Talvivaara's Sotkamo site. Preliminary reports say that the death was caused by a lethal concentration of hydrogen sulfide in the air. Authorities shut the plant down temporarily until some rudimentary safety mechanisms were installed. The plant was later cleared to continue operation, but with to the shutdown in November 2012, Tukes denied the permission to restart the processes, citing lacking safety evaluations for planned changes in the process equipment.

Later hydrogen sulfide poisoning was confirmed the cause of death of the worker. According to The Finnish Safety and Chemicals Agency (Tukes) deficiencies in the planning and safety control of the plant for the metal recovery were the cause of the accident. A lethal concentration of hydrogen sulfide was released outside the leach residue pond of the metal recovery plant. The mining company had already before noticed the hazard, but the reasons for increased concentrations of hydrogen sulfide were not found out systematically. Shortage of defining responsibilities, flow of information, operations and working habits of the organisation were also discovered in the investigation by Tukes.

High H_{2}S concentration in air was the reason of the death. Acci Map safety analyses developed by Tukes found the safety risk not included in the company risk analyses. While the immediate reason was the accidentally open valve, the reason was the consequences this caused in the plant process. The automatic pump mixed solutions that evolved large amounts of CO_{2} gas. The releasing gas mixture including H_{2}S burst out from the storage vessel. Calm weather did not disperse the emission.

== Public relations ==
The company did not inform the environmental administration of the potential uranium leak risk before starting operations.

When birds were killed in the pond, the company tried to contain the spread of information of the event, and sued, unsuccessfully, the person who noticed the event and informed the administration.

Talvivaara promised to publish the VTT study report that was ready in March 2013, but did not immediately publish it. Parts selected by the board of directors were published at the end of April. It revealed that Talvivaara had intentionally pumped unneutralized, highly acidic metal solution into the gypsum pond, which was intended only for neutralized tailings. This was contrary to the environmental permit and thus illegal by itself. The higher acidity allowed much higher concentrations of toxic metals to dissolve and spread into the environment when a leak occurred. Talvivaara had attempted to conceal this from the public and the government, hindering for instance the EU inquiry.

== Talvivaara activism ==
There are two Talvivaara activist groups: The Talvivaara Expert Group (Talvivaara asiantuntijaryhmä) and Stop Talvivaara group (www.talvivaara.org). The former is centered around consultants and recently reformed universities and does not publish its information. The latter is a grass-root organization with a public site.
