= Leif Fagernäs =

Leif Richard Fagernäs (born 2 January 1947) is the former CEO of the Confederation of Finnish Industries (2004–10). Prior to the appointment of the Finnish Ambassador to Berlin, he was CEO of the Confederation of Industry and Employers. His predecessor was Kalevi Hemila.

Fagernäs was born in Oulu, and graduated as a bachelor of law from the University of Helsinki in 1971. He has been employed by the Foreign Service since 1972, both at home and abroad. Fagernäs is the captain of his military rank. Leif Fagernäs's grandfather was Uno Fagernäs.
