= Mäntysuopa =

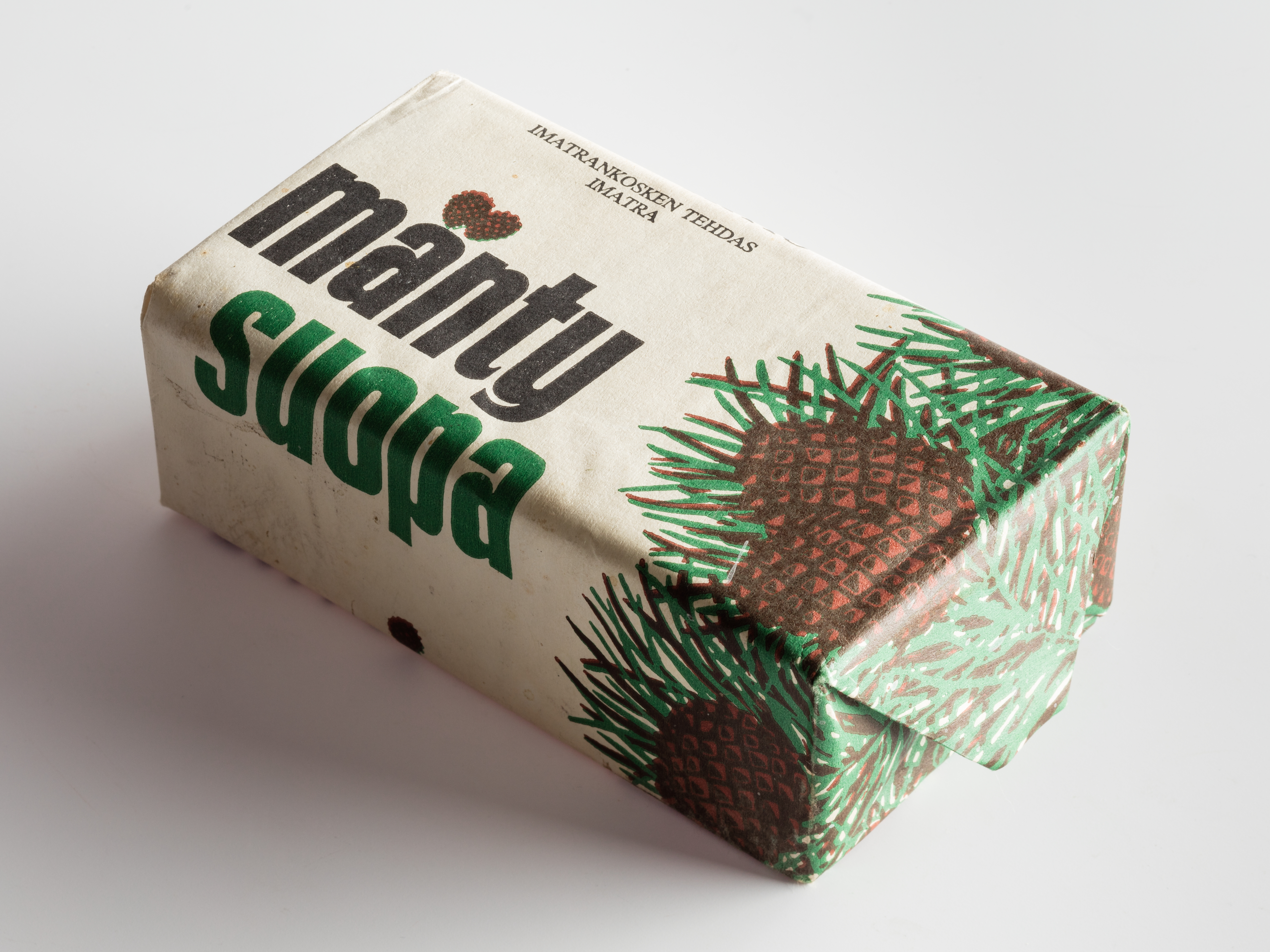
A brick of mäntysuopa weighing 500 grams in a protective paper wrapper, produced at the Enso-Gutzeit factory at Imatrankoski.

Mäntysuopa (Finnish pronunciation: [ˈmæntyˌsuo̯pɑ]) is an alkaline detergent used mainly in Finland. The detergent is made of tall oil produced as the by-product of wood pulp. Mäntysuopa is used for example for washing mats and blankets. When diluted, mäntysuopa can be used in the garden to deter pests such as aphids and larvae of butterflies and hymenoptera. The Finnish Safety and Chemicals Agency (TUKES) has removed mäntysuopa from the list of allowed pest deterrents in 2010, as there was not enough research for its use in protecting plants.

Mäntysuopa is sold both as bricks and as a detergent solution.

== History ==
Mäntysuopa was invented by a group of researches led by the chemist-engineer Alfons Hellström at the Enso-Gutzeit factory in Kotka in 1913. The first mäntysuopa factory was founded in the same city in 1920. At first, mäntysuopa was only sold as bricks, but the introduction of mäntysuopa solution to the market increased its popularity. The sales of the detergent were at their highest just after World War II, about four million kilograms per year. Today the sales are about 1.5 million kilograms per year.
