= 2008 United Nations Climate Change Conference =

United Nations Climate Change Conference COP14
- Dates: 1 December 2008– 12 December 2008
- Locations: PIF Congress Centre, Poznań International Fair, Poznań, Poland
- Previous event: ← Bali 2007
- Next event: Copenhagen 2009 →
- Participants: UNFCCC member countries

The 2008 United Nations Climate Change Conference took place at PIF Congress Centre, Poznań International Fair (PIF), in Poznań, Poland, between December 1 and December 12, 2008. Representatives from over 180 countries attended along with observers from intergovernmental and nongovernmental organizations.

The conference encompassed meetings of several bodies, including the 14th Conference of the Parties to the United Nations Framework Convention on Climate Change (COP 14) and the 4th Meeting of the Parties to the Kyoto Protocol (MOP 4 or CMP 4). Subsidiaries of these bodies also met, including the fourth session of the Ad Hoc Working Group on Long-term Cooperative Action under the Convention (AWG-LCA 4), a resumed session of the Ad HocWorking Group on Further Commitments for Annex I Parties under the Kyoto Protocol (AWG-KP 6), and the twenty-ninth sessions of the Subsidiary Body for Implementation (SBI 29), and the Subsidiary Body for Scientific and Technological Advice (SBSTA 29).

== History of climate change ==
Since the late 1800s, the surface of the Earth has experienced an increase of 0.6 °C in global temperatures. The Earth historically has experienced periods of large increases in global temperatures. For example, around 2 million B.C the surface temperature of the Earth is estimated to have been 5 °C warmer than today. While these temperatures increased as a result of the natural warming and cooling of the Earth, current increases in global temperatures are attributed to increasing amounts of greenhouse gases in the atmosphere. Greenhouse gases have increased since the late 19th century due to the industrialization of nations worldwide. Examples of greenhouse gases include carbon dioxide, methane, nitrous oxide, and hydro-fluorocarbons. While each of these have a significant impact on the effects of greenhouse gases, carbon dioxide is considered to be the most important as approximately three-quarters of the human-generated global warming effect may attributed to increased carbon dioxide output .

The levels of carbon dioxide and other greenhouse gases have increased dramatically since the late 19th century. Until the late 1970s, scientists were unable to determine to what degree human behavior contributed to the increase in greenhouse gases. However, since then, scientists have recognized that the Earth is unable to dispose of the increasing levels of carbon dioxide naturally through the carbon cycle. As a result, excessive levels of carbon dioxide trap heat in the Earth's atmosphere and cause global warming. The global warming of the Earth's surface creates climate change that affects humans in a variety of ways, including: the melting of polar ice caps, increasing sea levels, droughts, storms, and floods.

== Previous climate change action ==
The first World Climate Conference was held by the World Meteorological Organization (WMO) in 1979 in Geneva, Switzerland. The conference established that "continued expansion of man's activities on earth may cause significant extended regional and even global changes of climate". The WMO created the Intergovernmental Panel on Climate Change (IPCC) in 1988 to provide a source of "objective information" on global climate change. Then in 1992, 154 nations signed the United Nations Framework Convention on Climate Change (FCCC), which aimed to reduce emission levels in industrialized nations. The FCCC is a set of principles and does not legally bind a country to specific standards. Primarily, the FCCC seeks to "establish a set of principles, norms, and goals" amongst nations. In 1997, 159 nations signed the Kyoto Protocol. The Kyoto Protocol carries a legal obligation for nations to uphold specific standards in the reduction of greenhouse gases and emissions. The Kyoto Protocol defines countries as being "Annex 1 parties" or "non-Annex 1 parties". Annex 1 parties are industrialized nations while non-Annex 1 refers to developing nations.

== Issues with the FCCC and Kyoto Protocol ==
The FCCC sought to have nations reduce greenhouse gas emissions to more acceptable levels in 1990. However, the convention did not specify emission targets or create standards that were legally binding. As a result, of the 154 nations that signed the FCCC, only 50 chose to ratify the standards set by the convention. Additionally, the FCCC failed to include emissions resulting from aviation and shipping under the standards set by the convention.

The Kyoto Protocol focuses primarily on the production of greenhouse gases and not the consumption. For example, a nation may import high carbon goods such as steel or aluminum, but still have a relatively low output of greenhouse gases. The Kyoto Protocol places a large amount of pressure on Annex 1 nations to reduce their emissions. Annex 1 nations face harsher goals of emission reduction compared to non-Annex 1 nations. The Kyoto Protocol also establishes carbon emission caps that create strain on industrialized nations and their ability to produce and consume goods.

== Focuses of the conference ==
Negotiations on a successor to the Kyoto Protocol were the primary focus of the conference. Management of the Adaptation Fund was addressed during the conference and led to a decision granting easier access to the money available in the fund. Delegates from varying countries suggested increasing the levy of 2% on certified emission reductions to 3% in order to provide the fund with additional money that would aid developing countries in establishing protection from natural disasters and droughts. Another important issue addressed was carbon capture and storage - specifically whether it should be implemented as a pilot program or if it should be incorporated as a part of the clean development mechanism.

The International Atomic Energy Agency presented information regarding the role of nuclear energy in reducing the effect of climate change. Holger Rogner, head of the IAEA's Planning and Economic Studies Section and lead IAEA delegate at the conference, reasoned in his presentation that use of nuclear power produces fewer green house gases relative to those produced by other sources of fuels, such as fossil fuels. The IAEA introduced their newest publication entitled Climate Change and Nuclear Power 2008 to the delegates in attendance. The book focused on the benefits of nuclear power in climate change mitigation as well as addressing potential fuel supply, safety, and security concerns.

== Opposition ==
At the time of the 2008 United Nations Climate Change conference, over 650 international scientists expressed doubt regarding the claims made about global climate change by scientists representing the UN, who have published papers providing evidence of climate change, such as the Intergovernmental Panel on Climate Change 2007 Summary for Policymakers. Arguments exist over how sensitive Earth's climate is to increasing levels of carbon dioxide. According to the International Policy Network (IPN), debates exist over Intergovernmental Panel on Climate Change (IPNN) claims' on climate change and how realistic these situations are.

Canada was singled out as a country that was particularly resistant to making changes regarding climate change at the 2008 conference. In a comparison of countries' climate change performance, Canada was ranked next to last in developing regulations to decrease its impact on climate change. Canada's lack of regulations for the Alberta tar sands, the largest source of greenhouse gases in the country, brought further criticism to the Canadian government and its lack of greenhouse reduction targets.

According to multiple 1998 nationwide polls, the United States public viewed global warming as a "real problem that requires action". In July 1997 the United States Senate passed Senate Resolution 98 that would not ratify any treaty imposing mandatory greenhouse gas reductions without other developed nations imposing the same sanctions, or that would pose serious harm in the economy. Despite a general American concern being expressed over climate change studies show that opinions of American range from citizens believing that climate change is hoax, or "alarmists with extreme perceptions to naysayers".

== Outcomes ==
Varying opinions about the success of the conference have been expressed by various media publications from a multitude of countries in attendance. The conference mainly focused on planning for what would come at the 2009 conference in Copenhagen. At the conclusion of the conference, delegates from all of the parties in attendance agreed to submit their national reduction targets and measures for 2020 by mid February 2009. Delegates made progress on discussing how to effectively transfer environment-friendly technology to developing countries and concurred that the need to reduce deforestation has reached a level of urgency.

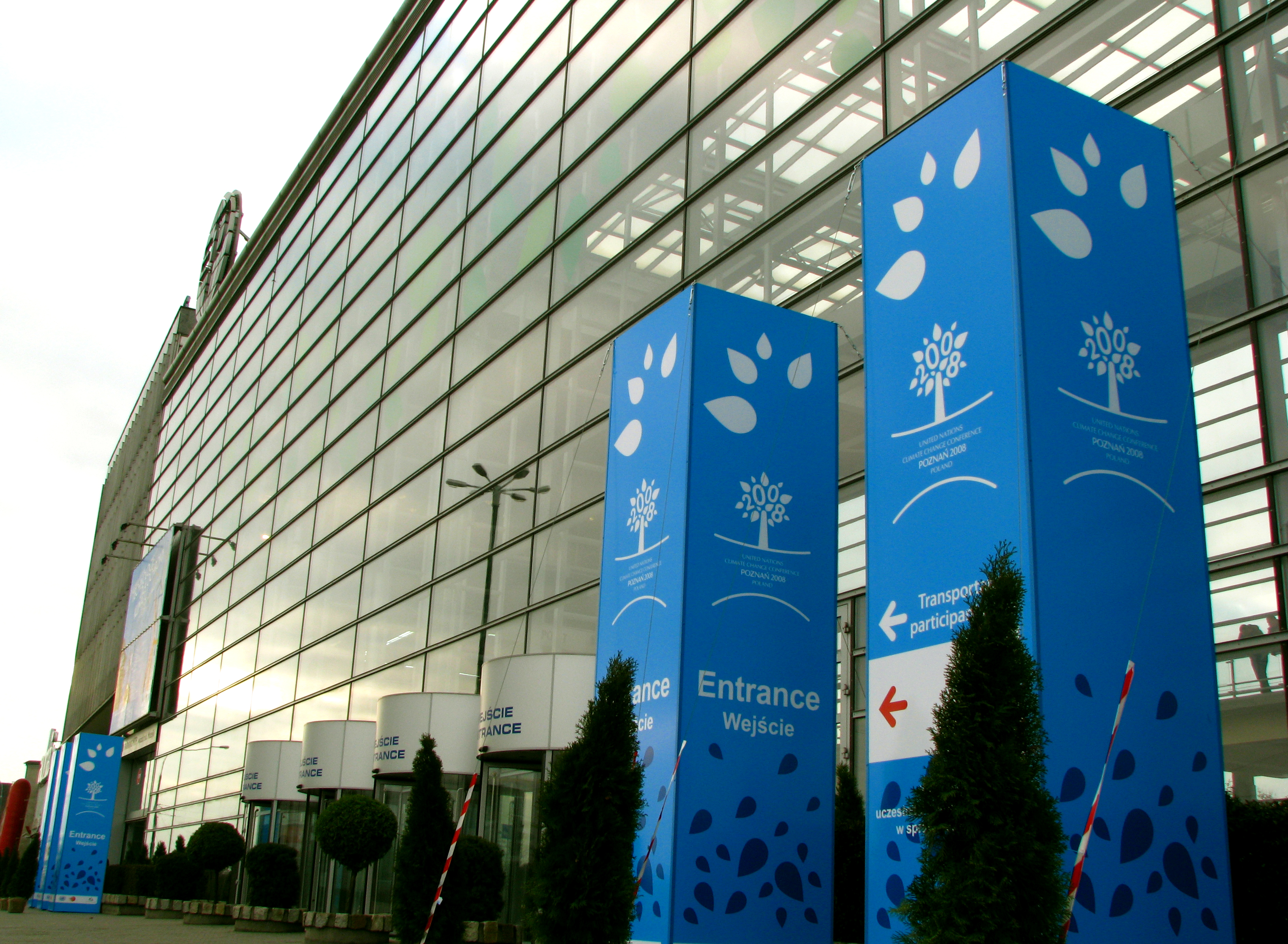
COP 14, United Nations Framework Convention on Climate Change - COP14. Poznań. Entrance PIF

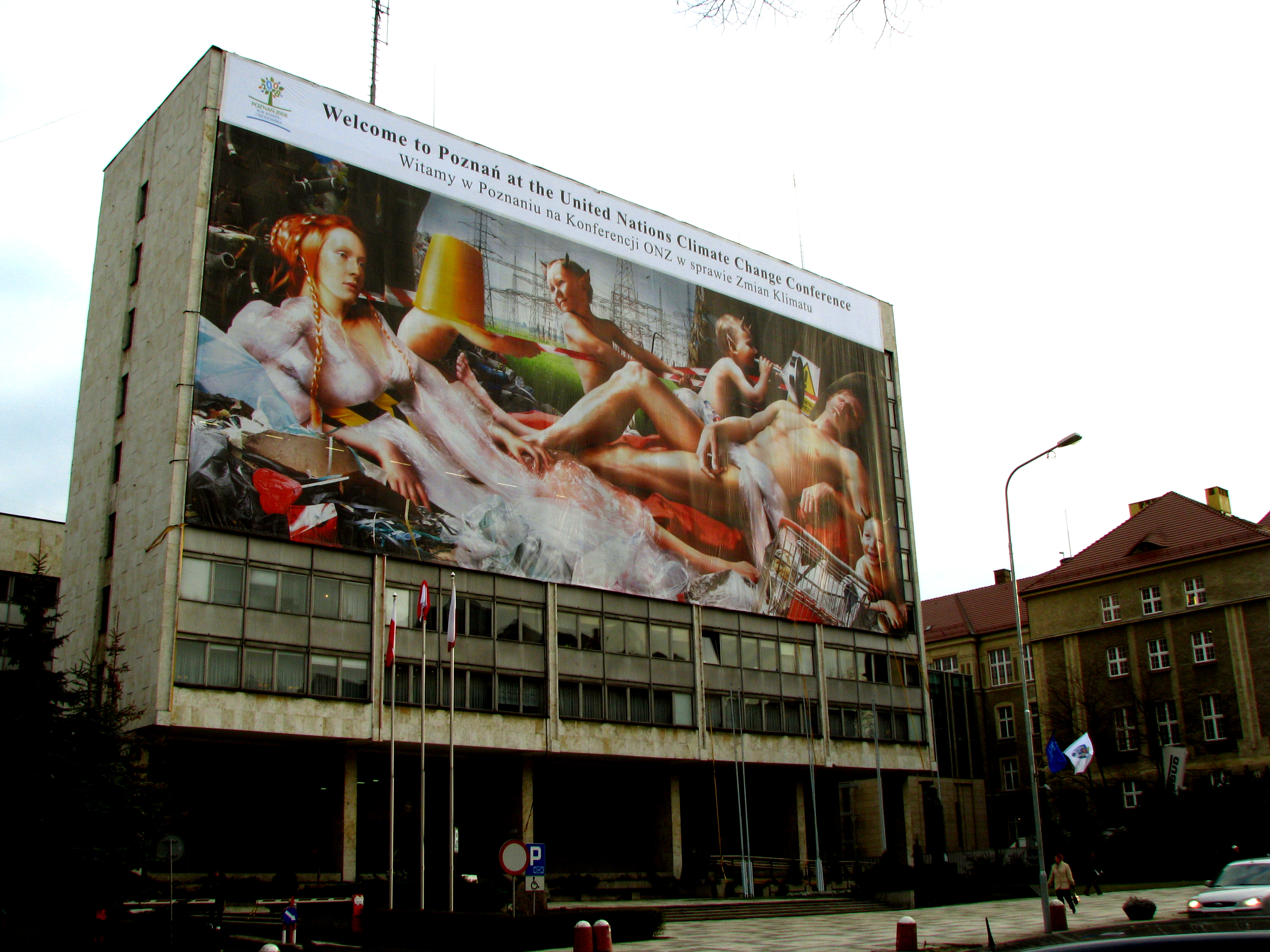
On building "ecological" collage

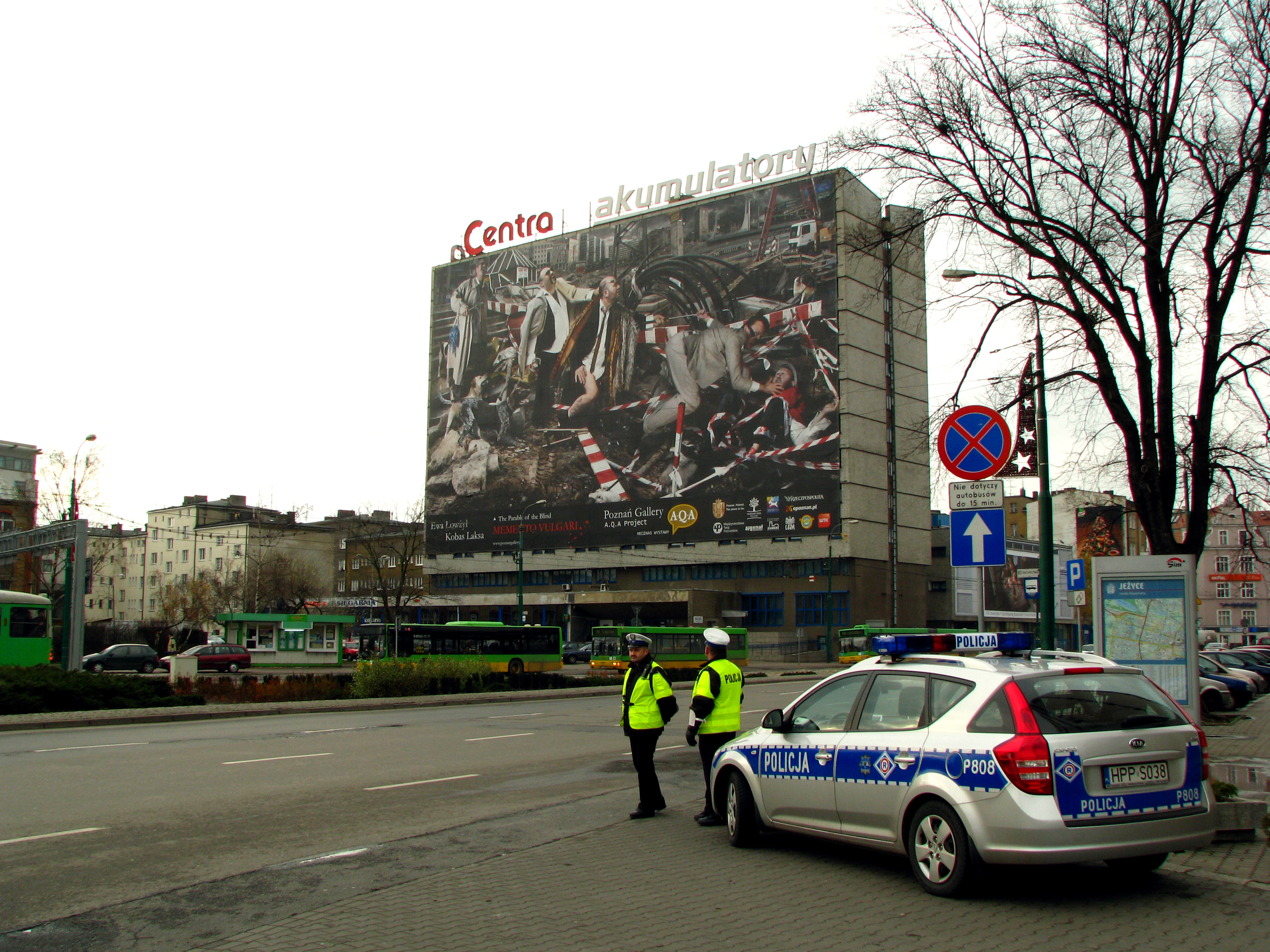
Extraordinary protection of city during COP 14

== See also ==
- Climate Change TV
