= Ministry of Economic Affairs and Employment =

Government ministry of Finland

Agency overview
- Headquarters: Finnish Government
- Ministers responsible: Sakari Puisto, Minister of Economic Affairs; Matias Marttinen, Minister of Employment
- Website: tem.fi

The Ministry of Economic Affairs and Employment (TEM, Finnish: Työ- ja elinkeinoministeriö, Swedish: Arbets- och näringsministeriet) is one of the ministries of the Finnish Government. The ministry implements industry, labor, and local development policies.

There are two ministerial portfolios located within the ministry:

- Minister of Economic Affairs
- Minister of Employment

The ministry was formed in 2008 by merging the former Ministry of Labour (työministeriö), the former Ministry of Trade and Industry (kauppa- ja teollisuusministeriö), and parts of the Ministry of the Interior (sisäministeriö) related to local administration. The first minister was Mauri Pekkarinen. The combination was called superministeriö because it was so large and diverse. The intention of the merger was to make sure that labor policy and industrial policy, as well as others such as immigration policy and regional policy, are coordinated and don't go separate ways.

The ministry manages 15 local employment and economy offices, 15 local Centres for Economic Development, Transport and the Environment and a host of separate national agencies.

== Agencies ==
Government agencies:

- Energy authority
- Finnish Competition and Consumer Authority
- Finnish Patent and Registration Office
- Geological Survey of Finland
- National Emergency Supply Agency
- The Finnish Safety and Chemicals Agency (Tukes)

Companies:

- Business Finland Ltd
- Finnvera Plc
- Industry Investment Ltd
- VTT Technical Research Centre of Finland Ltd
- Finnish Minerals Group

Funds:

- Nuclear Waste Management Fund
- Security of Supply Fund
- State Guarantee Fund

== See also ==
- Finnfacts, Finnish media organisation
- List of Finnish government enterprises
- Solidium
