= Klimaforum09 =

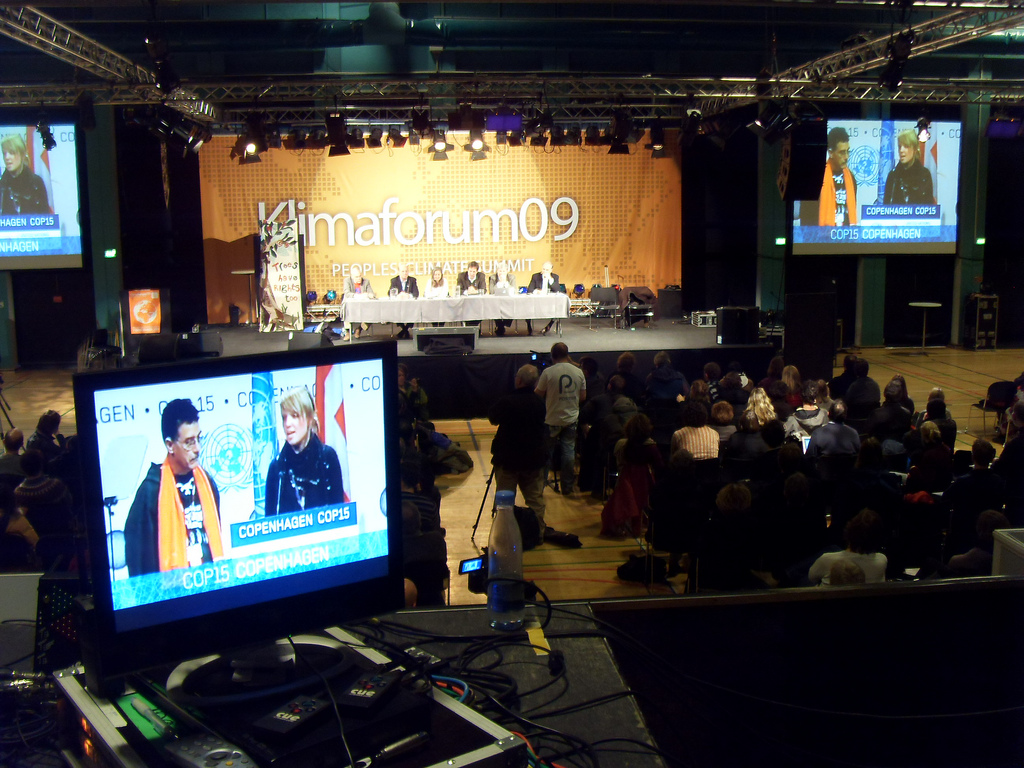
Klimaforum09 Declaration Hand Over to COP15 18 12 2009

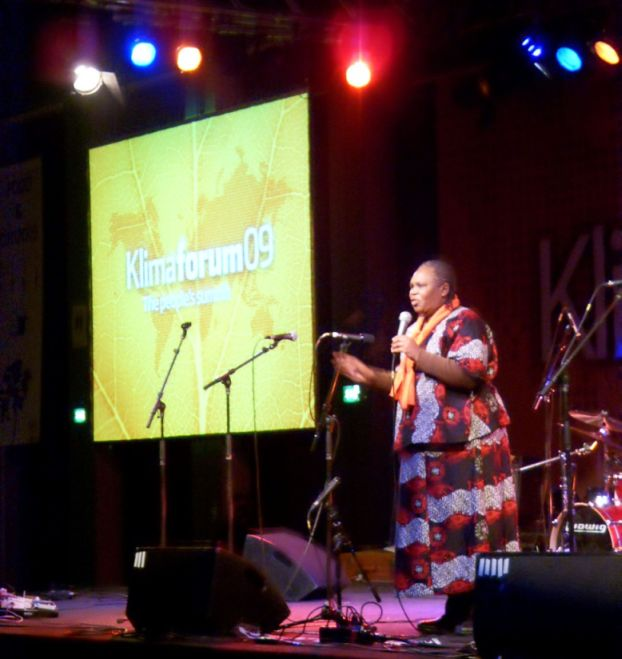
Klimaforum09 closing ceremony.

Klimaforum09 – People's Climate Summit, an open and alternative climate conference in December 2009, was attended by about 50,000 people. Environmental activists from regions of the world most affected by climate change convened in Copenhagen at Klimaforum09 with leaders such as Vandana Shiva, founder of Navdanya, Nnimmo Bassey, chair of Friends of the Earth International, and author Naomi Klein.

A People's Declaration from Klimaforum09 was formulated before and during the People's Climate Summit calling for "System change – not climate change" and handed over to the 15th Conference of the Parties of United Nations Framework Convention on Climate Change at 18 December.

Klimaforum09 took place from 7 to 18 December 2009 in the DGI-byen conference center, near the Copenhagen Central Station, as open and alternative event during UNFCCC COP15. The summit with over 300 debates, exhibitions, films, concerts and plays was organised by the Klimaforum network, a broad network of civil society organisations, and realized with the help of hundreds of volunteers.
