= Finnfacts =

Finnish media organization

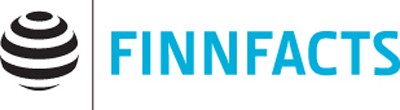
- Industry: Communications
- Founded: 1960
- Headquarters: Helsinki, Finland
- Website: Business FinlandGood News from Finland

Finnfacts is a Finnish media organisation. It promotes Finnish know-how by organizing international media visits and publishing the Good News from Finland news site.

Finnfacts has been part of Business Finland since 2016. Finnfacts’ activities were previously funded by the Confederation of Finnish Industries EK and the Finnish Ministry of Employment and the Economy. In 2022 the Finnfacts website was discontinued as this unit was fully integrated into Business Finland's services.
