= National Emergency Supply Agency =

Finnish government agency

The National Emergency Supply Agency
- Finnish: Huoltovarmuuskeskus; Swedish: Försörjningsberedskapscentralen

Agency overview
- Formed: January 1, 1993
- Headquarters: Helsinki, Finland; 60.1687976°N 24.9420424°E
- Employees: 65
- Parent Ministry: Ministry of Economic Affairs and Employment
- Website: www.huoltovarmuuskeskus.fi/en

The National Emergency Supply Agency of Finland (NESA) (Finnish: Huoltovarmuuskeskus (HVK), Swedish: Försörjningsberedskapscentralen (FBC)) is an agency of the Finnish Ministry of Economic Affairs and Employment responsible for maintaining Finnish strategic reserves and preparedness. It is tasked to ensure a security of supply during a time of crisis.

== Strategic reserves and warehouses ==
The exact locations and contents of the Finnish emergency supply depots are classified, but they are based on a network of warehouses throughout Finland. Substantial Finnish strategic reserves are based on legally mandated responsibility for companies and organizations on critical areas to maintain certain level of stockpiles. The National Emergency Supply Agency also contracts certain companies to maintain preparedness for operations during crisis. While the precise items of the strategic reserves are classified, the general contents are:

- Fossil fuels for 5 months consumption
- Coal and alternatives for natural gas for 8 months consumption (Finland has no natural gas storage; the alternatives can be coal, peat, oil or wood)
- Cereal for 6 months consumption
- Cereal seeds
- Fodder for a few weeks
- Medicines for 12 months (as a legally mandated stockpiles in hospitals, pharmacies and medical companies)
- Ammunition and gunpowder, details are classified

== Ownership of critical companies ==
National Emergency Supply Agency owns stock of several companies important for the security of supply in Finland. The agency owns 24,9 % of the Finnish electricity grid operator Fingrid (the Finnish government owns directly an additional 28,24 % of Fingrid). When Neste Oil sold its tanker fleet they were purchased jointly by NESA and Ilmarinen Mutual Pension Insurance Company.

== COVID-19 pandemic ==
During the COVID-19 pandemic National Emergency Supply Agency released surgical masks and other medical personal protective equipment from the warehouses on 24.3.2020. While this was not the first time the strategic reserves had been used (seed stocks had been used in spring 2018 due to a poor harvest in 2017), the pandemic was the first time when medical stockpiles were used and the act was widely publicized. However even the use of the strategic reserves was not enough stop mask shortages. It was also found that many of the masks in storage were a decade old and some in poor condition.

As the mask shortage worsened NESA attempted to purchase 1.1 million KN95 breathing protectors and 2 million surgical masks for 5 million euros from China with Finnish business persons Onni Sarmaste and Tiina Jylhä. Eventually only a third of the breathing protectors (230 000 pieces) and 2 million masks were shipped to Finland and these were found to be inadequate for hospital use although still acceptable for nursing homes and home care. The poorly handled purchase led to the resignation of the NESA CEO Tomi Lounema as well as a criminal investigation against Lounema, Sarmaste and NESA managers Asko Harjula and Jyrki Hakola. No charges were eventually raised. The NESA was found to have acted poorly in the purchase but had been under substantial pressure from the Ministry of Social Affairs and Health and Ministry of Economic Affairs and Employment. Normally such a purchase would not have been handled by The National Emergency Supply Agency itself.
