= Climate Consortium Denmark =

Danish public–private partnership

State of Green
- Established: 2008
- Founders: Ministry of Foreign Affairs of Denmark; Ministry of Industry, Business and Financial Affairs; Ministry of Environment and Food of Denmark; Danish Ministry of Climate, Energy and Utilities; Confederation of Danish Industry; Danish Agriculture & Food Council; Danish Energy; Wind Denmark
- Type: not-for-profit public–private partnership
- Purpose: Climate change solutions
- Location: Copenhagen, Denmark
- Key people: State of Green's patron: H.R.H Crown Prince Frederik of Denmark
- Website: www.stateofgreen.com
- Formerly called: Climate Consortium Denmark

State of Green is a not-for-profit, public–private partnership promoting Danish cleantech solutions concerning climate change.

== Organisational purpose and activities ==
State of Green focuses its efforts around four global challenges.

- Powering future with sustainable energy
- Ensuring water security for a growing world
- Creating smart and liveable cities
- Moving towards a circular economy

=== House of Green ===
On September 5, 2013, the House of Green was inaugurated by H.R.H. Crown Prince Frederik of Denmark, the official patron of State of Green. House of Green was a project intended to be a unique visitor and exhibition centre with meeting facilities and a showroom, where Danish businesses, industry organisations, and public institutions could welcome foreign commercial and political decision-makers and introduce them to the Danish competencies within clean-tech.

On February 5, 2019, the House of Green was re-inaugurated by the Crown Prince after a comprehensive modernisation of the centre.

=== The platform ===
In 2018, the organisation re-launched the website into a platform, where Danish companies, organizations and authorities within the energy, water, cities and circular economy can present and market their green efforts. The aim of the platform was to create knowledge and relationships between stakeholders working for green and innovative solutions. The scope of the organisation was inherently international, focusing on the possibilities of using Danish cleantech solutions in foreign markets.

== Historical context ==
Until the late 1970s, Denmark was almost exclusively dependent on fossil fuels. The 1973 oil crisis stressed the need for diversifying and securing renewable energy sources.

=== COP 15 ===
Between 7th and December 18, 2009, COP15 (also known as the Copenhagen Summit), was held in Copenhagen. State of Green, at the time known as Climate Consortium Denmark, was an integrated part of the official portfolio of activities before, during and after the COP15.

=== Energy Strategy 2050 ===
In February 2011, Danish government announced its "Energy Strategy 2050" with the aim to be fully independent of fossil fuels by 2050, and a new government repeated the goal in 2015 despite public scepticism.
