= Lumumba Di-Aping =

Sudanese diplomat

Lumumba Stanislaus-Kaw Di-Aping is a Sudanese diplomat, who is the chief negotiator for the G77 group of developing nations at the United Nations Climate Change Conference 2009, in Copenhagen, Denmark.

He has been described as "a McKinsey and Oxford-trained radical economist who not only matched the media spin of western countries, but was partly behind George Soros's plan to use hundreds of billions of dollars of International Monetary Fund special drawing rights to fund the financial deal."

== At the United Nations Climate Change Conference 2009 ==
He was highly critical of the so-called "Danish Text", which proposes measures to keep average global temperature rises to two degrees Celsius above pre-industrial levels. He said, "It's an incredibly imbalanced text intended to subvert, absolutely and completely, two years of negotiations. It does not recognize the proposals and the voice of developing countries". At a meeting of African delegates to the conference, he reportedly stated that: "We have been asked to sign a suicide pact.... What is [U.S. President Barack] Obama going to tell his daughters? That their [Kenyan] relatives’ lives are not worth anything? It is unfortunate that after 500 years-plus of interaction with the West we [Africans] are still considered 'disposables'.... My good friends... we’ve got to get together and fight the fight." He suggested a couple of slogans: "One Africa, one degree" and "Two degrees is suicide", following which a demonstration was organised in the conference centre using the slogans and attracting a reported storm of media interest. On 10 December 2009, he made a direct appeal to the United States to join the Kyoto Protocol and to contribute $200 billion "to save the world".

On 14 December, Di-Aping led the G77-China group in withdrawing cooperation from the negotiations. He stated: "It has become clear that the Danish presidency - in the most undemocratic fashion - is advancing the interests of the developed countries at the expense of the balance of obligations between developed and developing countries...The mistake they are doing now has reached levels that cannot be acceptable from a president who is supposed to be acting and shepherding the process on behalf of all parties."

On 19 December, Lumumba Di-Aping criticised Copenhagen's non-binding pact agreed by the United States, China, India, Brazil and South Africa. He said "[This] is asking Africa to sign a suicide pact, an incineration pact in order to maintain the economic dependence of a few countries. It's a solution based on values that funnelled six million people in Europe into furnaces." His remarks, comparing the climate-change deal reached to the Holocaust, have been condemned by both the UK climate secretary Ed Miliband and Sweden's chief negotiator Anders Turesson.

== In earlier discussions ==
Earlier in 2009, at the Bangkok climate change conference, Di-Aping had stated that "Developed countries have a massive leadership deficit. It's now up to their leaders to intervene and give a direction to the negotiations rather than waste everyone's time."

== Comments ==
Di-Aping has been described as "more disingenuous than candid in his bluster" and "hyperbole-prone", but also as "[a] clear, credible voice... articulating the frustration of so many".
