= Valby Internment =

Detention center in Valby, Denmark

Coordinates: 55°39′33″N 12°29′55″E

Danish Prisons
Valby Internment
Location:	Valby, Copenhagen
Status:	Operational
Classification:	Internment
Capacity:	346
Opened:	December 7, 2009
Closed:
Managed by:	Police of Denmark

The Internment in Valby is constructed in a former beer depot in relationship with the state of emergency laws introduced in relationship with the United Nations Climate Change Conference 2009 (COP15) December 2009

It is the primary detention used for climate activists, who will be arrested by the police. The police can detain people for 12 hours, which is called preemptive arrest

The procedure:

- 1) The detainees will be placed on benches in handcuffs until they will be called to be booked and searched.
- 2) Then they will be led to the cages (pejoratively called "dog cages" in the Danish media) which can each accommodate 8-10 persons.
- 3) If police investigation leads to charges the detainee will be transferred to Vestre Fængsel. Otherwise the detainee will be released after the 12-hour period since the arrest has passed.

There will be access to toilet and water. Food can be earned after 6 hours. Due to limited heating possibilities the detainees can be granted a blanket.

A common nickname in the press is the "Climate Prison"
