= Talvivaara mine =

Nickel mine in Sotkamo, Finland

Coordinates: 63.9674°N 28.0179°E

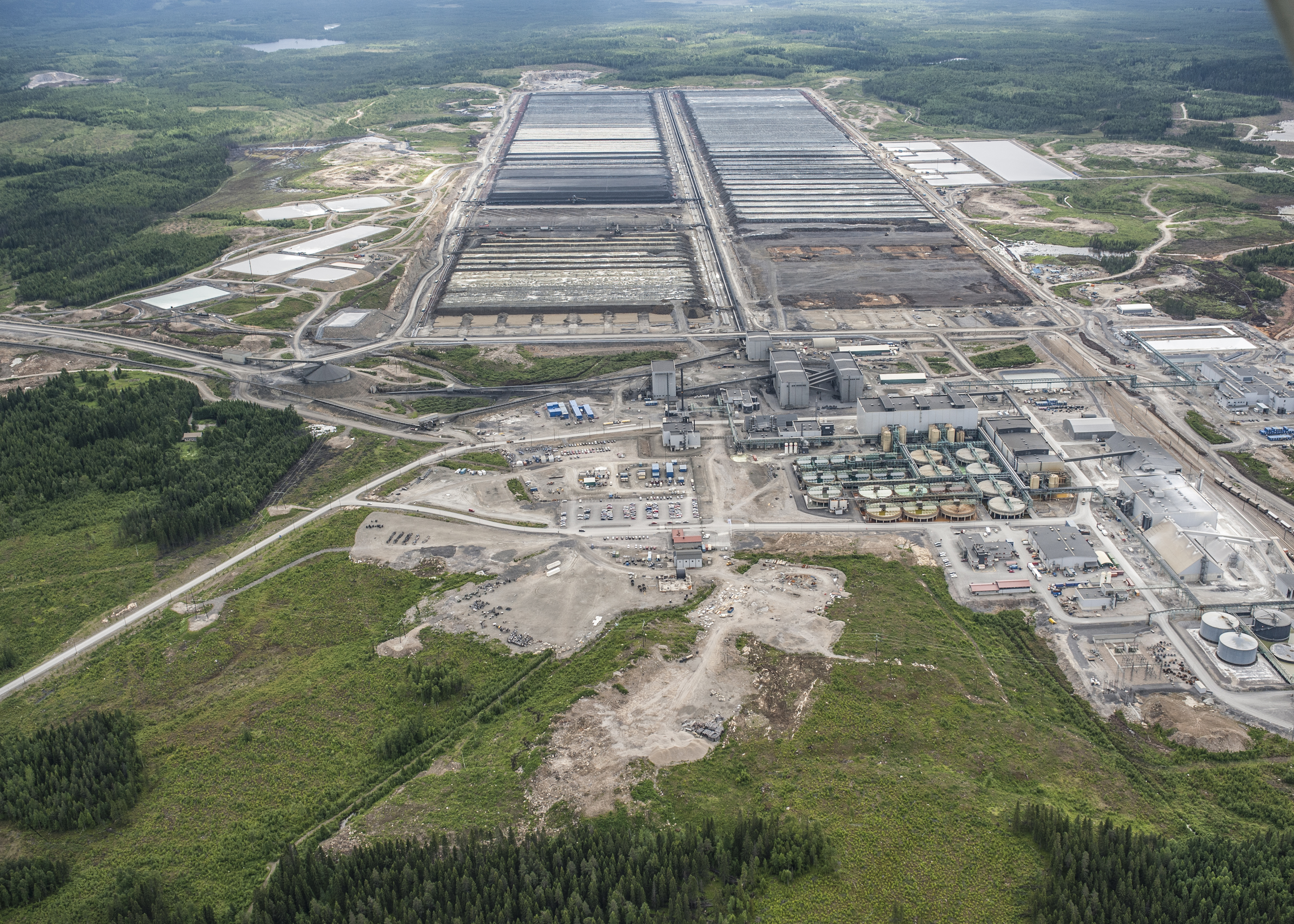
- Aerial photograph of Talvivaara mine in June 2013.
- Interactive map of Talvivaara mine
- Location: Sotkamo, Kainuu, Finland
- Products: Nickel, Copper, Zinc, Cobalt
- Production: 20,864 tons nickel; 47,205 tons zinc
- Financial year: 2017
- Type: Open-pit
- Opened: 2008
- Company: Terrafame
- Website: www.terrafame.com/front-page.html
- Acquired: 2015

The Talvivaara mine is one of the largest nickel mines in Finland. The mine is located in Sotkamo in Kainuu region of Finland. The mine is owned by government-established Terrafame, which bought it from the bankruptcy-bound Talvivaara Mining Company in 2015. Its annual production capacity is over 10 million tonnes of ore. The mine has reserves amounting to 1 billion tonnes of ore grading 0.22% nickel, 0.13% copper, 0.5% zinc and 0.02% cobalt thus resulting 2.2 million tonnes of nickel, 1.3 million tonnes of copper, 5 million tonnes of zinc and 0.2 million tonnes of cobalt.

The mine had suffered several leaks of toxic metal-contaminated tailings, which had threatened local waterways. Members of the management were charged with criminal environmental offenses.

== Uranium recovery ==
Ore at the mine contains small concentrations of uranium, which is dissolved from the ore during bioleaching. Terrafame started uranium recovery in June 2024. After the ramp-up phase, the mine is expected to produce 200 tonnes of uranium per year, which will be exported abroad for refining into nuclear power plant fuel. The production roughly corresponds to the consumption of the Loviisa nuclear power plant. Uranium recovery employs approximately 40 people and increases Terrafame's turnover by approximately €30 million to €40 million per year.
