= Finnish Safety and Chemicals Agency =

- Finnish: Turvallisuus- ja kemikaalivirasto Swedish: Säkerhets- och kemikalieverket

Agency overview
- Parent department: Ministry of Employment and the Economy
- Website: www.tukes.fi/en/

The Finnish Safety and Chemicals Agency, or Tukes (Finnish: Turvallisuus- ja kemikaalivirasto, previously Turvatekniikan keskus, Swedish: Säkerhets- och kemikalieverket) is an agency within the Ministry of Employment and the Economy of Finland. Its task is to monitor and enforce safety and regulations compliance in technology, chemicals and hazardous materials, workplace safety and consumer and product safety. It is the Member State Competent Authority (MSCA) for the European Union REACH, CLP, BPD and SEVESO III regulations in Finland. However, food, medications and medical safety are governed by different agencies (Evira, Fimea and Valvira, respectively).

Its main divisions are:

- Facilities and mines monitoring
- Products and equipment monitoring
- Support and development services
- Chemical products monitoring
