= Greenpeace Nordic =

Regional Greenpeace organisation

- Type: NGO
- Purpose: Environmentalism, peace
- Headquarters: Stockholm
- Location: Hökens gata 2
- Members: private persons
- Official languages: Danish, Finnish, Norwegian, Swedish
- Executive Director: Mads Flarup Christensen
- Parent organization: Greenpeace

Greenpeace Nordic is a regional branch of the non-governmental international environmental organization Greenpeace. Greenpeace Nordic is registered in Stockholm with offices also in Helsinki, Copenhagen and Oslo.

== Climate change reports ==
The main worldwide Greenpeace energy revolution demands are:

1. Phase out all subsidies for fossil fuels and nuclear energy.
2. Internalise external (social and environmental) costs through 'cap and trade' emissions trading.
3. Mandate strict efficiency standards for all energy consuming appliances, buildings and vehicles.
4. Establish legally binding targets for renewable energy and combined heat and power generation.
5. Reform the electricity markets by guaranteeing priority access to the grid for renewable power generators.
6. Provide defined and stable returns for investors, for example through feed-in tariff payments.
7. Implement better labelling and disclosure mechanisms to provide more environmental product information.
8. Increase research and development budgets for renewable energy and energy efficiency.

=== Finland ===
According to the Greenpeace Energy [R]evolution scenario for Finland in 2012, the final energy demand will decreases by 35% compared to current consumption by 2050. By 2050, 94% of the electricity produced in Finland will come from renewable energy sources. 'New' renewables – mainly wind and PV – will contribute 48% of electricity generation. Already by 2020, the share of renewable electricity production will be 52% and 74% by 2030. The installed capacity of renewables will reach 21 GW in 2030 and 45 GW by 2050. Greenpeace is campaigning against E.ON nuclear project in northern Finland. Greenpeace Nordic activists intercepted a Shell-contracted icebreaker, the Nordica, in May 2012.

=== Sweden ===
According to Greenpeace Sweden, the nuclear accident at Japan's Fukushima Daiichi Nuclear Power Plant will also be seen as a turning point in world energy policy. Germany, Switzerland, and Italy decided to phase out existing reactors and Sweden started discussions about the future of nuclear. Environment minister Andreas Carlgren told in summer 2011: "We want Sweden to be the first country in the world to have an energy system based wholly on renewable energy." By Greenpeace the reduction of our greenhouse gas emissions significantly makes both environmental and economic sense. By 2050, Sweden's entire electricity demand will be produced from renewable sources. A capacity of 56,800 MW will produce 169 TWh/a renewable electricity in 2050.

=== ECtHR case ===
Greenpeace Nordic was one of the organizations involved in the Greenpeace Nordic and Others v. Norway case at the European Court of Human Rights. The Court held that there had been no violation of Article 8. The Court held that when making a decision in the context of the environment and climate change, the State had to carry out an adequate, timely and comprehensive environmental impact assessment in good faith, and based on the best available science. While the processes leading to the 2016 decision in this case had not been fully comprehensive and, in particular, the assessment of the activity’s climate impacts had been deferred, there was no indication that deferring such an assessment had been inherently insufficient to support the State’s guarantees of respect for private and family life within the meaning of the Convention. In terms of admissibility, while the Court accepted the victim status of the associations which brought the case, it did not accept that the individual applicants had victim status since it observed that their claims of climate anxiety or climate grief had not been supported by medical evidence. Even though the Court found no violation, the ruling was welcomed generally welcomed by other NGOs since the Court made clear that future oil and gas projects should assess the global climate impact of these fossil fuel projects – including emissions from combustion, wherever they take place – before the relevant State opens new fields to drilling.
