= Climate Change TV =

Broadcaster dedicated to climate change issues

Climate Change TV is the world’s first online broadcaster dedicated entirely to climate change issues. It contains interviews from heads of state, government officials and negotiators, NGO's, Civil Society and business professionals with a range of views on the climate change negotiations.

It is hosted by Responding to Climate Change (RTCC), an NGO and Official Observer to the United Nations Framework Convention on Climate Change (UNFCCC).

RTCC provides a daily news and analysis service following latest developments in climate policy, research and other aspects of the climate debate. The Studio is run for the UNFCCC at the annual COP. The interviews are hosted on RTCC and the UNFCCC's studio portal.

It provides for one-on-one video interviews with a wide array of stakeholders from civil society, intergovernmental organizations and party delegates. Climate Change TV provides a platform for discussing the effects of climate change, causes of global warming and possible solutions.

At COP17, held in December 2011, the Climate Change TV Studio was visited by UNFCCC Chief Executive Christiana Figueres, lead Netherlands negotiator Maas Goote, and UK Minister for energy and climate change Greg Barker, along with members of Oxfam and 350.org.
