= Confederation of Finnish Industries =

Employers' association in Finland

- Elinkeinoelämän keskusliitto
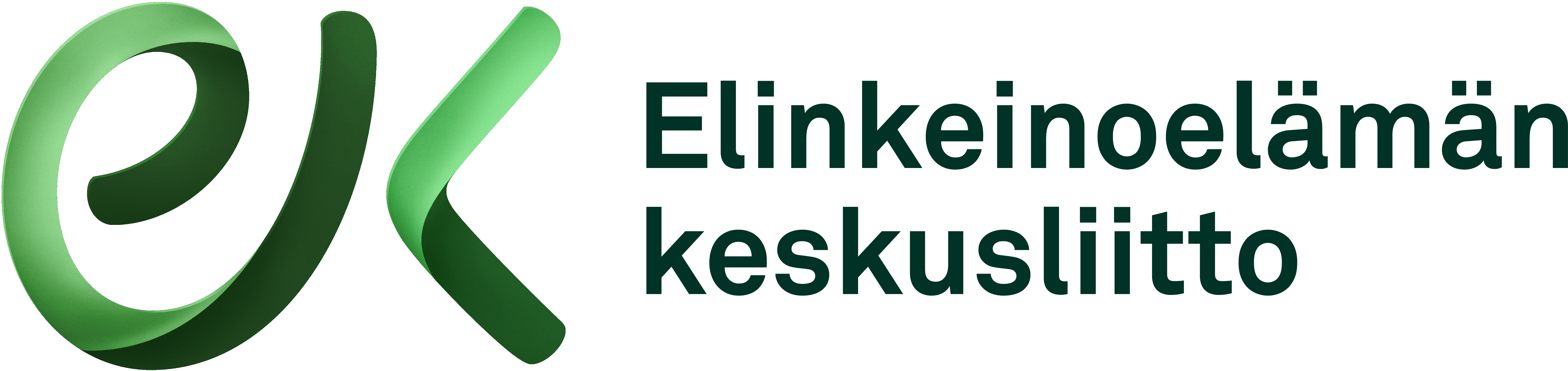
- Abbreviation: EK
- Formation: 1907; 118 years ago
- Type: Employers' organization
- Headquarters: Helsinki
- CEO: Jyri Häkämies
- Board Chair: Aaro Cantell

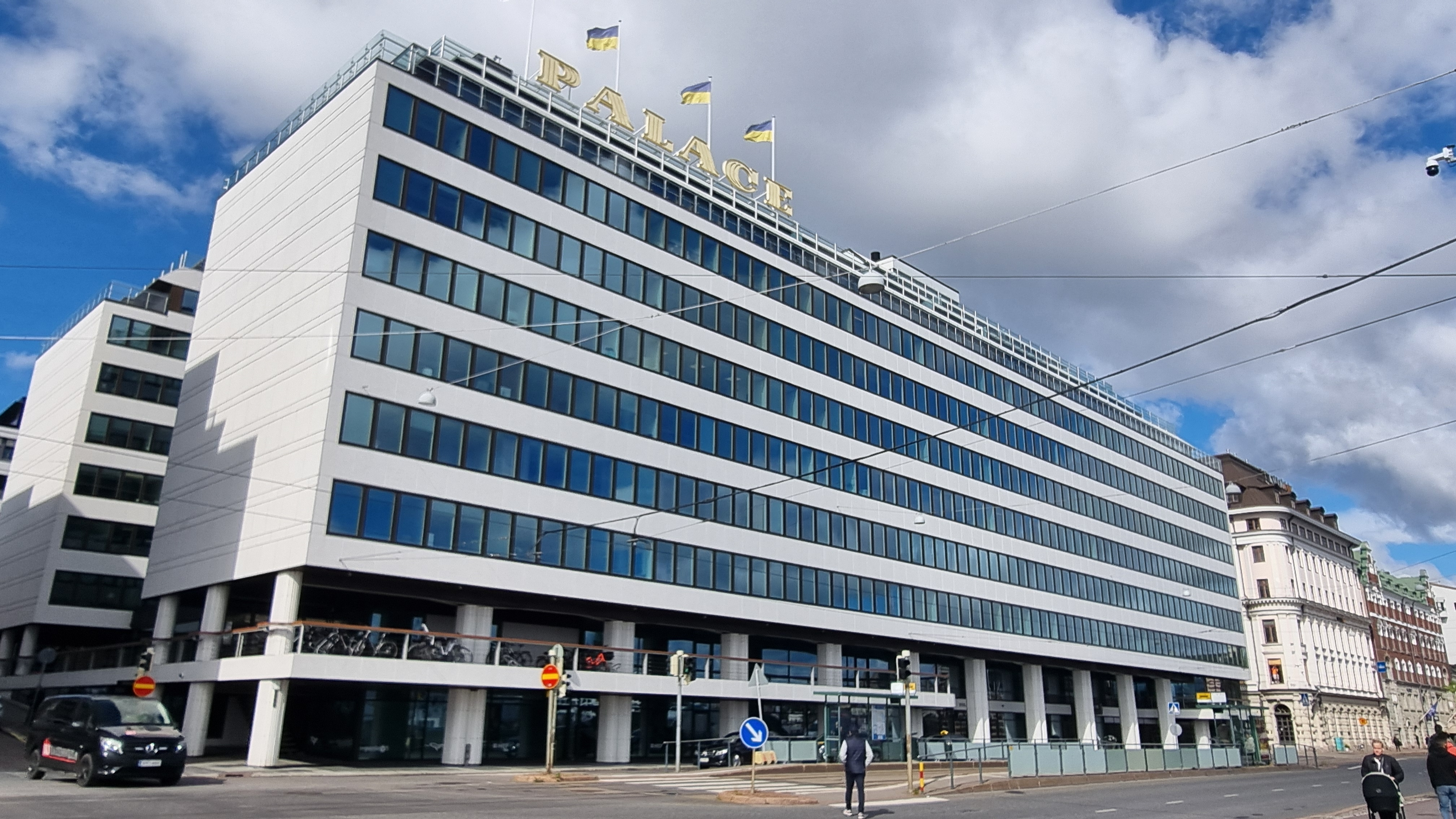
The House of Industries at Eteläranta 10 in Helsinki

The Confederation of Finnish Industries (EK, Finnish: Elinkeinoelämän Keskusliitto, Swedish: Finlands Näringsliv) is the largest employers' association in Finland.

== History ==
The history of the Confederation of Finnish Industries dates back to 1907, when employers established the General Employers' Confederation of Finland (Suomen Yleinen Työantajaliitto) during the era of the Grand Duchy of Finland. At that time, the General Employers' Confederation functioned mainly as a sort of employers' club.

The Russian Revolution of 1917, the collapse of the Russian Empire, and Finland's independence in 1917 changed the nature of the confederation. As a result, in 1918, its name was changed to the Central Association of Finnish Employers (Suomen Työnantajain Keskusliitto).

The Central Association of Finnish Employers gained a new headquarters in 1952, when the House of Industries, designed by architect Viljo Revell, was completed for the 1952 Helsinki Summer Olympics. The building also housed the award-winning Palace Restaurant.

The Central Association of Finnish Employers and the Central Association of Industry (Teollisuusliitto), founded in 1976, merged in 1992. The associations formed the Central Association of Industry and Employers (TT - Teollisuuden ja Työnantajain Keskusliitto).

EK focuses its activity on the following goals:

- A business environment which stimulates growth and success for companies
- Securing the competitiveness of Finnish work
- Ways to benefit from the opportunities offered by globalisation
- Economic policies promoting competitiveness
- Efficient member services

The organisation consists of:

- 17 branch associations
- About 15,000 member companies, 96% of which are small and medium enterprises (SMEs)
- About 900,000 employees

== See also ==
- House of Industries
- Market Square
- Finnfacts, Finnish media organisation
