= Ankkarock =

Finnish rock and metal festival

Coordinates: 60°21′21″N 025°04′24″E

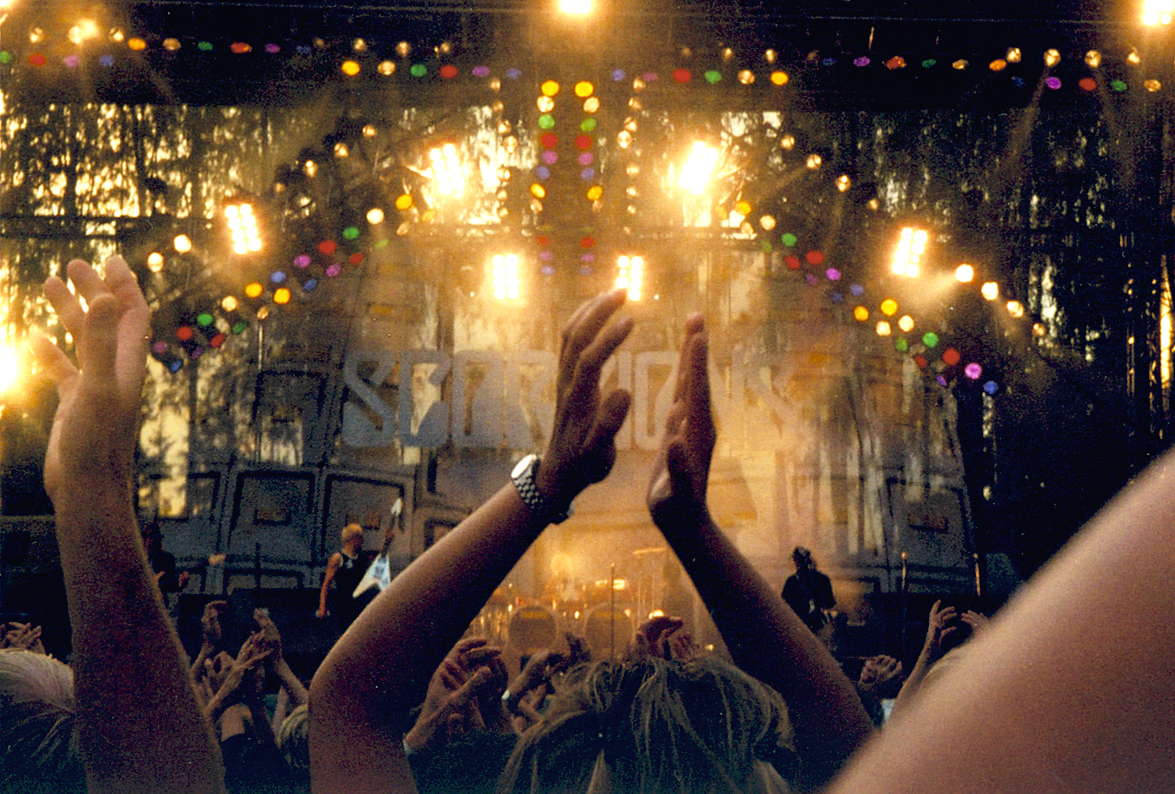
- Genre: Rock, metal
- Dates: June
- Locations: Vantaa, Finland
- Years active: 1987 – 2010
- Website: Ankkarock.fi

Ankkarock was a Finnish rock and metal festival held annually in Korso, Vantaa, in the Greater Helsinki area. It literally translates into Duckrock. The first Ankkarock was held in 1987. The festival was free of charge until 1998.

In 2006, the two-day event attracted approximately 40,000 visitors. The 2007 festival took place on 4–5 August. The final event was in 2010.

== Lineups ==
=== 2009 ===
Held on 1–2 August.

==== August 1 ====
- Cavalera Conspiracy
- Turbonegro
- New York Dolls
- DragonForce
- Tehosekoitin
- Hardcore Superstar
- Maija Vilkkumaa
- Egotrippi
- Ensiferum
- Stamina
- Tuomo
- CMX
- Scandinavian Music Group
- Ankanpoikarock-voittajat

==== August 2 ====
- Sonata Arctica
- Volbeat
- TV on the Radio
- The National
- Eppu Normaali
- Amon Amarth
- Testament
- Fucked Up
- Amorphis
- Apulanta
- Kotiteollisuus
- Le Corps mince de Francoise
- Pintandwefall
- PMMP
- Turisas
- Ankanpoikarock-voittajat

=== 2008 ===
Held on 2 August and 3 August

==== August 2 ====
- Hanoi Rocks
- Tiger Army
- Kent
- The Hives
- HIM

==== August 3 ====
- Apulanta
- Volbeat
- Soilwork
- Apocalyptica
- Opeth

=== 2007 ===
Held on 4 August and 5 August.

==== August 4 ====
- The Sounds
- The Gathering
- Leningrad
- Apulanta
- Zen Café
- Hanoi Rocks
- Maija Vilkkumaa
- Von Hertzen Brothers
- Rubik
- Maj Karma
- Poisonblack

==== August 5 ====
- Dir En Grey
- The Ark
- Millencolin
- Mando Diao
- The 69 Eyes
- Disco Ensemble
- PMMP
- Lapko
- Amorphis
- Sonata Arctica
- Poets of the Fall
- Damn Seagulls
- Nine Inch Nails

=== 2006 ===
Held on 5 August and 6 August.

==== August 5 ====
- Dropkick Murphys
- Opeth
- Danko Jones
- Amorphis
- CKY featuring Bam Margera
- Disco Ensemble
- a diet.
- PMMP
- Hanoi Rocks
- Apulanta
- Don Johnson Big Band
- Sonata Arctica
- Timo Rautiainen
- Mokoma
- Eläkeläiset
- Lemonator
- Mirror of Madness
- Ankanpoikarock-voittajat

==== August 6 ====
- Ministry
- Turbonegro
- Children of Bodom
- Backyard Babies
- Flogging Molly
- The Rasmus
- Egotrippi
- Lapko
- Tiktak
- Poets of the Fall
- Scandinavian Music Group
- Teräsbetoni
- Maija Vilkkumaa
- No Shame
- Von Hertzen Brothers
- Ankanpoikarock-voittajat

Lineups from pre-2006 include such artists as:

- Juliette & The Licks
- The Soundtrack Of Our Lives
- The Posies
- Franz Ferdinand
- The Cardigans
- The Darkness
- The Hellacopters
- HIM
- Scorpions
- Motörhead
- Nightwish
- Uriah Heep
