= Paula Vesala =

Finnish singer-songwriter

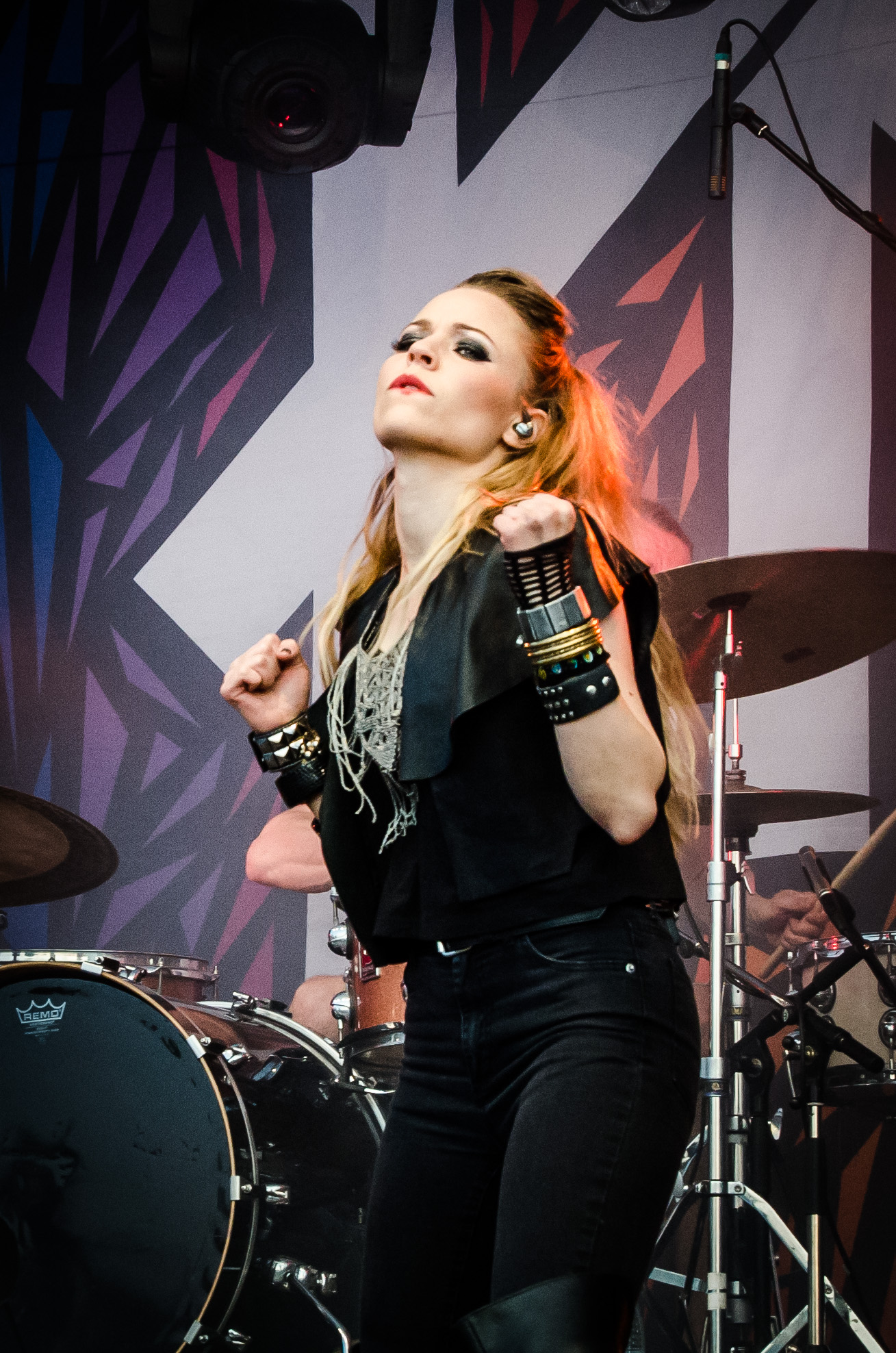
- Paula Vesala performing at Lappeenrannan Yöt 2013

Background information
- Also known as: Vesala
- Born: Paula Julia Vesala; 10 December 1981 (age 44); Kärsämäki, Finland
- Genres: Pop; pop rock
- Occupations: Singer; songwriter
- Instruments: Vocals; violin; guitar; piano
- Years active: 2002–present
- Labels: Sony Finland; Etenee Records
- Member of: PMMP
- Formerly of: Kerkko Koskinen Kollektiivi

Paula Julia Vesala (born December 10, 1981) is a Finnish singer-songwriter. She was one of two singers and main lyricist in the pop rock duo PMMP along with Mira Luoti. Her solo career began in 2015 under the stage name Vesala. She has composed songs for other well-known Finnish artists such as Vesa-Matti Loiri, Jenni Vartiainen, and Antti Tuisku.

== Career ==
=== Education ===
Vesala attended the Sibelius Academy in Helsinki, where she studied music education and classical singing as well as the piano and violin. Since 2011, she has studied dramaturgy at the Helsinki Theatre Academy and later at University of California, Los Angeles. Her 10-minute play "English Lesson" was chosen among seven others as one of the best in the national Theater Masters 10-minute playwriting competition.

- Pohjois-Savon Ammattikorkeakoulu (Savonia Polytechinc) Music Pedagogy / major: classical singing 2000 – 2002
- Sibelius Academy: Department: Music Education / major: music education 2002 – 2011
- The Helsinki Theatre Academy: Dramaturgy degree program / major: dramaturgy and playwriting 2011 – 2014
- UCLA-University of California, Los Angeles in MFA Playwriting program at TFT (School of Theater, Film and Television) 2014 – 2017

=== PMMP (2002–2013) ===
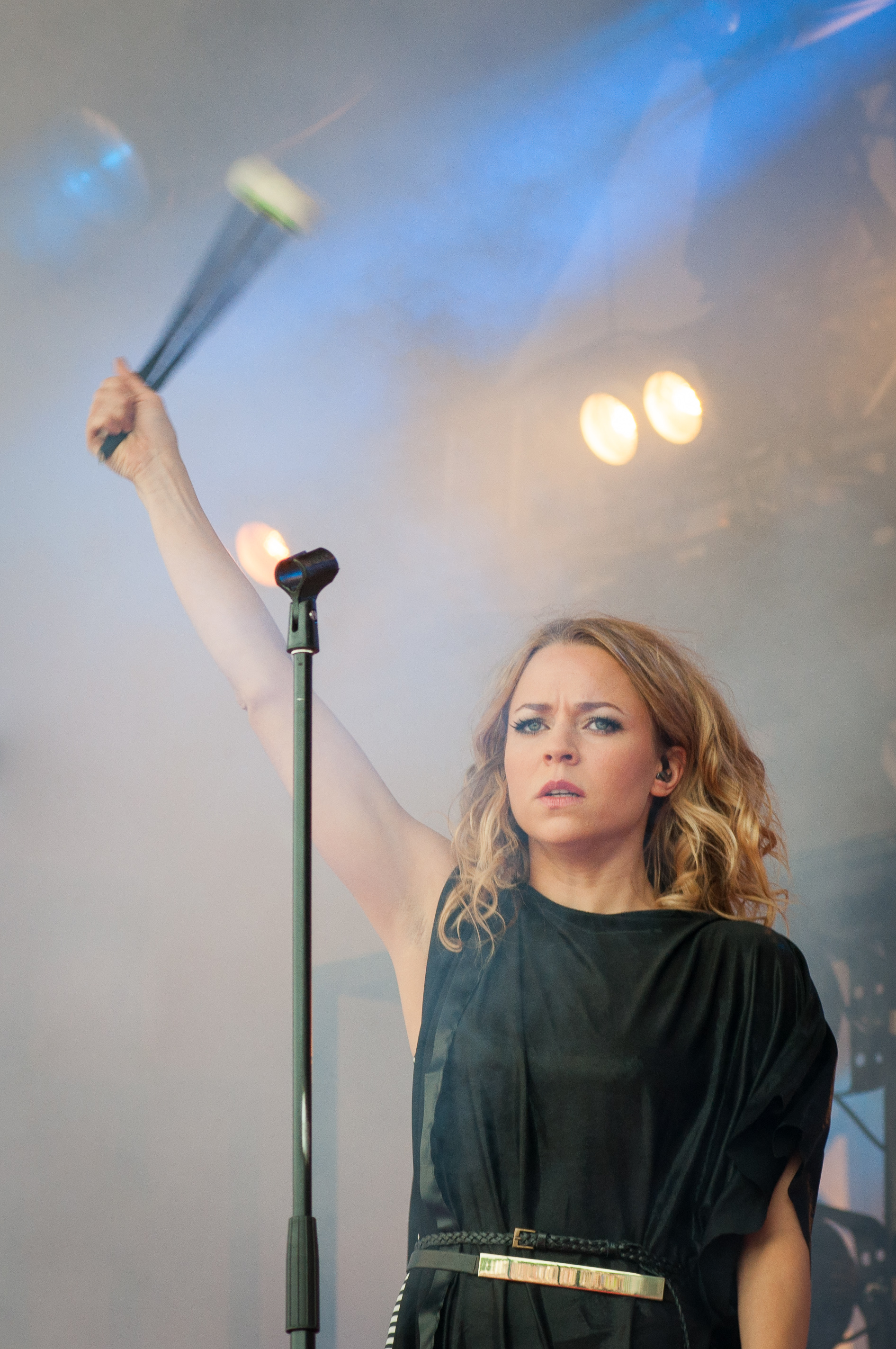
Paula Vesala, Ilosaarirock 2012

PMMP was a Finnish band fronted by singers Paula Vesala and Mira Luoti and backed by musicians Mikko Virta, Juho Vehmanen and Heikki Kytölä. PMMP has been called one of the biggest and most important bands of the 2000s, as the band had a huge impact on the music scene in Finland. PMMP's albums were produced by Jori Sjöroos, who also wrote the music for all songs. The lyrics are written by Paula and Mira, mostly Paula. The name of the band is often said to be an abbreviation of the phrase "Paulan ja Miran Molemmat Puolet" (both sides of Paula and Mira). In an interview on Finnish talk show Krisse Show, they stated that the name of the band is derived from the names of its members: Paula, Mira, Mira, Paula, similarly to ABBA.

PMMP first became well known in Finland for the 2003 summer hit Rusketusraidat (Tan Lines). They then enjoyed great success with their second album Kovemmat kädet (Rougher Hands), which went gold (double platinum in 2010). An extended version of the album was released in August 2005. Oo siellä jossain mun, a single from the aforementioned album, is PMMP's biggest hit so far in Finland.

In November 2006, PMMP released their third album Leskiäidin tyttäret (Daughters of a widowed mother), which went platinum on the day it was released.

They released an album labeled Puuhevonen (Wooden Horse) featuring contemporary takes on traditional children's songs in 2007, around the time their first children were born. In 2009, they released their fourth rock/pop album Veden varaan (Overboard, or Afloat) and their fifth album Rakkaudesta (Out of love, or About love) was released in 2012.

The band was an acclaimed live act. PMMP played their final concert on October 27, 2013, at the Helsinki Ice Hall which, along with an additional show on the night before, sold out within the first minutes after ticket sales opened.

In 2013, PMMP was awarded by the Ministry of Education and Culture in Helsinki with the Finland Prize. The Prize gives recognition to important figures in the Finnish cultural landscape across widely varying fields. The pop-duo were "commended for offering new role models for young women."

=== Awards ===
PMMP has won a total of nine Finnish Grammys. The categories are:

- 2003 – Pop-rock newcomer
- 2005 – Album of the year Kovemmat kädet (Rougher Hands), Pop album Kovemmat kädet and Best band
- 2006 – Album of the year Leskiäidin tyttäret (Daughters of a widowed mother) and Pop album Leskiäidin tyttäret
- 2009 – Album of the year Veden varaan (Overboard, or Afloat), Rock album Veden varaan and Best band

=== Solo career (2015–present) ===
In October 2015, Paula Vesala announced that in the future she would make music under the stage name Vesala. Her first single "Tequila", written and composed by her, was released on October 23, 2015, and her first solo album on June 17, 2016. The album sold platinum in just over a month.

=== As a lyricist and composer ===
Paula Vesala has composed and written songs for other artists such as Johanna Kurkela, Jenni Vartiainen, Vesa-Matti Loiri, Martti Saarinen, Katri Ylander, Tiktak, Petra Gargano, Antti Tuisku, Anna Abreu, Uusi Fantasia, Freeman, Katri Helena, Jippu, Samuli Edelmann, Stig, Jesse Kaikuranta and Aṣa. She has composed music for Finnish theater, including for the play Neljäs Tie directed by Esa Leskinen shown at the Finnish National Theatre in 2013. In 2016, she received the Juha Vainio Award, an annual award given to a significant Finnish lyricist. Vesala was the 26th person and the 5th woman to receive the award.

=== As an actress ===
Vesala acted in a silent film called Myrsk (Tempest) by director Elina Oikari at TaiK in 2013, playing the role of Prince Ferdinand. She has provided the Finnish voice for several movies including Tinker Bell, Happily N'Ever After, Arthur and the Minimoys, High School Musical 1, 2 and 3. She translated Benny Andersson's, Lars Rudolfsson's and Björn Ulvaeus' musical Kristina från Duvemåla, and the ABBA songs in the musical Mamma Mia! from Swedish to Finnish for Svenska Teatern.

=== Other projects ===
==== Kerkko Koskinen Kollektiivi ====
Kerkko Koskinen Kollektiivi (Kollektiivi for short) is a Finnish band formed by Kerkko Koskinen (Ultra Bra) with Vuokko Hovatta (Ultra Bra), Paula Vesala (PMMP) and Manna. In January 2014, Paula Vesala informed that she had left the group. She was replaced by Maija Vilkkumaa.

Kollektiivi has released two albums, Kerkko Koskinen Kollektiivi (which won the Finnish gold record music prize) in 2012 and 2 in 2014.

==== Vain elämää ====
In 2014, Paula Vesala took part in the 3rd season of Vain elämää with Samuli Edelmann, Elastinen, Paula Koivuniemi, Vesa-Matti Loiri, Jenni Vartiainen, and Toni Wirtanen. The season aired from September 19, 2014, to November 7, 2014. At the end of the 3rd season, the compilation album Vain Elämää – Kausi 3 (ilta) was released under the label WEA / Warner. The album topped the Finnish Albums Chart. The compilation album Vain Elämää – Kausi 3 (päivä) that reached number two in Finnish Albums Chart was released.

== Personal life ==
Paula Vesala is from the Finnish town of Kärsämäki. On November 8, 2014, Paula Vesala married her longtime partner Lauri Ylönen, the lead singer of The Rasmus in Las Vegas; the couple filed a marriage statement on December 29, 2014, and the marriage was registered in Helsinki on January 5, 2015. They have a son Julius, who was born in April 2008. The family moved to Los Angeles in Autumn 2014. On September 26, 2016, the couple announced their divorce after a 12-year relationship through an official statement.

== Discography ==
=== Albums ===
With PMMP
Year	Album	Peak position	Certification
2003	Kuulkaas enot!: Released: 5 September 2003; Record label: BMG	6	Platinum
2005	Kovemmat kädet: Released: 9 March 2005; Record label: Sony BMG; Also special release Kovemmat kädet (Kumipainos)	2	2× platinum
2006	Leskiäidin tyttäret: Released: 15 November 2006; Record label: Sony BMG	1	Platinum
2007	Puuhevonen: Released: 14 November 2007; Record label: Sony BMG	3	Platinum
2009	Veden varaan: Released: 25 November 2009; Record label: Sony Music	1	Platinum
2012	Rakkaudesta: Released: 11 June 2012; Record label: Sony Music	1	Gold
2013	Hitit: Released: December 2013; Record label: Sony Music	16	

Paula Vesala & Pekka Kuusisto
Year	Album	Peak positions
Year	Album	FIN
2011	Kiestinki (with Pekka Kuusisto)	12

Kerkko Koskinen Kollektiivi
Year	Album	Peak positions
Year	Album	FIN
2012	Kerkko Koskinen Kollektiivi	10

Vesala
Year	Album	Peak position	Certification
2016	Vesala: Released: 17 June 2016; Record label: Etenee, Warner	1	Platinum
2023	Näkemiin, melankolia: Released: 10 February 2023; Record label: Etenee, Warner	1	

=== Singles ===
Vesala
Title	Year	Peak positions	Album
Title	Year	FIN	Album
"Tequila"	2015	4	Vesala
"Tytöt ei soita kitaraa"	2016	—	Vesala
"Älä droppaa mun tunnelmaa"	2016	5	Vesala
"Pahanilmanlinnut"	2021	10	Näkemiin, melankolia
"Uu Mama"	2022	12	Näkemiin, melankolia
"Nopee Hopee" (with Kaija Koo)	2022	19	Non-album single
"Miks pitää itkeä" (featuring Aali)	2023	17	Näkemiin, melankolia
"Kipee" (with Olavi Uusivirta)	2026	28	Non-album single

With PMMP
Name	Year	Peak positions				Certification	Album
Name	Year	Single list	Download list	Radio list	50 Hits	Certification	Album
"Rusketusraidat"	2003	1	–	11	2	Gold	Kuulkaas enot!
"Niina"	2003	–	–	–	42		Kuulkaas enot!
"Joutsenet"	2003	8	7	–	8		Kuulkaas enot!
"Kesä-95"	2003	–	–	–	–		Kuulkaas enot!
"Päiväkoti"	2005	13	–	–	38		Kovemmat kädet
"Kovemmat kädet"	2005	–	—	—	—		Kovemmat kädet
"Oo siellä jossain mun"	2005	–	16	6	7		Kovemmat kädet
"Kumivirsi" YleX:n Kesäkumibiisi	2005	–	–	–	–		Kovemmat kädet – Kumivirsi edition
"Pikkuveli"	2005	–	–	1	2		Kovemmat kädet – Kumivirsi edition
"Matkalaulu"	2005	–	–	7	3		Kovemmat kädet
"Henkilökohtaisesti"	2006	–	–	1	2		Leskiäidin tyttäret
"Tässä elämä on"	2007	–	4	1	2		Leskiäidin tyttäret
"Joku raja"	2007	1	16	20	4		Leskiäidin tyttäret
"Kesäkaverit"	2007	–	–	–	47		Leskiäidin tyttäret
"Kiitos"	2007	–	—	—	—		Leskiäidin tyttäret
"Täti Monika"	2007	–	–	–	–		Puuhevonen
"Viimeinen valitusvirsi"	2009	12	11	–	–		Veden varaan
"Lautturi"	2009	4	4	1	–	Gold	Veden varaan
"Pariterapiaa"	2009	12	19	19	–		Veden varaan
"Lapsuus loppui"	2009	–	–	9	–		Veden varaan
"Heliumpallo"	2012	–	11	11	–		Rakkaudesta
"Rakkaalleni"	2012	–	25	1	–		Rakkaudesta
"Tytöt"	2012	–	–	–	–		Rakkaudesta
"Pahvinaamari"	2012	–	–	–	–		Rakkaudesta
"Valloittamaton"	2013	–	8	–	–		Hitit

Various appearances
Year	Title	Peak positions	Album
Year	Title	FIN	Album
2014	"Sori"	1	Vain Elämää, Season 3, Elastinen Day
2014	"Miten ja miksi"	10	Vain Elämää, Season 3, Samuli Edelmann Day
2014	"Sua vasten aina painautuisin"	19	Vain Elämää, Season 3, Paula Koivuniemi Day

== Filmography ==
=== Films ===
Year	Movie	Role
2010	Princess	nurse Elsa
2012	Naked Harbour	music teacher
2012	3 Simoa	Eeva, single parent
2016	Little Wing	Siru Miettinen
2017	The Unknown Soldier	Lyyti Rokka
2020	Games People Play (Seurapeli)	Ulla
2023	Comeback	

=== TV Series ===
Year	Show	Role
2014	#lovemilla	TV-Gitta
2014	Angry Birds Stella	Gale (voice)

=== Animation films ===
Year	Movie	Role
2006	Asterix and the Vikings	Abba
2006	High School Musical	Taylor McKessie
2006	Happily N'Ever After	Ella / Tuhkimo
2006	Brother Bear 2	Nita
2006	Arthur and the Minimoys	Selenia
2007	High School Musical 2	Taylor McKessie
2008	Tinker Bell	Tinker Bell
2008	High School Musical 3: Senior Year	Taylor McKessie
2008	Disco Worms	Gloria
2008	Bolt	Penny
2009	Cloudy with a Chance of Meatballs	Sam Sparks
2010	Konferenz der Tiere	Bonnie
2011	The Magic Crystal	Jaga
2012	Tinker Bell: Secret of the Wings	Tinker Bell
2013	Cloudy with a Chance of Meatballs 2	Sam Sparks
2013	Lotte and the Moonstone Secret	Lotte
2014	Tinker Bell and The Pirate Fairy	Tinker Bell
2014	Planes: Fire & Rescue	Dynamite
2014	Tinker Bell and the Legend of the NeverBeast	Tinker Bell

== Bibliography ==
- Vesala, Paula; Mira Luoti; Hanna Ylönen; Pasi Kostiainen (2008). PMMP. LIKE. ISBN 978-952-01-0066-7.
