= Joel Melasniemi =

Finnish musician (born 1975)

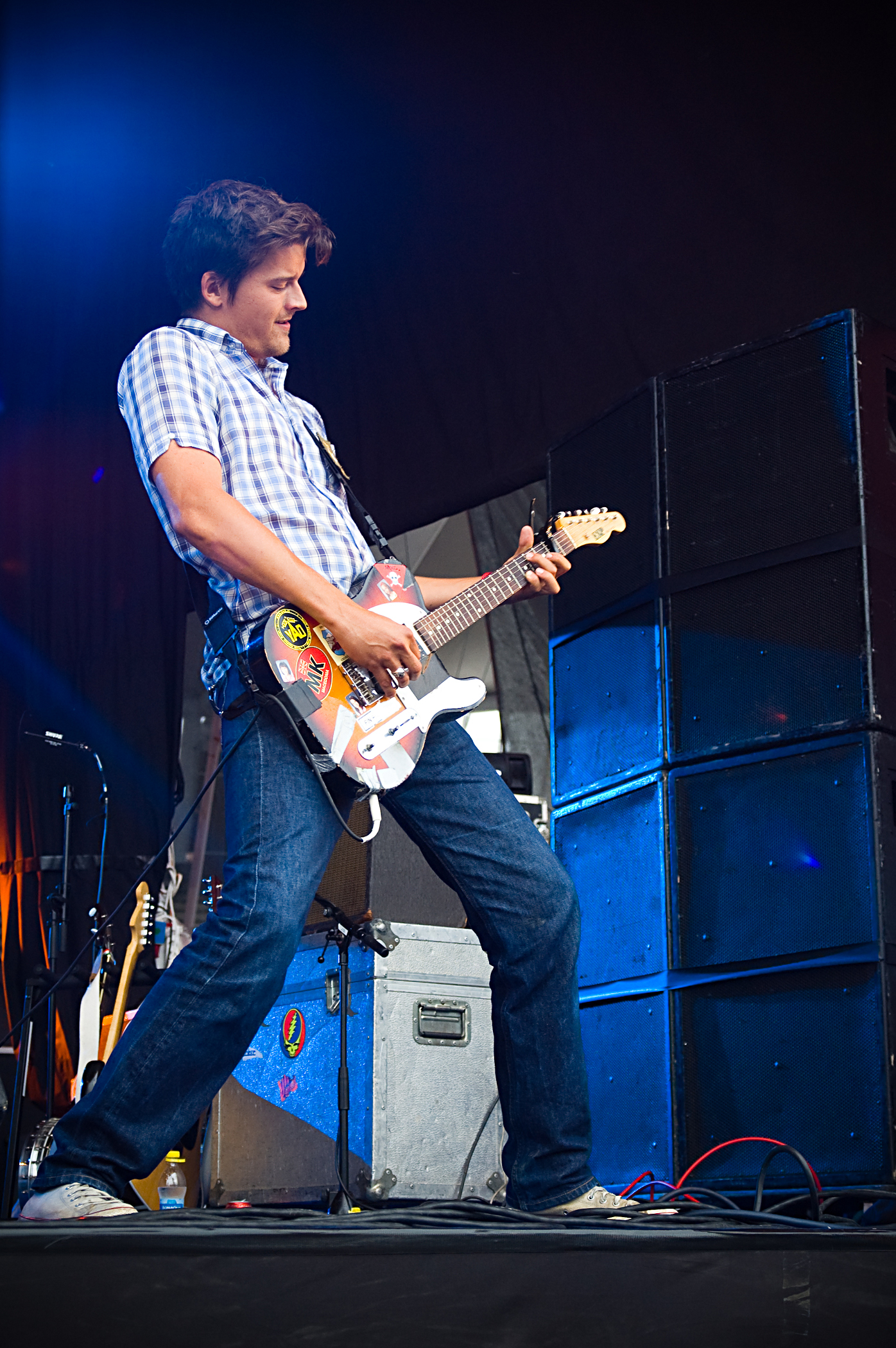

Joel Melasniemi (born January 19, 1975) is a Finnish musician. He played guitar in the Finnish band Ultra Bra. He is currently the lead composer for Scandinavian Music Group, and also plays guitar and banjo in the band.
