= Tuula Haatainen =

Finnish politician (born 1960)

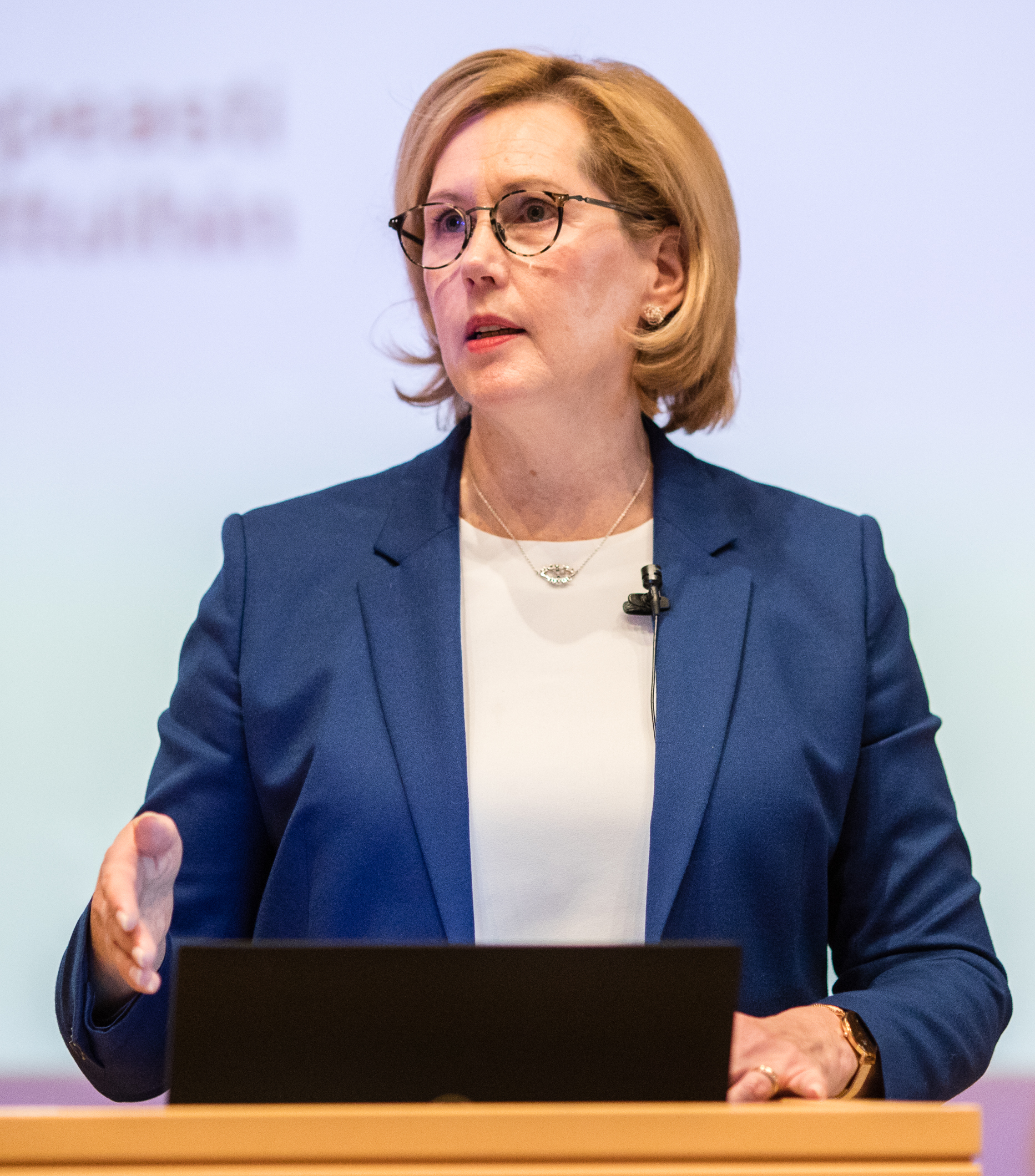
- Haatainen in 2020

Minister of Employment
- In office 10 December 2019 – 20 June 2023
- Prime Minister: Sanna Marin
- Preceded by: Timo Harakka
- Succeeded by: Arto Satonen

Deputy Speaker of the Finnish Parliament
- In office 7 June 2019 – 10 December 2019
- Speaker: Matti Vanhanen
- Preceded by: Juho Eerola
- Succeeded by: Antti Rinne

Minister of Social Affairs and Health
- In office 23 September 2005 – 19 April 2007
- Prime Minister: Matti Vanhanen
- Preceded by: Sinikka Mönkäre
- Succeeded by: Liisa Hyssälä

Minister of Education
- In office 17 April 2003 – 23 September 2005
- Prime Minister: Anneli Jäätteenmäki; Matti Vanhanen
- Preceded by: Maija-Liisa Rask
- Succeeded by: Antti Kalliomäki

Personal details
- Born: 11 February 1960 (age 66) Tuusniemi, Northern Savonia, Finland
- Party: Social Democratic
- Spouse: Janne Metsämäki
- Website: Official website

Tuula Irmeli Haatainen (born 11 February 1960) is a Finnish politician and a member of the Finnish Parliament, with the Social Democratic Party. She was the Minister of Education 2003–2005 and the Minister of Social Affairs and Health 2005–2007.

In 2007 Haatainen was chosen as the Deputy Mayor of Helsinki and she left the parliament. She returned to the parliament following the 2015 elections, in which she received 6,662 personal votes.

On 2 September 2017, Haatainen was nominated as the candidate of the Social Democratic Party in 2018 presidential election. In the election, Haatainen placed sixth with 3.3 percent of the votes, while the incumbent president Sauli Niinistö went on to secure his second term with a majority of votes.

After the presidential election, on 5 February 2018, Haatainen was elected as the Second Deputy Speaker of the Parliament. She served in the position until the collapse of Rinne Cabinet in December 2019, after which she joined the subsequent Marin Cabinet as Minister of Employment. She is a trained nurse and has practised in her home region of Northern Savonia, and in Åland.

== Honors ==
- Legion of Honour (France, 2019)
