= Matias Marttinen =

Finnish politician

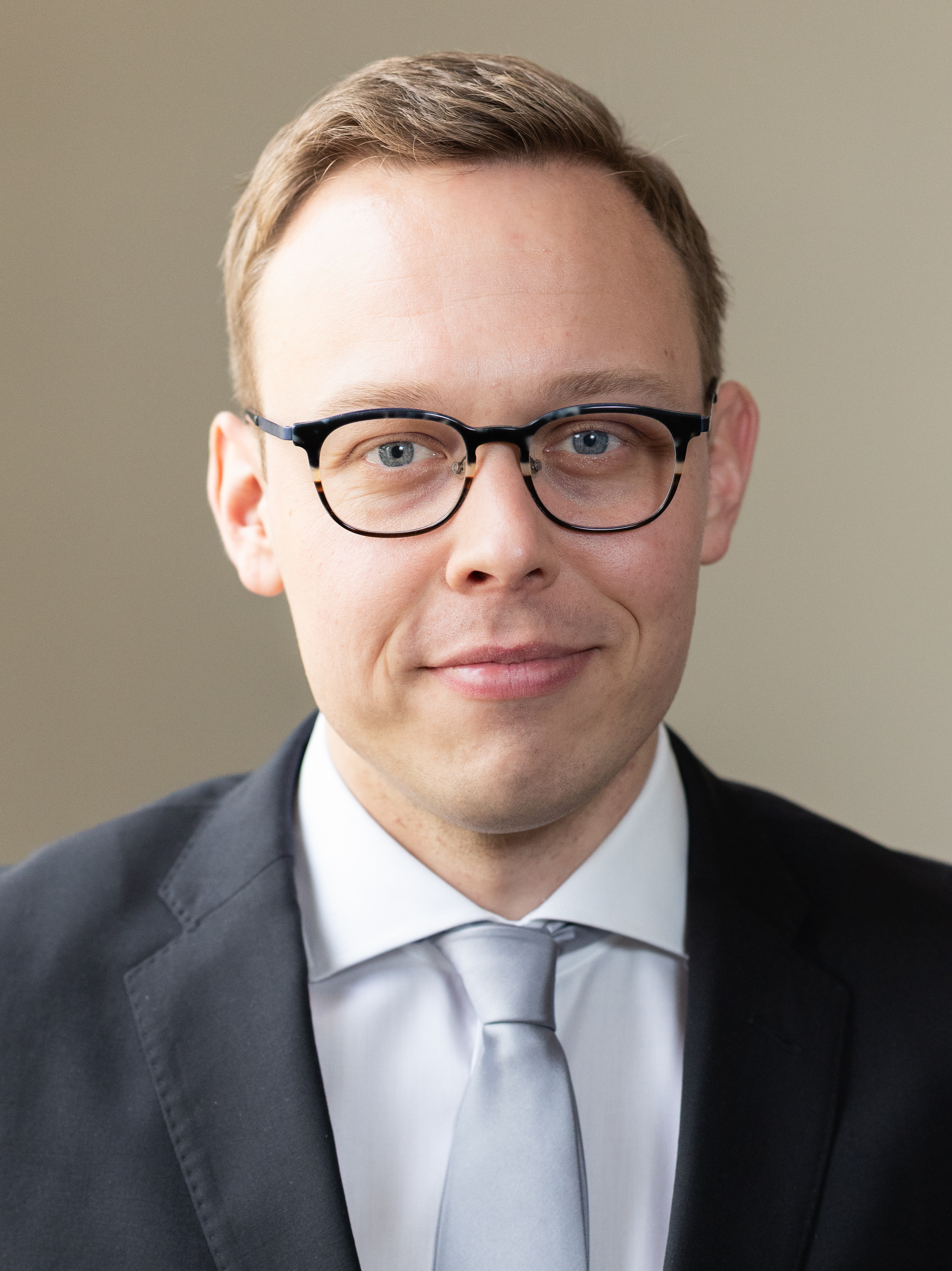
- Marttinen in 2023

Minister of Employment
- Incumbent
- Assumed office 6 May 2025
- Prime Minister: Petteri Orpo
- Preceded by: Arto Satonen

Member of Parliament for Satakunta
- Incumbent
- Assumed office 17 April 2019

Personal details
- Born: 25 June 1990 (age 36) Rauma, Satakunta, Finland
- Party: National Coalition Party

Matias Marttinen (born 25 June 1990 in Rauma) is a Finnish politician currently serving in the Parliament of Finland for the National Coalition Party at the Satakunta constituency. He has served as minister of employment since 2025.

== Political career ==
He was appointed minister of employment on 6 May 2025, succeeding Arto Satonen.
