= Minister of Employment (Finland) =

Finnish cabinet position

- Suomen työministeri
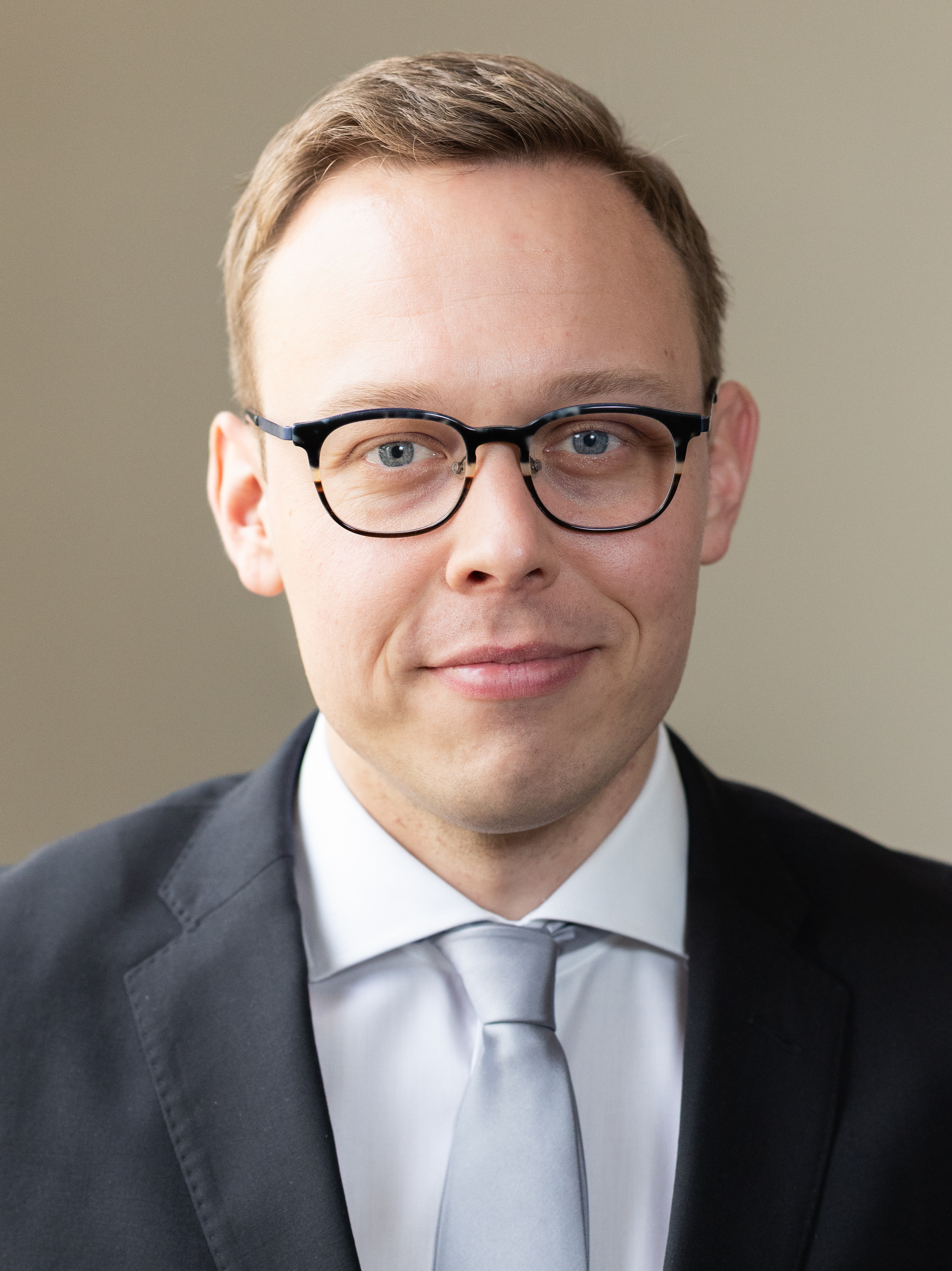
- Incumbent; Matias Marttinen since 6 May 2025
- Appointer: President of Finland
- Formation: 1 March 1970; 56 years ago
- First holder: Veikko Helle

The minister of employment (Finnish: työministeri, Swedish: arbetsminister) is one of the Finnish Government's ministerial positions. Along with the minister of economic affairs, the minister of employment is located at the Ministry of Economic Affairs and Employment.

== List of ministers of labor and employment ==
| No. | Portrait | Minister | Took office | Left office | Time in office | Party | Cabinet |
|---|---|---|---|---|---|---|---|
| 1 | Veikko Helle | Veikko Helle (1911–2005) | 1 March 1970 | 14 May 1970 | 74 days | SDP | Koivisto I |
| 2 | Esa Timonen | Esa Timonen (1925–2015) | 14 May 1970 | 15 July 1970 | 62 days | Independent | Aura I |
| (1) | Veikko Helle | Veikko Helle (1911–2005) | 15 July 1970 | 29 October 1971 | 1 year, 106 days | SDP | Aura I Karjalainen II |
| 3 | Keijo Liinamaa | Keijo Liinamaa (1929–1980) | 29 October 1971 | 23 February 1972 | 117 days | Independent | Aura II |
| (1) | Veikko Helle | Veikko Helle (1911–2005) | 23 February 1972 | 4 September 1972 | 194 days | SDP | Paasio II |
| 4 | Valde Nevalainen | Valde Nevalainen (1919–1994) | 4 September 1972 | 13 June 1975 | 2 years, 282 days | SDP | Sorsa I |
| 5 | Ilmo Paananen | Ilmo Paananen (1927–2014) | 13 June 1975 | 30 November 1975 | 170 days | Independent | Liinamaa |
| 6 | Paavo Aitio | Paavo Aitio (1918–1989) | 30 November 1975 | 29 September 1976 | 304 days | SKDL | Miettunen II |
| 7 | Paavo Väyrynen | Paavo Väyrynen (born 1946) | 29 September 1976 | 15 May 1977 | 228 days | Centre | Miettunen III |
| 8 | Arvo Aalto | Arvo Aalto (1932–2025) | 15 May 1977 | 20 March 1981 | 3 years, 309 days | SKDL | Sorsa II; Koivisto II |
| 9 | Jouko Kajanoja | Jouko Kajanoja (born 1942) | 20 March 1981 | 31 December 1982 | 1 year, 286 days | SKDL | Koivisto II; Sorsa III |
| (1) | Veikko Helle | Veikko Helle (1911–2005) | 31 December 1982 | 6 May 1983 | 126 days | SDP | Sorsa III |
| 10 | Urpo Leppänen | Urpo Leppänen (1944–2010) | 6 May 1983 | 30 April 1987 | 3 years, 359 days | Rural Party | Sorsa IV |
| 11 | Matti Puhakka | Matti Puhakka (1945–2021) | 30 April 1987 | 26 April 1991 | 3 years, 361 days | SDP | Holkeri |
| 12 | Ilkka Kanerva | Ilkka Kanerva (1948–2022) | 26 April 1991 | 13 April 1995 | 3 years, 352 days | National Coalition | Aho |
| 13 | Liisa Jaakonsaari | Liisa Jaakonsaari (born 1945) | 13 April 1995 | 15 April 1999 | 4 years, 2 days | SDP | Lipponen I |
| 14 | Sinikka Mönkäre | Sinikka Mönkäre (born 1947) | 15 April 1999 | 25 February 2000 | 316 days | SDP | Lipponen II |
| 15 | Tarja Filatov | Tarja Filatov (born 1963) | 25 February 2000 | 19 April 2007 | 7 years, 53 days | SDP | Lipponen II; Jäätteenmäki; Vanhanen I |
| 16 | Tarja Cronberg | Tarja Cronberg (born 1943) | 19 April 2007 | 26 June 2009 | 2 years, 68 days | Green | Vanhanen II |
| 17 | Anni Sinnemäki | Anni Sinnemäki (born 1973) | 26 June 2009 | 22 June 2011 | 1 year, 361 days | Green | Vanhanen II; Kiviniemi |
| 18 | Lauri Ihalainen | Lauri Ihalainen (born 1947) | 22 June 2011 | 29 May 2015 | 3 years, 341 days | SDP | Katainen; Stubb |
| 19 | Jari Lindström | Jari Lindström (born 1965) | 29 May 2015 | 6 June 2019 | 4 years, 8 days | Finns | Sipilä |
| 20 | Timo Harakka | Timo Harakka (born 1962) | 6 June 2019 | 10 December 2019 | 187 days | SDP | Rinne |
| 21 | Tuula Haatainen | Tuula Haatainen (born 1960) | 10 December 2019 | 20 June 2023 | 6 years, 271 days | SDP | Marin |
| 22 | Arto Satonen | Arto Satonen (born 1966) | 20 June 2023 | 6 May 2025 | 3 years, 79 days | National Coalition | Orpo |
| 23 | Matias Marttinen | Matias Marttinen (born 1990) | 6 May 2025 | Incumbent | 1 year, 124 days | National Coalition | Orpo |
