= Timo Harakka =

Finnish politician

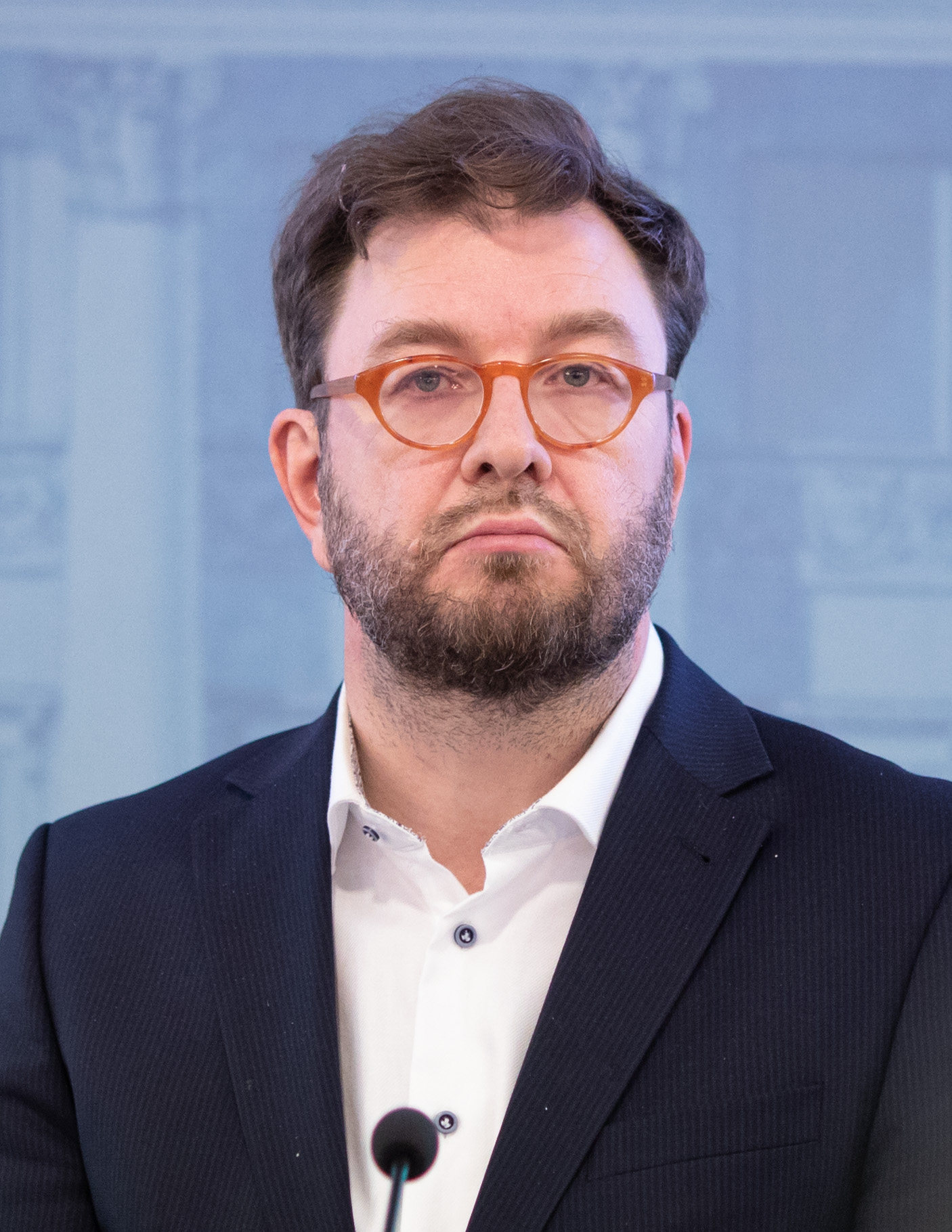
- Harakka in 2020

Minister of Transport and Communications
- In office 10 December 2019 – 20 June 2023
- Prime Minister: Sanna Marin
- Preceded by: Sanna Marin
- Succeeded by: Lulu Ranne

Minister of Labour
- In office 6 June 2019 – 10 December 2019
- Prime Minister: Antti Rinne
- Preceded by: Jari Lindström
- Succeeded by: Tuula Haatainen

Member of the Finnish Parliament
- Incumbent
- Assumed office 22 April 2015
- Constituency: Helsinki

Personal details
- Born: Timo Olavi Harakka; 31 December 1962 (age 63) Helsinki, Finland
- Party: Social Democratic
- Spouse: Anu Laitila
- Education: Master of Arts
- Alma mater: Helsinki Theatre Academy
- Profession: Journalist, author
- Website: timoharakka.fi

Timo Olavi Harakka (born 31 December 1962) is a Finnish politician. Since April 2015, he has been representative of electoral district of Uusimaa (2015-2023) and electoral district of Helsinki (2023-) in the Parliament of Finland as a Social Democrat.

In June 2019, Harakka was appointed Minister of Employment in the Rinne Cabinet. He served in the position until the collapse of the cabinet in December 2019, after which he joined the subsequent Marin Cabinet as Minister of Transport and Communications.

== Early life and education ==
Harakka was born in Helsinki but raised at Äänekoski. Both his parents were deaf and therefore his first language is Finnish sign language. He worked as a journalist for several years and was the Editor-in-chief of Jyväskylän Ylioppilaslehti, magazine of the students' union of the University of Jyväskylä, and Managing editor of Ylioppilaslehti, magazine of the University of Helsinki. He was the Editor of Vihreä Lanka, magazine linked with the Green League, and later columnist for all major news outlets of Finland, including Helsingin Sanomat, Suomen Kuvalehti and Talouselämä. Since 1997 Harakka worked as journalist and producer for the national broadcasting company Yle and hosted television programmes called Musta laatikko, Pressiklubi, and 10 kirjaa. In 2005 he graduated from the Helsinki Theatre Academy with a master of arts in theatre and drama.

== Political career ==
In the 2014 European Parliament election Harakka received 22,839 votes and was elected substitute member of the European Parliament for the Social Democratic Party. In the 2015 Finnish parliamentary election he received 5,497 votes from Uusimaa and was elected to the Parliament. He subsequently served the Finance and budget spokesperson of the parliamentary group and member of the Grand Committee of the Parliament. On 15 December 2016 Harakka announced his candidacy for the leadership of Social Democratic Party. He was defeated by the incumbent party leader Antti Rinne in the election on 4 February 2017.

On 6 June 2019, Harakka was appointed Minister of Employment. Early in his tenure, when Finland held the rotating presidency of the Council of the European Union in 2019, he chaired the meetings of the Employment, Social Policy, Health and Consumer Affairs Council.

During his tenure as the Minister of Transport and Communications, he was deeply involved in European Union data legislation. While still in office, he wrote the acclaimed book "Data Capitalism in the World of Crises" (available in English at Official website).

== Political positions ==
Harakka is well known for colourful initiatives and statements. He has described Boris Johnson's decision 2019 to prorogue parliament as "incredible", and compared it to "banning saunas in Finland".

== Honors ==
- Order of the White Rose of Finland (Finland, 2022)

Political offices
Preceded by Sanna Marin	Minister of Transport and Communications; 2019–2023	Succeeded by Lulu Ranne
Preceded by Jari Lindström	Minister of Labour; 2019	Succeeded by Tuula Haatainen
