= Liisa Jaakonsaari =

Finnish politician (born 1945)

Liisa Jaakonsaari MEP
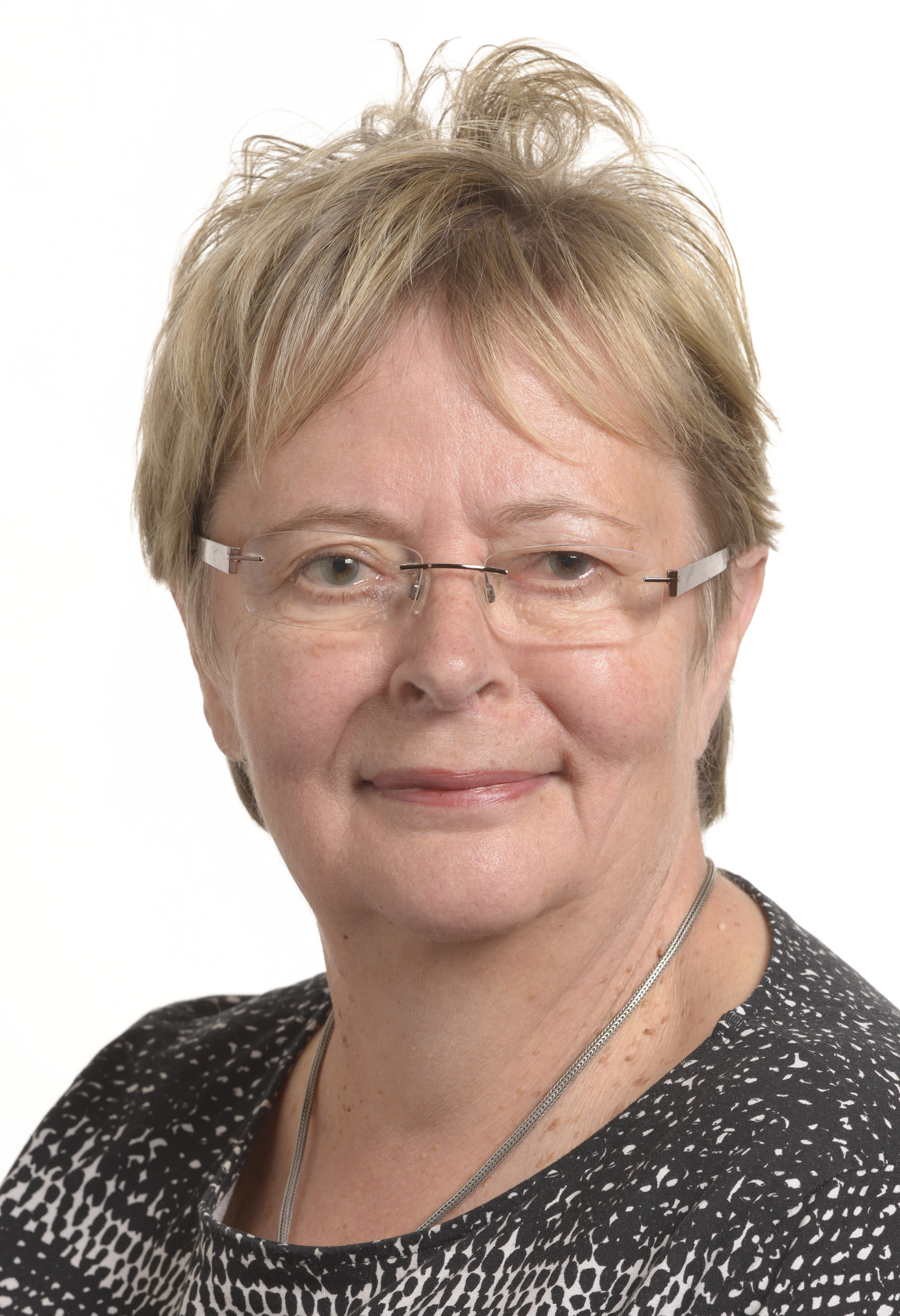

Member of the European Parliament
- In office 1 July 2009 – 2019
- Constituency: Finland

Minister of Labour
- In office 13 April 1995 – 15 April 1999
- Prime Minister: Paavo Lipponen
- Preceded by: Ilkka Kanerva
- Succeeded by: Sinikka Mönkäre

Member of the Finnish Parliament
- In office 7 March 1979 – 1 July 2009
- Constituency: Oulu

Personal details
- Born: Liisa Anneli Jaakonsaari; 2 September 1945 (age 81) Oulu, Finland
- Party: Finnish; Social Democratic Party; EU; Progressive Alliance of Socialists and Democrats
- Spouse: Seppo Jaakonsaari
- Children: 0
- Education: Stockholm University
- Website: www.liisajaakonsaari.fi

Liisa Anneli Jaakonsaari (née Ollakka; born 2 September 1945) is a Finnish politician who served as a Member of the European Parliament (MEP) from 2009 until 2019. She is a member of the Social Democratic Party, part of the Progressive Alliance of Socialists and Democrats.

Jaakonsaari was a city councillor in Oulu from 1972 until 1995. She was also a member of the Finnish parliament from 1979 until 2009, when she was elected as a Member of the European Parliament (MEP). Jaakonsaari was the Minister of Labour in Paavo Lipponen's first cabinet (1995–1999).

Unlike her party, Jaakonsaari advocated NATO membership already before the 2022 Russian invasion of Ukraine.
