= Mira Luoti =

Finnish singer

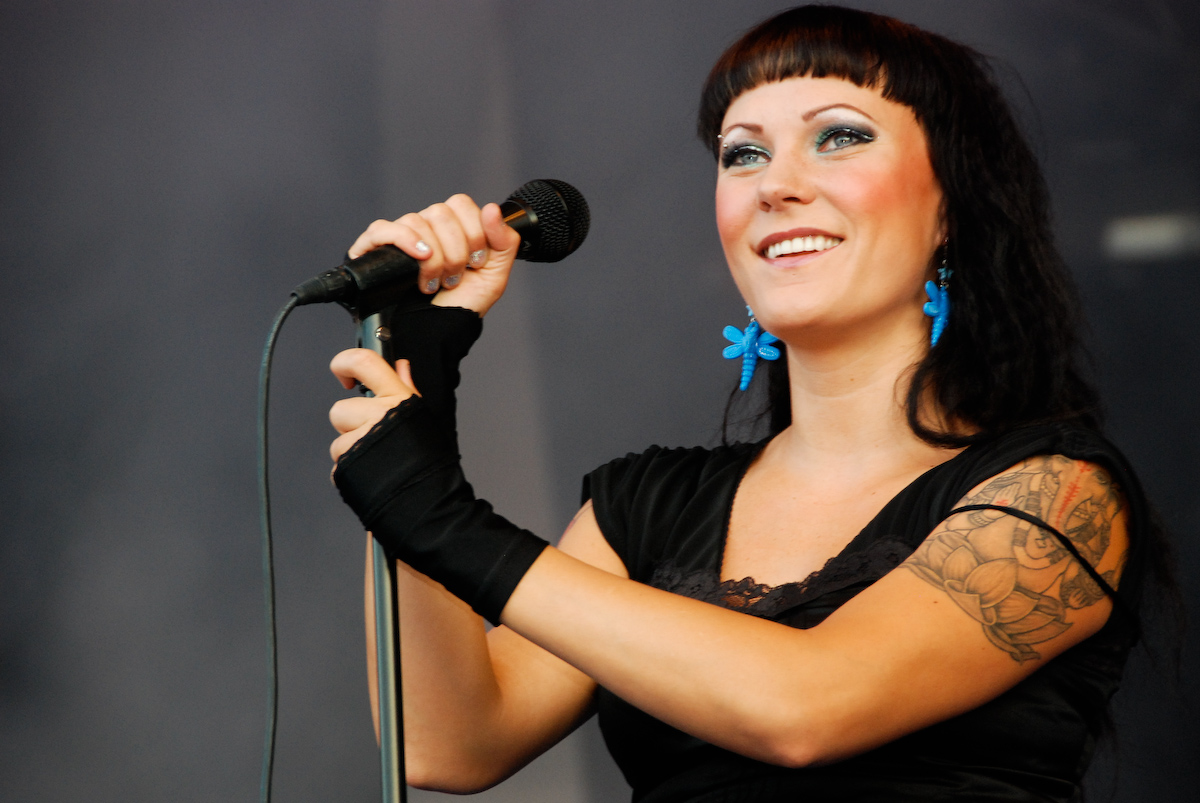
Mira Luoti performing at the Ilosaarirock 2007 festival

Mira Anna Maria Luoti (born 28 February 1978, in Pori) is a Finnish singer and actress, best known as co-frontwoman of the band PMMP with Paula Vesala.

Luoti was a guest judge on the singing competition series Idols in 2011. She released her solo albums Tunnelivisio, and Haureuden valtatiel in 2016 and 2019 respectively.

In 2021, Luoti starred in the second season of the show Myyrä.
