= Tarja Cronberg =

Finnish Green League politician

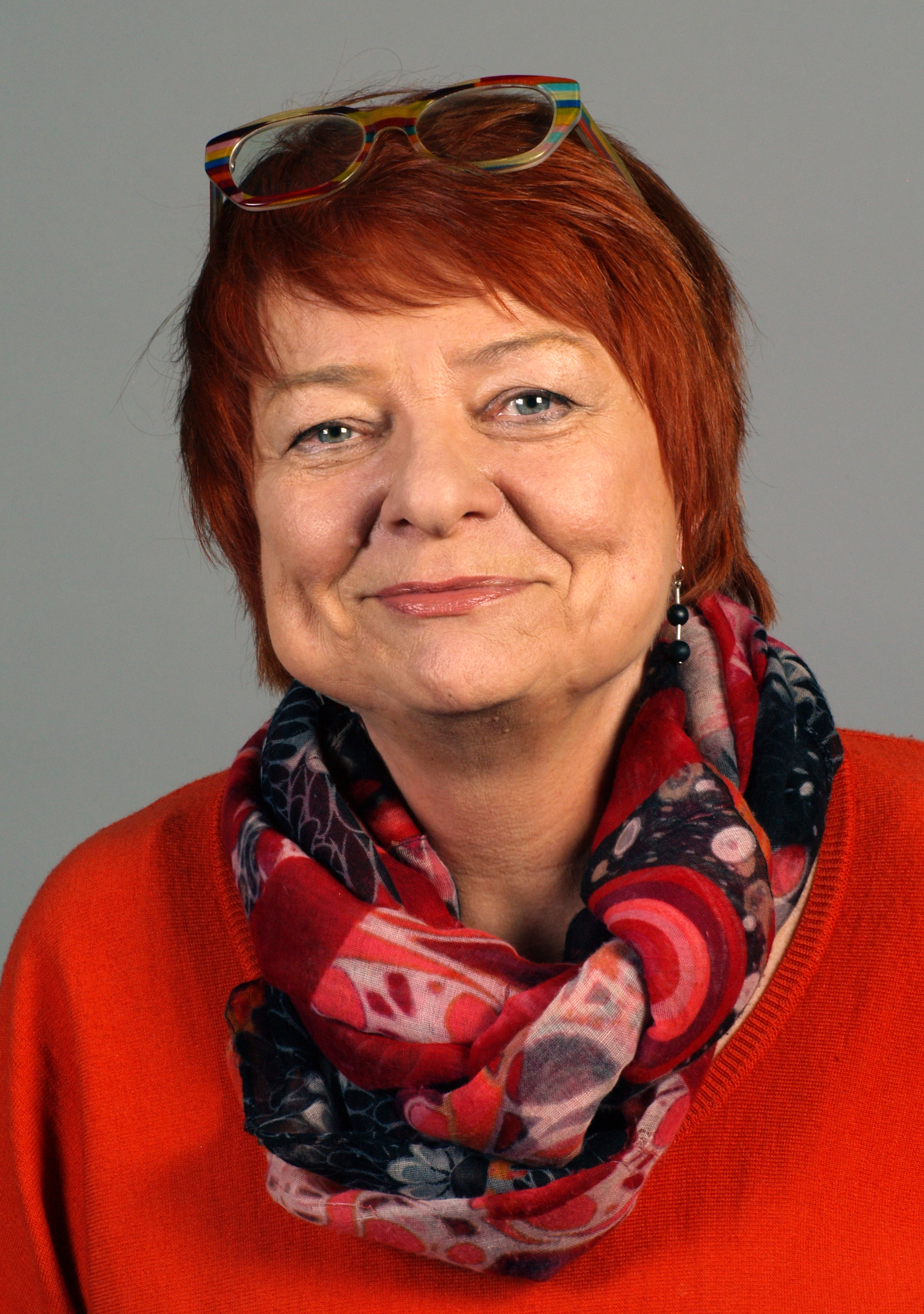
- Cronberg in 2014.

Minister of Labour
- In office 19 April 2007 – 25 June 2009
- Prime Minister: Matti Vanhanen
- Preceded by: Tarja Filatov
- Succeeded by: Anni Sinnemäki

Personal details
- Born: 29 June 1943 (age 82) Helsinki, Finland
- Party: Green League

Tarja Cronberg (née Mattila; born 29 June 1943 in Helsinki) is a Finnish Green League politician who served as a member of the European Parliament from 2011 until 2014. Cronberg was Member of the Finnish Parliament 2003–2007. She chaired her party from 2005 until 2009 and was the Minister of Labour in the Finnish government from 2007 to 2009 as part of Matti Vanhanen's second cabinet.

== Cronberg in the EU Parliament ==
Tarja Cronberg became MEP in 2011 by replacing Heidi Hautala who became Minister of International Development in the Finnish cabinet. During her 2011–2014 term in the EU Parliament, Cronberg was the chair of the European Parliament delegation for relations with Iran and served on the Committee on Foreign Affairs and the Subcommittee on Security and Defence.

== Life and work ==
Cronberg was born in Helsinki, Finland and currently resides in Copenhagen, Denmark. She holds two Ph.D. degrees: One in technology from Lund University, Sweden and another in sociology from Copenhagen Business School, Denmark, Institute of organization and work sociology.

During her 10 years in politics, she was a member of the Finnish Parliament from 2003 to 2007 and Minister of Labour from 2007 to 2009. She chaired the Green League party from 2005 to 2009 and served on several parliamentary committees, including foreign affairs, security and defence, and employment. She was also a member of the EU Competitiveness Council (2008–2009) and the EU Employment and Social Affairs Council (2007–2009).

Her research has concentrated on technology and the social sciences policy as an associate professorship at the Technical University of Denmark, among others. She was a member of the Danish Parliament Technology Council (1986–1991) and the Norwegian Research Council dealing with IT and society (1984–1992). She was a member of the European Commission Information Society Technologies Advisory Group (ISTAG) from 1999 to 2002; chaired the EU COSTA4 Group that examined the relationship between technology and society (1992–1997) and contributed to the VALUE think-tank that focused on the interaction between research and society (1993–1994).

After her period in the European Parliament she was appointed as a Distinguished Associate Fellow of SIPRI, first in the European Security Program and later in the Nuclear and Arms Control Program.

The focal point in Cronberg's work in recent times has been peace and security. After the Cold War she worked both in Russia and in the US studying the conversion of military industries into civilian uses. Together with Stanford University and the Perm Technical University she and her team studied the transformation processes mainly in the aerospace industry. As the Regional Director of North Karelia she was instrumental in establishing "soft borders" between Finnish border regions and the Karelian Republic on the Russian side. Her work led to the establishment of Euregio Karelia, a cross-border region with common development programmes and projects.

Later, as the director of COPRI, Copenhagen Peace Research Institute she was involved in the further development of the Copenhagen School of Security Studies, doing also work on missile defence and dual-use technologies. In her political work she has specialised in defence and security matters, lately in questions of nuclear disarmament. Her choice of committees in the EU Parliament reflects these interests, as does her work as the Chair of the Parliament's delegation for relations with Iran. Her current work at Sipri is focused a nuclear disarmament and the nuclear order. An in 2020 she carried out an internal SIPRI- study on the security structures of the Middle East.

Her latest book is “Renegotiating the Nuclear Order. A Sociological Approach”, Routledge, April 2021. Here the approach is one of the sociology of technology and the main thread is the distribution of the rights and responsibilities between the nuclear and non-nuclear states. The overall conclusion deals with whether the Nuclear Non-Proliferation Treaty (NPT) can be reformed from within. More concrete nuclear policy conclusions focus on the monopoly of nuclear weapon states, empowering non-nuclear states, and the future relationship between the NPT and the new treaty to prohibit nuclear weapons. Furthermore, the question of who should designate proliferators is answered.

In addition to her native Finnish, Cronberg is fluent in Danish, English, French, German, Russian and Swedish.

She was diagnosed with breast cancer at the turn of the year 2008/2009.

In November 2023 and April 2024, during the Russian invasion of Ukraine, Cronberg participated in Russian conferences at the expense of the Russian state as revealed by an international investigative journalism collaboration based on leaked documents from the Kremlin. The conferences were described as a Russian influence operation aimed at providing a pro-Russian narrative and criticism of NATO simultaneously. In the wake of the controversy, the University of Eastern Finland decided to cancel Cronberg's planned appointment as an honorary doctorate because of her appearance in the conferences that goes against the university's principles and practices.

Party political offices
Preceded by Osmo Soininvaara	Chairperson of the Green League; 2005–2009	Succeeded by Anni Sinnemäki
Political offices
Preceded by Tarja Filatov	Minister of Labour; 2007–2009	Succeeded by Anni Sinnemäki
