= Terhi Kokkonen =

Finnish musician (born 1974)

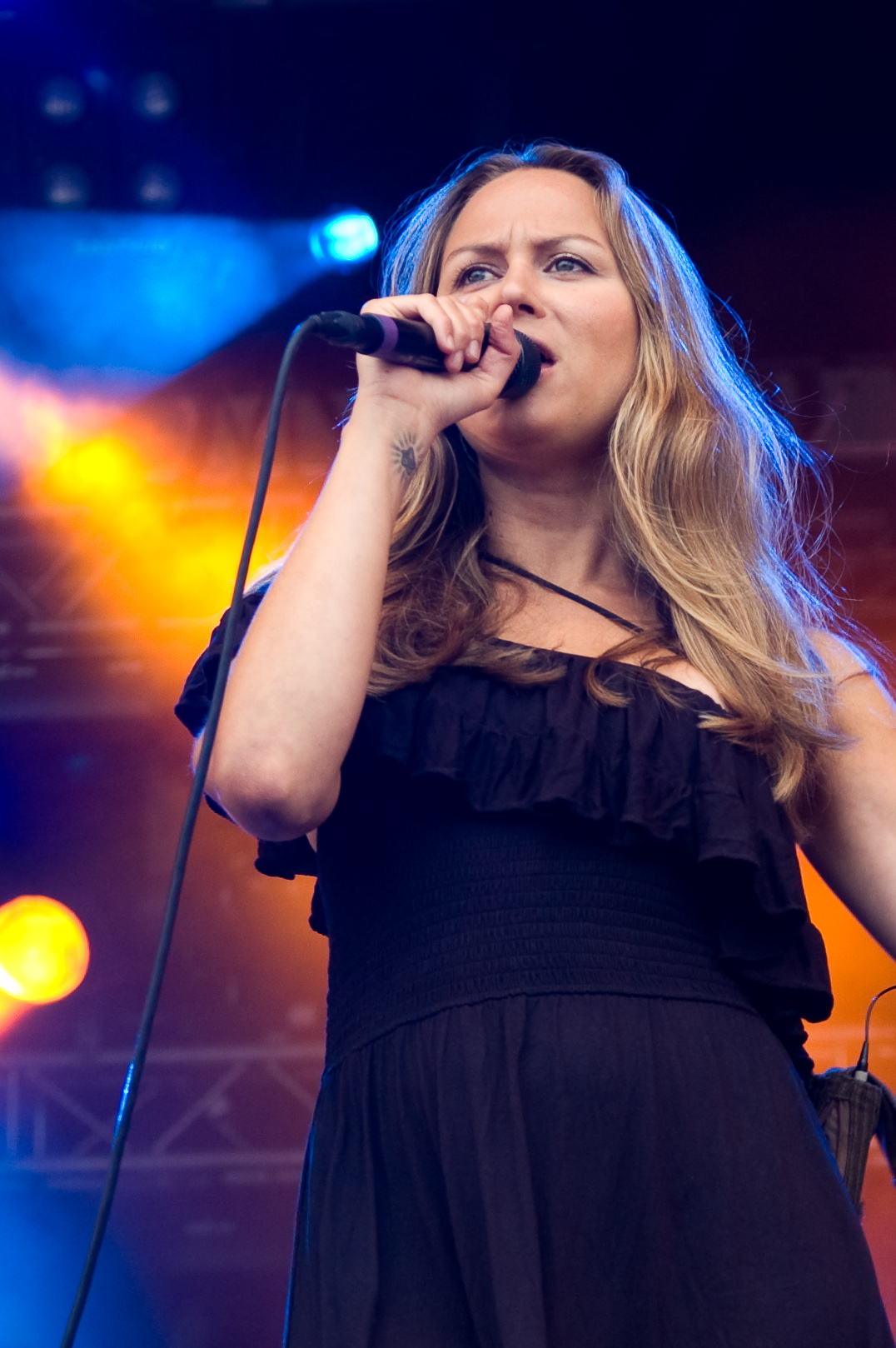
Terhi Kokkonen performing at the Ilosaarirock festival on the 12th of July 2008 in Joensuu, Finland.

Terhi Kokkonen (born 1974) is a Finnish musician. She is the former vocalist of Ultra Bra. She is now the vocalist for the Finnish band Scandinavian Music Group.
