= Lulu Ranne =

Finnish politician (born 1971)

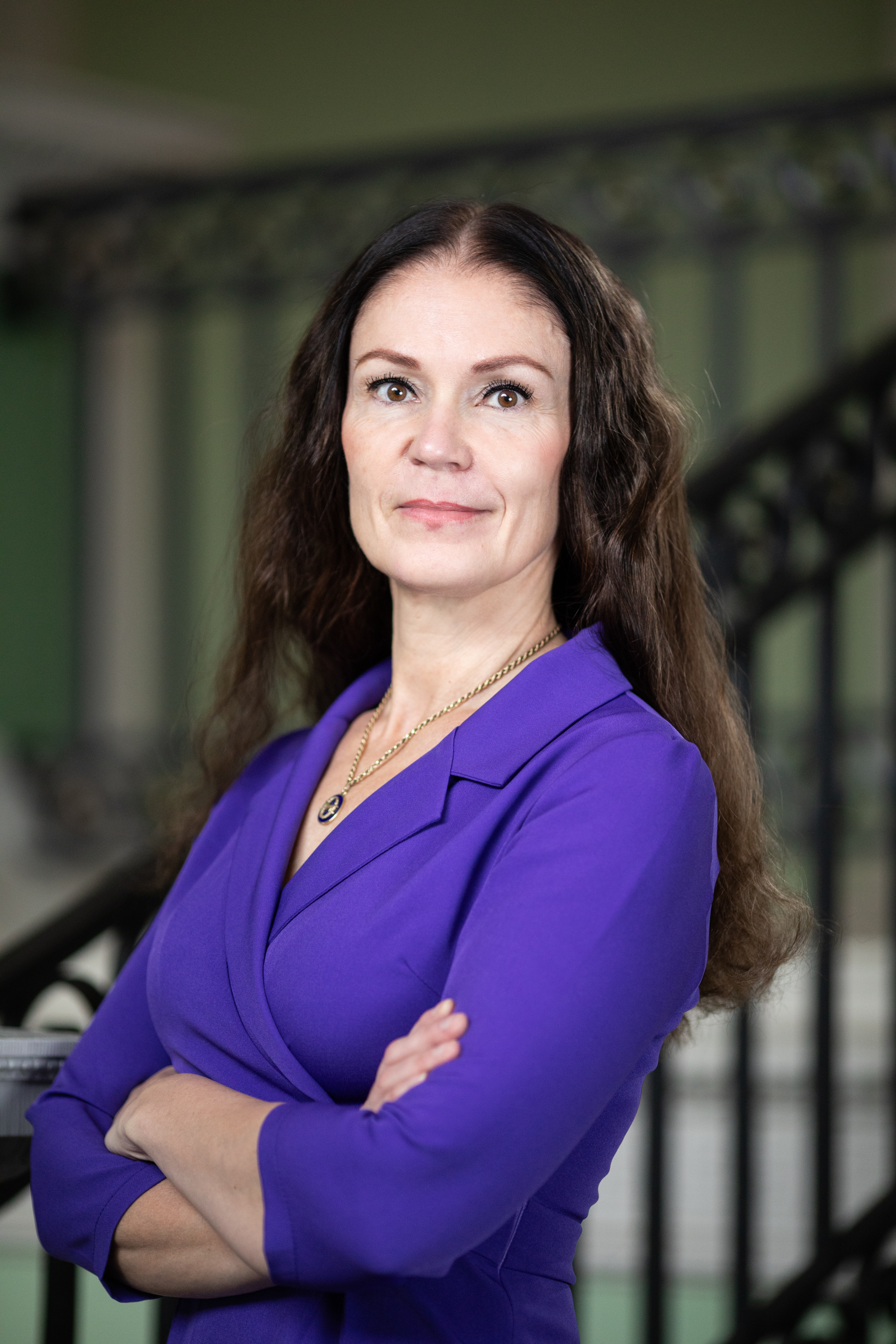
- Ranne in 2023

Minister of Transport and Communications
- Incumbent
- Assumed office 20 June 2023
- Prime Minister: Petteri Orpo
- Preceded by: Timo Harakka

Member of the Finnish Parliament for Tavastia
- Incumbent
- Assumed office 17 April 2019

Personal details
- Born: 12 July 1971 (age 54) Kristinestad, Ostrobothnia, Finland
- Party: Finns

Lulu Ranne (born 12 July 1971) is a Finnish politician currently serving in the Parliament of Finland for the Finns Party in the Tavastia constituency. She has also served as Minister of Transport and Communications since 2023.

== Early life ==
Born in Kristinestad, Finland, Ranne moved to Haparanda, Sweden when she was six years old and lived there until she was eighteen. She speaks both Finnish and Swedish.

== Political career ==
In June 2023, she was appointed Minister of Transport and Communications in the Orpo Cabinet.

== Political views ==
In an interview given for Suomen Uutiset in 2021, Ranne stated that she does not consider the Intergovernmental Panel on Climate Change (IPCC) a scientific organization; rather, she believes it is a political organization that publishes propaganda and spreads "climate panic" with the aim of increasing totalitarianism in society. She said that she holds a view that it is not known whether human activities have had an effect on global warming and that international climate conferences do not aim to reduce greenhouse gas emissions but to maintain a sense of crisis in people. She claimed that if global warning really concerned the European Union, it would spend one billion euros a year on the development of fusion power.
