= Tarja Filatov =

Finnish politician (born 1963)

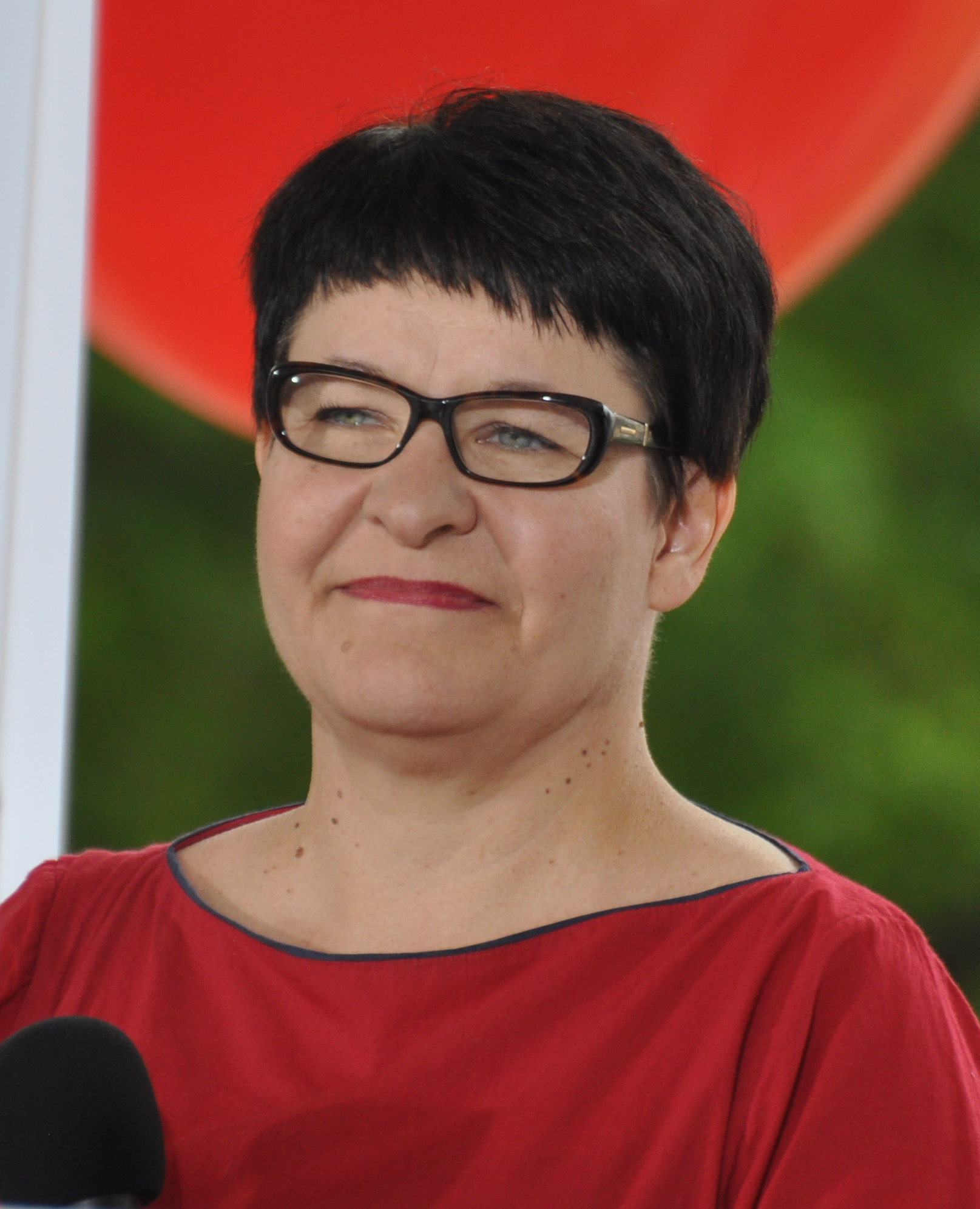

Member of the Parliament of Finland
- Incumbent
- Assumed office 23 March 1995
- Constituency: Häme

Minister of Employment
- In office 25 February 2000 – 19 April 2007
- Prime Minister: Paavo Lipponen; Anneli Jäätteenmäki; Matti Vanhanen
- Preceded by: Sinikka Mönkäre
- Succeeded by: Tarja Cronberg

Personal details
- Born: 1963 (age 62–63) Hämeenlinna, Kanta-Häme, Finland
- Party: Social Democratic
- Education: University of Tampere

Tarja Katarina Filatov (born 1963) is a Finnish politician who serves in the Parliament of Finland for the constituency of Häme as a member of the Social Democratic Party of Finland. She was Minister of Employment in the cabinets of three prime ministers from 2000 to 2007.

== Early life and education ==
Tarja Katarina Filatov was born in Hämeenlinna, Finland, in 1963. She matriculated in the social sciences programme at the Workers' Academy in 1983, and graduated from Tampere University with a degree in social sciences.

== Career ==
In the 1995 election Filatov was elected to the Parliament of Finland as a member of the Social Democratic Party of Finland (SDP). Filatov served as Minister of Employment from 25 February 2000 to 19 April 2007, in the governments of Paavo Lipponen, Anneli Jäätteenmäki, and Matti Vanhanen. She was Second Deputy Speaker from 2 February 2010 to 19 April 2011, and First Deputy Speaker from 18 December 2020 to 28 May 2021.

During Filatov's tenure in parliament she served on the Finance, Education and Culture, Transportation and Communication, Agriculture and Forestry, Legal Affairs, and Intelligence Supervision committees. She was chair of the Employment and Equality committee from 30 June 2011 to 21 April 2015, and from 5 May 2015 to 16 April 2019, before serving as vice-chair from 2 May to 17 June 2019. She was a member of Finland's delegations to the Council of Europe and Nordic Council. She is one of the longest serving female members of the Finnish parliament.

Filatov was vice chair of the SDP parliamentary group from 24 March 1999 to 13 March 2002, and chair from 22 March 2007 to 1 February 2010.

== Political positions ==
In 2009, Filatov called for Vanhanen to resign due to his campaign finance scandal.

== Works cited ==
=== News ===
- "Opposition Demands Prime Minister's Resignation". Yle. 23 September 2009. Archived from the original on 23 June 2025.
- "Parliament votes in Tarja Filatov as first Deputy Speaker". Yle. 18 December 2020. Archived from the original on 3 April 2023.

=== Web ===
- "Ministerit nimikkeittäin". Finnish Government. Archived from the original on 14 April 2018.
- "Tarja Filatov". Parliament of Finland. Archived from the original on 23 May 2022.

Preceded by Sinikka Mönkäre	Minister of Labour; 2000–2007	Succeeded by Tarja Cronberg
