= Ilmo Paananen =

Finnish civil servant and politician (1927–2014)

Ilmo Severi Paananen (23 December 1927 in Sortavala – 10 October 2014) was a Finnish civil servant and politician. He served as the Minister of Labour from 13 June to 30 November 1975.

He was elected a member of the Parliament of Finland from 1966 to 1972, representing the Social Democratic Party of Finland (SDP).

He served as the mayor of Oulu from 1974 to 1990.
