= Sinikka Mönkäre =

Finnish physician and politician (born 1947)

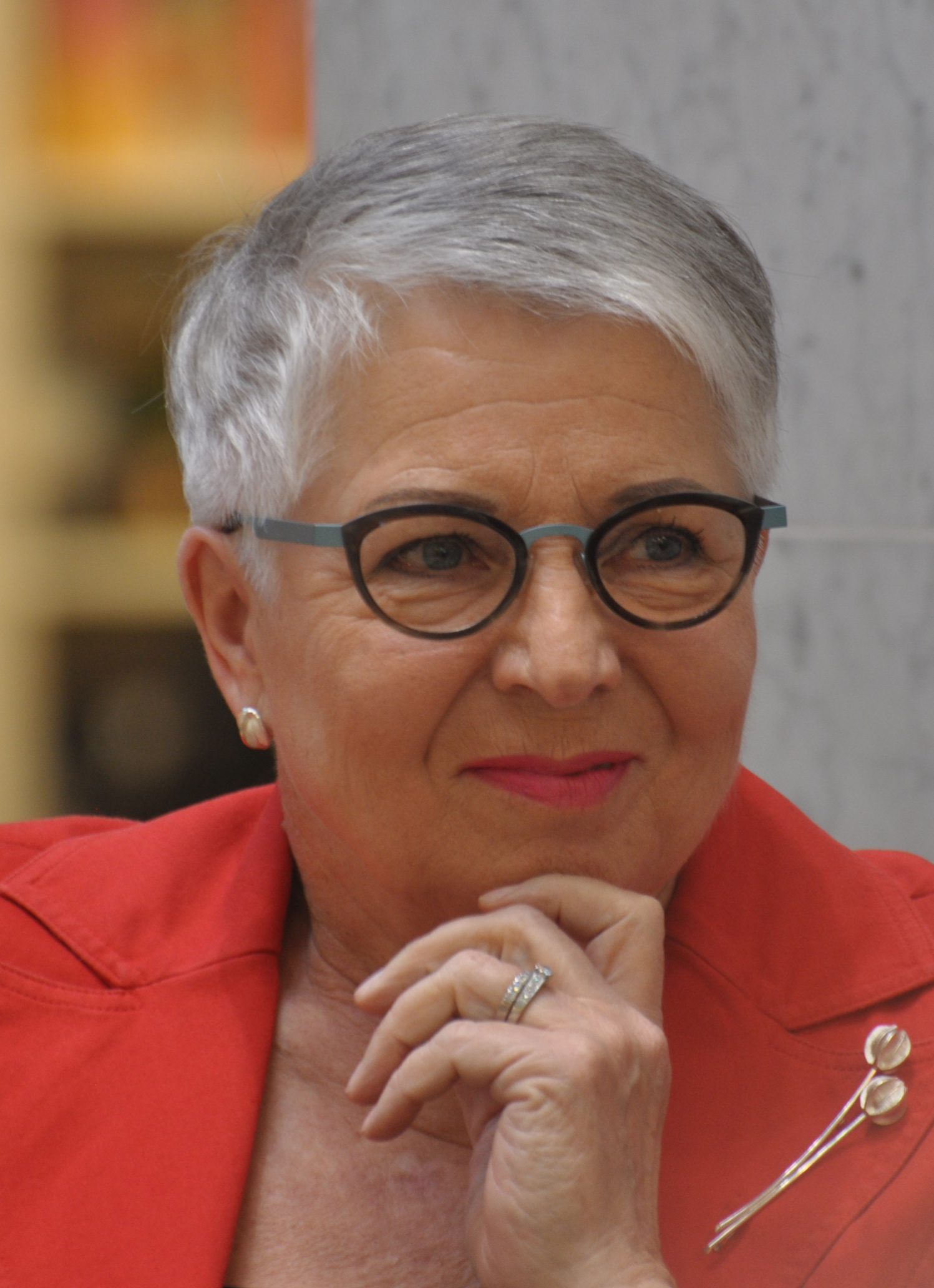

Minister of Social Affairs and Health
- In office 13 April 1995 – 14 April 1999
- Prime Minister: Paavo Lipponen
- Preceded by: Jorma Huuhtanen
- Succeeded by: Maija Perho
- In office 17 April 2003 – 19 April 2007
- Prime Minister: Anneli Jäätteenmäki; Matti Vanhanen
- Preceded by: Maija Perho
- Succeeded by: Tuula Haatainen

Minister of Labour
- In office 15 April 1999 – 24 February 2000
- Prime Minister: Paavo Lipponen
- Preceded by: Liisa Jaakonsaari
- Succeeded by: Tarja Filatov

Minister of Trade and Industry
- In office 25 February 2000 – 16 April 2003
- Prime Minister: Paavo Lipponen
- Preceded by: Erkki Tuomioja
- Succeeded by: Mauri Pekkarinen

Personal details
- Born: Taru Sinikka Mönkäre; 6 March 1947 (age 79) Sippola, Finland
- Party: Social Democratic Party

Sinikka Mönkäre (born 6 March 1947) is a Finnish physician and politician who served as minister in different cabinets of Finland.

== Early life and education ==
Mönkäre was born in Sippola on 6 March 1947. She has a PhD in medicine and surgery.

== Career ==
Mönkäre worked at different hospitals. From 1981 to 1995 she served at the Imatra city council in various capacities. She became a member of the Finnish Parliament in 1987 and served there until 1991.

She is a member of the Social Democratic Party. She held different ministerial roles. Her first ministerial post was the minister of social affairs and health and minister in the ministry of environment (housing) (1995–1999). She was the minister of labour from 1999 to 2000. Then she served as the minister of trade and industry from 2000 to 2003. During her term she supported the construction of a new nuclear power plant. She was appointed minister of social affairs and health to the cabinet led by Prime Minister Anneli Jäätteenmäki on 17 April 2003. On 23 September 2005, she was removed from office upon her request and replaced by Tuula Haatainen in the post.

Mönkäre was appointed managing director of the state-run Finnish Slot Machine Association (RAY) in 2006. In April 2009, she became a member of the executive committee of the RAY. She was appointed board member for the University of Turku in February 2010. She is also a member of ilmarinen’s supervisory board from 2010.
