= Anni Sinnemäki =

Finnish politician (born 1973)

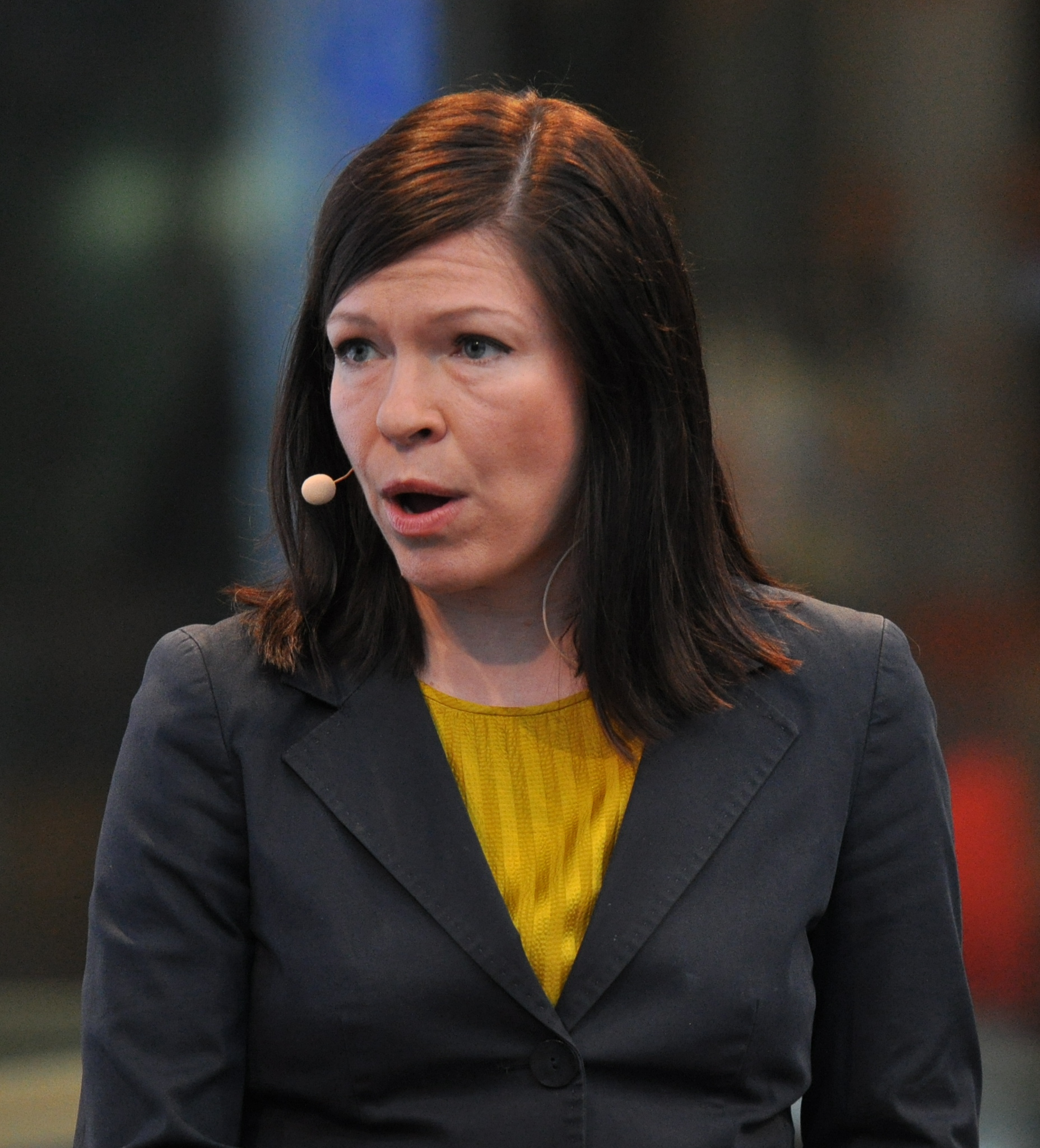
- Anni Sinnemäki in 2014

Minister of Labour
- In office 26 June 2009 – 22 June 2011
- Prime Minister: Matti Vanhanen; Mari Kiviniemi
- Preceded by: Tarja Cronberg
- Succeeded by: Lauri Ihalainen

Leader of the Green League
- In office 16 May 2009 – 11 June 2011
- Preceded by: Tarja Cronberg
- Succeeded by: Ville Niinistö

Member of the Parliament of Finland
- In office 1999–2015
- Constituency: Helsinki

Personal details
- Born: 20 July 1973 (age 53) Helsinki, Finland
- Party: Green League
- Spouses: Kerkko Koskinen (1996–2001) Anton Monti (m. 2012)
- Children: 2
- Education: University of Helsinki (B.A.)
- Occupation: Poet
- Website: www.annisinnemaki.net

Anni Milja Maaria Sinnemäki (born 20 July 1973) is a Finnish politician and a member of the Finnish Parliament between 1999 and 2015, representing the Green League.

== Biography ==
She was first elected to the parliament in 1999 and served as the Minister of Labour from 2009 to 2011. She was elected chairwoman of the Green League on 16 May 2009 and sought a second term in 2011, but lost to Ville Niinistö in a party election. She has been a member of the city council of Helsinki since 2004. She is also known for her poetry.

Sinnemäki was born in Helsinki, Finland. She has a B.A. degree in Russian literature from the University of Helsinki. Her daughter, Siiri, was born in 1990, when Sinnemäki was sixteen. Sinnemäki is the author of a series of Finnish pop lyrics of the 1990s and early 2000s for the band Ultra Bra. She was married to the founder of the band, Kerkko Koskinen, from 1996 to 2001. She married Anton Monti in 2012 and they have a son, Rufus, born in 2012.

Sinnemäki has stated that her greatest disappointment in her political career is the decision on nuclear power in 2002. On the other hand, the law on civil partnerships was the biggest victory of her political career.

Sinnemäki has defended the raising of development aid to 0.7% of GDP in parliament budget negotiations. She has also defended public transportation, municipal funding and funding for the treatment of prisoners.

Sinnemäki left the parliament in 2015, after she was elected Deputy Mayor of Helsinki.

Party political offices
Preceded by Tarja Cronberg	Chairperson of the Green League; 2009–2011	Succeeded by Ville Niinistö
Political offices
Preceded by Tarja Cronberg	Minister of Labour (Finland); 2009–2011	Succeeded by Lauri Ihalainen
