= Kerkko Koskinen =

Finnish musician (born 1973)

- Born: Kerkko Klemetti Koskinen; 7 January 1973 (age 53); Espoo, Uusimaa, Finland
- Genre: Pop
- Occupation: Musician
- Instrument: Piano

Kerkko Koskinen Kollektiivi
- Origin: Finland
- Genre: Pop
- Years active: 2012-present
- Label: Johanna Kustannus Records
- Members: Manna (vocals); Vuokko Hovatta (vocals); Maija Vilkkumaa (vocals); Kerkko Koskinen (piano)
- Past members: Paula Vesala (vocals)

Kerkko Klemetti Koskinen (born 7 January 1973) is a Finnish musician. Koskinen was the founding member and lead figure of the band Ultra Bra. He composed nearly all of Ultra Bra's songs and was the band's pianist. His most well-known solo songs are "Rakkaus viiltää" ("Love Cuts") and "Sateentekijä" ("Rainmaker").

Koskinen has worked as a talent scout for BMG and composed music for the Finnish films Upswing and Young Gods. He also composed songs for Vuokko Hovatta's solo album Lempieläimiä, one of which was a Eurovision Song Contest candidate called "Virginia". Furthermore, Koskinen wrote the song "Uuden ajan kynnyksellä" ("At the Threshold of a New Time") in memory of the murder of reporter Anna Politkovskaya.

== Kerkko Koskinen Kollektiivi ==
In 2012, Koskinen formed Kerkko Koskinen Kollektiivi, a supergroup made up of Kerkko Koskinen on piano with a number of well-known vocalists, namely Manna (real name Mariam Jäntti), Vuokko Hovatta, Maija Vilkkumaa and Paula Vesala. The group released a debut successful album Kerkko Koskinen Kollektiivi that topped the Finnish Albums Chart. Vesala soon left afterwards. The follow-up album by the group is titled 2 and was released in 2014.

== Personal life ==
Koskinen was married to Anni Sinnemäki from 1996 to 2001. From 2004 to 2008, he was married to actress and singer Pihla Viitala.

== Discography ==
=== Albums ===
Solo albums

Year	Album	Peak chart positions
Year	Album	FIN
2002	Rakkaus viiltää	5
2005	Lolita	3
2007	Agatha	8
2009	Yhteinen sävel - Ei aika mennyt koskaan enää palaa	15

Kerkko Koskinen Kollektiivi

Year	Album	Peak chart positions
Year	Album	FIN
2012	Kerkko Koskinen Kollektiivi	1
2014	2	2

=== Singles ===
- 2002: "Mayday" (Peaked in FIN: #6)
- 2002: "Sateentekijä"
- 2002: "Rakkaus viiltää" / "Neiti Nokkonen"
- 2005: "Tätä miestä ei ruoste raiskaa" / "Kukurukukukuu"
