= Ultra Bra =

Finnish pop/rock band

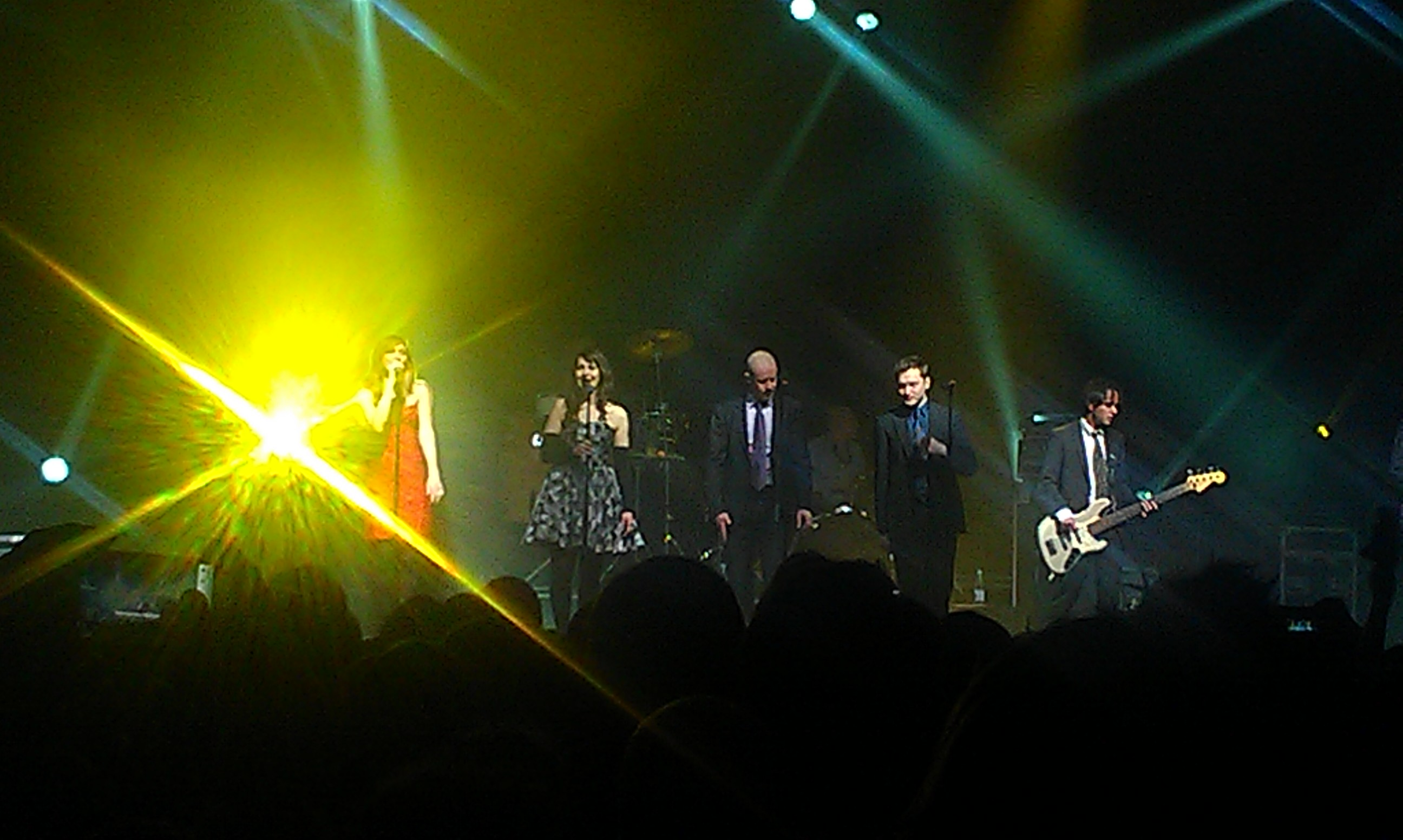
- Ultra Bra performing in support of Pekka Haavisto's 2012 presidential run at Vanha jäähalli, Helsinki, Finland.

Background information
- Origin: Helsinki, Finland
- Genres: Pop, rock
- Years active: 1994–2001, 2007, 2012, 2017, 2024–
- Label: Johanna
- Past members: Kerkko Koskinen; Vuokko Hovatta; Terhi Kokkonen; Arto Talme; Olli Virtaperko; Antti Lehtinen; Joel Melasniemi; Marko Portin; Tommi Saarikivi; Jan Pethman; Kari Pelttari; Ilmari Pohjola; Anna Tulusto
- Website: www.musicfinland.com/ultrabra

Ultra Bra is a Finnish band, formed in 1994 by Olli Virtaperko and Kerkko Koskinen. Originally disbanded in 2001, the band has made comebacks over the years, the latest in 2025 with two concerts at Helsinki Olympic Stadium.

== Band history ==
In 1994, Olli Virtaperko heard about a political song contest held by the Finnish Democratic Youth League, the youth organisation of the Finnish People's Democratic League. He entered the contest with his friend Kerkko Koskinen, who composed several songs based on lyrics from his friends and assembled a group of singers and musicians. The new band won the contest with their song "Ampukaa komissaarit, nuo hullut koirat" ("Shoot the commissioners, those mad dogs").

Ultra Bra's first EP, Houkutusten kiihottava maku ("The Exhilarating Taste of Temptation") was published in the summer of 1995. The band's name was invented during the recording sessions, and a steady lineup was settled on towards the end of 1995. By the end of the year Anni Sinnemäki, Koskinen's wife, later the most celebrated of UB's lyricists and a Green Party politician, began writing lyrics, starting with "Sankaritar" ("Heroine") and "Ken Saro-Wiwa on kuollut" ("Ken Saro-Wiwa is dead").

The band toured throughout 1996 and published their first full-length album, Vapaaherran elämää ("Lordly Life"), in the autumn of 1996. The band gained national fame with publication of the second album: Kroketti ("Croquet", 1997) remains the band's best selling album and contains some of their biggest hits, namely "Sinä lähdit pois" ("You Went Away") and "Minä suojelen sinua kaikelta" ("I Will Protect You From Everything").

In 1998, the band partook in a contest to represent Finland in the Eurovision Song Contest. While Ultra Bra did not win, their entry, "Tyttöjen välisestä ystävyydestä" ("About a Friendship Between Girls"), became a hit. The third album, Kalifornia, was released in the spring of 1999. In early 2000, Ultra Bra again participated in the Finnish Eurovision song selection process, with "Kaikki on hetken tässä" ("In This Moment, Everything's here"), not reaching the final round. In the spring, the band released several new singles, of which the song "Heikko valo" ("Weak Light") also featured in the Finnish movie Restless.

By summer 2000, Ultra Bra had decided to disband in the near future. The band's fourth and final album, Vesireittejä ("Waterways"), was published on 13 October 2000. It went number one – and sold gold – on its first week in the Finnish charts. In October 2001, a compilation album, Sinä päivänä kun synnyin ("On The Day I Was Born") was published. It consisted of one CD of previous hits and another of new songs and many rarities, along with a music video tape and a book. The band held a small tour of seven gigs, quitting on 20 October 2001, with maximum media coverage, surrounded by thousands of fans.

== Comebacks ==
Ultra Bra made a comeback on 30 January 2012 at Kokoaan suurempi Suomi 2012, a fundraiser concert for Pekka Haavisto's presidential campaign. Tickets to the concert sold out in two hours on 25 January and the rush crashed the online ticket service Tiketti.

The band toured again in the summer of 2017 and performed another set of three concerts at the Hartwall Arena in Helsinki from 15 to 17 December 2017. The 2017 comeback also included a new compilation album, Sinä päivänä kun synnyimme ("The Day We Were Born"), and limited-edition releases of their studio albums on coloured vinyl.

The band published two new singles in the summer of 2024 and performed at Olympiastadion in Helsinki in August 2025.

== Band members ==
- Kerkko Koskinen – piano, main composer and quasi-leader
- Vuokko Hovatta – vocals
- Terhi Kokkonen – vocals
- Arto Talme – vocals
- Olli Virtaperko – vocals
- Antti Lehtinen – drums
- Joel Melasniemi – guitar
- Marko Portin – saxophone
- Tommi Saarikivi – bass
- Jan Pethman – percussion
- Kari Pelttari – trumpet
- Ilmari Pohjola – trombone
- Anna Tulusto – vocals (until summer 1998)

In many orchestral pieces Ultra Bra also had an additional string section and a chorus.

=== Current projects ===
- Kerkko Koskinen is a solo artist. He composes and sings his own songs and has his own band. Anni Sinnemäki, Erpo Pakkala and Juhana Rossi have written lyrics for him. Kerkko released an album on 5 April. 2002, called Rakkaus viiltää. He has also written music for Finnish movies. His second album Lolita was released in August 2005. In 2012 Koskinen founded the supergroup Kerkko Koskinen Kollektiivi with three female vocalists from other bands, including Vuokko Hovatta.
- Terhi, Joel, Tommi and Antti have joined together to form a new band called Scandinavian Music Group. Terhi writes the lyrics and Joel makes the music for their songs. Tommi quit the band in 2003 to concentrate on family life and a career as a lawyer. Joel has also played in an Iron Maiden tribute band called Mauron Maiden. Scandinavian Music Group has released 10 albums, Onnelliset kohtaa (2002), Nimikirjaimet (2004), Hölmö rakkaus, ylpeä sydän (2006), Missä olet Laila? (2007), Palatkaa Pariisiin (2009), Manner (2011), Terminal 2 (2014), Baabel (2015), Ikuinen Ystävä (2022), Rakkaani, (2025).
- Vuokko Hovatta has a new band, called Tekniikan ihmelapset. Vuokko is also an actress and continues to play many roles in Finnish theaters. She does many other things as well, such as Finnish movie dubbing and TV roles.
- Antti Lehtinen became the new drummer of Don Huonot, a popular Finnish band, until the band broke up in 2003. He plays percussion in Kerkko's band and has been involved in producing Kerkko's album. Antti also participates in numerous other music projects.
- Jan Pethman continues to play in the band of Maija Vilkkumaa, a Finnish singer-songwriter.
- Olli Virtaperko continues to make music with his band Ensemble Ambrosius.
- Ilmari Pohjola is a member of the bands Gourmet and Silvio. He also plays for the experimental jazz group Oddarang.
- Anni Sinnemäki has been a member of the Finnish parliament from 1999 to 2015 and was the Minister for Labour and the chairwoman of Green League 2009–2011.

== Musical ==
In 2025, a musical titled Sinä lähdit pois based on the catalogue of Ultra Bra songs had its debut on the 25th of September. It was written and directed by Hannu Rantala and approved by composer Kerkko Koskinen. It has had its run at the theatre Jo-Jo Teatteri in Turku coinciding with the 30th anniversary of the theatre's history. The themes of Sinä lähdit pois include environmental activism and intergenerational differences.

== Discography ==
=== Albums ===
- "Houkutusten kiihottava maku" (1995) ("The Exciting Taste of Temptations") (EP)
- Vapaaherran elämää (1996) ("Life of a baron")
- Kroketti (1997) ("Croquet")
- Kalifornia (1999) ("California")
- Vesireittejä (2000) ("Waterways")
- Sinä päivänä kun synnyin (2001) ("On the day I was born")(Compilation)
- Sinä päivänä kun synnyimme (2017) ("On the day we were born") (Compilation)

=== Singles ===
- "Ken Saro-Wiwa on kuollut"/"Sankaritar"/"Moskova" (1996) ("Ken Saro-Wiwa Is Dead/Heroine/Moscow")
- "Kahdeksanvuotiaana"/remix (1997) ("At The Age of Eight")
- "Sinä lähdit pois"/"Lähetystyö"/"Haikara" (1997) ("You Went Away/Mission Trip/Stork")
- "Tyttöjen välisestä ystävyydestä"/a few other songs (1998) ("About Friendship Between Girls")
- "Hei kuule Suomi"/"Helsinki-Vantaa" (1999) ("Hey Hear Us Finland"/"Helsinki-Vantaa")
- "Ilmiöitä"/"Eniten" (1999) ("Phenomena/Most of all")
- "Heikko Valo" (2000) ("Weak Light")
- "Villiviini"/"Itket ja kuuntelet" (2000) ("Boston ivy/You Cry and You Listen")
- "Rubikin kuutio"/"Lapsuus loppui" (2000) ("Rubik's Cube/Childhood Ended")
- "Aarre" (2024) ("Treasure")
- "Toivo" (2024) ("Hope")

=== Other releases ===
- Kaikki laulut (sheet music book) (2001)
- Ultra Bra: Videot 1996–2001 (music video tape) (2001)
- Sokeana hetkenä (biography book) (2018)

== See also ==
- List of best-selling music artists in Finland
