= PMMP =

Finnish pop rock band

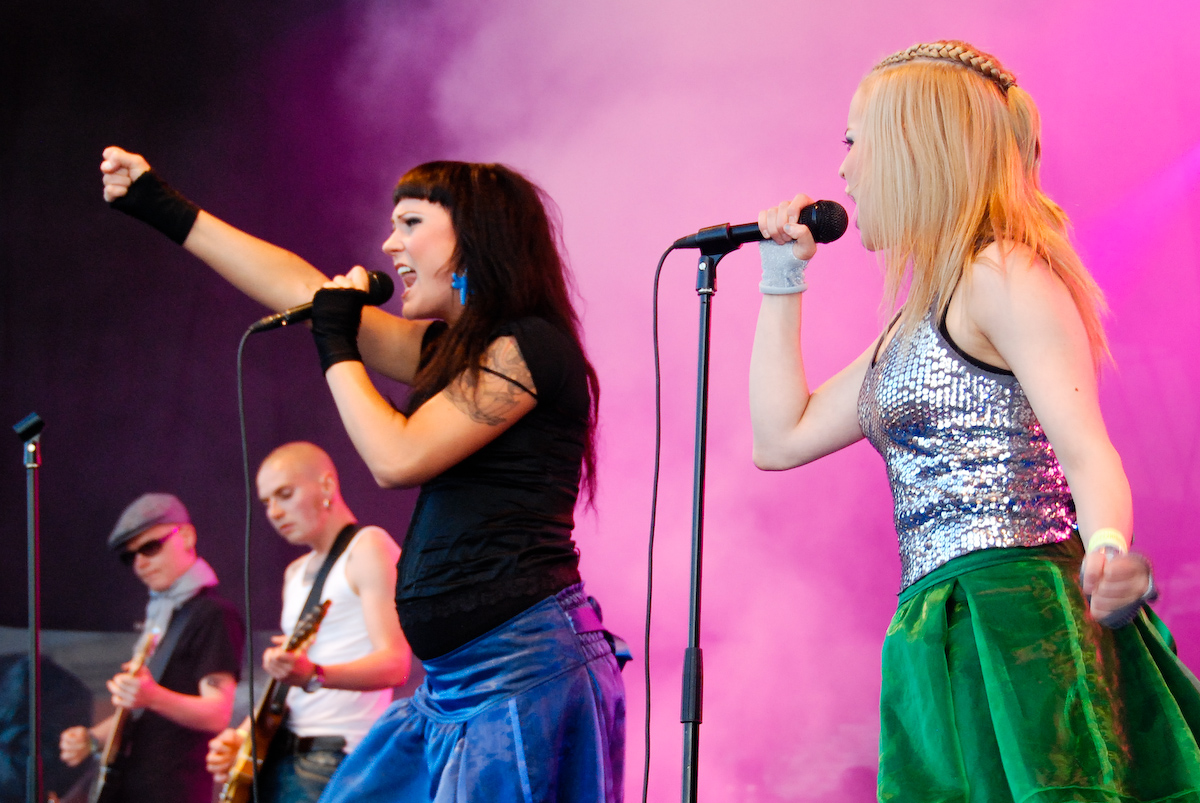
- PMMP in Ilosaarirock 2007

Background information
- Origin: Helsinki, Finland
- Genre: Pop rock
- Years active: 2002–2013, 2024
- Label: Sony BMG
- Members: Paula Vesala; Mira Luoti; Mikko Virta; Juho Vehmanen; Heikki Kytölä
- Website: www.pmmp.fi

PMMP is a Finnish pop rock band fronted by singers Paula Vesala and Mira Luoti and backed by musicians Mikko Virta, Juho Vehmanen and Heikki Kytölä. The name of the band is often said to be an abbreviation of the sentence "Paulan ja Miran Molemmat Puolet", which can be translated in English as "Both Sides of Paula and Mira". However, in an interview on the Finnish talk show Krisse Show, they stated that the name of the band comes, like ABBA, from the names of 4 of its members: so PMMP is Paula, Mira, Mira, Paula. PMMP's albums were produced by former Thergothon drummer Jori Sjöroos, who also wrote the music for all the songs. The lyrics are written by Paula and Mira. The band is an acclaimed live act.

PMMP first became well known in Finland with the 2003 summer hit Rusketusraidat ("Tan Lines"). They then enjoyed great success with their second album Kovemmat kädet ("Rougher Hands"), which sold gold (double platinum year 2010). An extended version of the album was released in August 2005. Oo siellä jossain mun, a single from the aforementioned album, is PMMP's biggest hit so far in Finland.

In November 2006 PMMP released their third album Leskiäidin tyttäret ("Daughters of a widow mother"), which sold platinum on the day it was released.

They released an album labeled Puuhevonen ("Wooden Horse") with traditional children's songs in 2007, around the time their first children were born. In 2009 they released their fourth rock/pop album Veden varaan ("Overboard") and their fifth album Rakkaudesta ("Of Love"), released in 2012, is considered as their comeback album.

PMMP played their final concert on October 27, 2013, in the sold-out Helsinki Ice Hall.

On 11 September 2023, PMMP announced a reunion after 10 years, with the first show at Helsinki Olympic Stadium on 24 August 2024.

== "Matka jatkuu vaan" – The Journey Continues ==
In an article titled "Matka jatkuu vaan" in the biggest Finnish newspaper Helsingin Sanomat (17.2.2007), journalist Leena Virtanen attempts to explain how it is that PMMP appeal to both children and adults, concluding that while indeed an energetic pop band PMMP "live within the space between childhood and adulthood", referring to the lifeworlds of both children and adults, carried through with eternal optimism. Virtanen concludes with the words from one of PMMP's best known songs "Matkalaulu" (travel song), which is in fact a song about the band being on the road: "Tämä voi olla koko elämämme ihanin päivä. Ajetaan hiljempaa. Toivon, että matka jatkuu, jatkuu vaan" [This could be the most wonderful day of our whole life. Let's drive slower. I hope the journey goes on, goes on and on..."]

== Activism ==
PMMP has supported Amnesty International's work against the violence towards women. The song Joku raja (meaning "[there has to be] some boundary", an expression in Finnish to express that a line has been crossed) from the album Leskiäidin tyttäret is named after Amnesty's campaign by the same name.

On 25 May 2013 PMMP was supposed to perform together with two members of the Russian punk band Pussy Riot at the Maailma kylässä (World Village) festival in Helsinki. The members of Pussy Riot had disappeared and PMMP performed without them but supported their cause for human rights in Russia.

Following that event, after 10 years of performing, the group disbanded.

== The members of PMMP ==
- Paula Vesala, December 10, 1981 – vocals
- Mira Luoti, February 28, 1978 – vocals
- Mikko Virta, March 22, 1982 – guitar, backing vocals
- Juho Vehmanen, March 31, 1981 – bass guitar, backing vocals, keyboards
- Heikki Kytölä, October 14, 1981(?) – drums, percussion, backing vocals

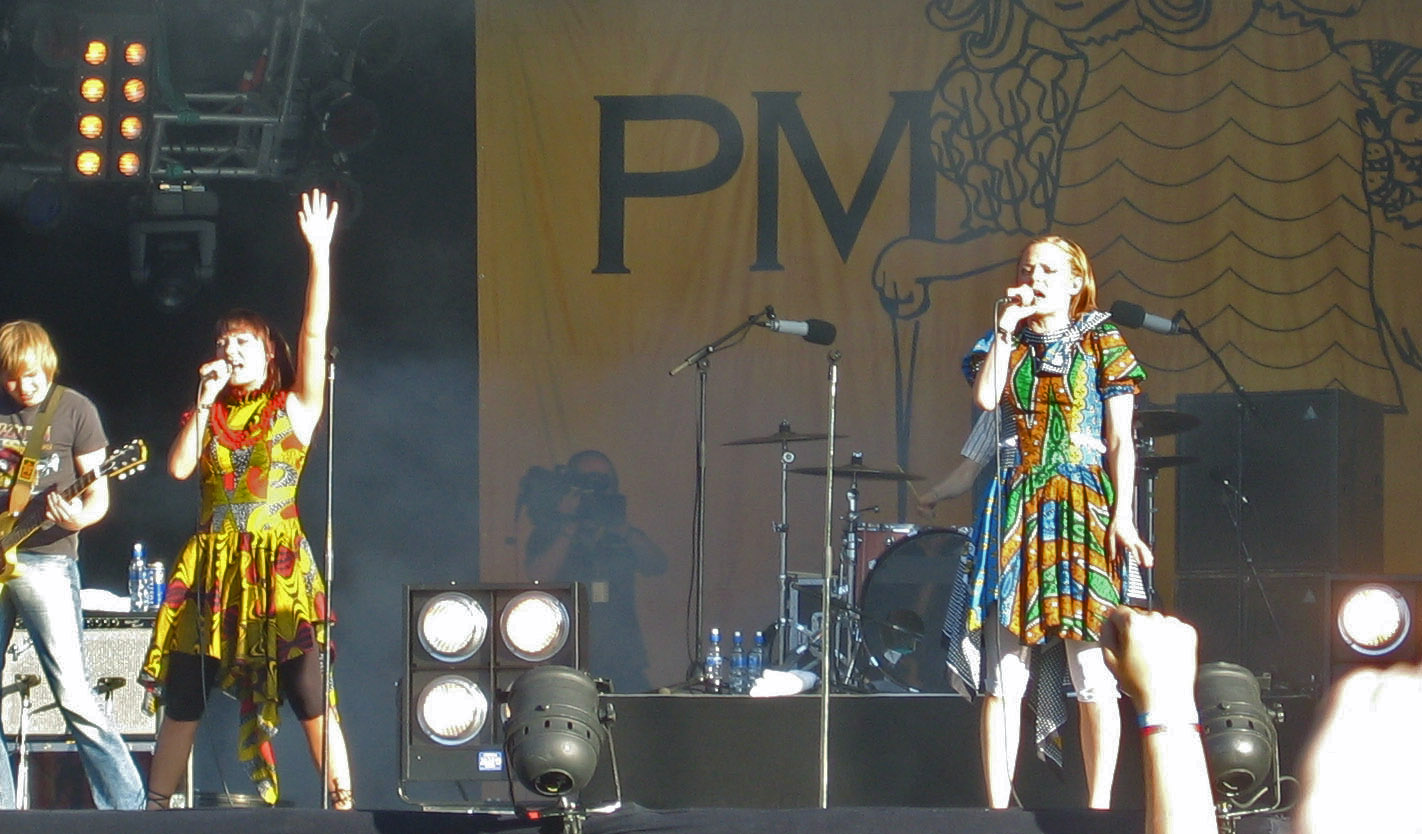
PMMP in concert, 2006

== Discography ==
=== Studio albums ===
Year	Album	Peak position	Certification
2003	Kuulkaas enot!: Released: 5 September 2003; Record label: BMG	6	Platinum
2005	Kovemmat kädet: Released: 9 March 2005; Record label: Sony BMG; Also special release Kovemmat kädet (Kumipainos)	2	2× platinum
2006	Leskiäidin tyttäret: Released: 15 November 2006; Record label: Sony BMG	1	Platinum
2007	Puuhevonen: Released: 14 November 2007; Record label: Sony BMG	3	Platinum
2009	Veden varaan: Released: 25 March 2009; Record label: Sony Music	1	Platinum
2012	Rakkaudesta: Released: 11 June 2012; Record label: Sony Music	1	Gold
2013	Hitit: Released: 20 September 2013; Record label: Sony Music	16	

=== Singles ===
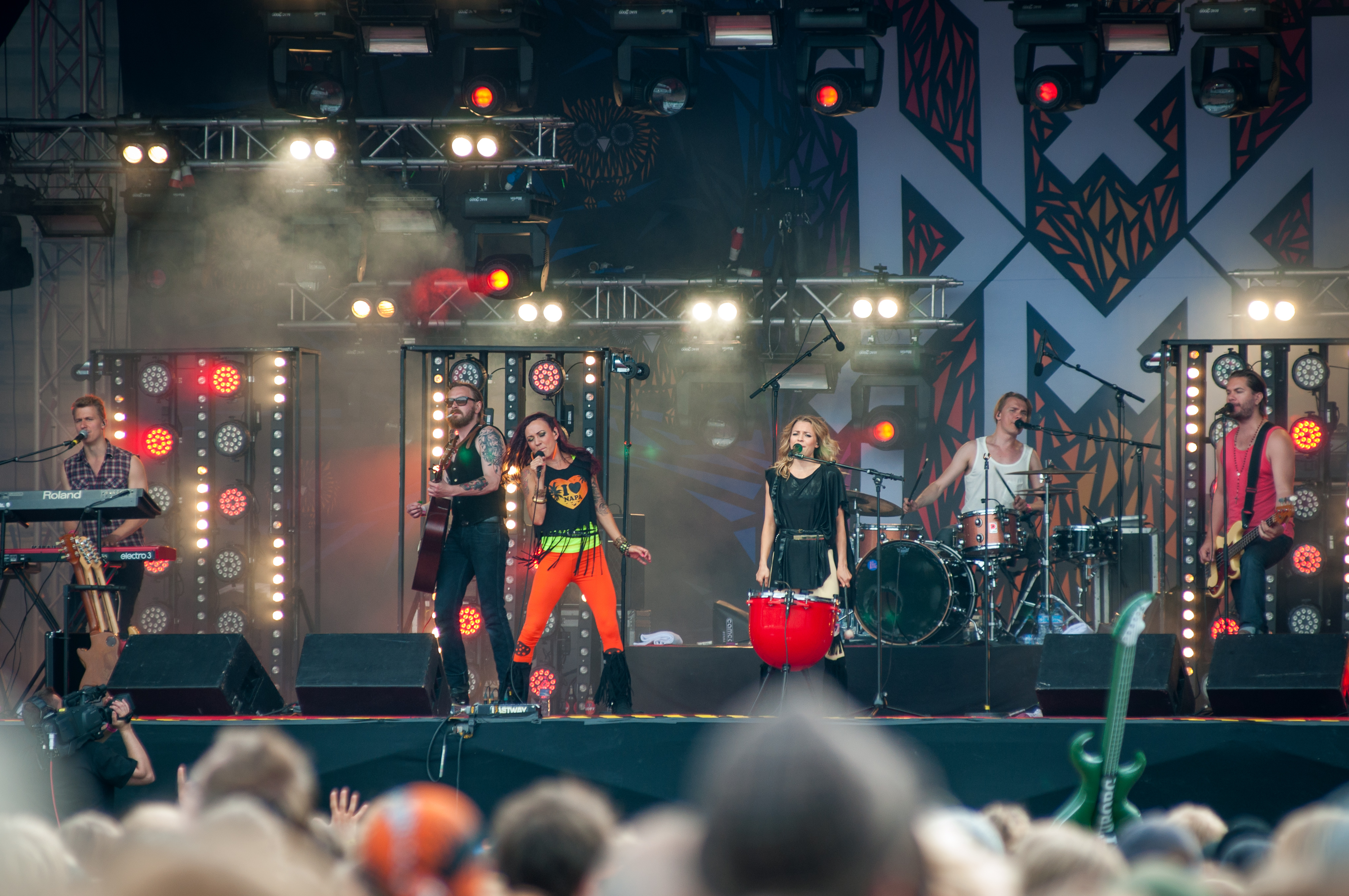
PMMP performing at the 2012 Ilosaarirock festival in Joensuu, Finland

- 2003: "Rusketusraidat" (#1) Tan Lines
- 2003: "Niina" (promo only)
- 2003: "Joutsenet" (#8)
- 2005: "Päiväkoti" (#13) Kindergarten
- 2005: "Oo siellä jossain mun" (promo only)
- 2005: "Matkalaulu" Journey Song (promo only)
- 2005: "Pikkuveli" Little Brother (promo only)
- 2006: "Henkilökohtaisesti" Face to Face
- 2006: "Tässä elämä on" Life Is Here (radio only)
- 2006: "Kiitos" (promo / radio only)
- 2007: "Joku raja" (#1)
- 2009: "Viimeinen valitusvirsi" The Last Jeremiad
- 2009: "Lautturi" Ferryman (promo/radio only)
- 2009: "Pariterapiaa" Couple Therapy
- 2009: "Lapsuus loppui" Childhood Ended (promo/radio only)
- 2012: "Heliumpallo" Helium Balloon
- 2012: "Rakkaalleni" To My Love
