= Veden varaan =

2009 album by PMMP

Studio album by PMMP
- Released: March 25 2009
- Genre: pop rock
- Length: 45:46
- Label: Sony BMG
- Producer: Jori Sjöroos

PMMP chronology
Puuhevonen (2007)	Veden varaan (2009)	Rakkaudesta (2012)

Veden varaan is the fifth studio album by Finnish pop rock group PMMP. It was released in 2009 through Sony BMG.

The album cover was photographed by Susanna Majuri and Tero Kartastenpää.

== Track listing ==
1. Kuvia
2. San Francisco
3. Lautturi
4. Viimeinen valitusvirsi
5. Taajama
6. Pariterapiaa
7. Merimiehen vaimo
8. Tulva
9. Lapsuus loppui
10. Se vaikenee joka pelkää
