= Arto Satonen =

Finnish politician

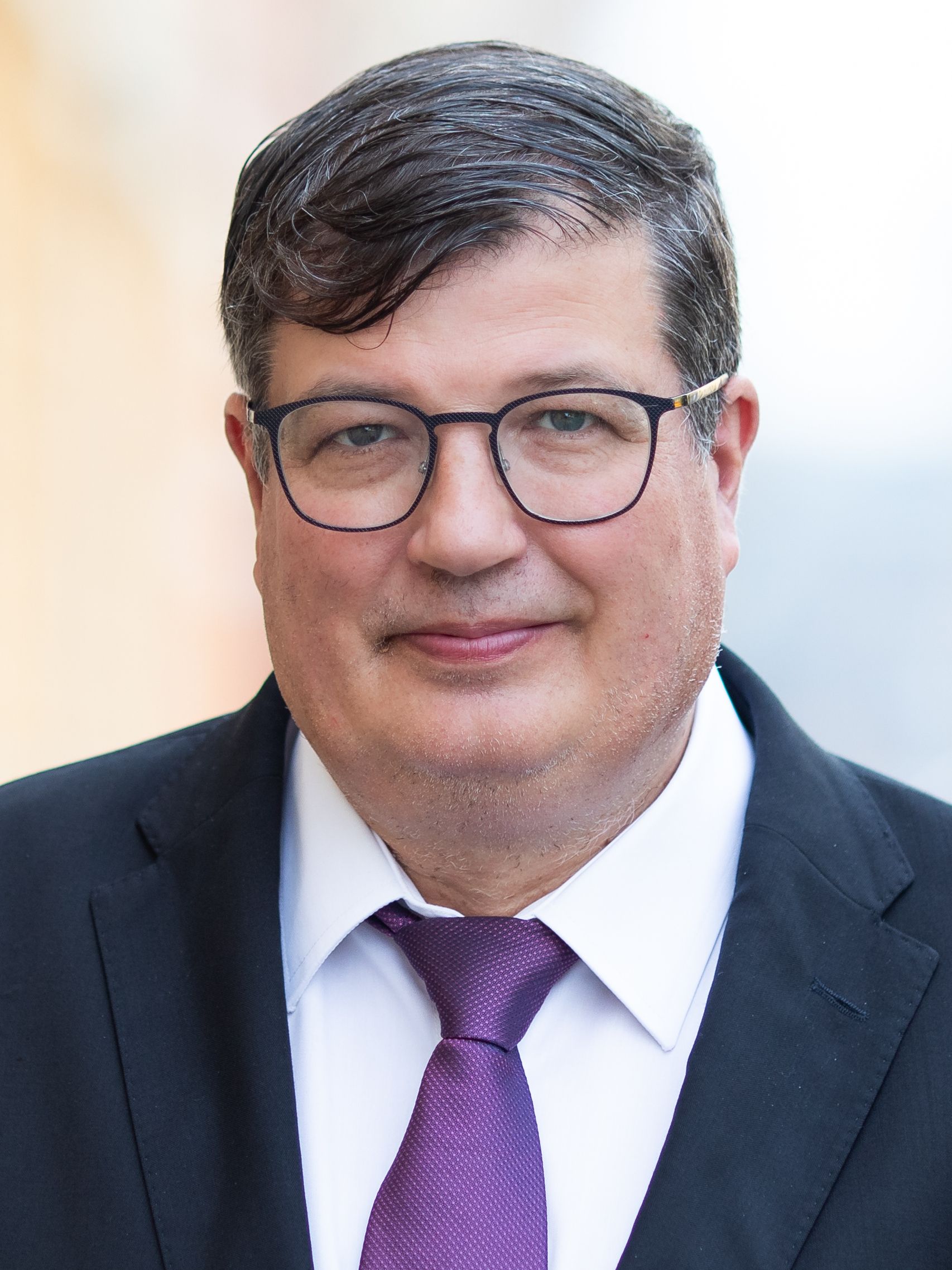
Arto Satonen in 2023.

Arto Olavi Satonen (born 20 October 1966) is a Finnish politician and a member of the Finnish Parliament, representing the National Coalition Party. He was first elected to the Parliament in the 2003 parliamentary election. Satonen served as the vice-chairman of the parliamentary group of the National Coalition Party 2012–2014 and chairman 2014–2016. In June 2016 Satonen was chosen as the second deputy speaker for the Parliament and served in the position until the reshuffle of the seats in February 2018.

Satonen was born in Vammala. Before his career in politics, he worked as a teacher in various universities of applied sciences. He also ran a grill kiosk in Vammala for five years.

In June 2023, he was appointed Minister of Employment in the Orpo Cabinet.
