= Scandinavian Music Group =

Finnish band

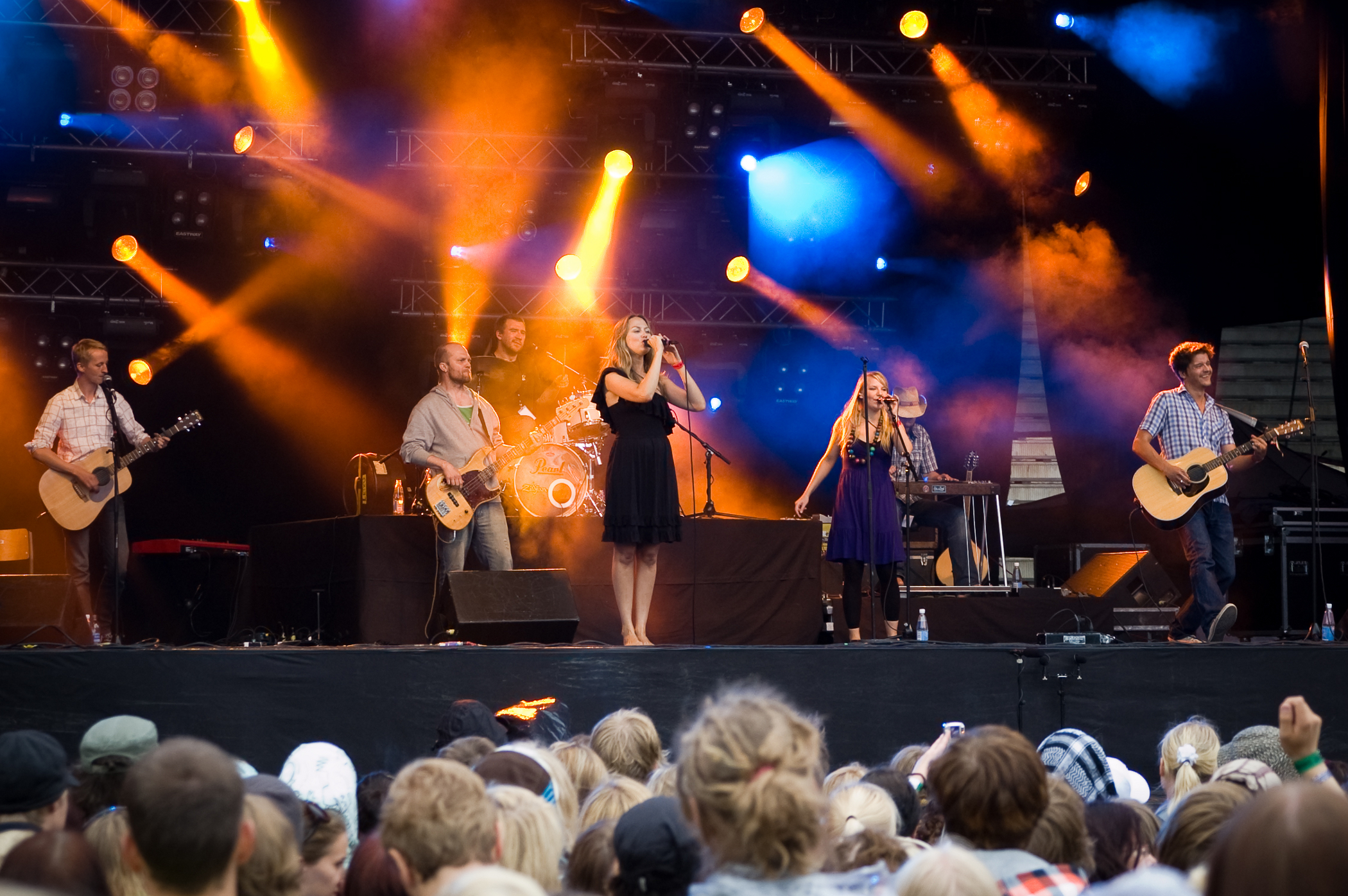
- Scandinavian Music Group performing on the main stage of the Ilosaarirock festival in July 2008

Background information
- Origin: Helsinki, Finland
- Genres: Pop, rock, folk rock
- Years active: 2002–present
- Labels: Cortison Records, Sony BMG
- Members: Terhi Kokkonen; Joel Melasniemi; Antti Lehtinen; Oskari Halsti; Kyösti Salokorpi; Pauliina Kokkonen; Miikka Paatelainen
- Past members: Tommi Saarikivi; Anssi Växby
- Website: Scandinavianmusicgroup.com

Scandinavian Music Group (or SMG) is a Finnish band founded in 2002 by former Ultra Bra members. They have released ten albums as of 2025.

== Band members ==
- Terhi Kokkonen: vocals (2002–)
- Joel Melasniemi: guitar (2002–)
- Antti Lehtinen: drums (2002–)
- Olli Äkräs: guitar, keyboards (2013-)
- Oskari Halsti: bass (2014–)
- Pauliina Kokkonen: backing vocals (2007–)
- Miikka Paatelainen: lap steel (2007–)

=== Past members ===
- Tommi Saarikivi: bass (2002–2003)
- Kyösti Salokorpi: guitar, keyboards (2003–2013)
- Anssi Växby: bass (2003–2014)

== Discography ==
=== Albums ===
Year	Album	Peak positions
Year	Album	FIN
2002	Onnelliset kohtaa	1
2004	Nimikirjaimet	11
2006	Hölmö rakkaus ylpeä sydän	5
2007	Missä olet Laila?	6
2009	Palatkaa Pariisiin!	2
2011	Manner	1
2014	Terminal 2	1
2015	Baabel	11
2022	Ikuinen ystävä	5
2025	Rakkaani,	26

Compilation albums

Year	Album	Peak positions
Year	Album	FIN
2009	Näin minä vihellän matkallani	11

=== Singles ===
Charting singles

Year	Single	Peak positions	Album
Year	Single	FIN	Album
2002	"Kun tuuli oli viilee"	3	Onnelliset kohtaa
2002	"Tällaisena kesäyönä"	7	Onnelliset kohtaa
2003	"Kun tuuli oli viilee"	13	
2004	"100 km Ouluun"	14	

Songs

- Kun tuuli oli viilee / Kun puut tekee seittiä (2002)
- Tällaisena kesäyönä / Ei mulle riitä (2002)
- Minne katosi päivät (promo) (2002)
- Ei mun oo hyvä olla yksin / Mitä hyödyttää (2002)
- Letitä tukkani / Nää aamut (2003)
- 100 km Ouluun (2004)
- Säälittävä syksy (promo) (2004)
- Huomisen sää (promo) (2004)
- Valmis (promo) (2005)
- Hölmö rakkaus (promo) (2006)
- Ylpeä sydän (promo) (2006)
- Vieläkö soitan banjoa? (promo) (2007)
- Mustana, maidolla, kylmänä, kuumana (promo) (2007)
- Naurava turskan kallo (promo) (2007)
- Levoton tuhkimo (promo) (2008) (Dingo cover)
- Näin minä vihellän matkallani (promo) (2009)
- Casablanca / Ambulanssi tuli ja kaikki itki (promo) (2009)
- 100 km Ouluun (2009 versio) (promo) (2009)
- Hautojen yli (2011)
- Kaunis Marjaana (2012)
- Balladi 1 (2013)
