= List of World Trade Centers =

A world trade center is a term for a building, usually a complex of buildings used for the promotion and expansion of trade and licensed to use the "world trade center" term by the World Trade Centers Association (WTCA). As of May 2020, the WTCA included 323 properties in 90 countries. Founded in 1968, it serves as a non-political umbrella organization within which members network for the provision of trade services and to develop international trade relations. A World Trade Center brings services associated with global commerce together under one roof, the World Trade Center complex in New York City being the most popular and largest of them.

== List ==
Country/Territory	City	Building title	Status	Ref
Afghanistan	Kabul	World Trade Center Kabul		
Algeria	Algiers	World Trade Center Algiers		
Angola	Luanda	World Trade Center Luanda		
Argentina	Buenos Aires	World Trade Center Buenos Aires		
Argentina	Rosario	World Trade Center Rosario		
Australia	Melbourne	WTC Wharf	Formerly named as WTC	
Bahrain	Manama	Bahrain World Trade Center		
Bangladesh	Chittagong	World Trade Center Chittagong		
Belgium	Antwerp	World Trade Center Antwerp Flanders		
Belgium	Brussels	World Trade Center (Brussels)		
Belgium	Ghent	World Trade Center International Club of Flanders		
Brazil	Belo Horizonte	World Trade Center Belo Horizonte		
Brazil	Contagem	Contagem World Trade Center	Under construction	
Brazil	Cuiabá	Cuiabá World Trade Center		
Brazil	Curitiba	World Trade Center Curitiba		
Brazil	Fortaleza	World Trade Center Fortaleza		
Brazil	Goiânia	Goiânia Downtown World Trade Center		
Brazil	Manaus	Amazon World Trade Center Manaus		
Brazil	Osasco	World Trade Center Osasco		
Brazil	Porto Alegre	World Trade Center Porto Alegre		
Brazil	Presidente Prudente	World Trade Center Presidente Prudente		
Brazil	Recife	Millennium World Trade Center Recife		
Brazil	Rio de Janeiro	World Trade Center Rio de Janeiro		
Brazil	São José dos Campos	World Trade Center São José dos Campos		
Brazil	São Paulo	SP International World Trade Center		
Brazil	Uberlândia	Uberlândia City World Trade Center		
Bulgaria	Sofia	Bulgarian Chamber of Commerce and Industry		
Bulgaria	Sofia	Interpred World Trade Center Sofia		
Canada	Edmonton	World Trade Centre Edmonton		
Canada	Halifax	World Trade and Convention Centre		
Canada	Montreal	World Trade Centre Montreal		
Canada	Saskatoon	World Trade Centre Saskatoon		
Canada	Toronto	World Trade Centre (Toronto)		
Canada	Vancouver	World Trade Centre Vancouver		
Canada	Winnipeg	World Trade Centre Winnipeg		
Cape Verde	Praia	World Trade Center Praia		
Chile	Santiago	World Trade Center Santiago		
China	Beijing	The China World Trade Center		
China	Beijing	World Trade Center Beijing CCPIT		
China	Binzhou	World Trade Center Binzhou		
China	Changzhou	World Trade Center Changzhou		
China	Chongqing	Chongqing World Trade Center		
China	Ordos	World Trade Center Erdos		
China	Guangzhou	World Trade Center Guangzhou CCPIT		
China	Haikou	World Trade Center Haikou		
China	Hangzhou	World Trade Center Hangzhou		
China	Kunming	World Trade Center Kunming		
China	Nanjing	World Trade Center Nanjing		
China	Nansha	World Trade Center Pearl River Delta		
China	Qingdao	World Trade Center Qingdao		
China	Quanzhou	Quanzhou World Trade Center		
China	Shanghai	World Trade Center Shanghai		
China	Shenyang	World Trade Center Shenyang		
China	Shenzhen	Shenzhen World Trade Centre		
China	Tianjin	World Trade Center Tianjin		
China	Wenzhou	Wenzhou World Trade Center		
China	Wuxi	World Trade Center Wuxi		
China	Xi'an	World Trade Center Xi'an		
China	Xuzhou	World Trade Center Xuzhou		
China	Yiwu	World Trade Center Yiwu		
China	Zhejiang	World Trade Center Zhejiang		
China	Zhengzhou	World Trade Center Zhengzhou		
China	Zibo	World Trade Center Zibo		
Colombia	Barranquilla	World Trade Center Barranquilla		
Colombia	Bogotá	World Trade Center Bogotá		
Colombia	Cali	World Trade Center Cali		
Colombia	Cartagena	World Trade Center Cartagena		
Costa Rica	San José	World Trade Center San Jose		
Croatia	Zagreb	World Trade Center Zagreb		
Cuba	Havana	World Trade Center Havana		
Curaçao	Willemstad	World Trade Center Curaçao		
Cyprus	Limassol	World Trade Center Cyprus		
Czech Republic	Plzeň	World Trade Center Pilsen		
Denmark	Copenhagen	World Trade Center (Copenhagen)	Proposed	
Denmark	Ballerup	World Trade Center Ballerup		
Dominican Republic	Santo Domingo	World Trade Center Santo Domingo		
Ecuador	Guayaquil	World Trade Center Guayaquil		
Ecuador	Quito	World Trade Center Quito		
Egypt	Cairo	World Trade Center Cairo		
El Salvador	San Salvador	World Trade Center San Salvador		
Estonia	Tallinn	World Trade Center Tallinn		
Finland	Helsinki	World Trade Center (Helsinki)		
Finland	Vantaa	World Trade Center Helsinki - Vantaa Airport		
Finland	Turku	World Trade Center (Turku)		
France	Grenoble	World Trade Center of Grenoble		
France	Le Havre	World Trade Center Le Havre		
France	Lille	World Trade Center Lille		
France	Lyon	World Trade Center Lyon		
France	Marseille	World Trade Center Marseille		
France	Metz	World Trade Center Metz-Saarbrücken		
France	Nantes	World Trade Center Nantes		
France	Nice	World Trade Center Nice		
France	Paris	World Trade Center Paris		
France	Poitiers	World Trade Center Poitiers		
France	Rennes	World Trade Center Rennes		
France	Strasbourg	World Trade Center Strasbourg		
Germany	Bremen	World Trade Center Bremen		
Germany	Cologne	World Trade Center Koeln		
Germany	Dresden	World Trade Center Dresden		
Germany	Düsseldorf	World Trade Center Düsseldorf		
Germany	Frankfurt (Oder)	World Trade Center Frankfurt (Oder)		
Germany	Hamburg	World Trade Center Hamburg		
Germany	Hamburg	Hanseatic Trade Center		
Germany	Kiel	World Trade Center Kiel		
Germany	Rostock	World Trade Center Rostock		
Germany	Ruhr Valley	World Trade Center Ruhr Valley		
Germany	Stuttgart	World Trade Center Stuttgart		
Georgia	Tbilisi]]	World Trade Center Tbilisi		
Ghana	Accra	World Trade Center Accra		
Gibraltar	Gibraltar	World Trade Center Gibraltar		
Honduras	San Pedro Sula	World Trade Center San Pedro Sula		
Hong Kong	Hong Kong	World Trade Centre Club Hong Kong, World Trade Centre Hong Kong		
Hong Kong	Hong Kong	World Trade Center Hong Kong International Airport		
Hungary	Budapest	World Trade Center Budapest		
India	Ahmedabad	World Trade Center Ahmedabad	Functional	
India	Amritsar	World Trade Center Amritsar	Upcoming proposal	
India	Bangalore	World Trade Center Bangalore	Functional	
India	Bhubaneswar	World Trade Center Bhubaneswar	Under Construction	
India	Chandigarh	World Trade Center Chandigarh	Under construction	
India	Chennai	World Trade Center Chennai	Functional	
India	Delhi/Gurgaon	World Trade Center Delhi	Functional	
India	Faridabad	World Trade Center Faridabad	Under construction	
India	Gandhinagar	World Trade Center Gandhinagar	Upcoming proposal	
India	GIFT City	World Trade Centre GIFT City	Functional	
India	Goa	World Trade Center Goa	Under construction	
India	Hyderabad	World Trade Centre Hyderabad	Under construction	
India	Jaipur	World Trade Center Jaipur	Functional	
India	Kochi	World Trade Center Kochi	Functional	
India	Kolkata	World Trade Centre Kolkata	Under construction	
India	Mumbai	World Trade Centre, Mumbai	Functional	
India	Navi Mumbai	World Trade Centre Navi Mumbai		
India	New Delhi	World Trade Center New Delhi	Functional	
India	Noida	World Trade Centre Noida		
India	Pune	World Trade Centre Pune	Functional	
India	Surat	World Trade Centre Surat	Functional	
India	Thane	World Trade Center Thane	Under construction	
India	Thiruvananthapuram	World Trade Centre Thiruvananthapuram	Proposed (MoU signed)	
India	Visakhapatnam	World Trade Centre AMTZ	Functional	
India	Visakhapatnam	World Trade Centre Visakhapatnam	Under construction	
Indonesia	Jakarta	World Trade Center Jakarta		
Indonesia	Surabaya	World Trade Center Surabaya		
Iran	Karaj	World Trade Center Karaj		
Iran	Shiraz	World Trade Center Shiraz		
Iran	Tabriz	World Trade Center Tabriz		
Iran	Qazvin	World Trade Center Qazvin		
Iraq	Baghdad	World Trade Center Baghdad		
Iraq	Basra	World Trade Center Basra		
Ireland	Dublin	World Trade Center Dublin		
Israel	Tel Aviv	World Trade Center Tel-Aviv		
Italy	Brescia	World Trade Center Brescia - East Lombardy		
Italy	Genoa	World Trade Center Genoa		
Italy	Messina	World Trade Center Messina		
Italy	Milan	World Trade Center Milano		
Italy	Milan	World Trade Center Malpensa Airport		
Italy	Modena	World Trade Center Modena		
Italy	Pescara	World Trade Center Pescara		
Italy	Rome	World Trade Center Rome		
Italy	Salsomaggiore	World Trade Center Salsomaggiore		
Italy	Trieste	World Trade Center Trieste		
Italy	Verona	World Trade Center Verona		
Japan	Okinawa	World Trade Center Okinawa		
Japan	Osaka	Osaka Prefectural Government Sakishima Building	Formerly World Trade Center (Osaka), 1995–2010	
Japan	Tokyo	World Trade Center (Tokyo)		
Jordan	Amman	World Trade Center Amman		
Jordan	Aqaba	World Trade Center Aqaba		
Jordan	Dead Sea	World Trade Center Dead Sea		
Kazakhstan	Almaty	World Trade Center Almaty		
Kazakhstan	Astana	World Trade Center Astana		
Kosovo	Pristina	World Trade Center Pristina		
Kuwait	Kuwait City	World Trade Center Kuwait		
Latvia	Riga	World Trade Center Riga		
Lebanon	Beirut	World Trade Center Beirut		
Libya	Benghazi	World Trade Center Benghazi		
Libya	Tripoli	World Trade Center Tripoli		
Luxembourg	Luxembourg	World Trade Center Luxembourg		
Macau	Macau	World Trade Center (Macau)		
Malaysia	Kuala Lumpur	World Trade Centre Kuala Lumpur	Formerly known as Putra World Trade Centre (PWTC)	
Malaysia	Penang	World Trade Center Penang		
Malta	Malta	World Trade Center Malta		
Mauritius	Port Louis	World Trade Center Port Louis		
Mexico	Boca del Río	World Trade Center Veracruz		
Mexico	Cancún	World Trade Center Cancún		
Mexico	Cuernavaca	World Trade Center Cuernavaca (Morelos)		
Mexico	Culiacán	World Trade Center Culiacán (Sinaloa)		
Mexico	Guadalajara	World Trade Center Guadalajara		
Mexico	Juárez	World Trade Center El Paso / Juarez		
Mexico	Mexico City	World Trade Center Mexico City		
Mexico	Monterrey	World Trade Center Monterrey (Nuevo León)		
Mexico	Querétaro	World Trade Center Querétaro		
Mexico	San Luis Potosí	World Trade Center San Luis Potosí		
Mexico	Tijuana	World Trade Center Tijuana		
Mexico	Toluca	World Trade Center Toluca		
Monaco	Monte Carlo	World Trade Center Monte Carlo (Monaco)		
Mongolia	Ulaanbaatar	World Trade Center Ulaanbaatar		
Montenegro	Podgorica	World Trade Center Podgorica		
Morocco	Casablanca	World Trade Center Casablanca		
Nepal	Kathmandu	United World Trade Center		
Netherlands	Almere	World Trade Center Almere		
Netherlands	Amsterdam	World Trade Center (Amsterdam)		
Netherlands	Amsterdam	World Trade Center Amsterdam Schiphol Airport		
Netherlands	Arnhem	World Trade Center Arnhem Nijmegen		
Netherlands	Breda	World Trade Center Breda - SW Brabant		
Netherlands	Eindhoven	World Trade Center Eindhoven		
Netherlands	The Hague	World Trade Center The Hague		
Netherlands	Heerlen	World Trade Center Heerlen - Aachen		
Netherlands	Hengelo	World Trade Center Twente		
Netherlands	Leeuwarden	World Trade Center Leeuwarden		
Netherlands	Rotterdam	Beurs-World Trade Center		
Netherlands	Utrecht	World Trade Center Utrecht		
Netherlands	Venlo	World Trade Center Venlo		
Nicaragua	Managua	World Trade Center Managua		
Nigeria	Abuja	World Trade Center Abuja		
Nigeria	Lagos	World Trade Center Lagos		
Norway	Oslo	World Trade Center Oslo		
Oman	Muscat	World Trade Center Muscat		
Pakistan	Islamabad	World Trade Center, Islamabad		
Pakistan	Lahore	Lahore World Trade Center		
Pakistan	Karachi	World Trade Center Karachi		
Palestine	Ramallah	World Trade Center Ramallah		
Panama	Panama	World Trade Center Panama		
Paraguay	Asunción	World Trade Center Asunción		
Paraguay	Ciudad del Este	World Trade Center Ciudad del Este	Under construction	
Peru	Lima	World Trade Center Lima		
Philippines	Pasay	World Trade Center Metro Manila		
Poland	Gdynia	World Trade Center Gdynia		
Poland	Poznań	World Trade Center Poznań		
Poland	Warsaw	World Trade Center Warsaw		
Portugal	Lisbon	Centro de Escritórios do Campo Alegre		
Portugal	Porto	World Trade Center Porto		
Puerto Rico	San Juan	World Trade Center San Juan		
Qatar	Doha	World Trade Center Doha		
Romania	Bucharest	Bucharest World Trade Center		
Romania	Constanța	World Trade Center Constanța		
Romania	Iași	World Trade Center Iași		
Russia	Chelyabinsk	World Trade Center Chelyabinsk		
Russia	Krasnodar	World Trade Center Krasnodar		
Russia	Krasnoyarsk	World Trade Center Krasnoyarsk		
Russia	Moscow	World Trade Center Moscow		
Russia	Nizhny Novgorod	World Trade Center Nizhny Novgorod		
Russia	Saint Petersburg	World Trade Center Saint Petersburg		
Russia	Yekaterinburg	World Trade Center Yekaterinburg		
San Marino	Serravalle	World Trade Center, San Marino		
Saudi Arabia	Mecca	World Trade Center Mecca		
Saudi Arabia	Jeddah	World Trade Center Jeddah		
Saudi Arabia	Khobar	World Trade Center Al Khobar		
Saudi Arabia	Riyadh	World Trade Center Riyadh		
Senegal	Dakar	World Trade Center Dakar		
Serbia	Belgrade	World Trade Center Belgrade		
Singapore	Singapore	HarbourFront Centre (Singapore)	Formerly World Trade Center Singapore, 1977–2003	
Slovakia	Bratislava	World Trade Center Bratislava		
Slovenia	Ljubljana	World Trade Center Ljubljana		
Spain	Barcelona	World Trade Center Barcelona		
Spain	Bilbao	World Trade Center Bilbao		
Spain	Córdoba	World Trade Center Córdoba		
Spain	Cornellà de Llobregat	World Trade Center Almeda Park		
Spain	Girona	World Trade Center Girona		
Spain	Igualada	World Trade Center Igualada		
Spain	Las Palmas	World Trade Center Las Palmas		
Spain	Lleida	World Trade Center Lleida		
Spain	Madrid	World Trade Center Madrid	Officially called Cuatro Torres Business Area	
Spain	Ourense	World Trade Center Orense		
Spain	Tenerife	World Trade Center Tenerife		
Spain	Santander	World Trade Center Santander		
Spain	Seville	World Trade Center (Seville)		
Spain	Valencia	World Trade Center Valencia	Officially called Sorolla Trade Center	
Spain	Vigo	World Trade Center Vigo		
Spain	Zaragoza	World Trade Center (Zaragoza)		
South Africa	Cape Town	World Trade Center Cape Town		
South Africa	Johannesburg	World Trade Center Johannesburg		
South Korea	Daejeon	World Trade Center Daejeon		
South Korea	Seoul	World Trade Center Seoul		
South Korea	Suwon	Gyeonggi World Trade Center Suwon		
Sri Lanka	Colombo	World Trade Center, Colombo		
Sweden	Gothenburg	World Trade Center Göteborg		
Sweden	Helsingborg	World Trade Center Helsingborg		
Sweden	Karlskrona	World Trade Center Karlskrona		
Sweden	Lund	World Trade Center Lund		
Sweden	Malmö	World Trade Center Malmö		
Sweden	Stockholm	World Trade Center Stockholm		
Sweden	Växjö	World Trade Center Växjö	Under construction	
Switzerland	Geneva	World Trade Center Geneva		
Switzerland	Lausanne	World Trade Center Lausanne		
Switzerland	Lugano	World Trade Center Lugano		
Switzerland	Zurich	World Trade Center Zurich		
Syria	Aleppo	World Trade Center Aleppo		
Syria	Damascus	World Trade Center Damascus		
Taiwan	Kaohsiung	Kaohsiung Exhibition Center	Original name: World Trade Center Kaohsiung	
Taiwan	Taichung	World Trade Center Taichung		
Taiwan	Taipei	Taipei World Trade Center		
Thailand	Bangkok	Empire Tower 1		
Turkey	Ankara	Ankara World Trade Center		
Turkey	Istanbul	World Trade Center Istanbul		
Turkey	Trabzon	World Trade Center Trabzon	Under development by Armada Group	
Ukraine	Kyiv	World Trade Center Kyiv		
United Arab Emirates	Abu Dhabi	World Trade Center Abu Dhabi		
United Arab Emirates	Ajman	World Trade Center Ajman		
United Arab Emirates	Dubai	Dubai World Trade Centre		
United Arab Emirates	Ras al-Khaimah	World Trade Center Ras Al Khaimah		
United Arab Emirates	Sharjah	World Trade Center Sharjah		
United Kingdom	Belfast	World Trade Centre Belfast		
United Kingdom	Edinburgh	World Trade Centre Edinburgh		
United Kingdom	Glasgow	World Trade Centre Glasgow		
United Kingdom	Kingston upon Hull	World Trade Centre Hull & Humber		
United Kingdom	London	World Trade Centre (London)	Destroyed: 1996 Docklands bombing	
United Kingdom	Milton Keynes	World Trade Centre Milton Keynes		
United Kingdom	Southampton	World Trade Centre Southampton		
United States	Albany	Capital Region World Trade Center		
United States	Anchorage	World Trade Center Alaska/Anchorage		
United States	Baltimore	Baltimore World Trade Center		
United States	Birmingham	WTC Birmingham		
United States	Boston	Seaport Hotel and Seaport World Trade Center		
United States	Buffalo	World Trade Center Buffalo Niagara		
United States	Chicago	Chicago World Trade Center	Proposed	
United States	Dallas	World Trade Center Dallas		
United States	Denver	Denver World Trade Center		
United States	Detroit	World Trade Center Detroit/Windsor		
United States	Fort Lauderdale	World Trade Center Fort Lauderdale		
United States	Harrisburg	World Trade Center Harrisburg		
United States	Harrison	World Trade Center Harrison		
United States	Honolulu	World Trade Center Honolulu		
United States	Houston	World Trade Center Houston		
United States	Indianapolis	World Trade Center Indianapolis		
United States	Jackson	World Trade Center Jackson		
United States	Kansas City	World Trade Center Kansas City		
United States	Kingsport	World Trade Center Kingsport		
United States	Las Vegas	World Trade Center Las Vegas		
United States	Lexington	World Trade Center (Lexington)		
United States	Long Beach	One World Trade Center (Long Beach)		
United States	Los Angeles	World Trade Center (Los Angeles)		
United States	McAllen	World Trade Center McAllen		
United States	Memphis	World Trade Center Memphis		
United States	Miami	World Trade Center Miami		
United States	Milwaukee	World Trade Center Milwaukee		
United States	Missoula	World Trade Center Missoula		
United States	New Orleans	World Trade Center New Orleans		
United States	New York City	World Trade Center (1973–2001)	Destroyed in the September 11 attacks	
United States	New York City	World Trade Center (2001–present)	Mostly completed. Rebuilding effort to replace the original World Trade Center complex that were destroyed in the September 11 attacks. See One World Trade Center	
United States	New York City	World Trade Center at the Hall of Nations, 1939 World's Fair	Demolished	
United States	Newark	World Trade Center Newark		
United States	Norfolk	Norfolk World Trade Center (1983-present)		
United States	Orlando	World Trade Center Orlando		
United States	Oxnard	World Trade Center Oxnard		
United States	Palm Beach	World Trade Center Palm Beach		
United States	Philadelphia	Renaissance Plaza		
United States	Pittsburgh	World Trade Center Pittsburgh		
United States	Portland	World Trade Center Portland		
United States	Providence	World Trade Center Providence		
United States	Richmond	World Trade Center Richmond		
United States	Rogers	Arkansas World Trade Center		
United States	Sacramento	World Trade Center Northern California		
United States	Salt Lake City	World Trade Center at City Creek		
United States	San Antonio	World Trade Center San Antonio		
United States	San Diego	World Trade Center San Diego		
United States	San Francisco	World Trade Center San Francisco		
United States	Savannah	World Trade Center Savannah		
United States	Seattle	World Trade Center Seattle		
United States	St. Louis	World Trade Center St. Louis		
United States	St. Paul	Wells Fargo Place	Formerly the Minnesota World Trade Center then sold and renamed	
United States	Tacoma	World Trade Center Tacoma		
United States	Tampa	World Trade Center Tampa Bay		
United States	Washington, D.C.	Ronald Reagan Building and International Trade Center		
United States	Wichita	Kansas World Trade Center		
United States	Wilmington	World Trade Center Delaware		
Uruguay	Montevideo	World Trade Center Montevideo		
Uruguay	Punta del Este	World Trade Center Punta del Este	In construction	
Venezuela	Barquisimeto	World Trade Center Barquisimeto		
Venezuela	Caracas	World Trade Center Caracas		
Venezuela	Maracaibo	World Trade Center Maracaibo		
Venezuela	Puerto la Cruz	World Trade Center Puerto La Cruz		
Venezuela	Puerto Ordaz	World Trade Center Puerto Ordaz		
Venezuela	Valencia	World Trade Center Valencia, Venezuela		
Vietnam	Da Nang	World Trade Center Danang	Only building from the project that was built was the Azura apartment building. The rest was sold for Vingroup to build Vincom Center Đà Nẵng and Vinhomes Condotel	
Vietnam	Hanoi	World Trade Center Hanoi		
Vietnam	Ho Chi Minh City	Sabeco World Trade Center	On hold; also known as World Trade Center Ho Chi Minh City then Saigon Mê Linh Tower	
Vietnam	Thủ Dầu Một	World Trade Center Binh Duong New City	The WTC Office Tower is completed. The WTC Gateway complex at the A1 roundabout is under construction, will have a central station here with a MRT line to connect with the Suoi Tien Terminal station.	
Yemen	Sanaa	World Trade Center Sana'a		

== Gallery ==
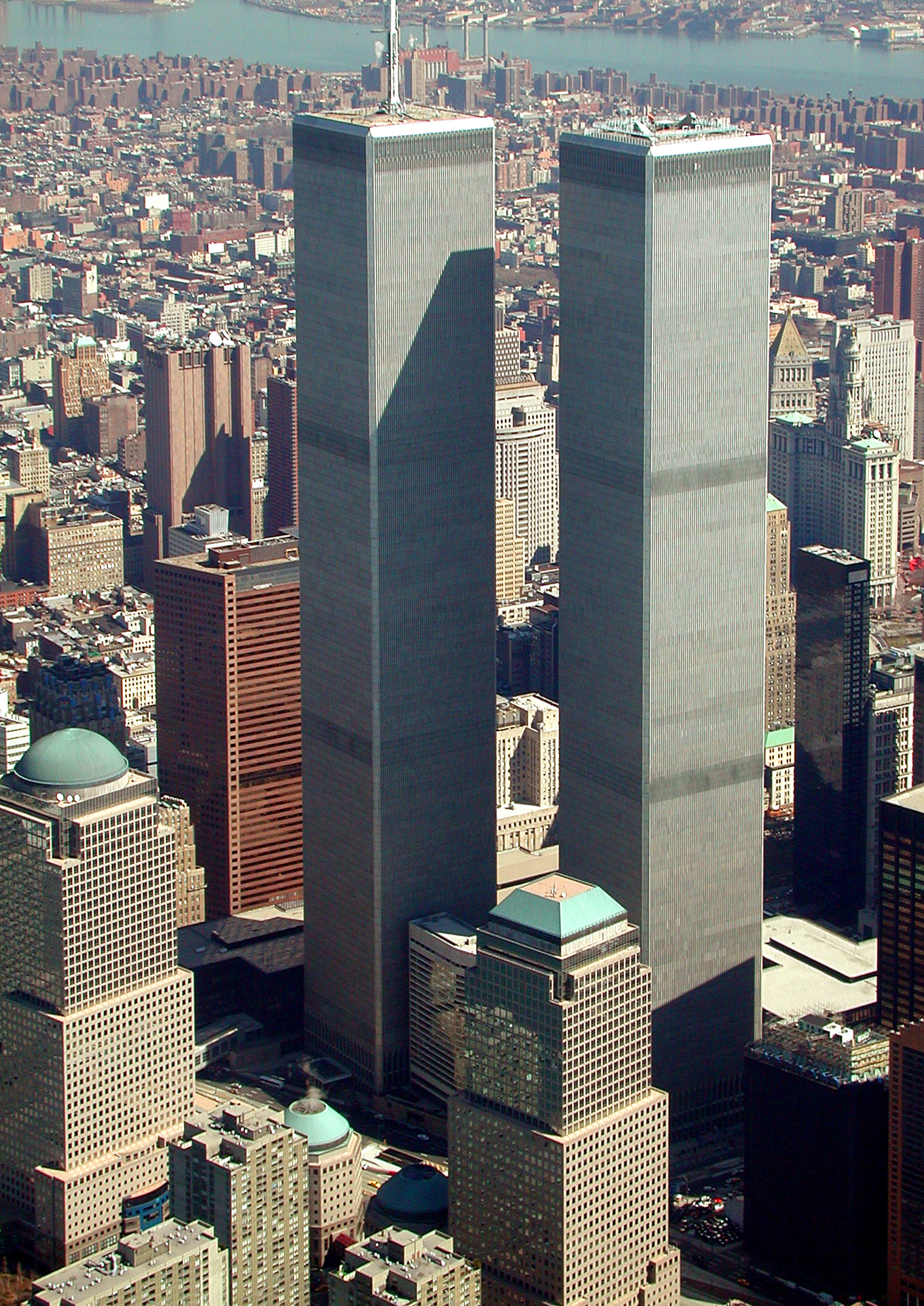
The World Trade Center in New York City before being attacked by terrorist group al-Qaeda in 2001 (see September 11 attacks)

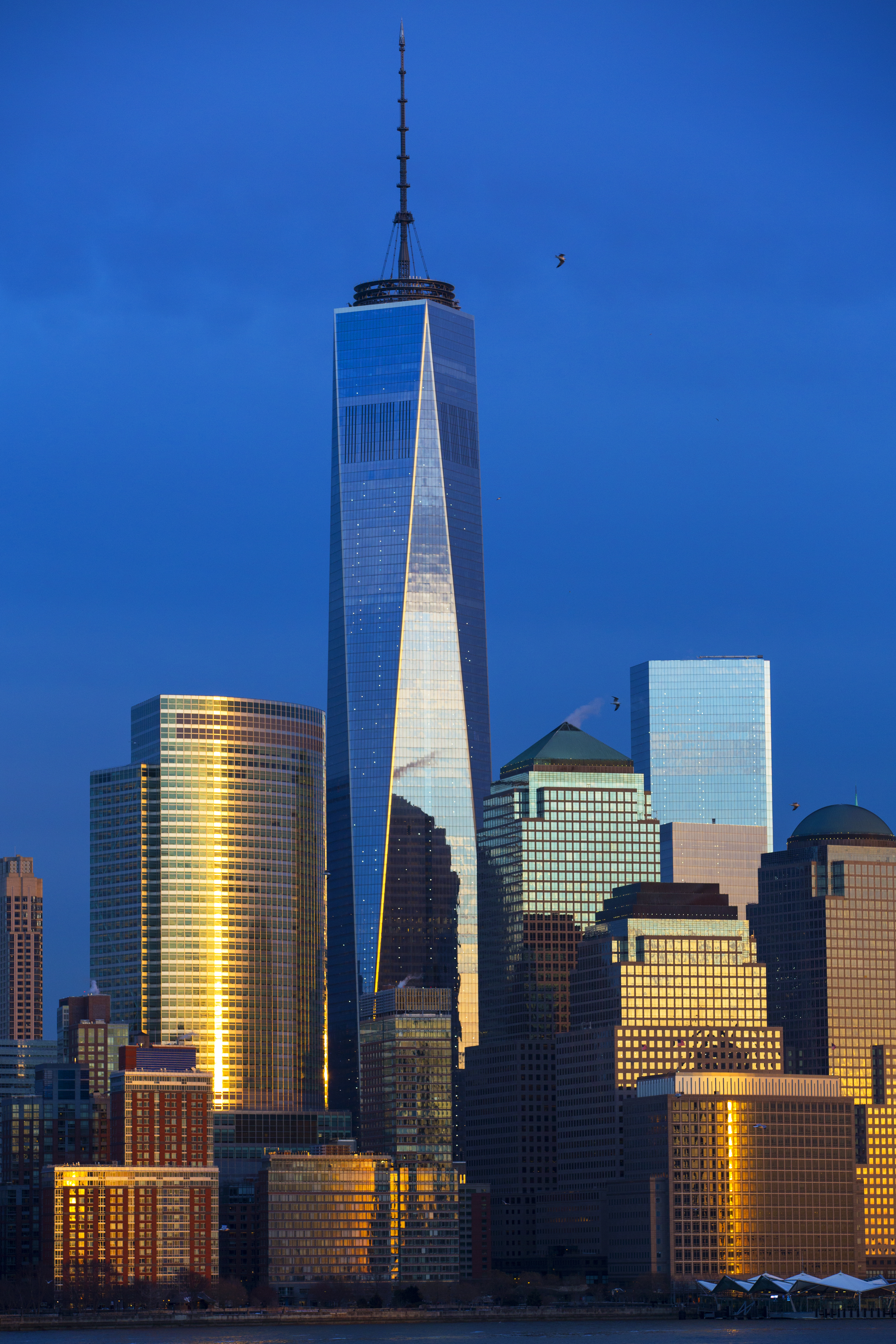
The One World Trade Center in New York City. Also known as the Freedom Tower.

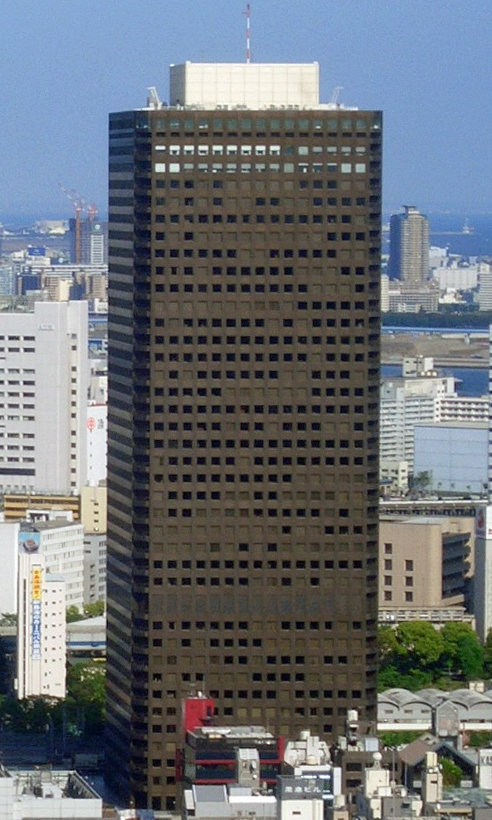
World Trade Center (Tokyo) in Tokyo, Japan

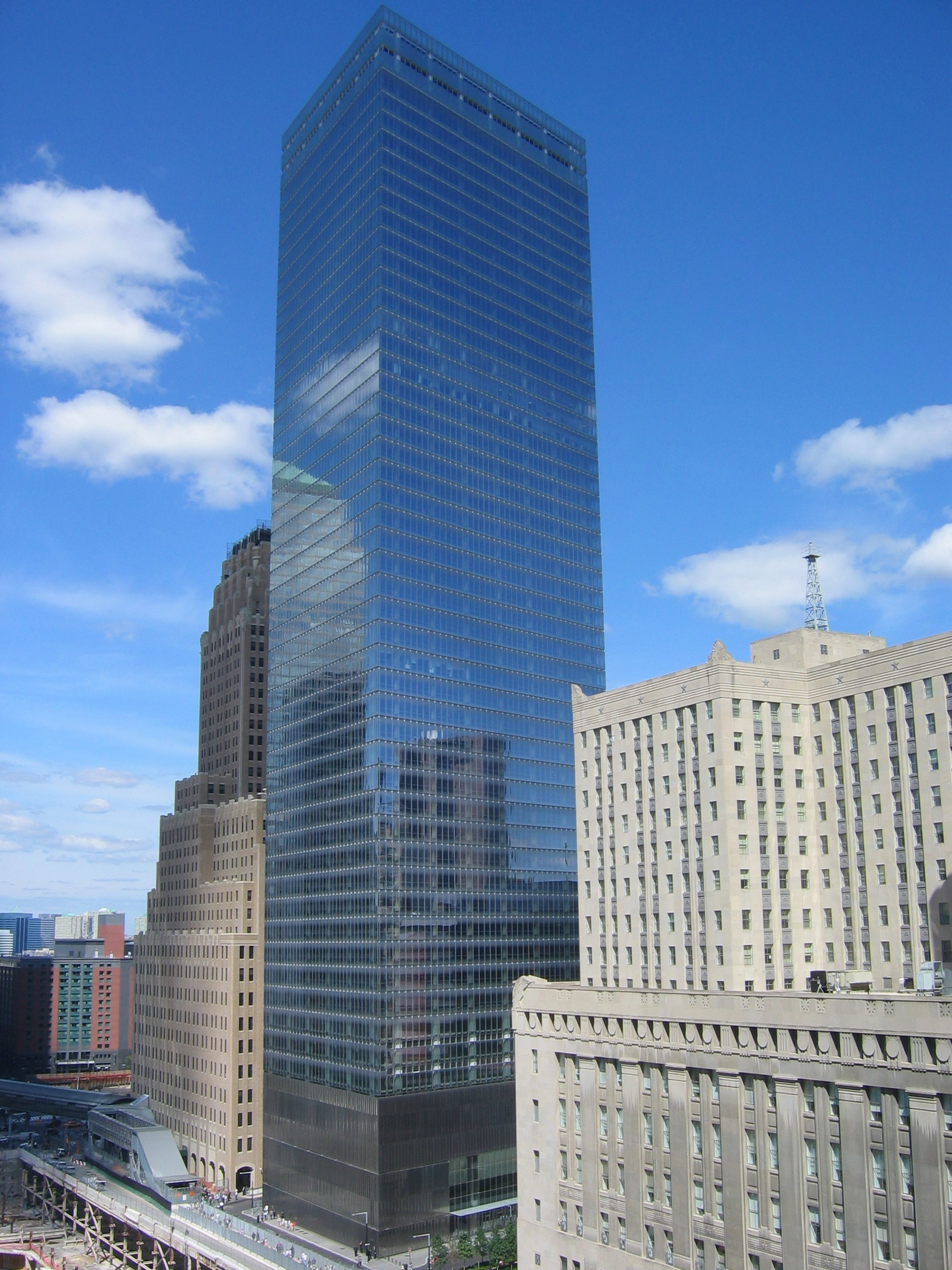
The current 7 World Trade Center in New York City

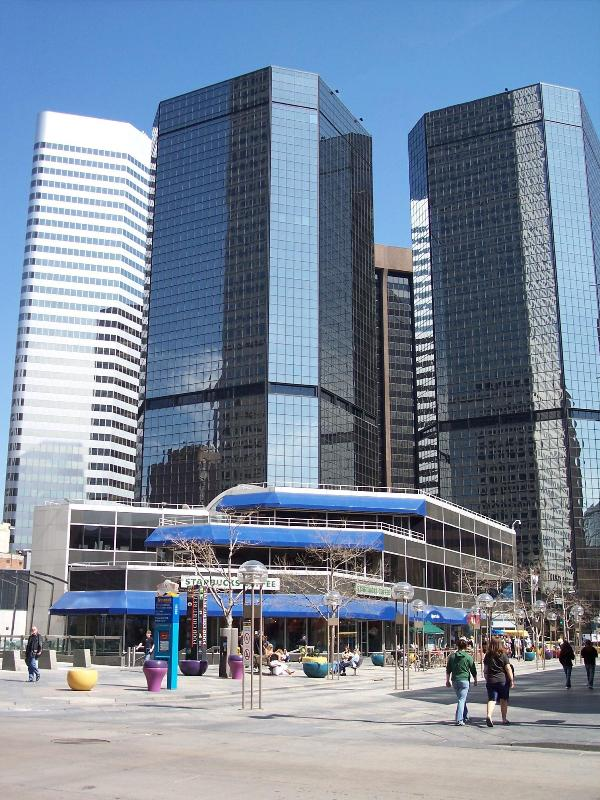
Denver World Trade Center in Denver, Colorado, United States

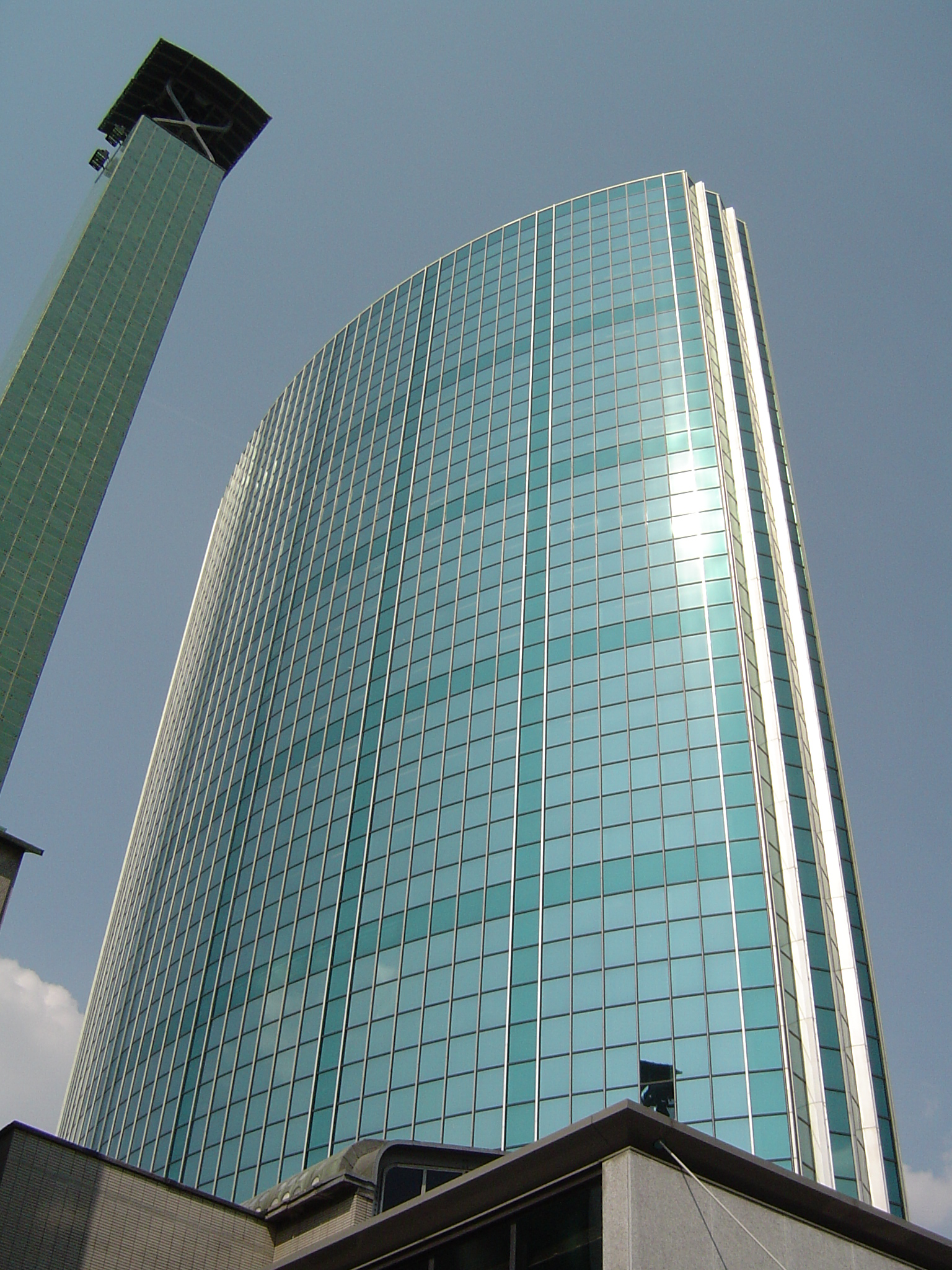
Beurs-World Trade Center in Rotterdam, Netherlands

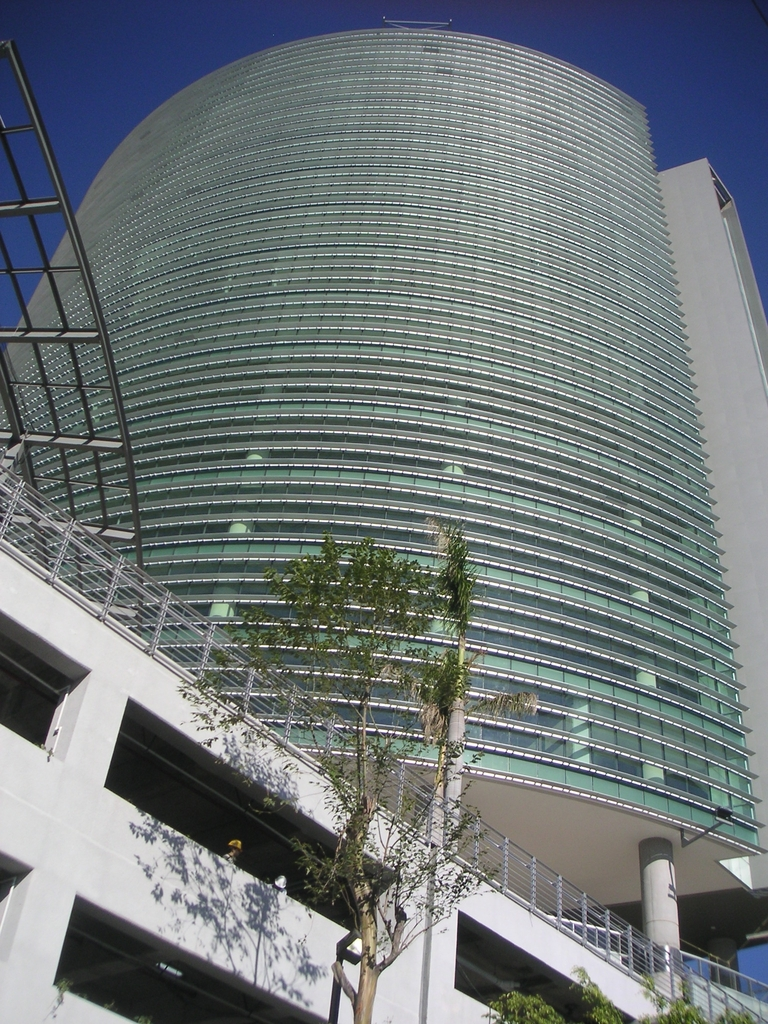
Torre Futura World Trade Center in San Salvador, El Salvador

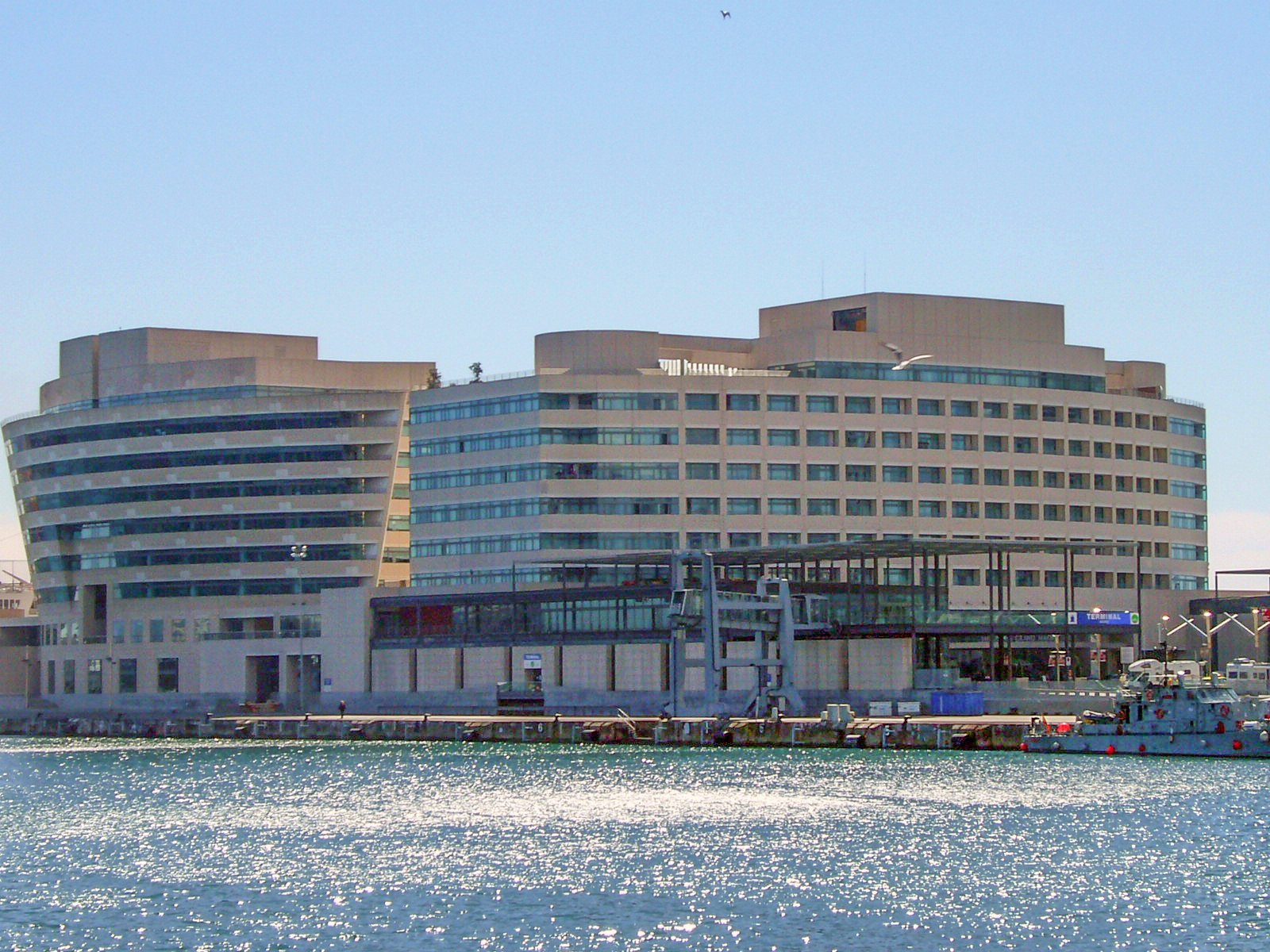
World Trade Center in Barcelona, Spain

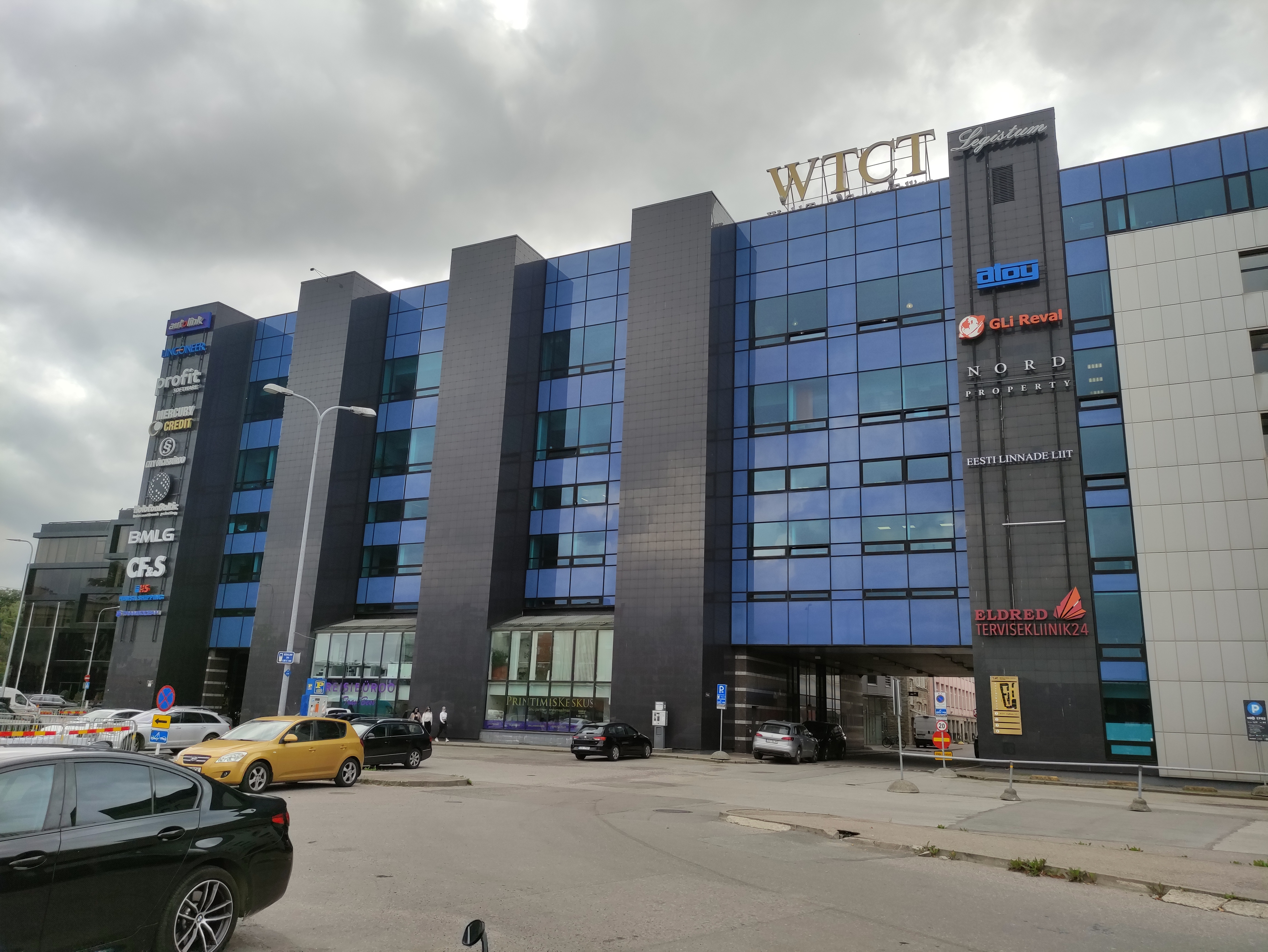
World Trade Center in Tallinn, Estonia

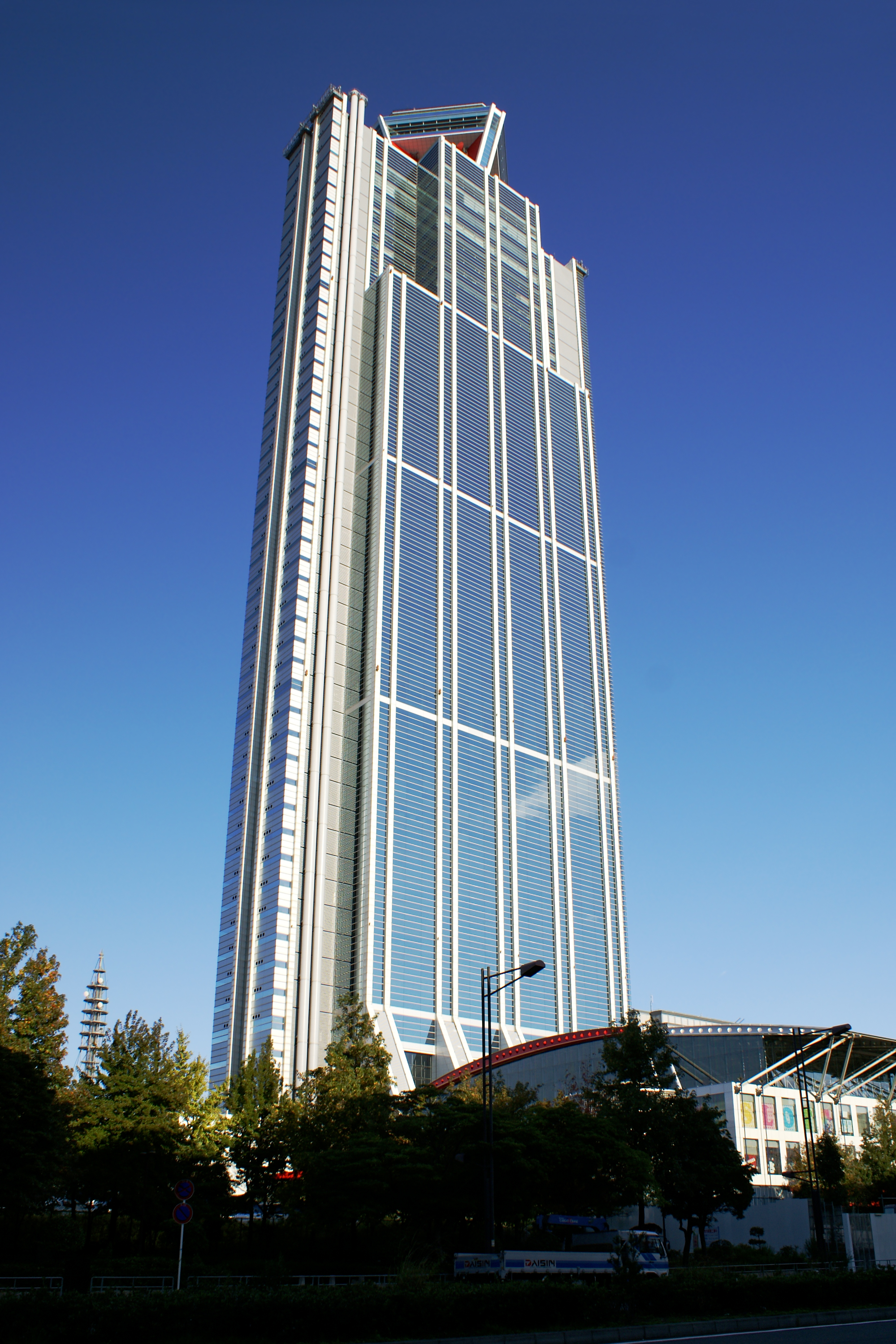
The Osaka Prefectural Government Sakishima Building in Japan

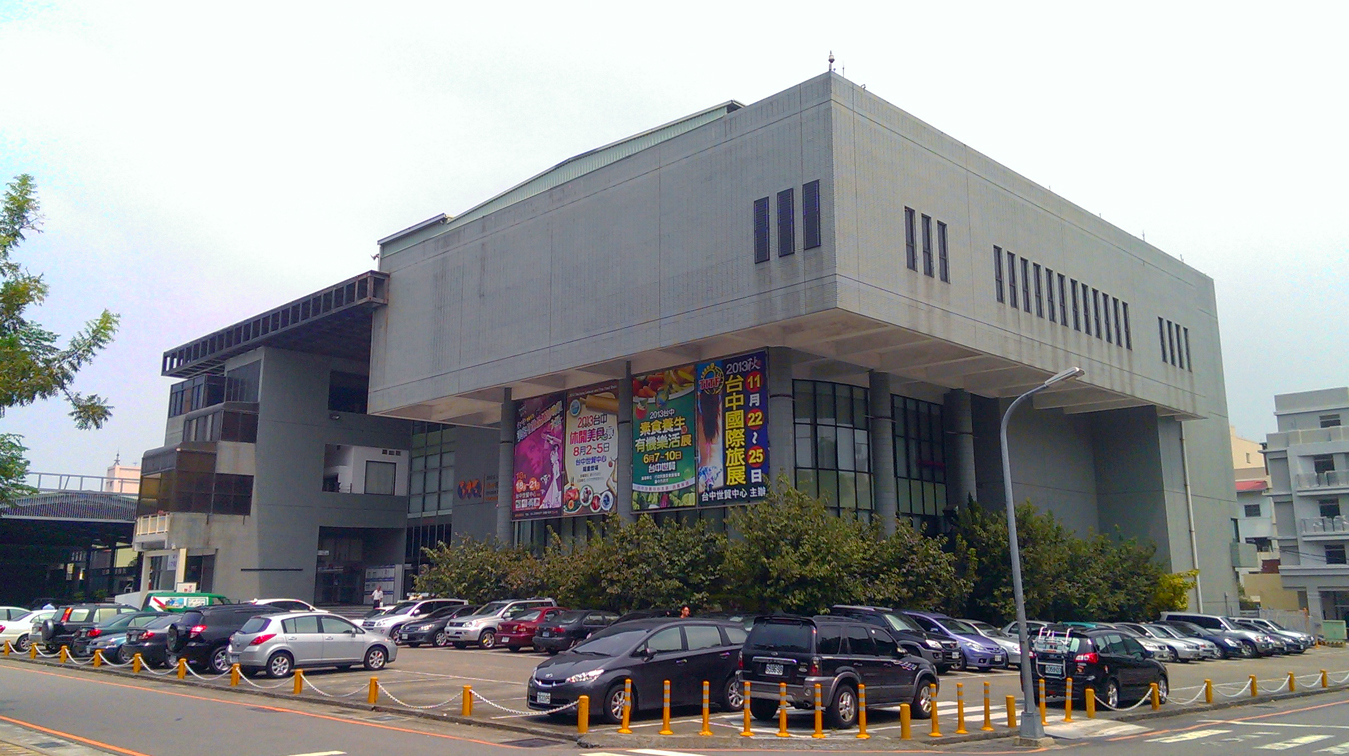
World Trade Center Taichung in Taichung, Taiwan

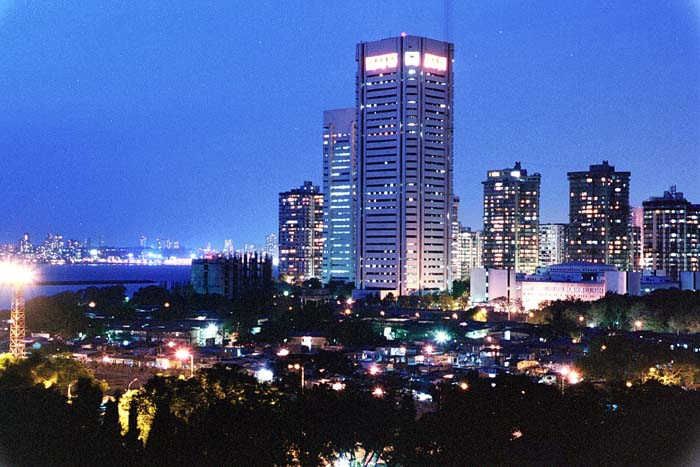
World Trade Centre Mumbai, in Mumbai, India

== See also ==
- List of tallest buildings and structures in the world
- List of twin buildings and structures
- World Trade Centers Association
- Category:World Trade Centers
