= World Trade Center of Grenoble =

- WTC of Grenoble.
- Interactive map of the World Trade Center of Grenoble area

General information
- Type: Business and Convention center
- Location: 5-7 place Robert Schuman Grenoble, France
- Coordinates: 45°11′27.9852″N 05°42′49.3992″E
- Opening: 8 July 1993
- Owner: Grenoble CCI / Schneider Electric / Novotel

Height
- Roof: 35 m (115 ft)

Technical details
- Floor area: 13 700 m²

Design and construction
- Architect: Claude Chautant

Website
- www.wtc-grenoble.com

The World Trade Center of Grenoble (WTC G) is one of the 12 World Trade Centers in France and one of 330 WTCs in the world. It is located in the heart of the Europole district of Grenoble. It is certified by the World Trade Centers Association (WTCA) since 1988. "The Silver Certification" has been given since 2008 corresponding to the new certification expectancies.

Localisation of WTC Grenoble

== Description ==
The World Trade Center of Grenoble has been a member of the World Trade Centers Association since 1988. Its aim is to promote international business, as well as encourage the development of its corporations. The Association numbers approximately 300 World Trade Centers members worldwide. The WTC of Grenoble offers 8 different services: trade information services; business services; trade education services; WTC club facilities; tenant services; group trade missions; exhibit facilities and conference facilities.

The World Trade Center of Grenoble, with its 9 floors, owns an auditorium, an atrium and 12 meeting rooms. The first floor hosts the WTC Club; Grex; EEN (Enterprise Europe Network), the second floor hosts SODIE; AGEFOS PME, the third floor hosts APEC; B-Lands Consulting, the fourth floor is a Business Center and the floors 6 to 9 hosts Schneider Electric.

It offers professional events including conventions, lectures and forums. As of 1 August 2013, the World Trade Center of Grenoble had hosted more than 183 events attended by 21,300 persons.

== History ==
In the 1980s, WTCs were only present in State Capitals, therefore Grenoble did not seem to be an option. Despite this major disadvantage, the city's CCI (Chamber of commerce) fought hard in order to make their application possible. The region's contribution to foreign trade and the work of Grenoble's international companies played an essential role. These elements allowed the city to get the licence delivered by the World Trade Centers Association (WTCA) in 1988. Five years later, in 1993, the building was operational and ready to host both the business and the congress center.

== Business Center ==
The Business Center of the WTC Grenoble is located on the fourth floor. It allows individuals to meet up their clients and partners and to initiate business ventures. It also has 15 equipped offices and a conference room (with a capacity of 6 people) available for clients to rent on a daily or yearly basis. It can also act as a business address, with or without headquarters, for businesses. The Business Center offers a number of services including a hotline service, high-speed internet, photocopies, fax, and a postal service.

== Convention Center ==
Convention Center of the WTC Grenoble

The Convention Center of the WTC Grenoble is located on the first and second floors. It regularly hosts meetings, seminars, conventions, conferences and exhibitions such as the Agile conference in 2012 or the IP - SoC (System on a chip) exhibition in 2013. The building includes modular rooms which can be adapted from 200 to 534 seats.

The two main group venues are:

- The Atrium, 1200m² adaptable for receptions, posters, exhibitions, breaks and dinners is considered as the heart of the Convention Center. With a direct access to the other rooms, it is also appreciated for its design and modularity.
- The Auditorium which is composed of 534 seats, 4 translation rooms and a 70m² stage. Additionally, 11 committee and meeting rooms (from 20 to 110 seats) and a videoconferencing room (up to 10 seats) are available in the WTC. Equipped with modern and high-performance audiovisual facilities, the Auditorium offers facilities for a wide range of events, conventions and performances.

== Grex ==
Grex offers guidance services to enterprises on an international level. They deliver market information, countries' regulations as well as main financial aid available to enterprises wanting to export. Its guidance is relying on Ubifrance and Chambres de Commerce et d'Industrie Françaises à l'Etranger (CCIFE)'s networks. It proposes diverse specific programs combining information, formation, counseling and guidance in foreign markets. These are adapted to international maturity and to the strategies of each business.

== See also ==
- List of world trade centers
- World Trade Centers Association
