= Puerto Rico World Trade Center =

Proposed building

Puerto Rico World Trade Center Building
- Alternative names: World Trade Center San Juan

General information
- Status: Never built
- Location: Isla Grande (Santurce)
- Town or city: San Juan, Puerto Rico
- Cost: $36 million
- Owner: Puerto Rico Convention Center
- Landlord: Urban Revitalization Group, Corp.
- Height: 248 ft (75.59 m) (planned)

Technical details
- Floor count: 10 (planned)

Design and construction
- Architect(s): V Architecture

Other information
- Parking: 500 parking spaces (planned)

Website
- WTCSanJuan

The Puerto Rico World Trade Center (PRWTC), also known as the World Trade Center San Juan (WTCSJ), was an unbuilt World Trade Center that was to be located in San Juan, Puerto Rico. Originally, the PRWTC was a program offered by the Puerto Rico Trade and Export Company, which held the license to operate the PRWTC brand, and the building would house it as well as many other facilities.

== History ==
=== First attempt ===
Originally conceived under governorship of Pedro Rosselló, the project would have been part of Americas World Trade District (AWTD), part of a larger Golden Triangle Project. The PRWTC would have been housed in two towers, and would be part of a $200 million Super Block project. This initial project would have been completed by late 2002, housing 210,000 ft^{2} of leasable space, "an international business club and an educational facility for local businesses." The PRWTC would be built in two phases, the first of which was supposed to last between 2000 and 2002.

=== Second attempt ===
Then-governor Aníbal Acevedo Vilá announced in his budget message for fiscal year 2007-2008 that the cornerstone for the PRWTC would be laid in that fiscal year.

=== Third attempt ===
This version of the project, which was announced during the governorship of Luis Fortuño, would cost $65 million.

=== Fourth attempt ===
The building was to serve as a world trade center, "[w]ith the mission of expanding the local and international commercial exchange" and "[sought] to promote economic development and commercial activity." It was "the first initiative for the construction of an office building in the Convention Center District" and with the then-ongoing construction of the Hyatt House nearby, was excepted to "expand revitalize" the area.

The project was announced on August 13, 2013, by the then-executive director of the Puerto Rico Convention District Authority, Víctor Suárez Meléndez, who had signed a long-term lease agreement with Urban Revitalization Group. The structure, which was going to be built in an area close to the Puerto Rico Convention Center, where the Hyatt Place Hotel now stands, would have stood at 248 ft and housed 216,000 ft^{2} (66,000 m^{2}) of office space, approximately 32,000 ft^{2} (10,000 m^{2}) of commercial space and 500 parking spaces. The PRWTC would be built through two phases, the first of which would be 100,000 ft^{2}, approximately 18,000 ft^{2} of commercial space and 156 parking spaces. Of the square footage, 25,000 ft^{2} would have been LEED-CS 2.0-certified by the U.S. Green Building Council. With an investment of $36 million, the building would end up housing "offices for economic exchange, commercial spaces, restaurants and exhibition space." The project "[would] have not feature[d] a memorial or have any ties to the former World Trade Center in New York. When originally announced, it was not known how long both the project and agreement would last. The building was to be designed by Jiménez + Rodríguez Barceló, now known as V Architecture.

The Puerto Rico Trade and Export Company would have offered "a wide range of services for businesses interested in internationalizing their products and services: business training, meeting rooms, local and international business missions and fairs, international business services and counseling, and the international business library" to small- and medium-sized enterprises at the PRWTC.

In the 2016 Puerto Rican general elections, the gubernatorial candidate, David Bernier, called for the development of the PRWTC as a "multisectorial public–private platform" to internationalize Puerto Rico in his party's platform.

== PRWTC Program ==
The PRWTC provides "access to the most innovative ideas in international business, international marketing channels, and the benefits and services of the World Trade Center Association." It is a membership-based organization, and runs under a manager, who between 2006 and 2011 was Ruth M. Claudio, who now labors at the Minority Business Development Agency.

In 2010, the PRWTC attracted 150 new members under the direction of then-Secretary of Economic Development and Commerce of Puerto Rico, José Pérez Riera.

The Interamerican University of Puerto Rico and the Puerto Rico Trade and Export Company signed an agreement to create the first student chapter of the World Trade Center, which would have an office at the university's Metro campus to permit students and would-be entrepreneurs have access to WTCA services .

In 1995, the International Museum Institute of New York's travelling Paleomania!: 4.6 Billion Years of Fossil History exhibition was placed at a site known as the World Trade Center, San Juan.
