= World Trade Center Tallinn =

Commercial building in Tallinn, Estonia

The World Trade Center Tallinn is a world trade center for financial companies and bureaus, located in central Tallinn, Estonia. The 14 buildings complex is located in Ahtri street close to the Old City Harbour and Old Town. World Trade Center Tallinn has been operating since 1994.

Full member of the World Trade Centers Association (WTCA) since 1995. It supports international trade, investment, and business development through services and facilities.

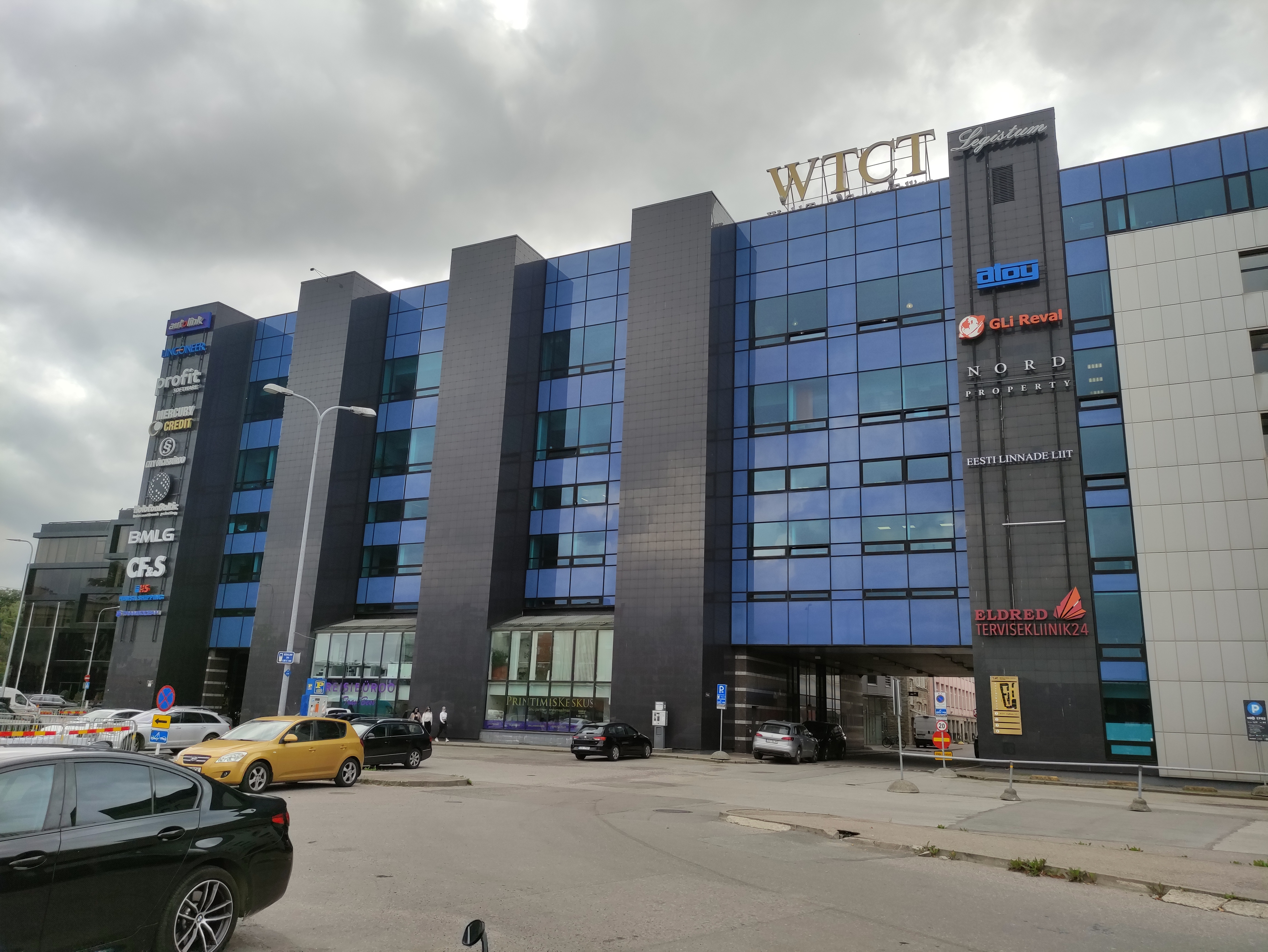
World Trade Center Tallinn

== See also ==
- List of World Trade Centers
- World Trade Centers Association
