= World Trade Center Bhubaneswar =

General information
- Status: Under construction
- Type: Commercial
- Location: Bhubaneswar, Odisha, India
- Coordinates: 20.3047°N 85.8541°E
- Completed: In Progress

Height
- Height: Expected to be 150m-160m according to number of floors

Technical details
- Floor count: 40
- Floor area: 98,340 m^{2} (1,058,500 sq ft)

Design and construction
- Developer: Populous

Website
- wtcbhubaneswar.org

World Trade Center Bhubaneswar (also known as WTC Bhubaneswar) is proposed to be a 40-floor-tall building in Bhubaneswar, Odisha, India. This will be the fifth World Trade Centre to be operationalized in India and the 344th in the world. It is developed by Populous (company). The center will consist of 200 room hotel, 50,000 sq ft of indoor exhibition hall, multipurpose convention hall to accommodate 4,000 delegates, small convertible meeting halls to host 12 to 16 events simultaneously, an open area to accommodate up to 25,000 people and an open amphitheater. Upon completion, the World Trade Center Bhubaneswar will be the tallest building in Odisha. The Convention Center will be connected to all nearby hotels and the World Trade Center through a skywalk. For now, the World Trade Center Bhubaneswar is functioning from IDCO Towers, in Janpath, Bhubaneswar.

== Initiatives and activities ==
- WTC Bhubaneswar, WORLD SKILL CENTER (2018) Corporate Social Responsibility Orientation Programme at Indian Oil Corporation Paradip
- WTC Bhubaneswar (2018) Celebration of International Women's Day
- WTC Bhubaneswar (2018) WTC Bhubaneswar at MSME Trade Fair
- WTC Bhubaneswar (2018) WTCB as Industry Interface for National Startup Week at Sri Sri University
- WTC Bhubaneswar (2018) WTC Budget Conclave with XIMB
- WTC Bhubaneswar (2018) WTC Bhubaneswar Partners with IT Conclave 2018
- WTC Bhubaneswar (2018) Industry Interaction Session on Business Opportunities with Republic of Uganda

== Media coverage ==
- Odisha Diary (2018) Indian Oil Corporation and WTC Organised CSR Orientation Programme in Paradip
- Odisha Diary (2018) Odisha Govt promoted the trade and business potentials of the State at Global Economic Summit-2018
- Odisha Diary (2018) World Trade Centre and XIMB to organize a budget review
- Navaratna News (2018) World Trade Centre Global Economic Summit-2018
- Odisha Diary (2018) World Trade Centre, Bhubaneswar Organises Social Entrepreneurship Workshop
- Odisha News Insight (2017) WTC felicitates Women Achievers
- Times of India (2017) World Trade Centre to be ready by 2019
- Symbiosis Institute of International Business (2015) Entrepreneurship Development Program (EDP)
- The Hindu (2014) World Trade Centre in Bhubaneswar expected to spur trade, tourism
- Information and Public Relations (I&PR) Department, Government of Odisha (2013)On Offing: World Trade Centre at Bhubaneswar

== See also ==
- List of world trade centers
- List of tallest buildings in Bhubaneswar
