= World Trade Center (Helsinki) =

Office building in Helsinki, Finland

Coordinates: 60°10′09″N 024°56′36″E

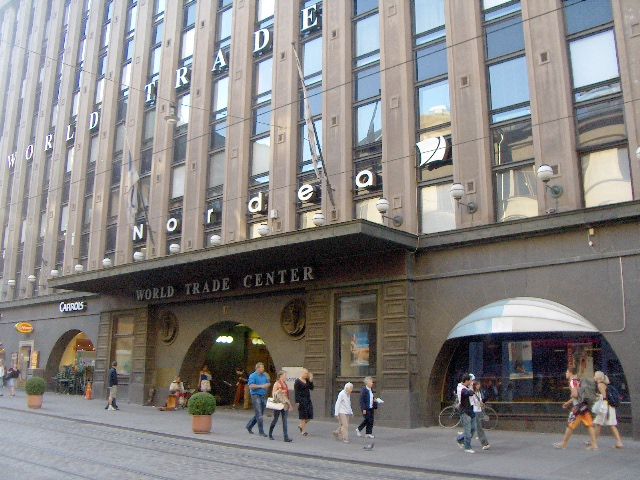
World Trade Center Helsinki

The World Trade Center Helsinki is a world trade center for financial companies and bureaus, located in central Helsinki, Finland. The building is located on Aleksanterinkatu very close to the main building of the University of Helsinki and to the Stockmann department store. On the first floor, the building houses a branch office of the Nordea bank, an Italian restaurant, and several bars.

The architect Pauli E. Blomstedt was just 26 when he won the competition for the design of the building for the Liittopankki (Federal Bank) in the Nordic Classicism style. It was completed in 1929.

== See also ==
- World Trade Center Turku
