= World Trade Center (Turku) =

Coordinates: 60°26′23″N 22°14′24″E

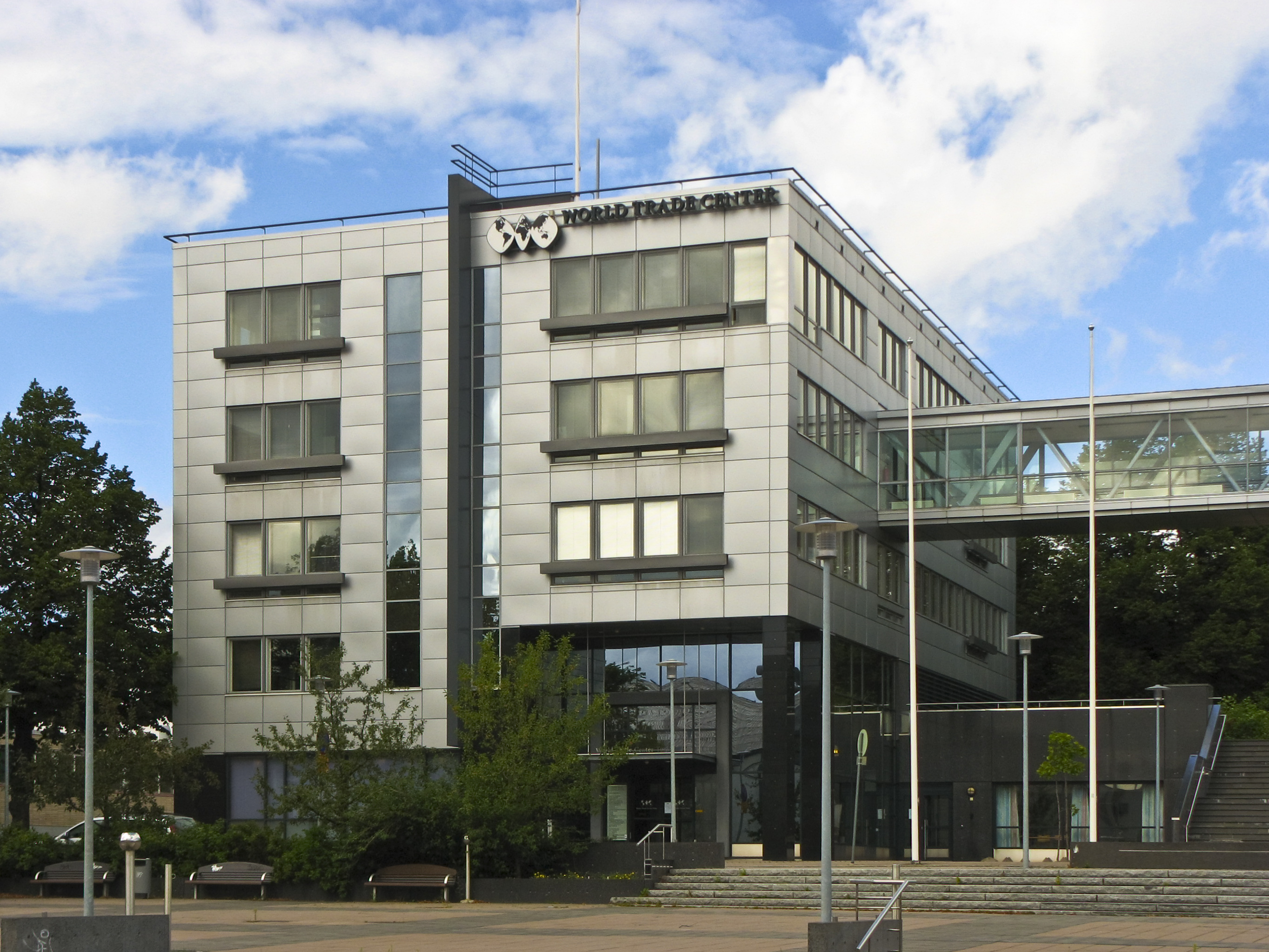
World Trade Center Turku

The World Trade Center Turku is a world trade center for financial companies and bureaus, located in central Turku, Finland. The building is located on Linnankatu. the WTC Turku is located within a walking distance to the Port of Turku. In 2018 WTC Turku will relocate to Kupittaa, in premises of Turku Science Park.

== See also ==
- World Trade Center Helsinki
