= Guy F. Tozzoli =

American businessman (1922–2013)

Guy Tozzoli
- Born: Guy Frederick Tozzoli; February 12, 1922; North Bergen, New Jersey, U.S.
- Died: February 2, 2013 (aged 90); Myrtle Beach, South Carolina, U.S.
- Education: Fordham University
- Spouse(s): Miriam Lane Johnson (divorced); Cynthia Tozzoli
- Children: Susan, Kathleen, Richard, William, Michael and Tom
- Parent(s): Silvio Tozzoli and Rose Tozzoli
- Engineering career
- Projects: World Trade Center

Guy Frederick Tozzoli (February 12, 1922 – February 2, 2013) was director of the World Trade Department of the Port of New York Authority in the 1960s. As such he was a driving force behind the development and building of the World Trade Center towers. Tozzoli was also a founder of the World Trade Centers Association, which fostered the development and operation of World Trade Centers globally. Tozzoli was the driving force from New York City, while his business associates Tadayoshi Yamada and Paul Fabry led the WTC effort in Tokyo and New Orleans respectively.

Tozzoli graduated from Fordham University and later served as a lieutenant in the United States Navy during World War II and the Korean War. Tozzoli joined the Port Authority in 1946. He was credited for hiring architect Minoru Yamasaki to design the World Trade Center complex which was dedicated in April, 1973. Tozzoli retired as Director of the World Trade Department for the Port Authority in 1987, but remained as president of the World Trade Centers Association until January 2011.

In 2013 it was disclosed that the Association benefited substantially from the "World Trade Center" name after the Port Authority of New York and New Jersey transferred to the Association in 1987 its local rights to the name for a token fee of $10. By licensing use of the name to its members, including World Trade Center-branded merchandise, the Association generated considerable revenue while absorbing the heavy costs of registering the name and defending it against improper use worldwide. The terms of the licensing arrangement were not widely publicized until 2013 when it became known that the Port Authority had supported the mission of the Association by providing rent-free space and other assistance, with Association staff serving as the trade assistance arm of the World Trade Center.

In recognition of his work to bring nations together under the Association's banner of Peace through Trade, Mr. Tozzoli was a multi-year nominee for the Nobel Peace Prize. His final annual salary with the Association was $513,000, in addition to his public pension of $113,000 yearly.
