= World Trade Center Tacoma =

Office building in Tacoma, Washington

Coordinates: 47.2536°N 122.4388°W

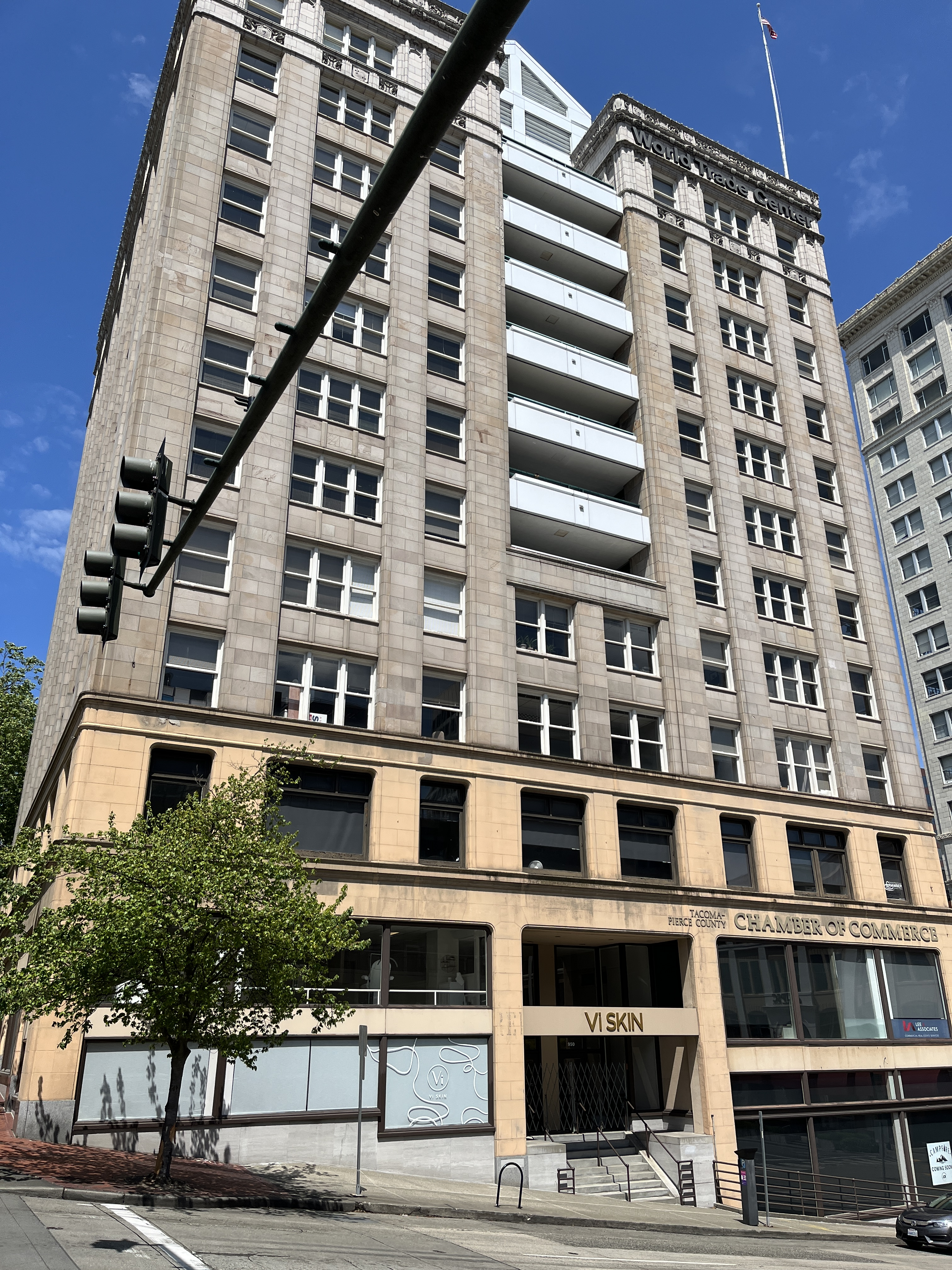

The World Trade Center Tacoma (WTCTA) is an office building and trade center in downtown Tacoma, Washington. The World Trade Center is affiliated with the World Trade Center Association and is considered the only full-service center in the Pacific Northwest.

The World Trade Center Association of Tacoma was established in 1970 and was renamed to the World Trade Center Tacoma after licensing was approved by the World Trade Center Association. The organization was originally headquartered on Port of Tacoma property, but moved in 2003 to the Rust Building in downtown Tacoma.

Since 2017, the trade center has been managed by the Tacoma-Pierce County Chamber of Commerce.
