= World Trade Center Thane =

Business complex in Maharashtra, India

World Trade Centre, Thane (WTC Thane) is a commercial and logistics complex under construction in Wagle Estate, Thane, Maharashtra, India. The project is licensed by the World Trade Centers Association (WTCA), it is planned to include India's tallest Urban Distribution Centre (UDC) as part of a mixed-use high-rise integrating Grade A office space, retail units, and customer experience zones.

== History and development ==
The development was announced in 2024 following a licensing agreement between Welspun One and the WTCA. The project carries an estimated investment of ₹800 crore (approximately US$103 million) and is described as a first-of-its-kind integrated facility in India. It is located in Wagle Estate, an established commercial and industrial area in Thane. The location was selected for its proximity to residential areas, corporate offices, and transport infrastructure.

WTC Thane is part of the World Trade Centers Association, a network of more than 300 World Trade Centers in nearly 100 countries. The design takes inspiration from vertical logistics facilities associated with other World Trade Centers in Singapore, Tokyo, and Hong Kong.

== Location ==
The complex is located in central Thane with direct access to the Eastern Express Highway and planned metro corridors. It is within a 30-minute travel radius of over 200,000 households and a comparable working population.
