= Populous Holdings =

Architectural firm

Populous Holdings, Inc.
- Industry: Architecture
- Founded: 2009; 17 years ago, (previously HOK Sports Venue Events)
- Founder: Earl Santee
- Headquarters: Kansas City; London; Brisbane
- Area served: Worldwide
- Key people: Bruce Miller (Global Chairman & CEO); Christopher Lee (Managing Director - EMEA and Global Head of Design); Richard Breslin (Managing Director - APAC); Jonathan Mallie (Managing Director - Americas)
- Services: Sports stadiums, arenas, aviation, conference and exhibition centres architecture, urban environments, event design, wayfinding and branded experiences
- Number of employees: 1500
- Website: populous.com

Populous Holdings, Inc. (doing business as Populous) is an American architectural firm that specializes in the design of sports stadiums and training centres, entertainment arenas, conference and exhibitions centres and aviation and esports facilities, as well as the planning and design of major special events.

Founded and based in Kansas City, Missouri, the firm operates across multiple continents with significant presence in the Americas, Europe, the Middle East and North Africa, and Asia-Pacific regions, maintaining other regional headquarters in London and Brisbane, and offices in multiple other international locations.

Populous has designed more than 3500 projects across the globe, worth over $60 billion across emerging and established markets. Projects of note include Yankee Stadium in New York City; the Olympic and Tottenham Hotspur stadiums in London; the Nanjing Sports Park in Nanjing; the Sphere in Las Vegas; the International Convention Centre in Sydney and Highmark Stadium in Buffalo, as well as event planning for the Super Bowl and Major League Baseball All Star Game.

Populous was created through a management buyout in January 2009, becoming independently owned and operated. It is reported to be one of the largest architecture firms in the world, with over 1500 staff and 32 offices. Populous formerly operated as HOK Sport, which was part of HOK Group Inc.

== History ==
=== Company development ===
In 1983, HOK under Jerry Sincoff created a sports group (initially called the Sports Facilities Group and later changed to HOK Sport Venue Event). The firm initially consisted of eight architects in Kansas City, and grew to employ 185 people by 1996. The HOK Sport studio was led by architect Ron Labinski, who has been described as "the world's first sports venue architect."

On several projects, HOK Sport had teamed with international design practice LOBB Partnership, which maintained offices in London, England, and Brisbane, Australia. On HOK Sport's 15th anniversary in November 1998, the firm merged with LOBB. The new practice retained headquarters in all three cities.

The Kansas City, Missouri, office was first based in the city's Garment District in the Lucas Place office building. In 2005, it moved into its headquarters at 300 Wyandotte in the River Market neighborhood in a new building it designed, on land developed as an urban renewal project through tax incentives from the city's Planned Industrial Expansion Authority. It was the first major company to relocate to the neighborhood in several decades.

In March 2009, HOK Sport Venue Event changed its name to Populous after a management buyout from HOK Group.

Populous completed the design and oversaw the construction of the 2012 Olympic Stadium in London.

In October 2015, Populous relocated to its new Americas headquarters at the newly renovated Board of Trade building at 4800 Main street near the Country Club Plaza in Kansas City. In August 2024, the Kansas City Business Journal reported that Populous was moving its Americas headquarters back downtown into the new 1400KC building in the Power and Light District.

The company is one of several Kansas City-based sports design firms that trace their roots to Kivett and Myers which designed the Truman Sports Complex which was one of the first modern large single purpose sports stadiums (previously, stadiums were designed for multipurpose use). Other firms with sports design presence in Kansas City that trace their roots to Kivett include Ellerbe Becket Inc. and HNTB Corp. 360 Architecture is also based in Kansas City.

In 2019, the Populous-designed Tottenham Hotspur Stadium opened in London, featuring a retractable pitch to accommodate both football and NFL games.

In 2022, Populous was named Fast Company's Most Innovative Company in Architecture, largely due to its work on Climate Pledge Arena in Seattle.

The firm also worked with Foster + Partners; firstly on the redesign of Wembley Stadium in 2007, then (with Arup as the Stadium engineers), as the designated sports architect responsible for the design of the seating bowl and associated facilities at Lusail Stadium, the largest venue for the 2022 FIFA World Cup.

In September 2023, the Las Vegas Sphere designed by Populous opened with a residency by U2. It is the most expensive entertainment venue built in the Las Vegas Valley and the world's largest spherical structure.

In 2023 Populous announced a strategic minority investment from Providence Equity Partners.

In 2025, Populous acquired Fentress Architects, a global design firm specialising in aviation, civil and cultural projects.

Populous has a significant design presence in the Kingdom of Saudi Arabia and the Middle East. 11 of the 14 stadiums in the Saudi 2034 World Cup bid are either designed or redeveloped by the practice.

=== "Retro" era of baseball parks ===
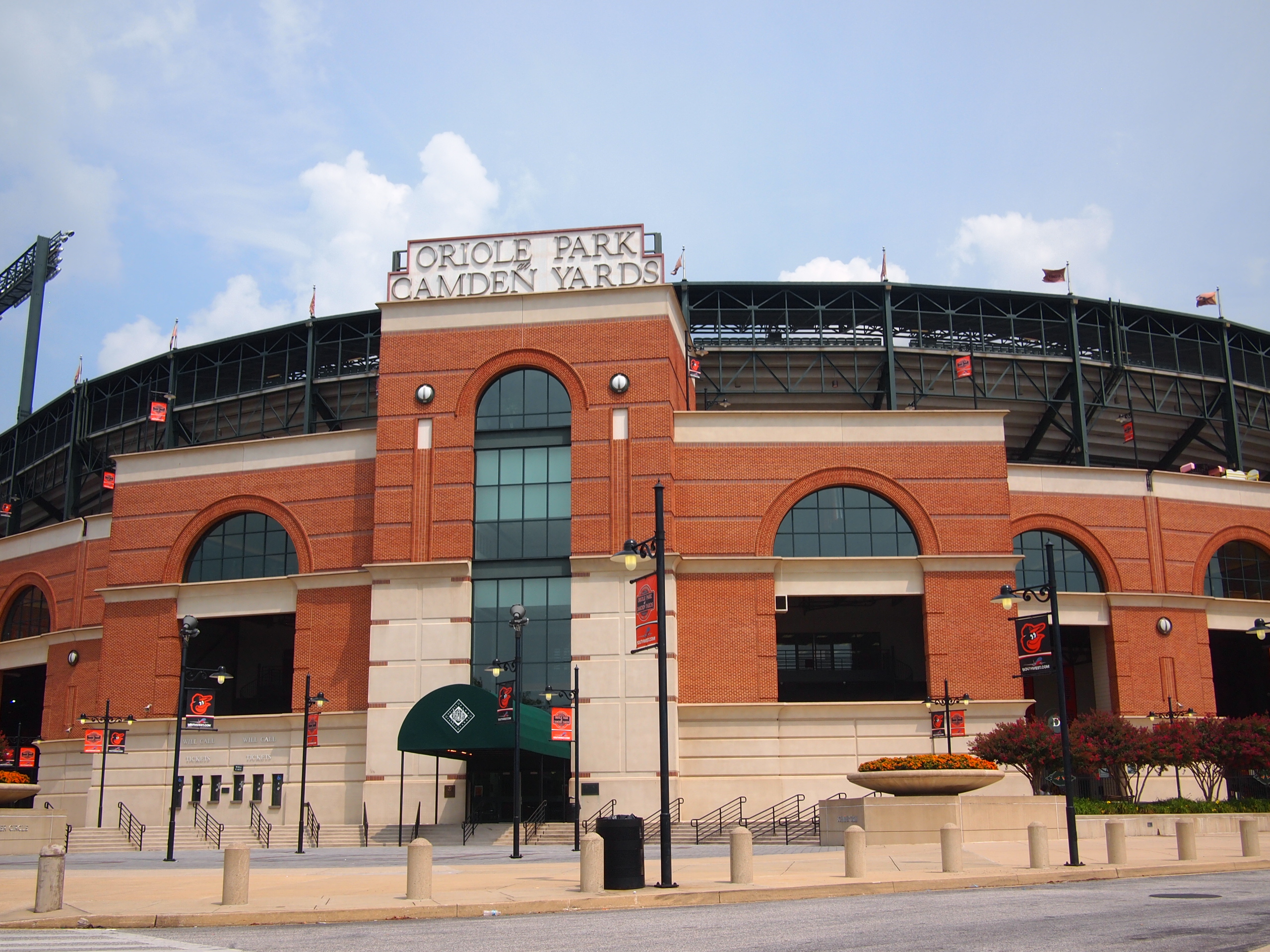
The red brick facade of Camden Yards was designed by Populous to blend into the surrounding neighborhood of downtown Baltimore, especially the nearby Baltimore & Ohio Warehouse at Camden Yards.

Populous is credited for spearheading a new era of baseball park design in the 1990s, beginning with Oriole Park at Camden Yards in Baltimore. At Camden Yards, and in other stadiums built by Populous soon thereafter, such as Coors Field in Denver and Progressive Field in Cleveland, the ballpark was designed to incorporate aesthetic elements of the city's history and older "classic ballparks." Camden Yards's red brick facade emulates the massive Baltimore & Ohio Warehouse at Camden Yards that dominates the right field view behind Eutaw Street, whereas Progressive Field's glass and steel exterior "call[s] to mind the drawbridges and train trestles that crisscross the nearby Cuyahoga River." Starting with Great American Ball Park in Cincinnati in 2003, a number of Populous Sport's stadiums featured more contemporary and even futuristic designs. Subsequent stadium exteriors featuring this motif opened in Washington, D.C., and Minnesota.

In addition to moving away from the concrete exteriors of the "cookie-cutter" multi-purpose stadiums that preceded the new parks, Populous incorporated other innovative touches: natural grass playing surfaces (instead of artificial turf), asymmetrical field dimensions, various park-specific idiosyncrasies (like Tal's Hill in Houston), and less foul territory that would keep fans farther from the diamond. And because the stadiums were designed for baseball instead of several sports, the sightlines were "uniformly excellent."

Camden Yards was hugely popular with baseball fans, and its success convinced many cities to invest public funds in their own new ballparks to help revitalize struggling urban neighborhoods. From 1992 to 2012, HOK Sport/Populous were the lead architects on 14 Major League Baseball stadiums and helped renovate four existing stadiums.

== Criticism ==
Populous's designs across Major League Baseball have become so prevalent that some critics have asserted that the distinctiveness that was originally found in early retro-classic ballparks is impossible to maintain. Some older ballparks like Fenway Park have strange dimensions because of the small parcels of land on which the parks were built. Most new stadiums are built on larger, dedicated land parcels. One sportswriter said the attempt to emulate the old parks' quirks is "contrived."

Some commentators have criticized a tendency to cater new ballparks toward wealthier ticket buyers, such as with expanded numbers of luxury suites. Several writers have noted that upper deck seating at new ballparks may actually be farther away from the field than in the older parks, partly as a result of these new upper decks being pushed higher by rows of luxury suites. One writer in The New Yorker said it is "not quite right to credit or blame Populous" for trends in their new stadiums—as it is ultimately team owners that plan what they want in future stadiums—but that the firm "certainly enabled" such changes.

== Venues ==
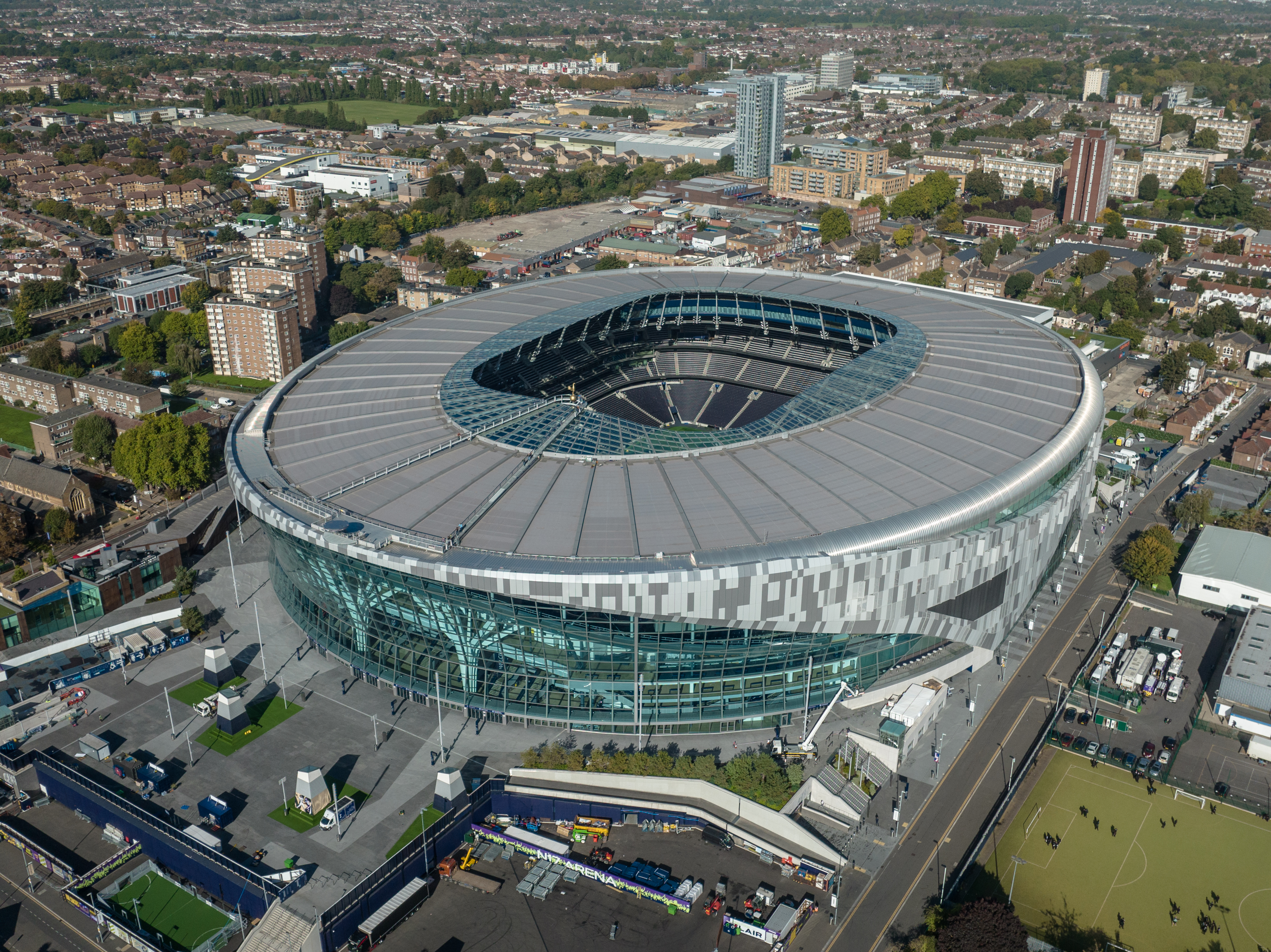
Tottenham Hotspur Stadium

=== Stadiums ===
- Oriole Park at Camden Yards – Baltimore, United States (1992)
- Estádio da Luz – Lisbon, Portugal (2003)
- Estádio Algarve – Faro, Portugal (2003)
- Emirates Stadium – London, England (2006)
- Wembley Stadium – London, England (2007)
- Citi Field – New York City, United States (2009)
- Yankee Stadium – New York City, United States (2009)
- London Stadium – London, England (2011)
- Arena das Dunas – Natal, Brazil (2014)
- Stadium MK – Milton Keynes, England (2015)
- Groupama Stadium and Training Centre – Lyon, France (2016)
- Mercedes-Benz Stadium – Atlanta, United States (2017)
- Tottenham Hotspur Stadium – London, England (2019)
- Narendra Modi Stadium – Ahmedabad, India (2020)
- Nassau County International Cricket Stadium – New York, United States (2024)
- Kai Tak Sports Park - Hong Kong (2025)
- Prince Moulay Abdellah Stadium – Rabat, Morocco (2025)
- Te Kaha Stadium – Christchurch, New Zealand (2026)
- Highmark Stadium – Orchard Park, New York, United States (2026)
- NS Square – Singapore (2027)
- Proposed Tampa Bay Rays stadium – Tampa, Florida, United States (2029)
- Shah Alam Sports Complex – Shah Alam, Selangor, Malaysia (2030)
- Rach Chiec National Sports Complex – Ho Chi Minh City, Vietnam (2031)

=== Indoor Arenas ===
- Philippine Arena – Ciudad de Victoria, Philippines (2014)
- Addition Financial Arena – Orlando, Florida, U.S. (2007)
- UBS Arena – Elmont, New York, U.S. (2021)
- LDLC Arena - Lyon, France (2023)

=== Convention and civic centres ===
- University of Houston Athletics and Alumni Center – Houston, Texas, U.S. (1995)
- Grand River Event Center – Dubuque, Iowa, U.S. (2003)
- Iowa Events Center – Des Moines, Iowa, U.S. (2005)
- Peoria Civic Center - Peoria, Illinois, U.S. (2008)
- Phoenix Convention Center – Phoenix, Arizona, U.S. (2008)
- Utah Valley Convention Center - Provo, Utah, U.S. (2010)
- Qatar National Convention Centre, Doha, Qatar (2011)
- San Jose McEnery Convention Center expansion, San Jose, U.S. (2014)
- ICC Sydney, Sydney, Australia (2016)
- Henry B. Gonzales Convention Center, San Antonio, U.S. (2017)
- World Trade Center Bhubaneswar – Bhubaneswar, Odisha, India (2017)
- Anaheim Convention Center – Anaheim, California, U.S. (2017)

=== Music and entertainment venues ===
- MSG Sphere Las Vegas – Las Vegas, Nevada, U.S. (2023)
- Co-op Live – Manchester, England (2024)

=== Race track ===
- Mount Panorama - Bathurst, New South Wales, Australia (1938)
- Silverstone Circuit - Silverstone, England (2011)
- Mandalika International Street Circuit – Central Lombok Regency, Indonesia (2021)
