= Norfolk World Trade Center =

Coordinates: 36.8462°N 76.2934°W

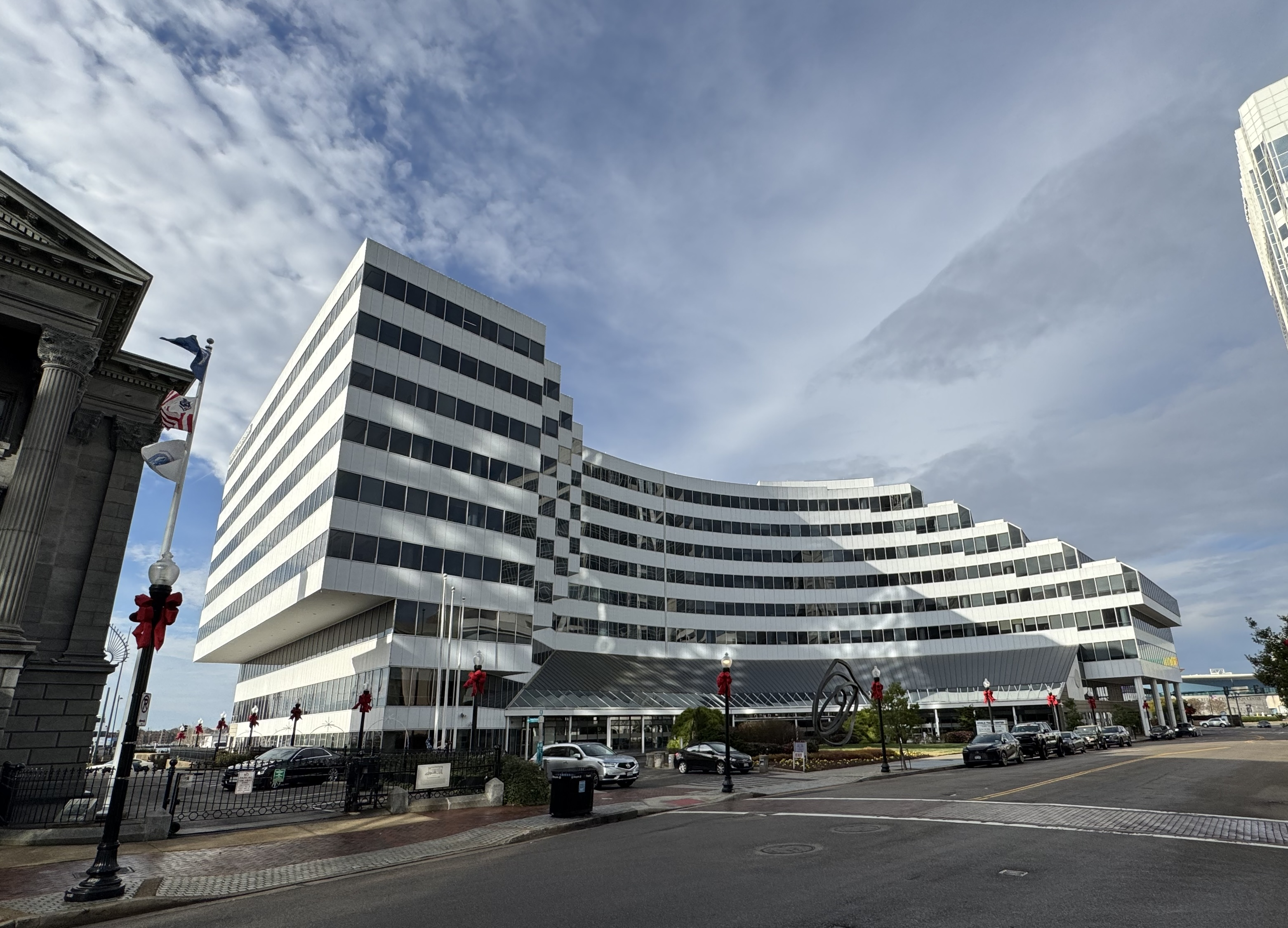
- Interactive map of the Norfolk World Trade Center area

General information
- Type: Office building
- Location: 101 West Main St., Norfolk, VA
- Completed: 1983
- Renovated: 2008
- Owner: WTC Holdings LLC

Technical details
- Floor count: 9

Design and construction
- Architect: Bruce Graham

The Norfolk World Trade Center is an office building in Norfolk, Virginia, affiliated with the World Trade Centers Association.

== Location ==
The building is located near the waterfront of downtown Norfolk. It is located next to the old Norfolk City Hall, and nearby Nauticus and the USS Wisconsin. The downtown Norfolk station for The Tide light rail is also nearby.

Outside the building is a small garden, its centerpiece being Bernar Venet's sculpture Undetermined Line.

== History ==
Construction on the building began in the early 1980s, being completed in 1983. The building cost $30 million to build. It was designed by the Peruvian-American architect Bruce Graham.

In 2008, the building underwent a $2.5-million renovation, due to leakage from the exterior walls and atrium. The task was undertaken by Simpson Gumpertz & Heger (SGH).

In December 2021, the building was sold to WTC Holdings LLC for $69 million.

== Tenants ==
The building holds 30 international steamship companies, as well as four Fortune 500 companies.

== Facilities ==
The building features three conference rooms, each accommodating groups of 8, 15, and 55 people, respectively. Town Point Club is located on the 3rd floor. The building features a full-service commercial bank on the ground floor, alongside a café and executive fitness center.
