= World Trade Centre Kolkata =

Trade centre of West Bengal

World Trade Center Kolkata বিশ্ব বাণিজ্য কেন্দ্র, কলকাতা
- Location in Kolkata Location in West Bengal Location in India
- Address: Kolkata (Greater)
- Location: Salt Lake Sector V
- Coordinates: 22°34′41.07″N 88°26′11.91″E
- Type: Commercial
- Surface: Phase 1 350,000 square feet (33,000 m^{2}); Total Planned 3,500,000 square feet (330,000 m^{2})
- Acreage: 10.5 acres

Construction
- Cost: ₹1,500.00 crore (US$160 million) (Expected)
- Builder: Merlin Group

The World Trade Centre Kolkata is an under-construction commercial building in the Biddhannagar, Kolkata in the Indian state of West Bengal. It will consist of multiple towers. The location is close to Netaji Subhas Chandra Bose International Airport.

== History ==
=== 1990 proposal ===
The first WTC was proposed in 1990 in a 223- Acre plot in East Kolkata with corporate offices, residential space, shopping centers and golf courses. But the project did not succeed since it would cover up the East Kolkata wetlands which were protected by court order.

=== 2013 proposal ===
The Chief Minister of West Bengal in 2013 had shown keen interest in establishing a World Trade Centre (WTC) in Kolkata. For this, Pawan Dhoot, Managing Director, Dhoot Group, invited Eric Dahl, CEO of World Trade Center's Association (WTCA), the largest international trade association and the government ministers and officials in Kolkata. The ground work related to the project never really started under the Dhoot led consortium.

=== 2023 proposal ===
Merlin Group later in 2023 announced their partnership with the World Trade Centers Association to develop the World Trade Center in Kolkata which would cover an area of 3.5 million square feet. The project’s License Agreement was signed by Scott Wang, Vice President of the World Trade Centers Association (WTCA) Asia Pacific region, and Merlin Group’s Chairman, Sushil Mohta, and Managing Director, Saket Mohta. Approximately ₹1,500 crore investment proposal was initialized by the company for the implementation of the project. Chief Minister of West Bengal Mamata Banerjee, during the industry enclave meet in Mumbai, was approached by the promoters of World Trade Centre Mumbai with a proposal to erect a similar structure in Kolkata.

== Location ==
Merlin Group initialized the development of World Trade Centre project in a 10.5 Acre plot in the Nabadiganta Industrial Township Authority (NDITA) area, Salt Lake Sector V, Kolkata.

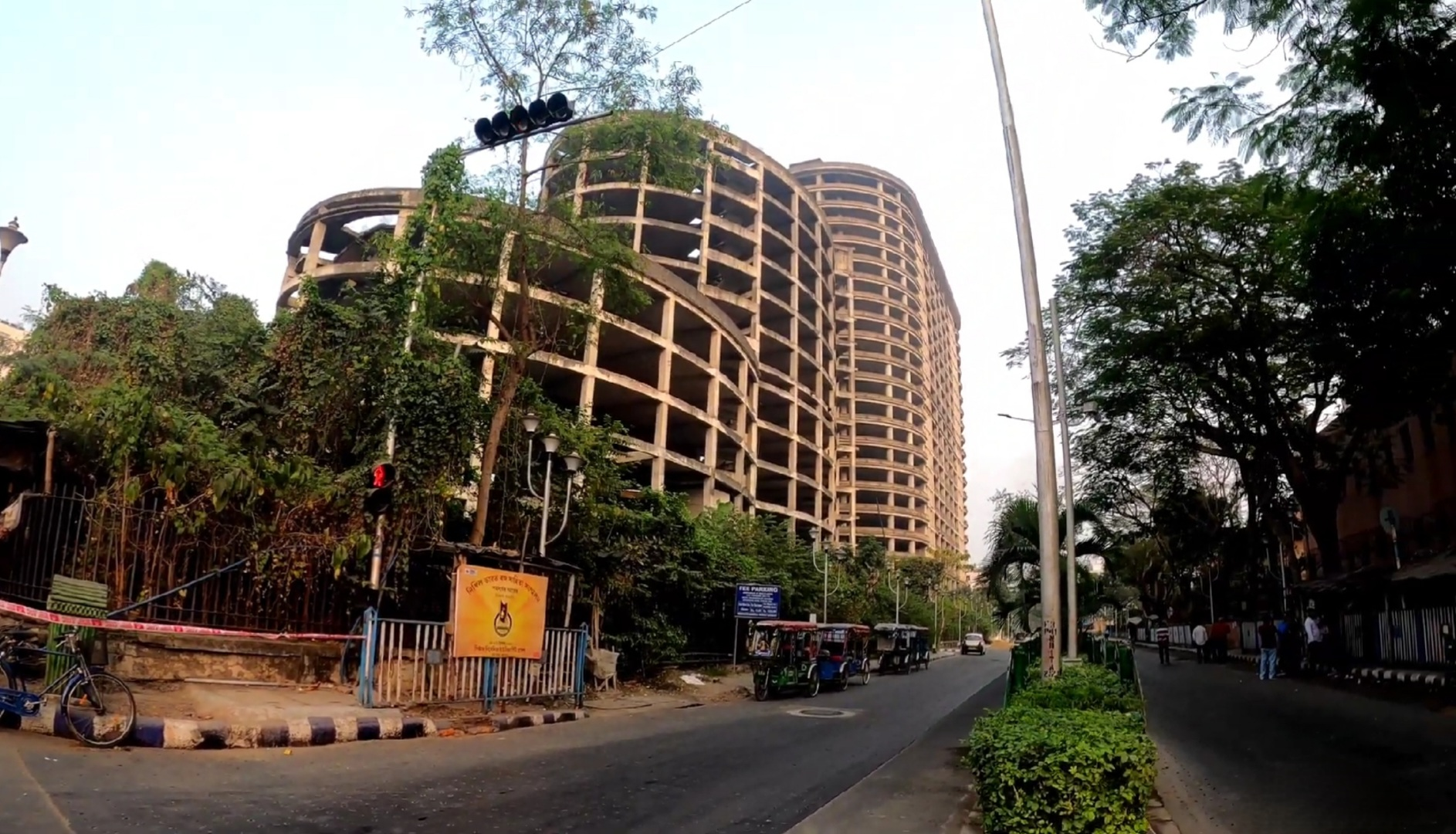
Videocon Group's abandoned project in Salt Lake Sector V to be developed as World Trade Center

The company accessed the prime land which once belonged to Kitchen Appliances India Ltd, a Videocon group entity, through insolvency resolution. Aryan Mining was the successful resolution applicant for KAIL. The owners of Aryan Mining, are related to the Mohta family of the Merlin Group by marriage. Hence, both the firms decided to join hands for completion of the project.

== Completion ==
Phase I of the entire project is planned to be completed by 2nd half of 2025.

== See also ==
- List of world trade centers
- List of tallest buildings in Kolkata
- List of tallest buildings in India
