= Renaissance Plaza =

Coordinates: 39.95687°N 75.13886°W

- former One Trade Square rendering
- Interactive map of Renaissance Plaza

General information
- Status: Proposed
- Type: Office, Residential
- Location: Philadelphia, Pennsylvania, U.S.
- Height: 240 feet (73 m)

Design and construction
- Architects: Alesker & Dundon Architects
- Developer: Carl Marks Real Estate Group, Waterfront Renaissance Associates

Renaissance Plaza (formerly named World Trade Square) is a proposed residential and retail complex to be built on a 5.5-acre (2.2 ha) site in the Delaware Riverfront region of Philadelphia, Pennsylvania. The design calls for four high-rise office buildings: Old City Harbor Tower I, Old City Harbor Tower II, Old City Harbor Tower III, and the Greater Philadelphia World Trade Center.

== History ==
Plans were initially created for a Philadelphia World Trade Center in 1988. The project would have included a 65-story skyscraper as well as three other buildings. However, this proposal ultimately fell through.

The developer, Carl Marks Real Estate Group, contracted Alesker & Dundon Architects to redesign the project as four shorter skyscrapers to be completed in 2010, but the plan was downsized again in 2012.

The 2012 plan by Waterfront Renaissance Associates called for a 1,458-unit residential tower complex, with two taller 426 ft towers and two shorter 227 ft towers. The development would have violated the 100 foot height limit imposed by the Delaware River Waterfront Corporation in their master plan.

In response to height concerns, the plan was revised again in July 2013 to lower the height of the tallest tower to 240 feet and build five towers instead of four.

In 2024, the Casino Reinvestment Development Authority approved a $200,000 resolution to "fund costs associated with investigating current conditions at the Plaza [for revitalization] and preparation of a preliminary design and budget."

The latest design calls for four towers: Old City Harbor Tower I, Old City Harbor Tower II, Old City Harbor Tower III, and the Greater Philadelphia World Trade Center.

== See also ==
- List of tallest buildings in Philadelphia
