= World Trade Center (Copenhagen) =

Coordinates: 55°37′33″N 12°34′32″E

World Trade Center Copenhagen is a proposed complex in Ørestad, a development zone between Copenhagen's city center and Copenhagen Airport in Denmark. Designed by Kim Utzon, son of architect Jørn Utzon, who designed the Sydney Opera House. The centre is planned to comprise three high-rise office blocks of 20 stories each, with the rest of the building between 7 and 9 floors in height.

The 125,000 square metres (1,350,000 sq ft) of floorspace will host a wide range of facilities including restaurants, cafés, shops, a hotel, an exhibition centre and conference facilities.
