= World Trade Center (Macau) =

Building in Macau, China

Coordinates: 22.191731°N 113.552172°E

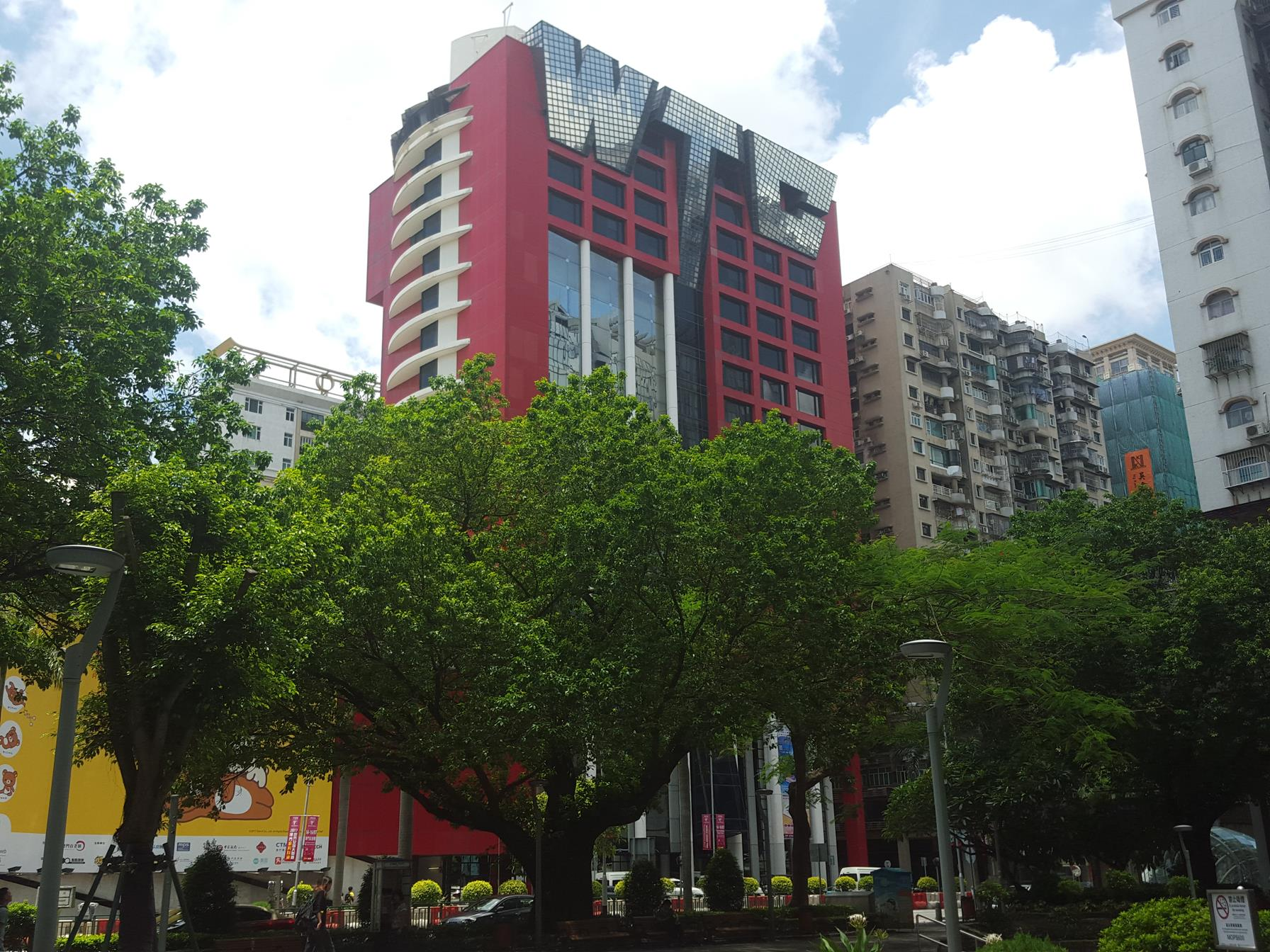
World Trade Center Macau

The World Trade Center Macau (Chinese: 澳門世界貿易中心) is a trade and convention facility in Macau, China. The 19-story tower and complex was built by Portuguese architect Manuel Vicente and completed in 1996, three years before the handover from the Portuguese back to China.

== See also ==
- Lisboa Hotel
- China Travel Service Building, Macau
