= World Trade Center Almeda Park =

Coordinates: 41.350°N 2.085°E

- Interactive map of the World Trade Center Almeda Park area

General information
- Status: part of complete, part of under construction
- Location: Cornellà de Llobregat, Catalonia, Spain

Height
- Height: 94 m (308 ft) - Hotel WTC Almeda Park

Technical details
- Floor count: 28 - Hotel WTC Almeda Park

World Trade Center Almeda Park is an international trade, service and information centre in Cornellà de Llobregat (suburb of Barcelona), Catalonia, Spain. WTC Almeda Park has been in operation since June 2004. Currently consists of several buildings, it is planned to build a skyscraper (Hotel WTC Almeda Park) with 28 floors and rise 94 meters (308 ft).

== See also ==
- List of tallest buildings and structures in Barcelona
