= Wenzhou World Trade Center =

Supertall skyscraper in Wenzhou, Zhejiang, China

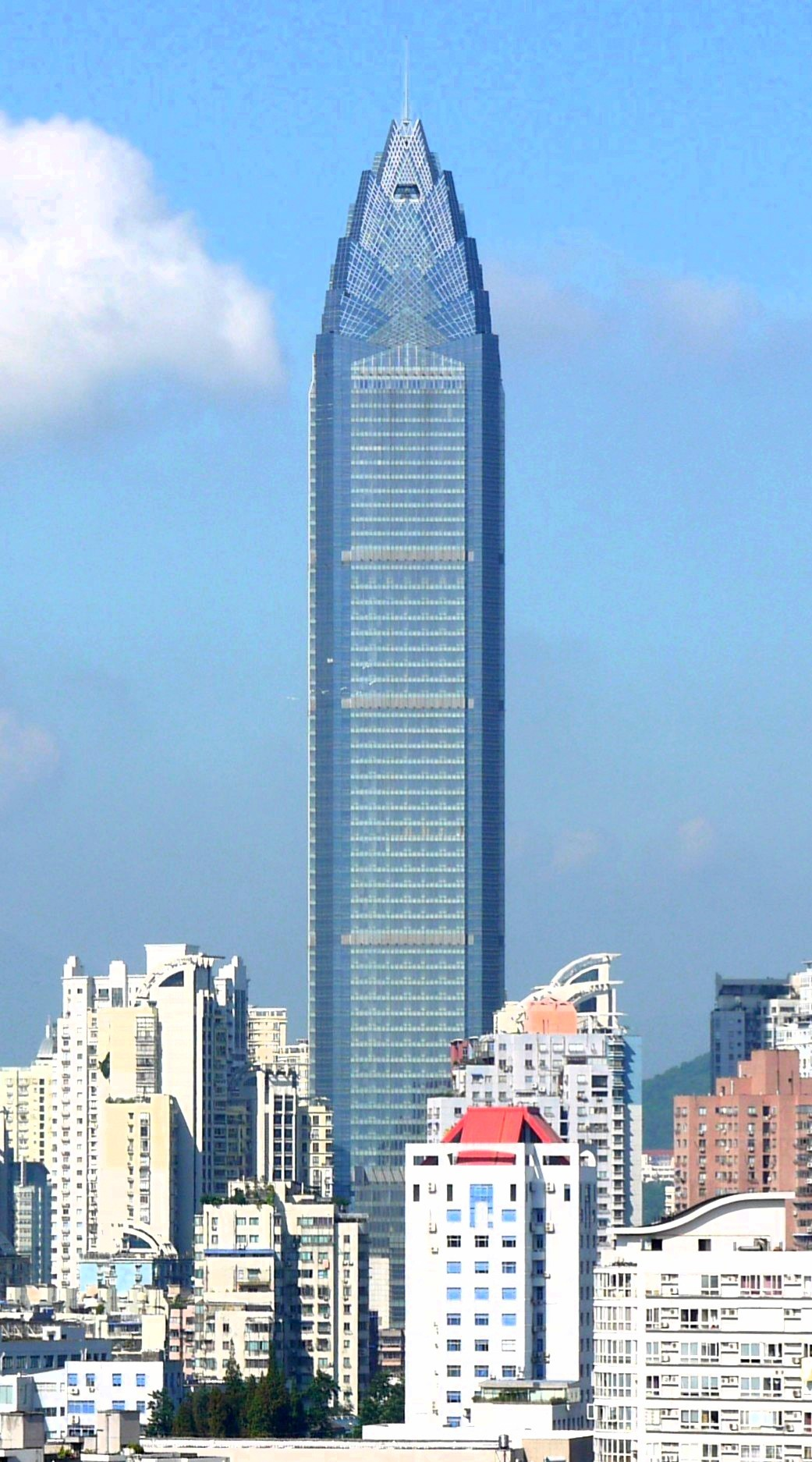
- Interactive map of the Wenzhou World Trade Center area

General information
- Status: Completed
- Type: Mixed-use
- Location: Wenzhou, Zhejiang, China
- Coordinates: 28°00′25″N 120°39′54″E
- Construction started: June 9, 2003
- Completed: April 18, 2010
- Opening: October 20, 2010

Height
- Architectural: 321.9 m (1,056 ft)

Technical details
- Floor count: 68
- Floor area: 174,361 m^{2} (1,876,806 sq ft)

Design and construction
- Architect: Shanghai Institute of Architectural Design & Research
- Developer: Wenzhou International Trade Real Estate Development Co., Ltd.

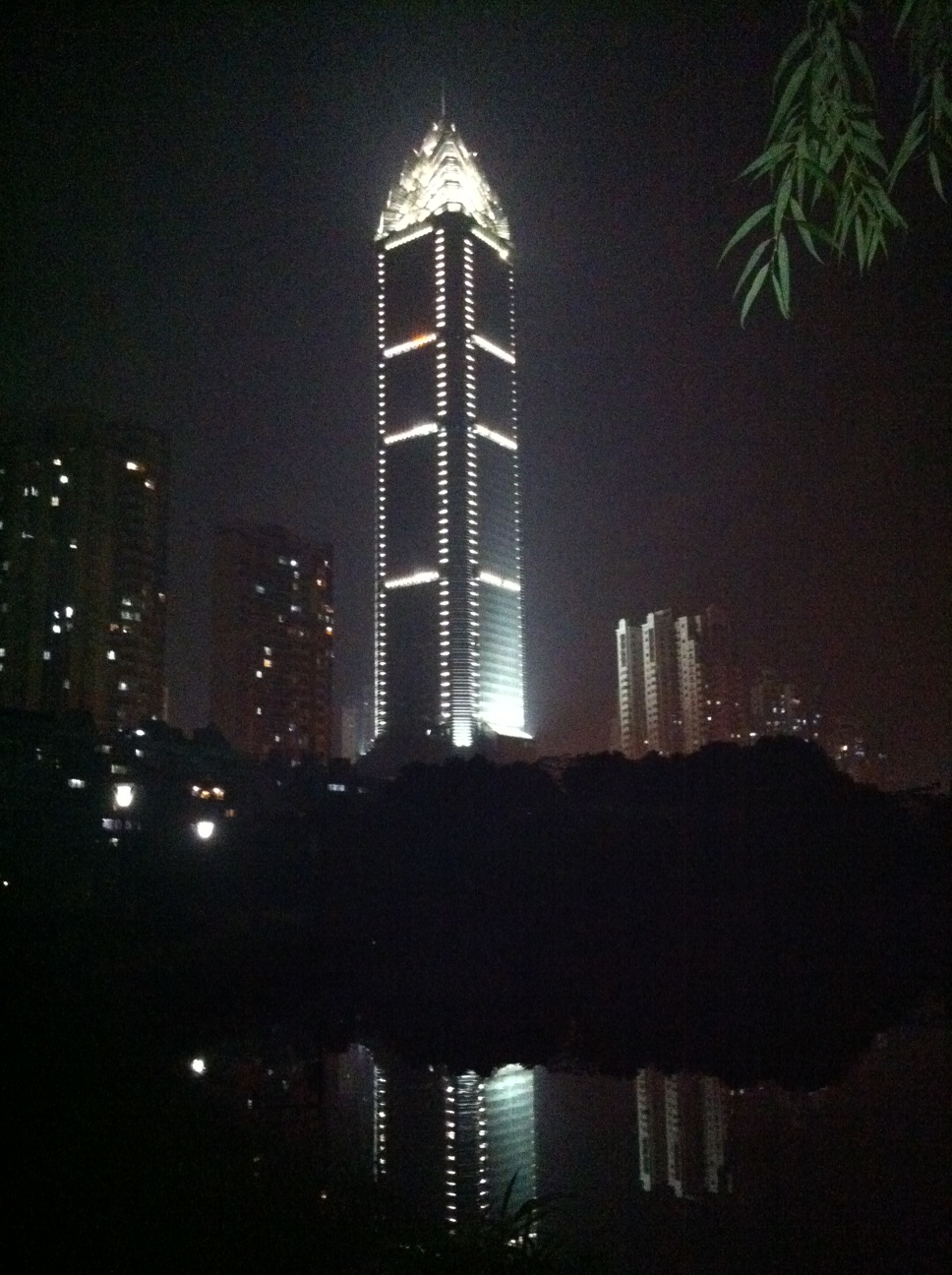
Wenzhou World Trade Center at night

Wenzhou World Trade Center (Chinese: 温州世贸中心大厦) is a 68-floor supertall skyscraper in Wenzhou, Zhejiang, China. Construction of the building began on 9 June 2003 and was completed in 2010 at 333 m (1,093 ft), giving it the title of the 107th-tallest building in the world. It is located in the downtown area of Wenzhou where it stands as the tallest building in the city. It's the tallest in Zhejiang province and the 56th-tallest in China.

The Wenzhou World Trade Center is to be used as office space and a luxury hotel.

Original plans called for the Wenzhou World Trade Center to be only 260 m (853 ft) tall.
