= World Trade Centre Toronto =

Canadian building complex

Residences of the World Trade Centre
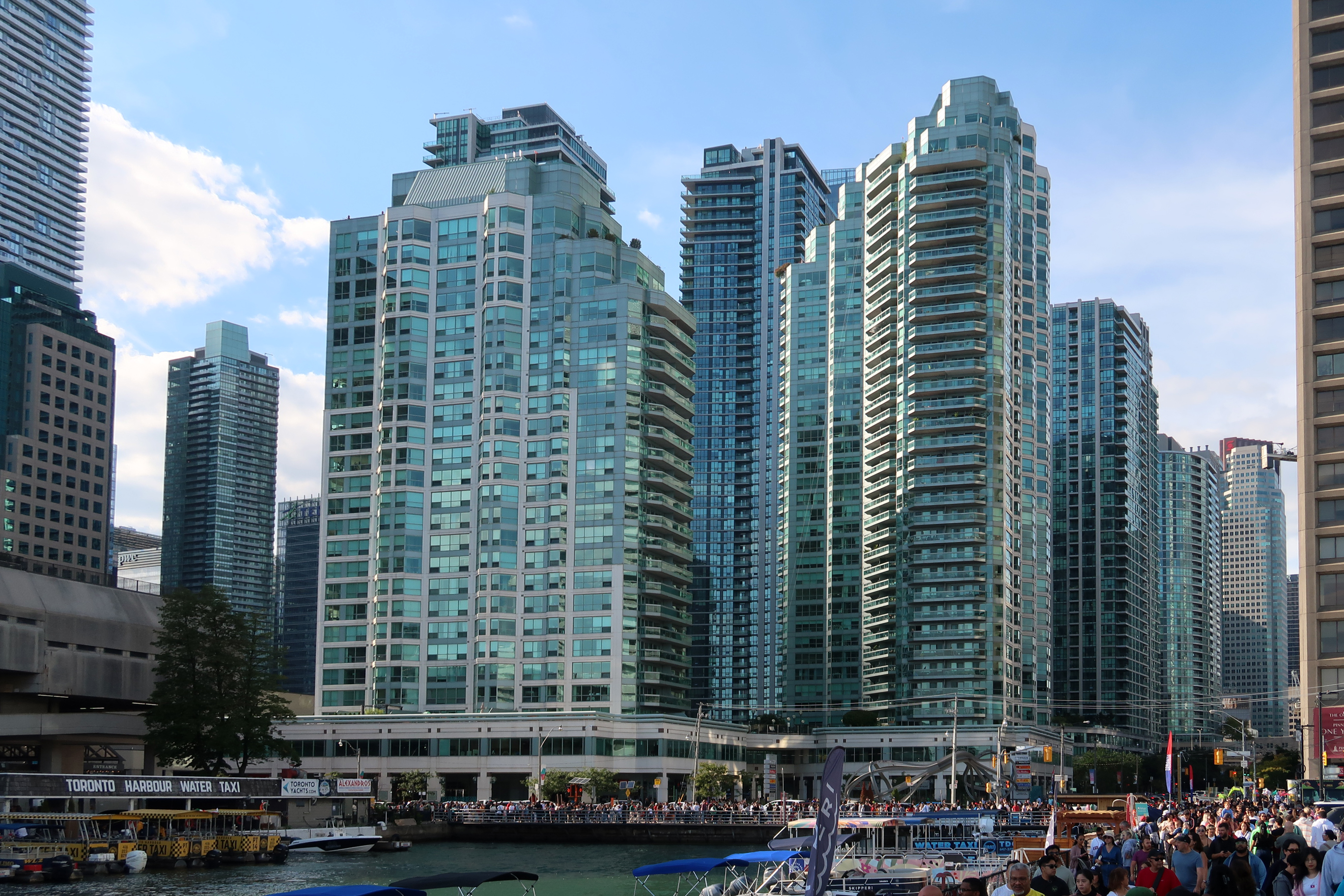
- Interactive map of the Residences of the World Trade Centre area

General information
- Status: Completed
- Type: Residential Condominium, Retail
- Architectural style: Postmodern
- Location: Toronto, Ontario, Canada, 10 Yonge St, 10 Queens Quay W
- Coordinates: 43.6422°N 79.3757°W
- Construction started: 1988
- Completed: 1990

Height
- Height: 10 Yonge: 113 metres / 371 ft, 10 Queens Quay W: 81 metres / 266 ft

Technical details
- Floor count: 10 Yonge: 38 floors, 10 Queens Quay W: 27 floors

Design and construction
- Architect: Zeidler Partnership Architects
- Developer: Camrost Felcorp

Other information
- Number of units: 10 Yonge: 407 units, 10 Queens Quay W: 292 units

The Residences of the World Trade Centre is a postmodern complex near the Harbourfront in Toronto, Ontario, Canada. Built in 1990, the taller of two buildings rises to 38 floors in height. The Residences of the World Trade Centre is a 700-unit condominium complex, with retail at ground level.

== History ==
Construction for the complex began in 1988, by the developer Camrost Felcorp. Construction finished in 1990. The building was designed by Zeidler Partnership Architects. The development originally would have consisted of two condominium towers, and three office towers, which the office towers would have been located north of the current condominium complex. However, due to the sharp market correction in the early 1990s, the project was shelved, and the only part of the project to be completed were the two condominium towers. The site of which the 3 office towers would have been built is now occupied by Pinnacle Centre, which contains 4 condominium towers, completed in the 2000s and early 2010s by the developer Pinnacle International.

The construction company involved was EllisDon Corporation, with the electrical contractor being Jay Electric Ltd., mechanical engineer being John Garay Engineering Ltd., and the structural engineer being Quinn Dressel Associates.

== Description ==
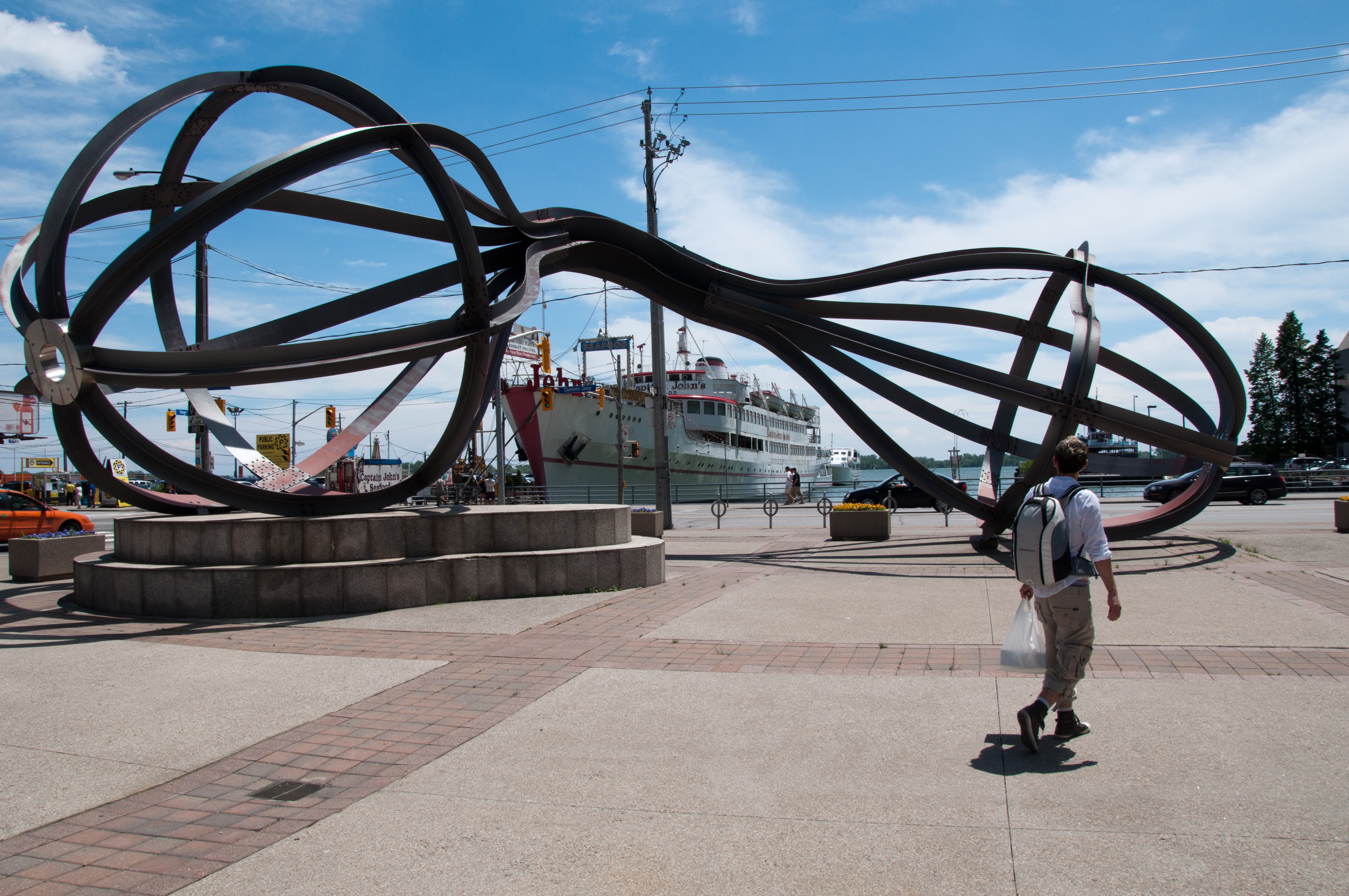
Sculpture found in front of The Residences of the World Trade Centre

The complex contains two condominium towers. One located at 10 Yonge Street, named Residences of the World Trade Centre North East Tower, rises to 38 floors, and approximately 113 m / 371 ft. The other tower, located at 10 Queens Quay West, named Residences of the World Trade Centre South West Tower, rises to 27 floors, and approximately 81 m / 266 ft. The complex also contains retail at ground level.

The complex contains approximately 700 condominium units in total. With 10 Yonge containing 407 units, and 10 Queens Quay W containing 292 units.
