= World Trade Centers Association =

International trade organization

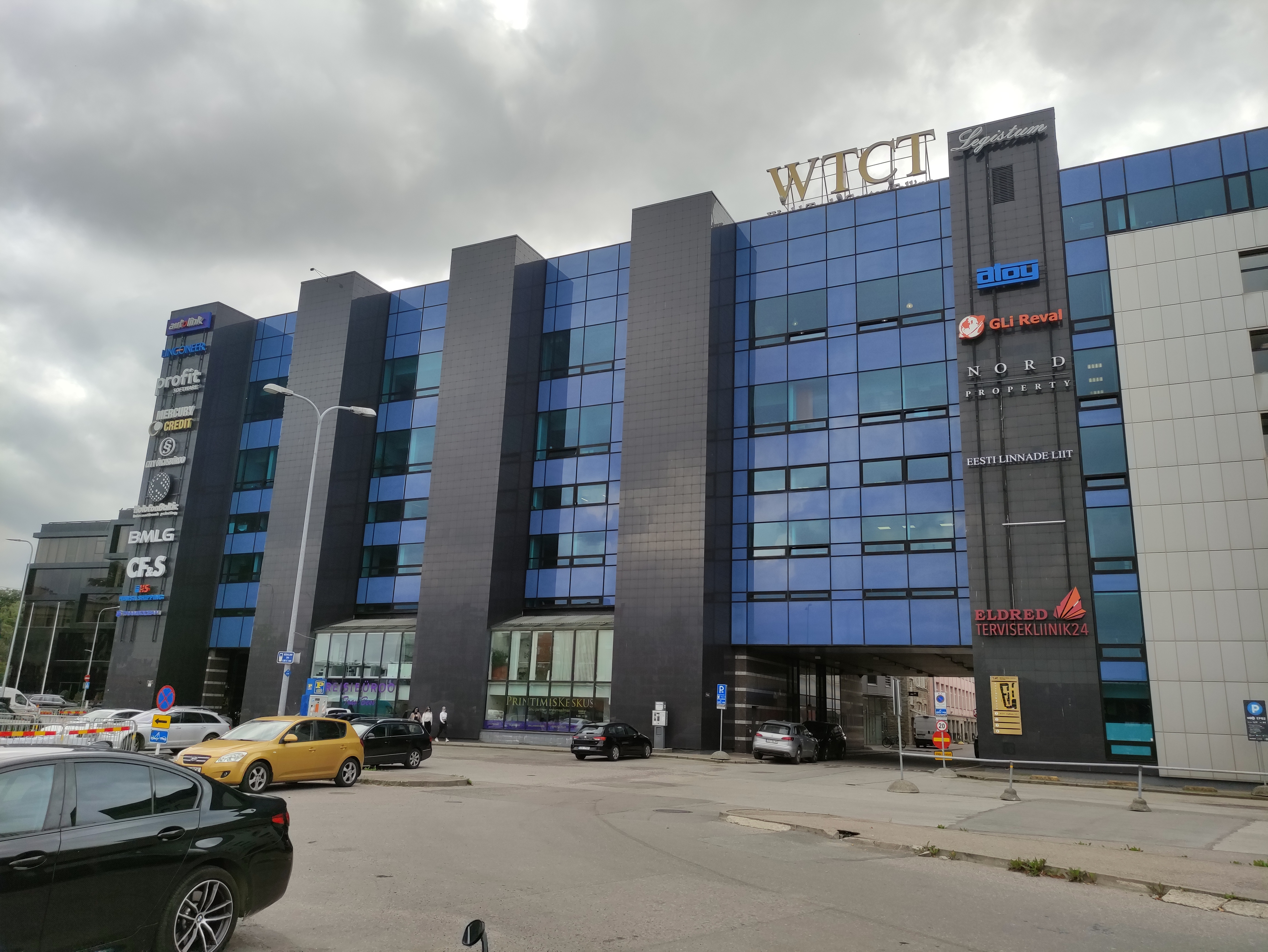
- World Trade Center in Tallinn, Estonia
- Abbreviation: WTCA
- Formation: 1970; 56 years ago
- Founder: Guy F. Tozzoli
- Type: Not-for-profit, non-political trade association
- Purpose: Expansion of international trade through the establishment and operation of World Trade Centers
- Headquarters: New York City, U.S.
- Members: 323 licensed properties in 90 countries (2020)
- Governance: 24-member international board of directors
- Website: wtca.org

The World Trade Centers Association (WTCA) was founded in 1970 by Port Authority NYNJ executive Guy F. Tozzoli. WTCA is a not-for-profit, non-political association dedicated to the establishment and operation of World Trade Centers (WTCs) as instruments for international trade expansion.

As of May 2020, the WTCA included 323 properties licensed in 90 countries and staffed by "15,000 WTC professionals". The WTCA is an unofficial umbrella trade association that unites corporations and government agencies in international trade.

== Licensing fees ==
In 2013, it was disclosed that the Association benefited substantially from its use of the "World Trade Center" name after the Port Authority of New York and New Jersey transferred to the Association in 1986 its local rights to the name for a token fee of $10. By licensing the use of the name to its members, including World Trade Center-branded merchandise, the Association generated considerable revenues while absorbing the heavy costs of registering the name and defending it against improper use in many countries.

The terms of the licensing arrangement were not widely publicized until 2013 when it became known that the Port Authority had supported the mission of the Association by providing rent-free office space and other help, with Association staff serving as the trade assistance arm of the World Trade Center. In December 2018, Laura Taylor Swain, Chief United States district judge of the United States District Court for the Southern District of New York, held that the wording of the 1986 assignment to the World Trade Centers Association did not include trademark rights for WORLD TRADE CENTER, such as for souvenir items bearing that mark. The WTCA received only ownership of the mark for services, such as for licensing to entities around the world.

== Principles and governance ==
The WTCA's founding principles are:

- To encourage the expansion of world trade;
- To promote international business relationships and understanding among nations;
- To foster increased participation in world trade by industrializing nations;
- To create and encourage mutual assistance and cooperation among members; and
- To promote and further the concept of the World Trade Center.

The WTCA is governed by a 24-member international Board of Directors, composed of executives from WTCA members around the world, and elected by the membership. Eight permanent committees have been established to carry on the work of the Association in the following fields:

- Committee on Facilities and Functions
- Committee on International Relations and Development
- Committee on Planning and Finance
- Committee on Public Relations and Information
- Committee on Tourism, Hospitality and Cultural Exchange
- Committee on Trade Education, Training and Research
- Committee on Trade Fairs, Trade Marts and High Tech Parks
- Committee on WTC Standards and Quality
- Committee on Peace & Stability through trade

In December 2008, the WTCA awarded its first Global Corporate Leadership award to Robert Thompson, the founder of CenTradeX of Nashville, Tennessee.
