= Harald Hellström =

Finnish lawyer and diplomat

Harald Magnus Hellström (2 March 1877 Pori – 4 May 1960 Helsinki) was a Finnish lawyer and diplomat.

Hellström's parents were Fredrik Wilhelm Hellstöm and Hanna Elvira Roth. He graduated from the Lönnbeckska School in Helsinki in 1897 and studied at the University of Helsinki, completing a degree in law of 1900 and a general administrative degree in 1907. Hellström received the Master of Law in 1903. He later graduated as a Bachelor of Law in 1927 and a Licentiate of Law in 1948.

Hellström served as an official in the Finnish Senate from 1905 to 1911 and was then assistant director of the branch office of Pohjoismaiden Osakepankki in Turku in 1911-1913, member of the Board of Directors of the Helsinki Union Bank in 1913-1914 and acting lawyer from 1914 to 1919. In the Ministry for Foreign Affairs Hellström was between 1919 and 1944, for example, as Head of the Legal Department of the Ministry and as Chargé d'Affaires at The Hague in 1932. Lastly, he served as Consul General in Oslo from 1940 to 1944. Hellström represented Finland at several international conferences and was a member of several committees. He received the Special Envoy and the Plenipotentiary's Title in 1938.

Hellström was also a member of the Board of Directors of Sigrid Juselius Foundation since 1930 and Chairman of the Foundation since 1946 and a member of the Board of Directors of Kymi Oy since 1952.

Hellström was married since 1922 with Hjördis Elisabeth Finnila.
