= Kansallis-Osake-Pankki =

Former bank in Finland

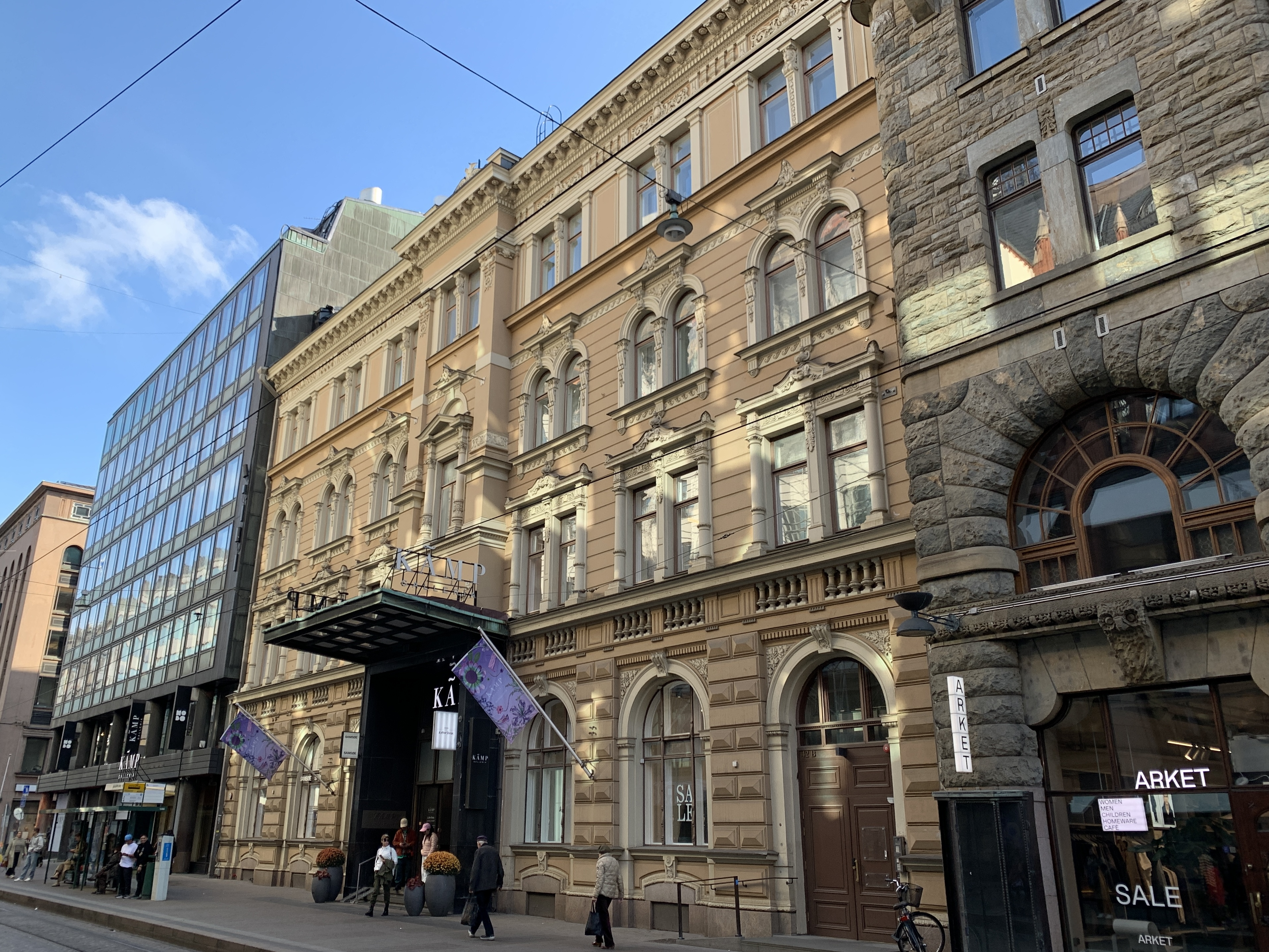
Former head office of Kansallis-Osake-Pankki, Aleksanterinkatu 42 in Kluuvi, Helsinki

Kansallis-Osake-Pankki (KOP, lit. 'National Joint-Stock Bank'), also known as Kansallispankki, was a commercial bank operating from 1889 to 1995 in Finland. It was created by the Fennoman movement as a Finnish alternative to the then-dominant bank largely associated with the Swedish-speaking community, Suomen Yhdyspankki (SYP, Swedish: Föreningsbanken i Finland). Its emblem was a blue stylized squirrel.

KOP absorbed several other banks during its century-long existence, including the Finnish Agricultural Joint-Stock Bank (Finnish: Suomen Maatalous-Osake-Pankki or SMOP, est. 1916 in Tampere, relocated to Helsinki in 1927), Pohjolan Osake-Pankki (lit. 'Joint-Stock Bank of Pohjola', est. 1916 in Oulu), Luotto-Pankki (lit. 'Credit Bank', est. 1917 in Helsinki), and Maakuntain Pankki (lit. 'Provincial Bank', est. 1928 in Helsinki). The latter had itself been formed from three troubled banks, namely Tampereen Osake-Pankki (lit. 'Joint-Stock Bank of Tampere', est. 1898 in Tampere), Länsi-Suomen Osake-Pankki (lit. 'Joint-Stock Bank of Western Finland', est. 1912 in Turku), and Maakuntain Keskus-Pankki (lit. 'Central Bank of the Provinces', est. 1918 in Helsinki).

KOP ended up merging with its long-term rival SYP in 1995 to form Merita Bank. Merita Bank in turn merged in 1997 with Sweden's Nordbanken to form MeritaNordbanken, renamed Nordea in 2000.

== Overview ==
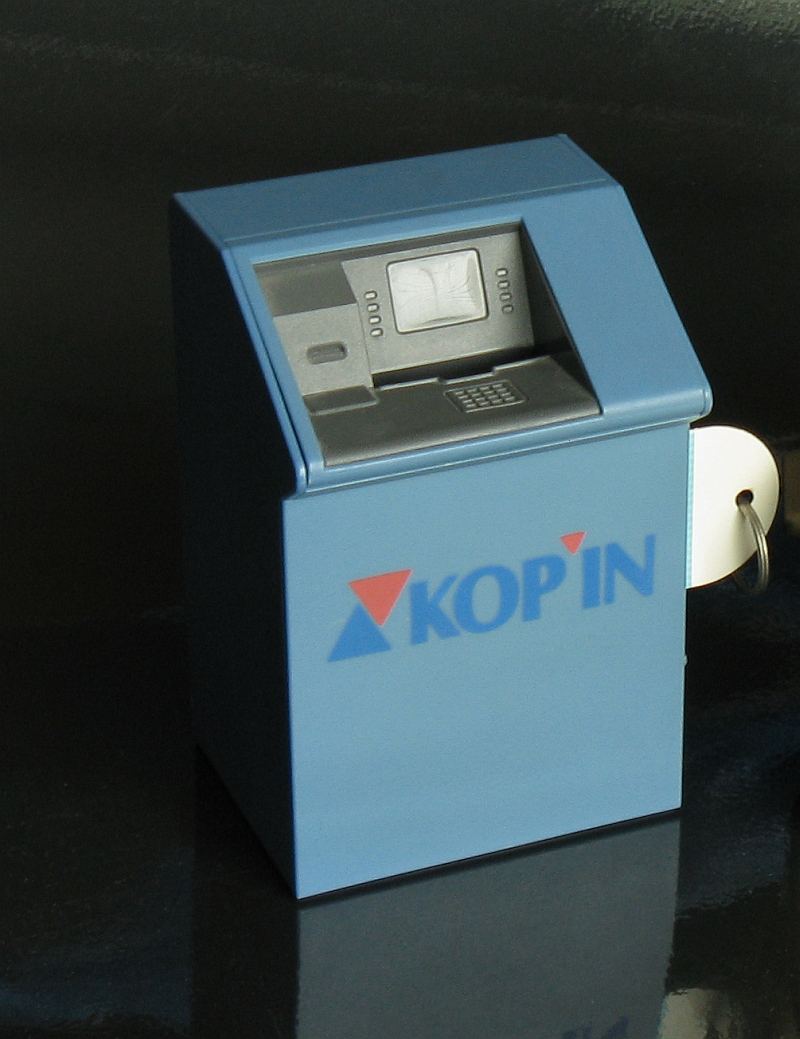
KOP deposit box

Bill portfolio Kansallis-Osake-Pankki Vipuri in Vyborg Museum

Kansallis-Osake-Pankki was established by the general meeting of its founding shareholders, held in the Mirror Hall of Hotel Kämp on 12 October 1889. The key founders were Otto Stenroth, Lauri Kivekäs, Matti Äyräpää, and the brothers Otto and August Hjelt. The background of Finland's language strife played an important role in the initiative, as banking in Finland was perceived to be dominated by the country's Swedish-speaking community. The bank opened to the public on 8 February 1890, even though individual deposits had already been taken and loans granted before that date. The bank's name was initially spelled Kansallis-Osakepankki, then changed in 1892 to Kansallis-Osake-Pankki.

Despite the original nationalist narrative, the bank's management did not push for a strict language stance, and was not strictly discriminatory in terms of management or leadership selection. In some localities, controversy arose when Swedish speakers were being hired for such positions. Overall, the rise of a Finnish-speaking and pro-Finnish business community benefited the bank in the early decades of its operations. KOP emerged as a socially and culturally significant institution in Finland with unmistakable political-ideological connections and social profile. In 1923, KOP acquired dominant influence in the troubled Luotto-Pankki, which it fully absorbed in 1933. In 1932, it also absorbed Maakuntain Pankki, the troubled bank formed in 1929 from Länsi-Suomen Osake-Pankki, and Maakuntain Keskus-Pankki and Tampereen Osake-Pankki.

During Finland's turbulent decade of the 1940s, KOP emerged as the most important commercial bank financier to support the indebted Finnish state. Significant changes also occurred in the bank's ownership structure as Pohjola Insurance, the leading insurance company of Finnish business, became KOP's second-largest shareholder. In the post-war period, KOP's main task was to secure the nation's independence and social system.

Matti Virkkunen was the CEO of KOP for a long period (1948–1975) marked by war reparations and devaluations of the Finnish markka, but also by resilience and strong economic growth. The branch network doubled, the number of customers also increased, and banking technology was modernized. KOP also gained market share by absorbing smaller commercial banks, including Pohjolan Osake-Pankki in 1949 and the Finnish Agricultural Joint-Stock Bank in 1958. Banking activities were strictly regulated during that period, even though the economy and foreign trade were otherwise liberalized. Virkkunen's strong personality influenced Finnish business life, as KOP was to support the activities of Finnish companies that deepened connections with Western countries while also continuing diplomatic trade with the Soviet Union.

KOP ran into financial distress during the 1990s Finnish banking crisis. In 1992, it absorbed the remaining parts of the troubled National Workers' Savings Bank. In 1994, it had to issue new shares under duress. In 1995, it finally merged with SYP, with KOP shareholders receiving 41.7 percent of equity capital in the merged entity.

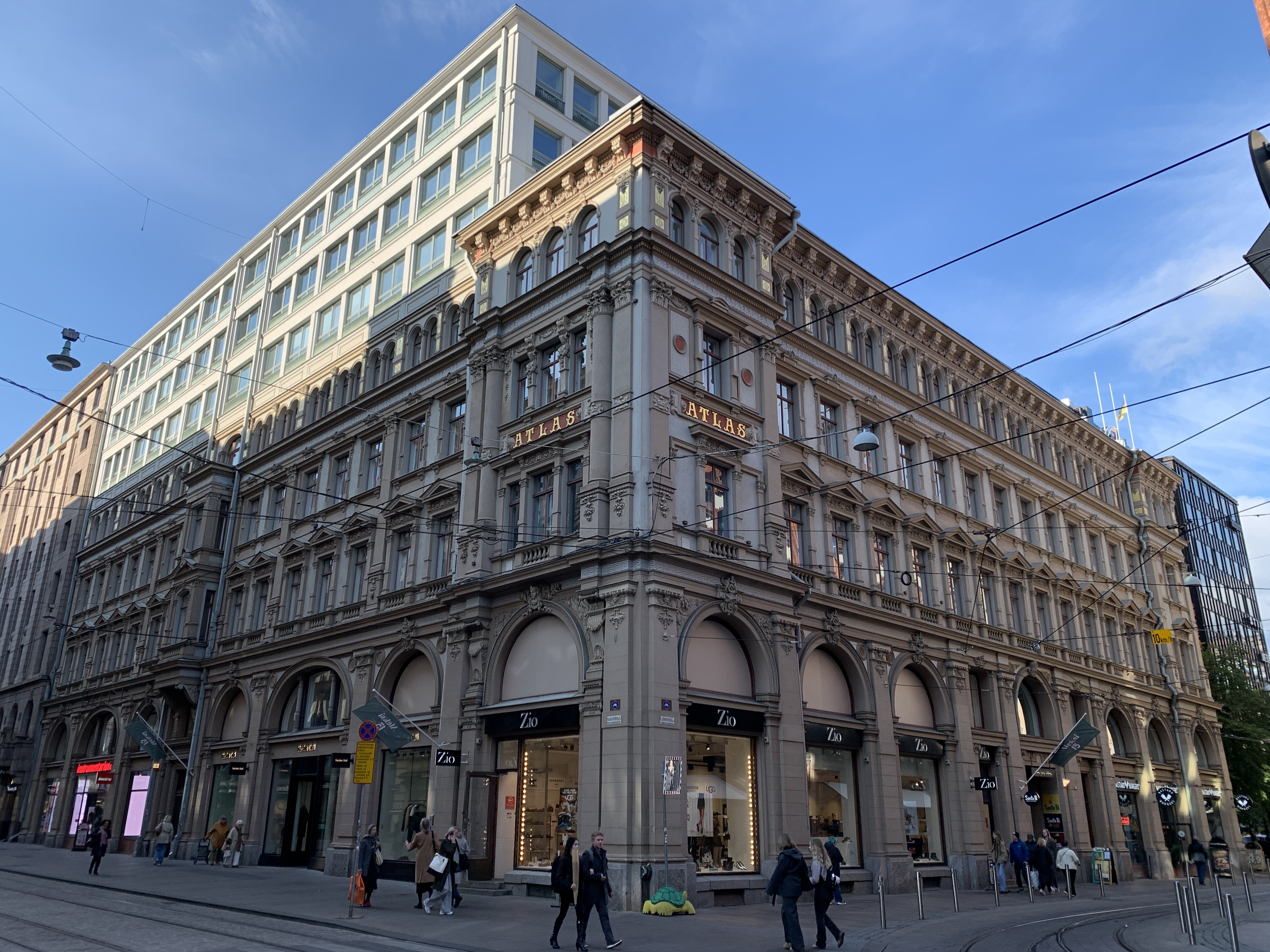
Building at Aleksanterinkatu 15 in Helsinki, former head office of Luotto-Pankki absorbed by KOP in 1933

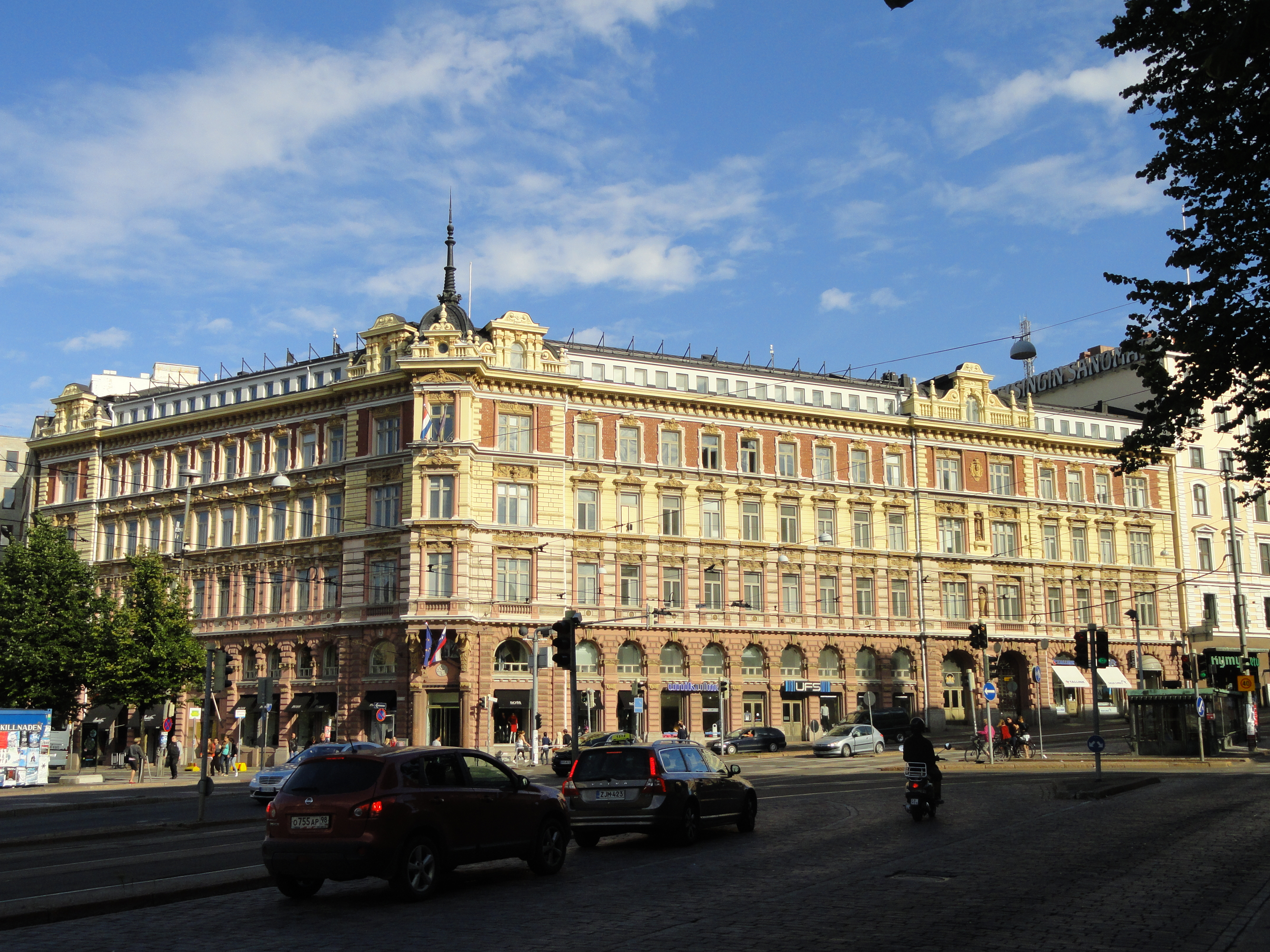
Building at Eteläesplanadi 24 in Helsinki, former head office of the Finnish Agricultural Joint-Stock Bank absorbed by KOP in 1958

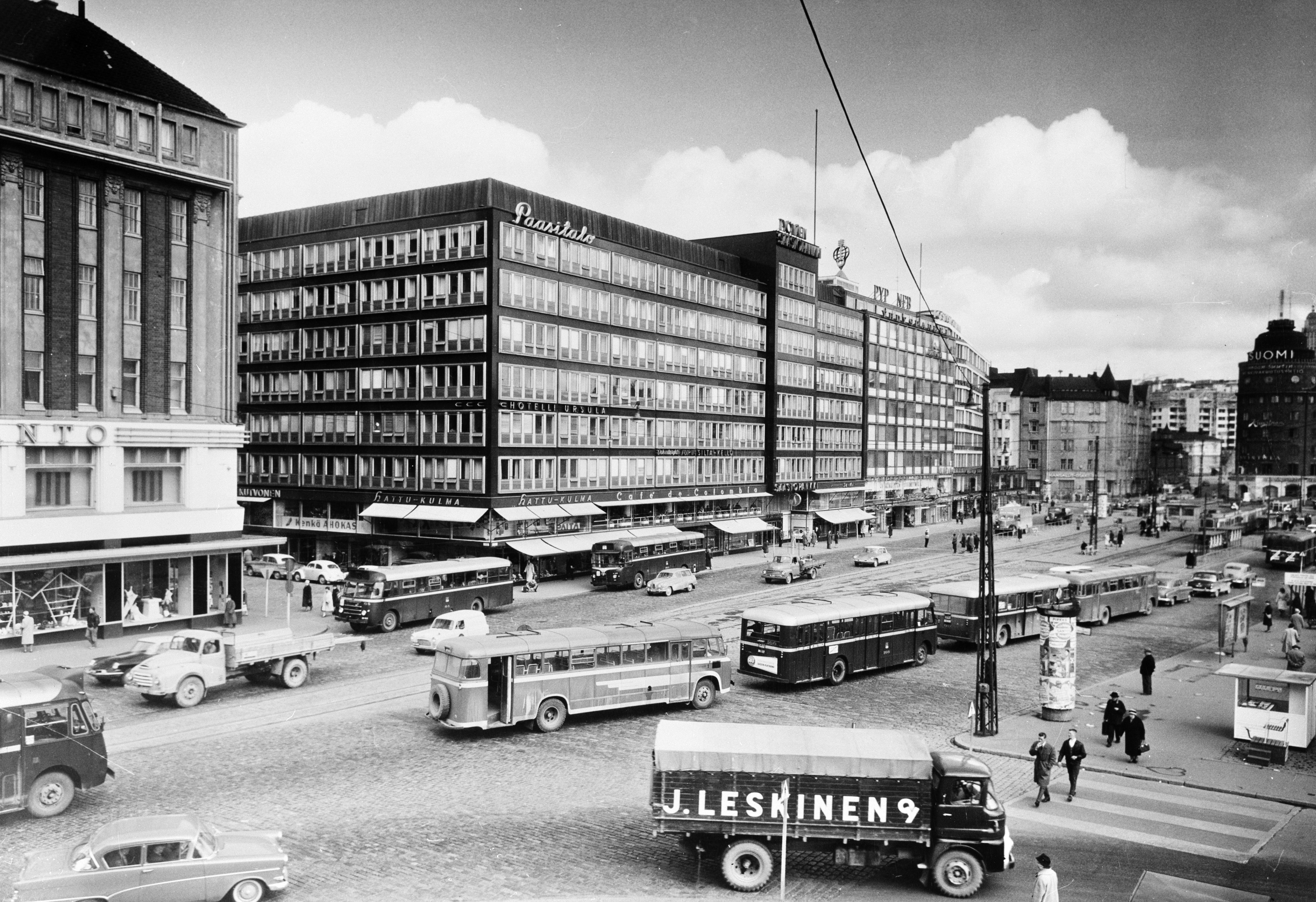
Building at Siltasaarenkatu 12-14 in Helsinki, former head office of the National Workers' Savings Bank absorbed by KOP in 1992

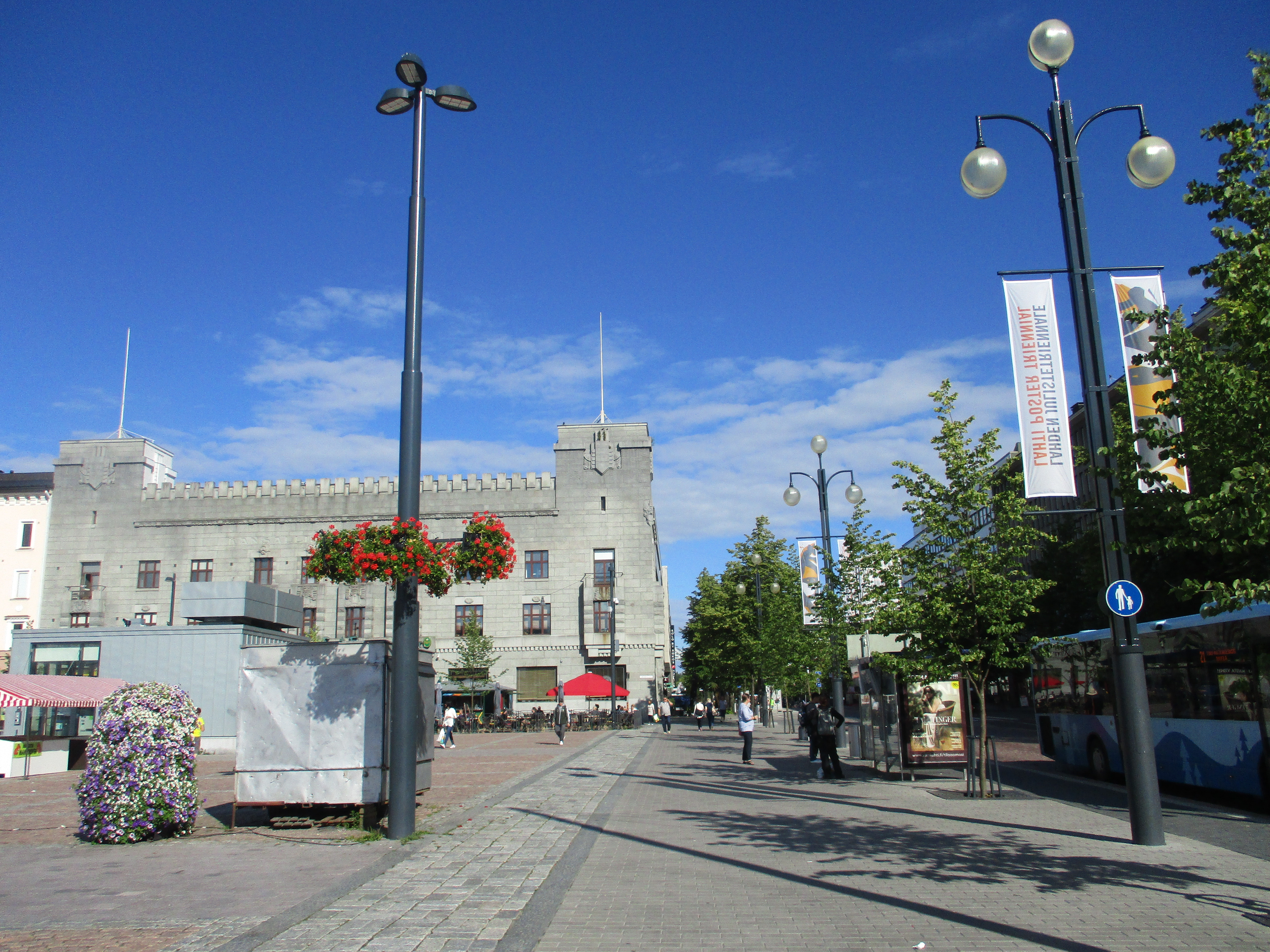
Former KOP branch building in Lahti

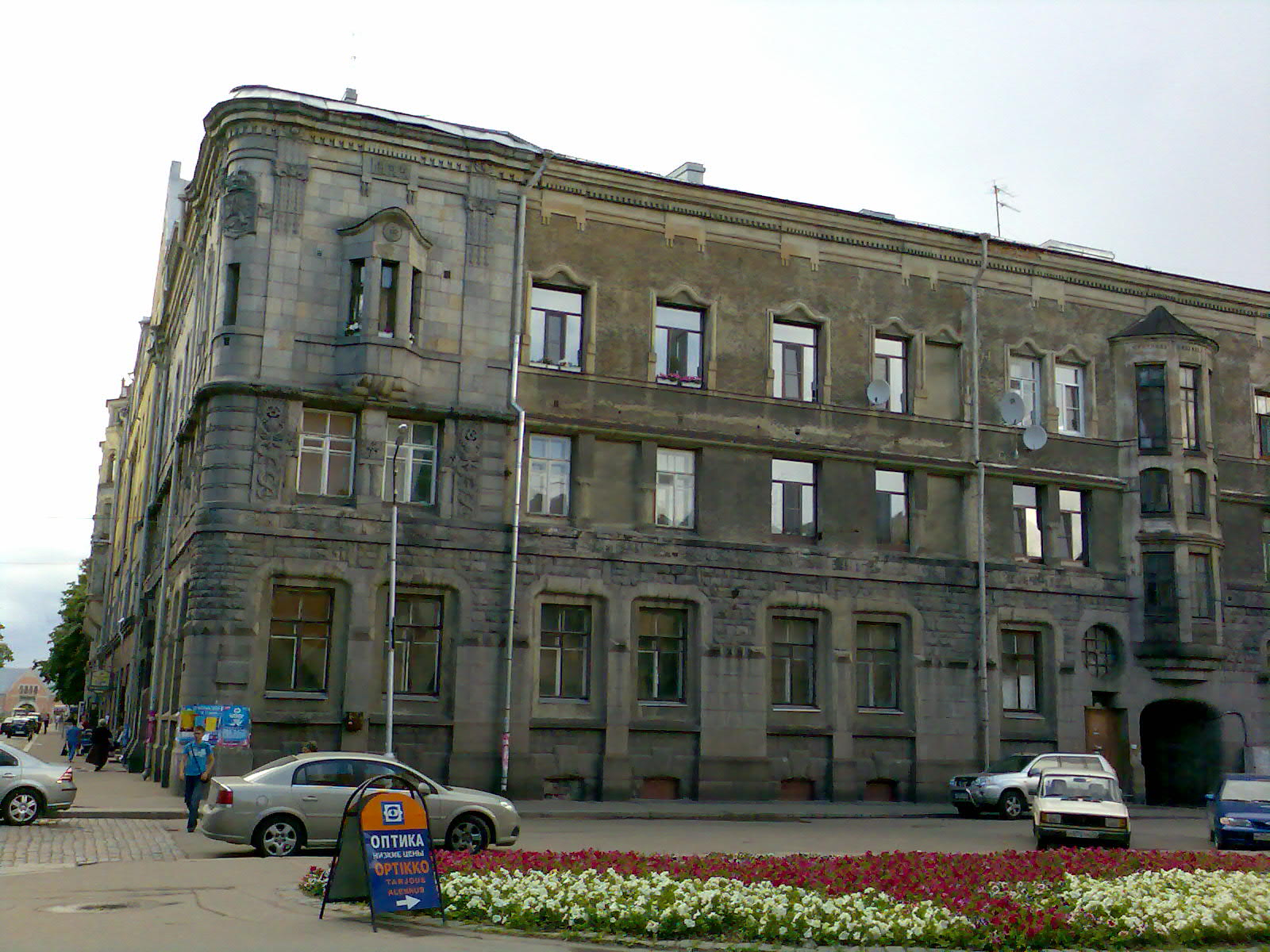
Former branch in Vyborg

== Chief executives ==
- Otto Hjelt (1889–1892)
- Fredrik Nybom (1892–1914)
- J. K. Paasikivi (1914–1934)
- Mauri Honkajuuri (1934–1948)
- Matti Virkkunen (1948–1975)
- Veikko Makkonen (1975–1983)
- Jaakko Lassila (1983–1991)
- Pertti Voutilainen (1991–1995)

== Buildings ==
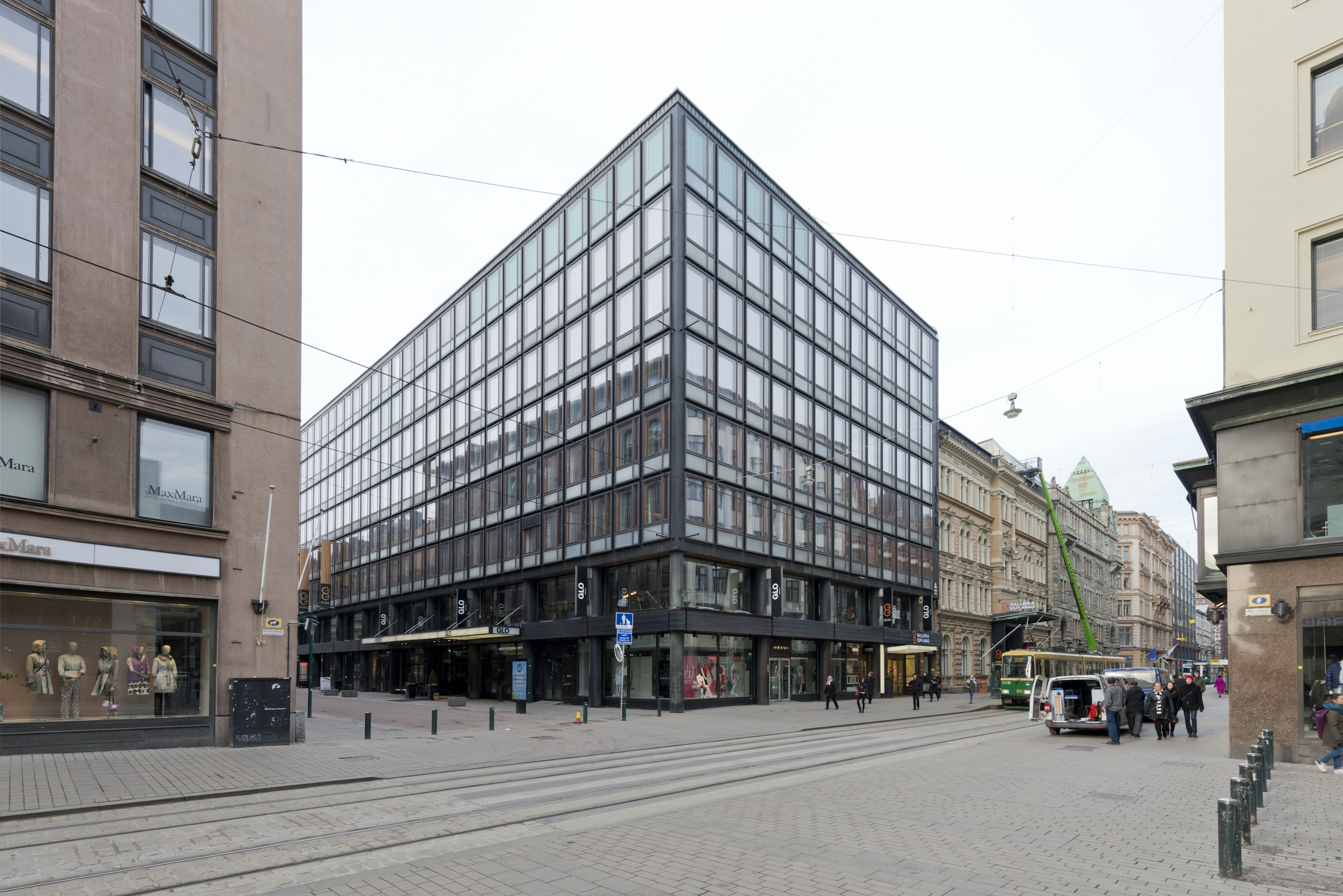
KOP head office extension at Aleksanterinkatu 40, completed 1962

KOP was originally founded in 1890 with its first branch at No. 17 of Aleksanterinkatu in Helsinki. Its then relocated across the street at No. 42, in a building designed by architect Theodor Höijer and completed in 1893. The bank expanded its head office complex there, first in 1925 with design by Onni Tarjanne, then again in and 1962 with design by Antero Pernaja and Nils-Henrik Sandell. In 1972, KOP acquired the adjacent and iconic Pohjola Insurance building (Aleksanterinkatu 44), completed 1901 on a design by Gesellius, Lindgren, Saarinen. KOP kept operating there until 1997, when the Finnish head office operations of Merita Bank were centralized at the former SYP head office.

The KOP branch in Lahti, a stark granite fortress-like building designed by Vilho Penttilä, was completed in 1913. It also housed a post office.

== See also ==
- List of banks in Finland
