= Bankgirot =

Payment clearing system in Sweden

Bankgirot is a proprietary clearing system (a giro) in Sweden used for transactions such as bill payments. It is owned by multiple Swedish banking conglomerates.

The clearing system is connected with the banks enabling payments to be received directly into bank accounts. Swedish Bankgiro numbers are in principle only short versions of bank account numbers. They have seven or eight digits. Bankgiro numbers can't be used when paying from other countries or in other currencies than SEK. Instead the IBAN number of the actual bank account should be used for that.

== History ==
Bankgirot was started in 1959. Postgirot (now called PlusGirot), the main competitor, having its own account system, was not able to offer deposits into bank accounts and still does not generally do so except to Nordea bank accounts.

Nordea was obliged to withdraw from involvement in Bankgirocentralen's operations related to Bankgirot for competitive reasons when it acquired Postgirot Bank (now PlusGirot) in 2002.

In 2012 Bankgirot established second-fast electronic payments, used for a mobile phone payment system called Swish.

== Owners ==
Bankgirot is operated by Bankgirocentralen (BGC), which is in turn owned by the following banks:

- SEB
- Nordea
- Handelsbanken
- Swedbank
- Danske Bank (Swedish branch)
- Skandiabanken
- Kaupthing Bank (Swedish branch)
- Länsförsäkringar Bank

== See also ==
- Bankgiro, the corresponding Norwegian system (the names of the two articles differ only in the use of the definite article in one case). Bankgirot is the name of the system in Sweden, while the account numbers are called Bankgiro numbers (Swedish: Bankgironummer).
