= EFaktura =

Norwegian electronic billing system

eFaktura is a Norwegian electronic billing system issued by Nets Branch Norway AS (Nets). The system involves both business-to-customer (B2C) systems, branded as eFaktura, and business-to-business (B2B) branded as eFaktura B2B. The system is built upon the bankgiro system used for online banking.

Use of eFaktura require the customer to use an online banking system from a Norwegian bank. Because all banks are connected to BBS, there is no discrimination between customers of different banks. Any company or organisation can sign an eFaktura agreement with their bank (though usually for a typically five-digit NOK startup fee) and send electronic bills to any client as long as they have a Norwegian online banking account. There is no requirement for the two to use the same bank. The ordinary eFaktura includes a specification of the bill, and the entire bill or invoice can be seen in the online banking system, and printed if so desired. eFaktura was launched in 2000.

For companies the eFaktura B2B has been developed. Companies using electronic billing need to be able to import the invoice directly into the accounting software of the company. Nets offers services to send out paper bills to any company not able to receive electronic billing. eFaktura B2B was launched in 2006.
