= PlusGirot =

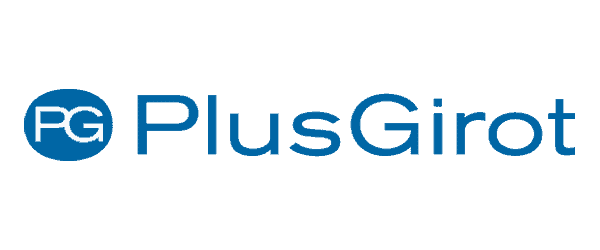
PlusGirot

PlusGirot (formerly PostGirot) is a Swedish money transaction system, owned by Nordea. PlusGirot is one of two proprietary clearing systems used for regular transactions such as bill payments in Sweden.

Postgirot was developed by Posten, the Swedish postal service, and was wholly separate from the banking system. This made transfers between the two systems difficult. The competing system Bankgirot was owned and operated by the banks.

The deregulation of postal services in Sweden prompted a sale of Postgirot; initially there were plans to merge the two clearing systems, but it was halted due to objections from the Swedish Competition Authority. Instead, Postgirot applied for a banking license and became a member of Bankgirot in 2002, enabling it to take deposits and carry out transactions with other banks. Following this it was acquired by Nordea and renamed PlusGirot.
