= Yhdyspankki =

Former Finnish bank

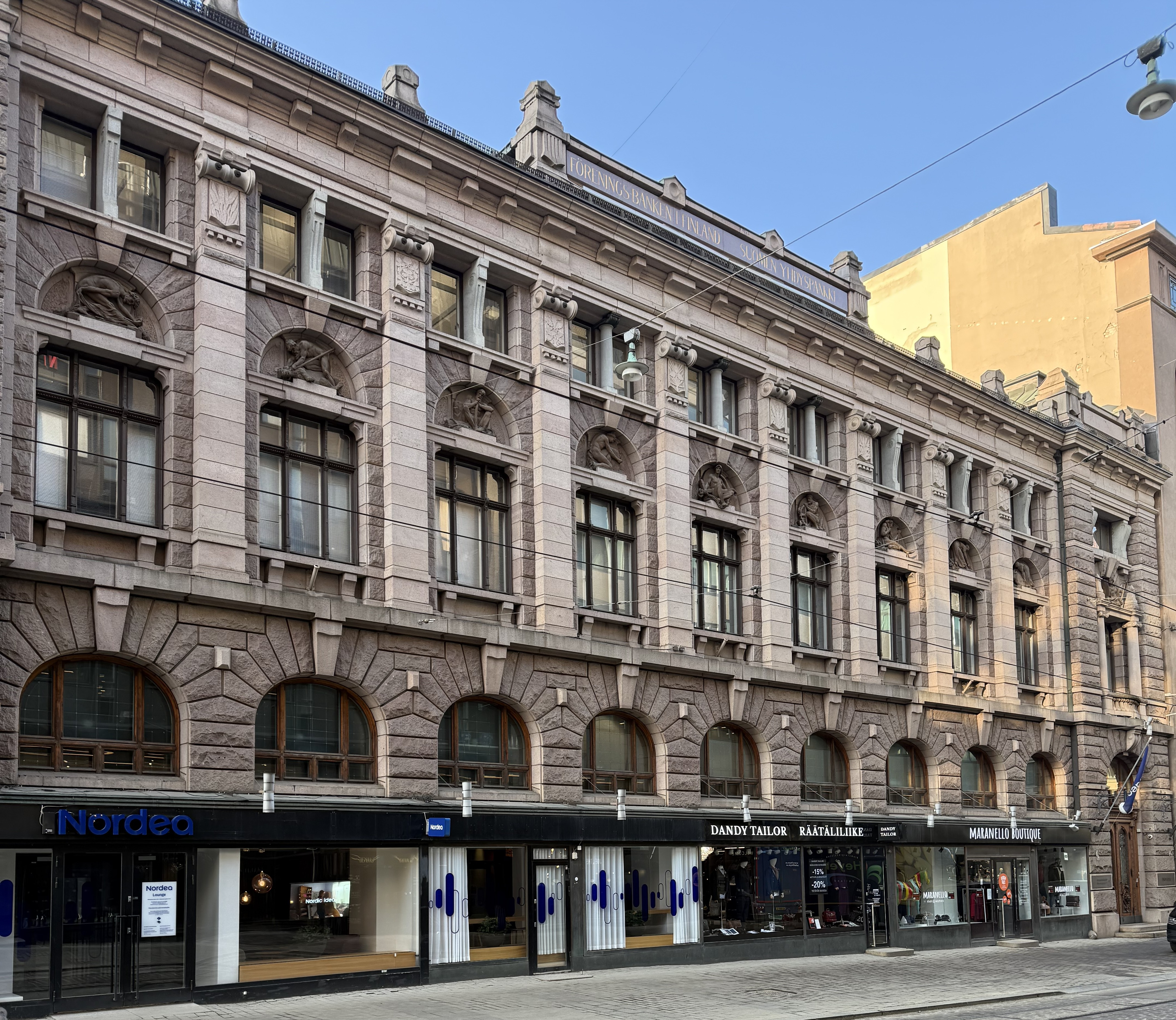
Head office building from 1898 to 1936; lately Nordea Bank Museum

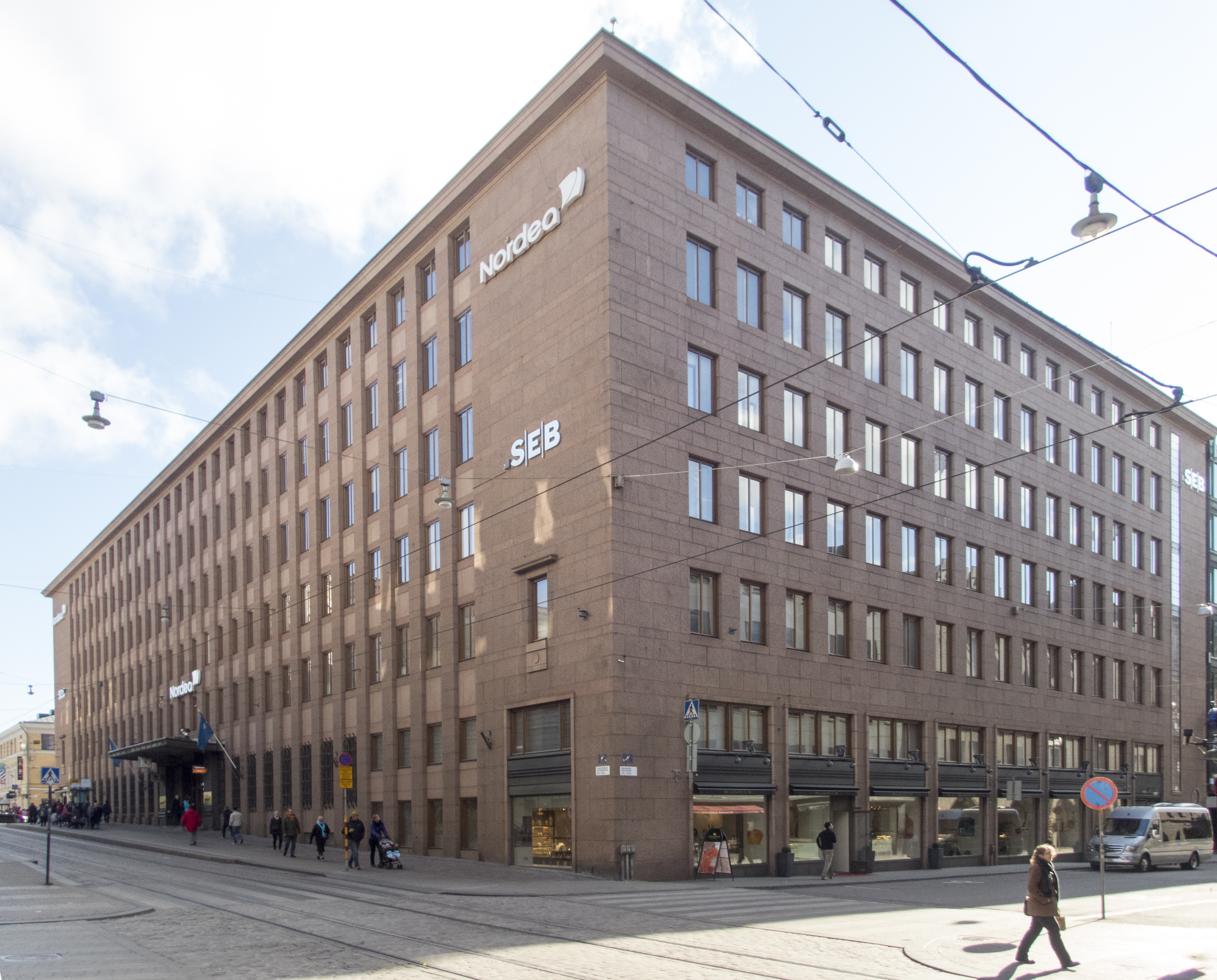
Head office building from 1936 to 1995, photographed in 2016 with the Nordea logo on top

Yhdyspankki (lit. 'Union Bank') was a major bank in Finland, from its establishment in 1862 until its merger in 1995 with its longtime rival Kansallis-Osake-Pankki (KOP) to form what would become Nordea.

The bank initially went by the full name Suomen Yhdyspankki (Swedish: Föreningsbanken i Finland, lit. 'Union Bank of Finland'), abbreviated as SYP. In 1919, it merged with Pohjoismaiden Osakepankki (full name Pohjoismaiden Osakepankki Kauppaa ja Teollisuutta varten, abbreviated Pohjoispankki, Swedish: Nordiska Aktiebanken för Handel och Industri, lit. 'Nordic Joint Stock Bank for Trade and Industry'), which had been established in 1873 in Vyborg by German interests and relocated 1907 to Helsinki. That landmark combination, the first major merger in Finland, resulted in the combined entity's renaming as Pohjoismaiden Yhdyspankki (Swedish: Nordiska Föreningsbanken, lit. 'Nordic Union Bank'), abbreviated as PYP. In 1975, the bank reverted to its original name Suomen Yhdyspankki / SYP.

SYP / PYP absorbed several banks during its existence, including Privatbanken i Helsingfors (lit. 'Private Bank of Helsinki', est. 1896 in Helsinki); Käsipankki (Finnish: Suomen Käsityöläis-Osakepankki, Swedish: Handtverkare-Aktiebanken i Finland, lit. 'Craftsmen's Joint-Stock Bank of Finland', est. 1917 in Helsinki); and Helsingin Osakepankki (est. 1913 in Helsinki).

== History ==
=== Union Bank of Finland (1862–1919) ===
Henrik Borgström the Younger was instrumental in the creation of Suomen Yhdyspankki, while his father Henrik Borgström the Elder also played an important advisory role. He had initially proposed the establishment of a Finnish Agricultural Bank (Suomen Maanviljelyspankki) to support the creation in 1860 of the Finnish Mortgage Association (Suomen Hypoteekkiyhdistys) by purchasing its bonds, but that project was soon viewed as too narrow and a more autonomous design was eventually adopted. Suomen Yhdyspankki's founding general meeting was held in September 1861, and the bank began operations on 1 July 1862. It was the largest limited-liability company ever established in Finland by that time.

Suomen Yhdyspankki issued its own banknotes denominated in Finnish markka between 1866 and 1918, alongside the Bank of Finland.

=== Nordic Union Bank (1919–1975) ===
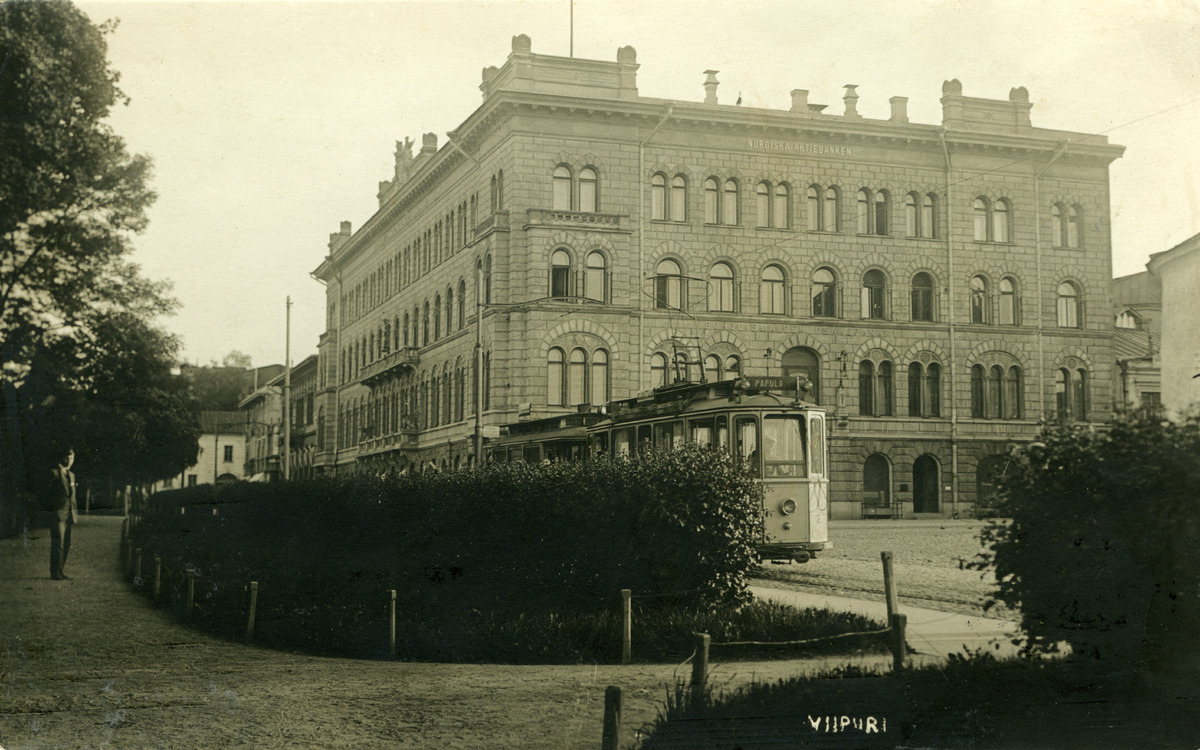
Former head office of Pohjoismaiden Osakepankki in Viipuri, photographed in the 1920s

In 1919, Suomen Yhdyspankki merged with Pohjoismaiden Osakepankki (lit. 'Nordic Joint-Stock Bank', est. 1873) and adopted the name Nordic Union Bank, abbreviated in Finnish as PYP. The Nordic Union Bank was the dominant bank for Finland's Swedish-speaking community, whereas Kansallis-Osake-Pankki (KOP) was its main competitor and peer among Finnish-speakers. The country's third-largest bank, Helsingin Osakepankki (HOP), was more focused than PYP on the Swedish-speaking customer base. These linguistic divides, however, lost potency in the aftermath of World War II.

In 1922, PYP absorbed Privatbanken i Helsingfors, a troubled small bank that had been established in 1896. In 1945, PYP absorbed Käsipankki.

=== Union Bank of Finland (1975–1995) ===
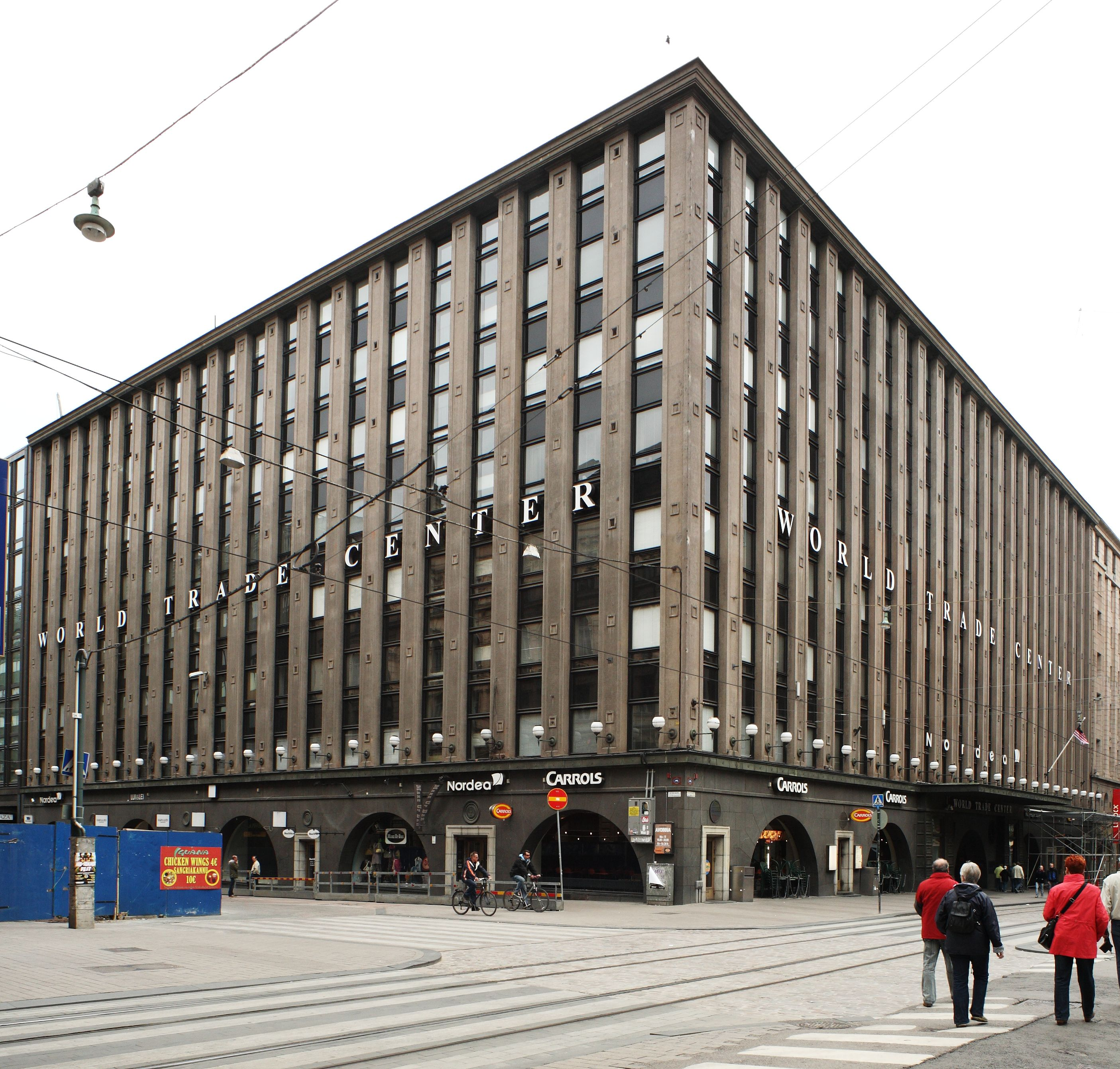
Former head office of Helsingin Osakepankki, itself inherited from the interwar Liittopankki, lately World Trade Center Helsinki

The bank reversed to its original name in 1975, as the reference to Nordic countries was felt as confusing with the increase in regional cross-border financial integration. In 1986, Suomen Yhdyspankki acquired and absorbed Helsingin Osakepankki in what has been described as Finland's first-ever takeover battle. Its network reached a peak with 444 branches by 1987, and nearly 10,400 employees by 1988. 1988 was also the historic peak of SYP's profits, and when KOP and Pohjola Insurance made an unsuccessful attempt at acquiring SYP with economist Pentti Kouri as head of the merged entity.

In 1990–1992, the group underwent restructuring. The listed group parent company was renamed Unitas, while the deposit-taking banking operations were transferred to a subsidiary that took the name Suomen Yhdyspankki. The group included other subsidiaries along side the "new" SYP, namely Stella (life insurance), Partita (investment company), and Huoneistokeskus (property company). The group went into-loss-making operation in 1991 and remained unprofitable in 1992, 1993 and 1994.

In 1993, SYP purchased 122 branches of the troubled Suomen Säästöpankki (SSP), an entity established in 1992 to address the crisis of Finnish Savings Banks and channel government assistance. In February 1995, it opened a branch in Estonia, being the first foreign bank to do so.

=== Merger with KOP and the birth of Nordea ===
In the wake of the 1990s Finnish banking crisis, Unitas eventually merged with its longtime competitor KOP in 1995 to create a new entity called Merita Bank. KOP shareholders received 41.7 percent of capital in the new entity. Then in 1997, Merita Bank merged with Sweden's Nordbanken to create MeritaNordbanken, which subsequently also acquired Denmark's Unibank and Norway's Christiania Bank og Kreditkasse. In 2000, the resulting group was renamed as Nordea.

== Leadership ==
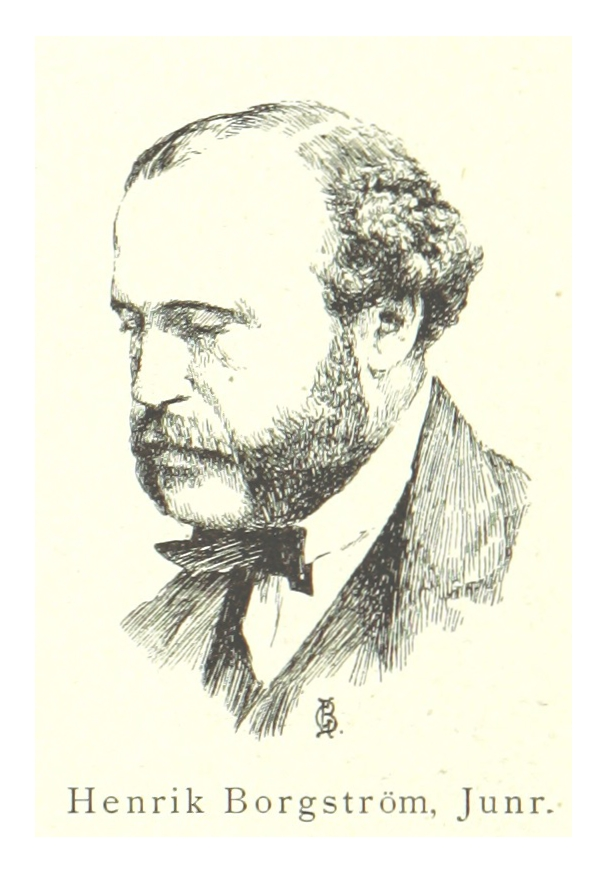
Henrik Borgström the Younger, founder of SYP

- Henrik Borgström the Younger (1862–1865)
- August Törnqvist (1865–1872)
- Jean Cronstedt (1872–1907)
- Alfred Norrmén (1907–1913)
- August Ramsay (1913–1919)
- Leonard von Pfaler (1919–1928)
- Alexander Frey (1928–1945)
- Rainer von Fieandt (1945–1955)
- Göran Ehrnrooth (1955–1970)
- Mika Tiivola (1970–1989)
- Ahti Hirvonen (1989–1992)
- Vesa Vainio (1992–1995)

== Buildings ==
The bank was originally located at the House of Nobility in Helsinki, then operated from a rented location on Unioninkatu. It then commissioned a permanent head office at No. 36B of Aleksanterinkatu, designed by architect Gustaf Nyström. That building was completed in 1898, the first in Helsinki with a facade entirely made of Finnish granite, including allegories by prominent Finnish sculptor Walter Runeberg.

Privatbanken i Helsingfors, the Helsinki bank that PYP took over in 1922, had a single branch with an opulent banking hall on Esplanadi. That gem of Finnish Art Nouveau, designed by architect Lars Sonck and completed in 1904, was left in disrepair by PYP until its renovation in the 1960s, now a protected landmark known as Jugendsali.

The building at Keskuskatu 1B in Helsinki was designed by architect Eliel Saarinen and completed in 1921. It served as head office of Käsipankki from 1924 to its acquisition by PYP in 1945. It was renovated in the mid-2010s to become the flagship helsinki showroom of the Artek furniture brand cofounded by Alvar Aalto.

In the 1930s, PYP acquired several lots across Fabianinkatu, at Aleksanterinkatu 30-34, and erected a larger head office building there, designed by architect Ole Gripenberg, which was completed in 1936. In 1937, PYP also completed the building at Aleksanterinkatu 36 A, also designed by Gripenberg and altered several times since then. The building at Aleksanterinkatu 30-34 was renovated in 2018 and again in 2026. Nordea kept operations there until 2025, when it relocated to Aleksanterinkatu 36A.

The original SYP building at Aleksanterinkatu 36B served as registered office of Nordea Finland until February 2016, when the company relocated its legal domicile to the so-called Nordea Campus in the Vallila neighborhood of Helsinki. It underwent refurbishment in 2022, designed by local firm UKI Arkkitehdit, and has hosted the Nordea Bank Museum since then.

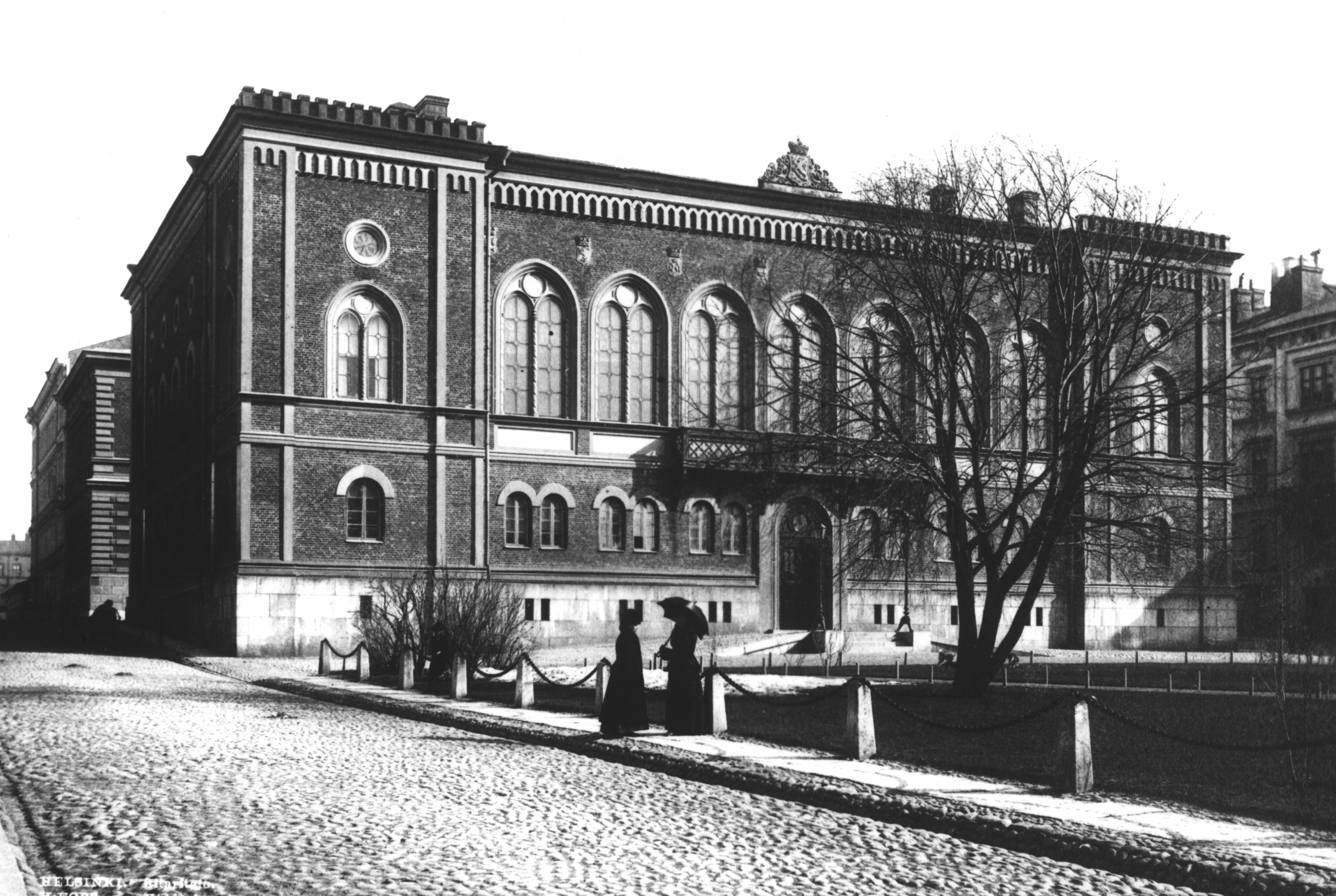
House of Nobility in Helsinki, the bank's original location, photographed in 1890

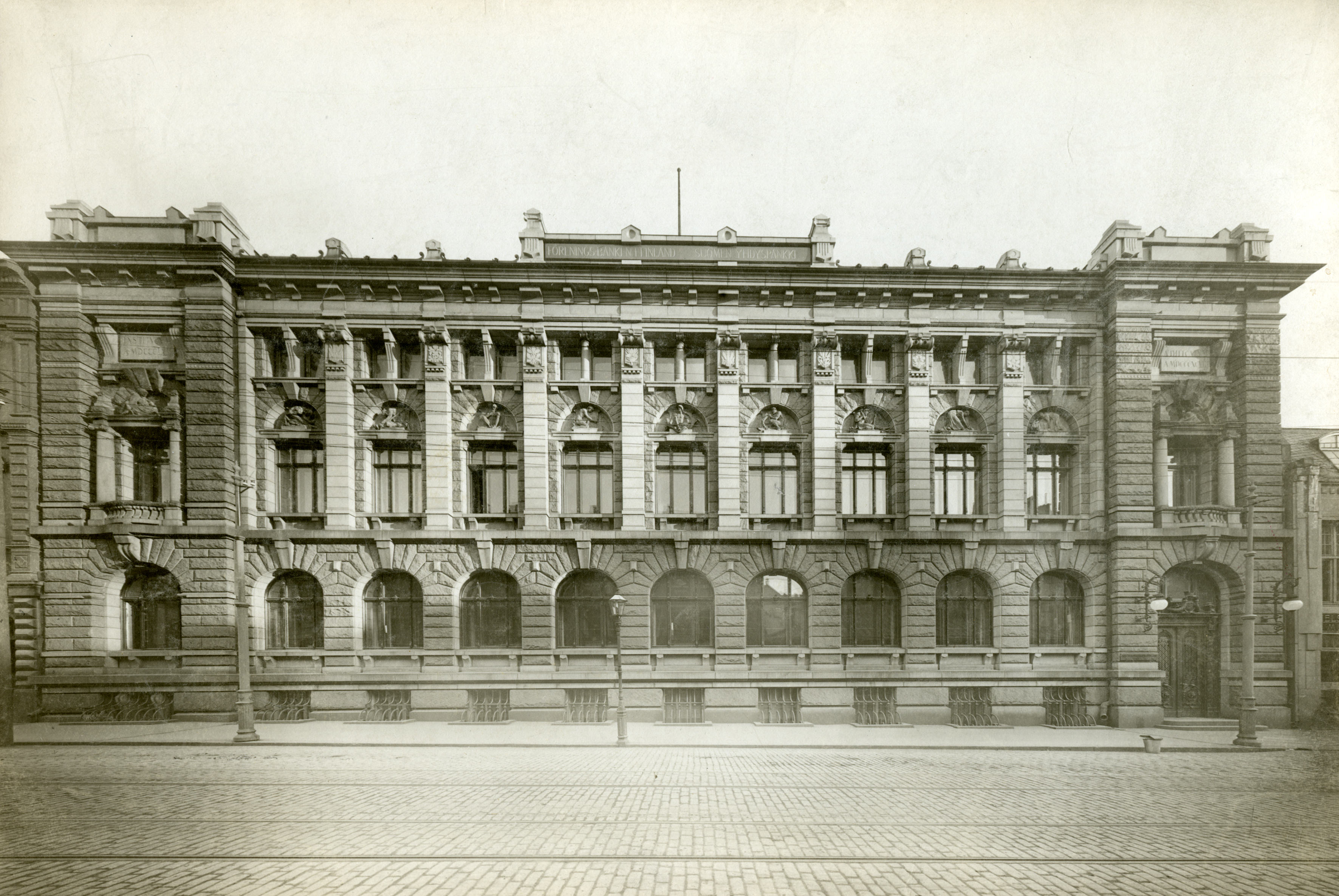
Head office building completed in 1898, Aleksanterinkatu 36B, photographed shortly after inauguration

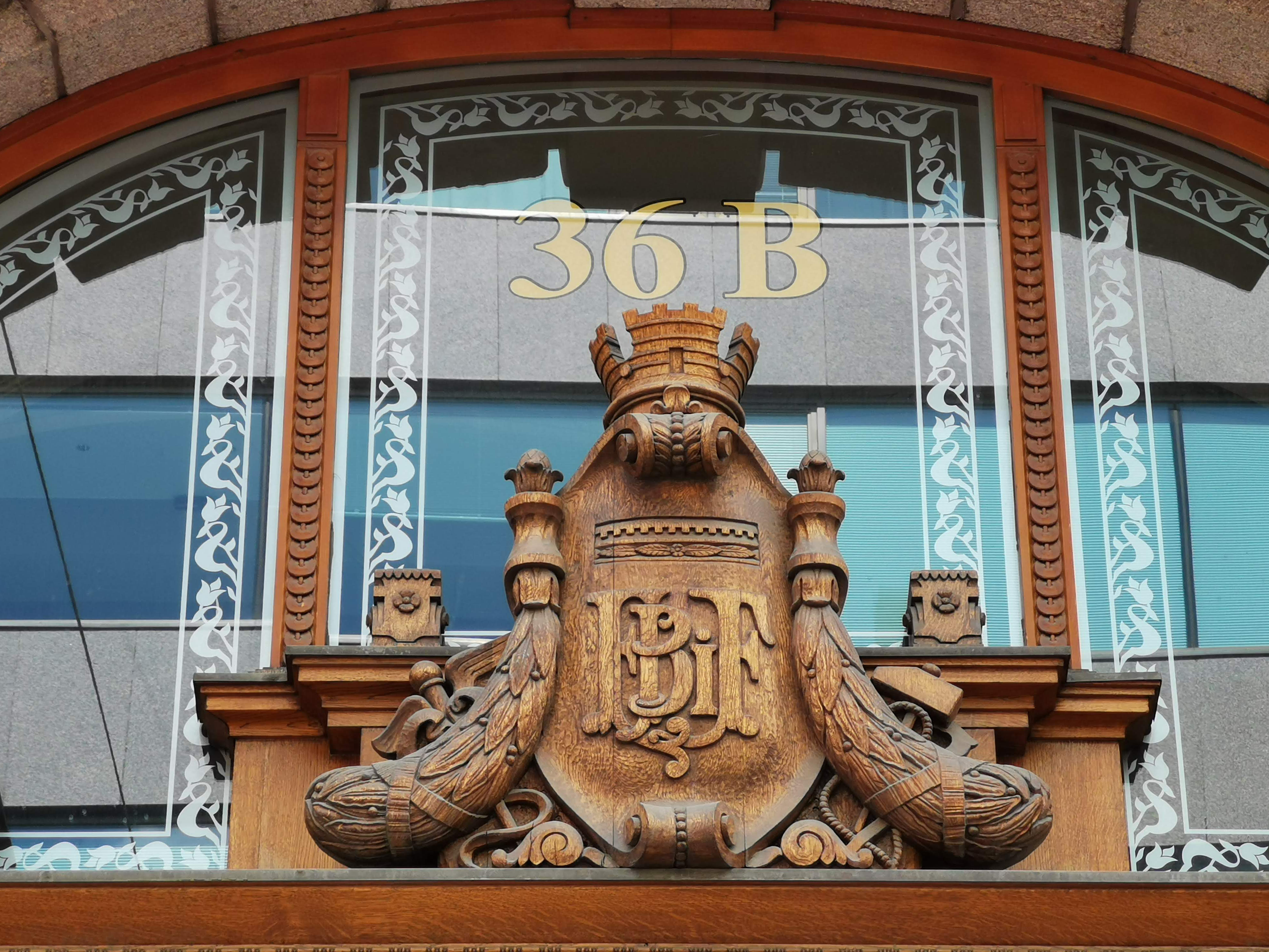
Detail showing the monogram FBiF, for Föreningsbanken i Finland

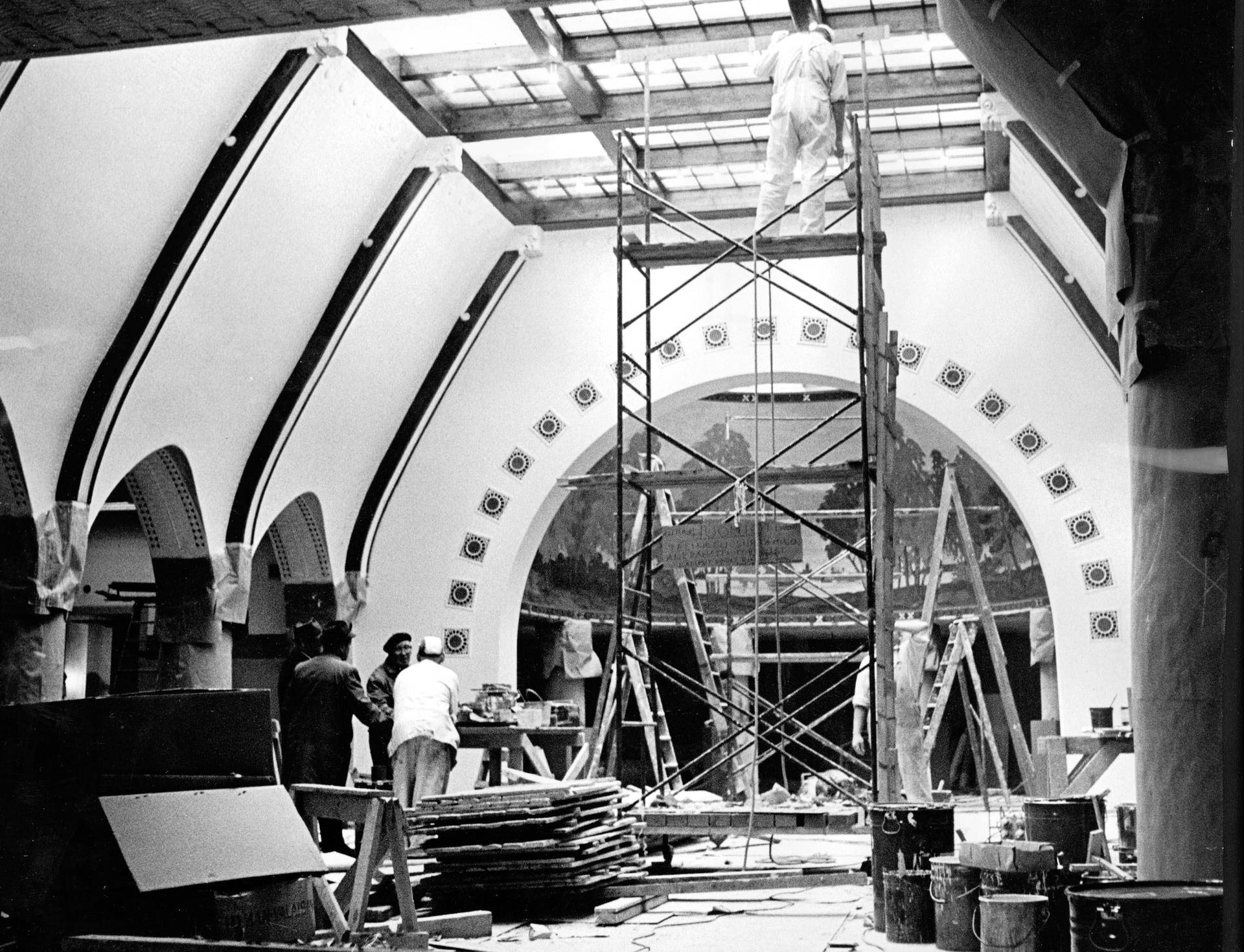
Former head office of Privatbanken i Helsingfors during renovation in 1967, now Jugendsali

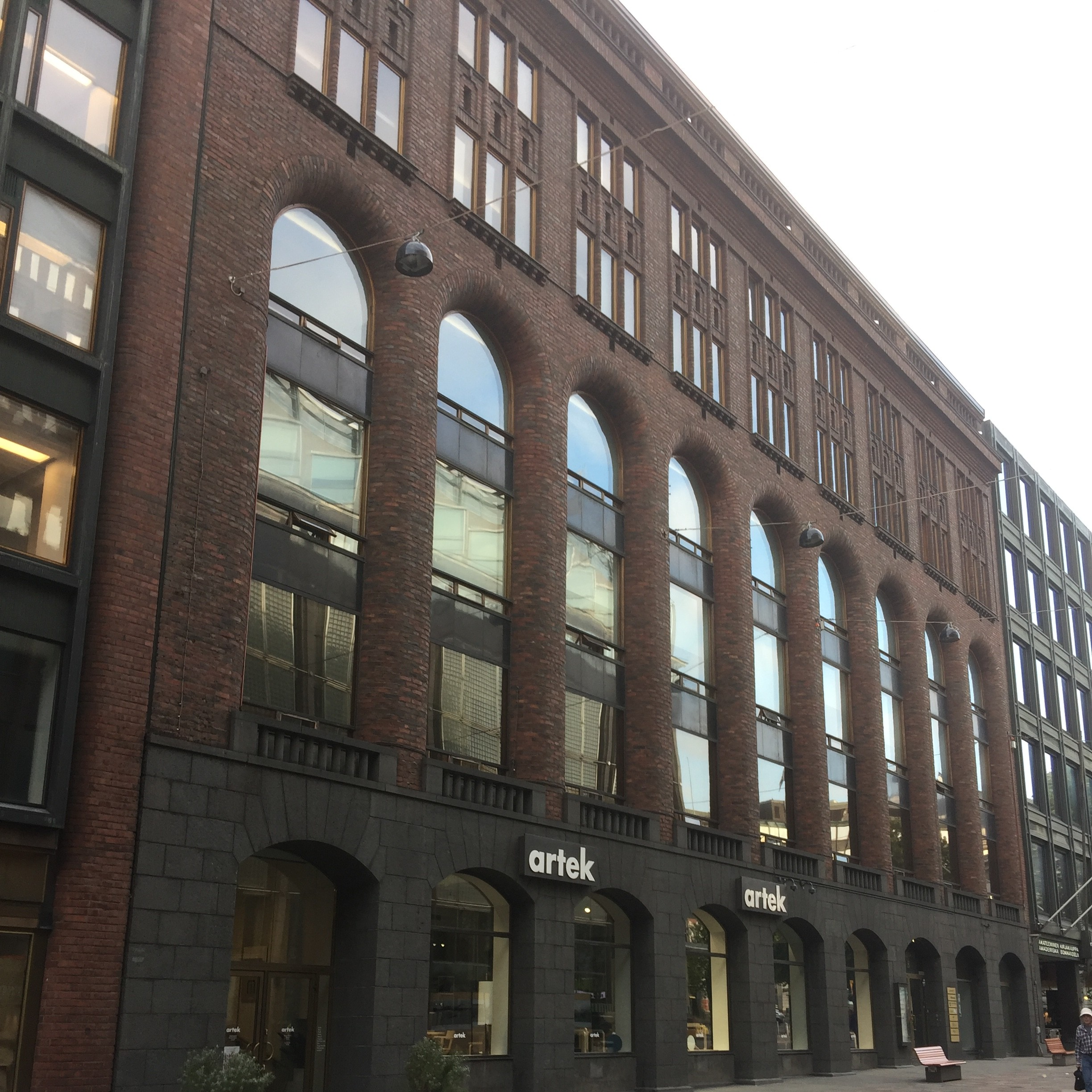
Former head office of Käsipankki, Keskuskatu 1B in Helsinki

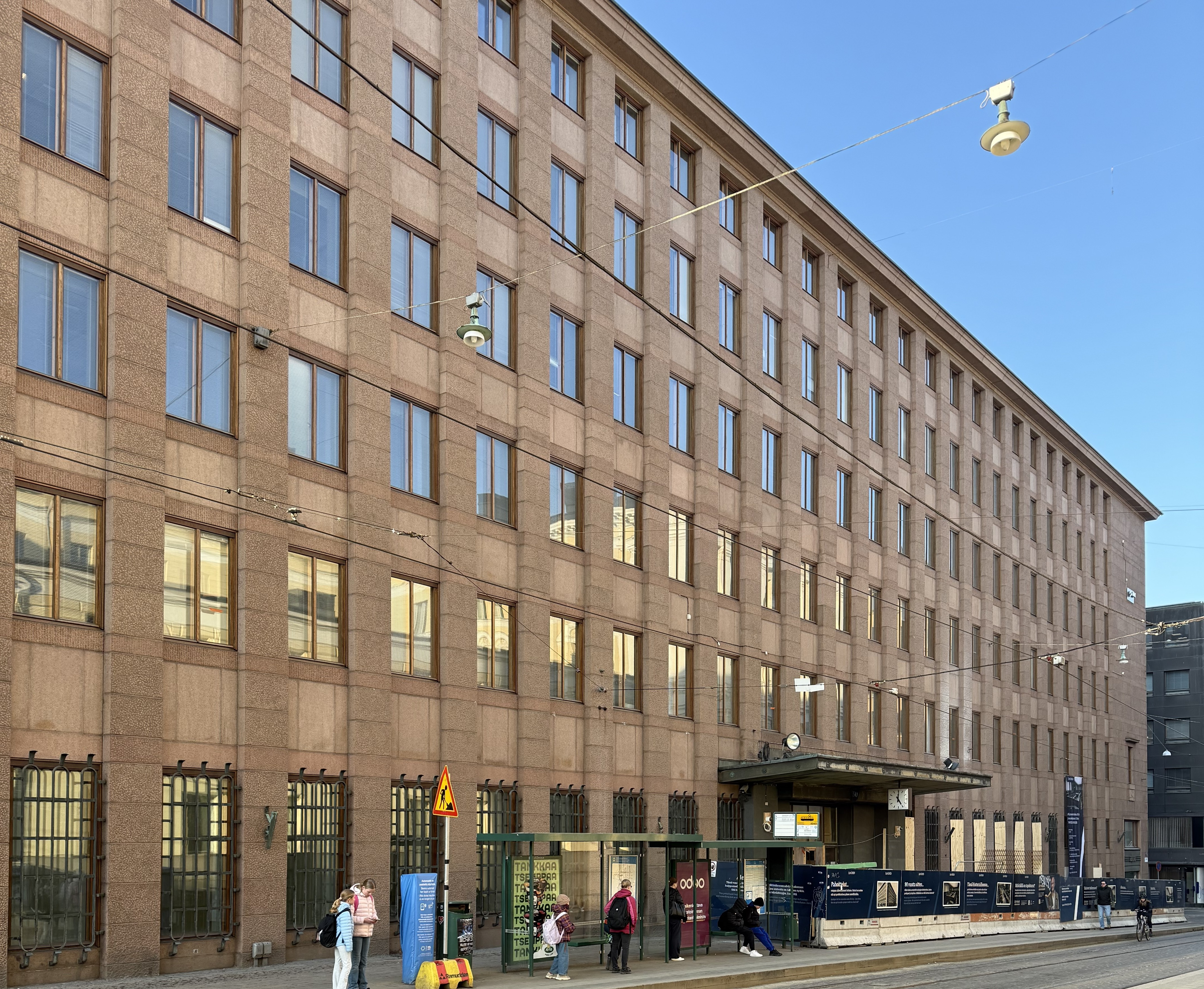
New PYP head office building completed in 1936, Aleksanterinkatu 30-34

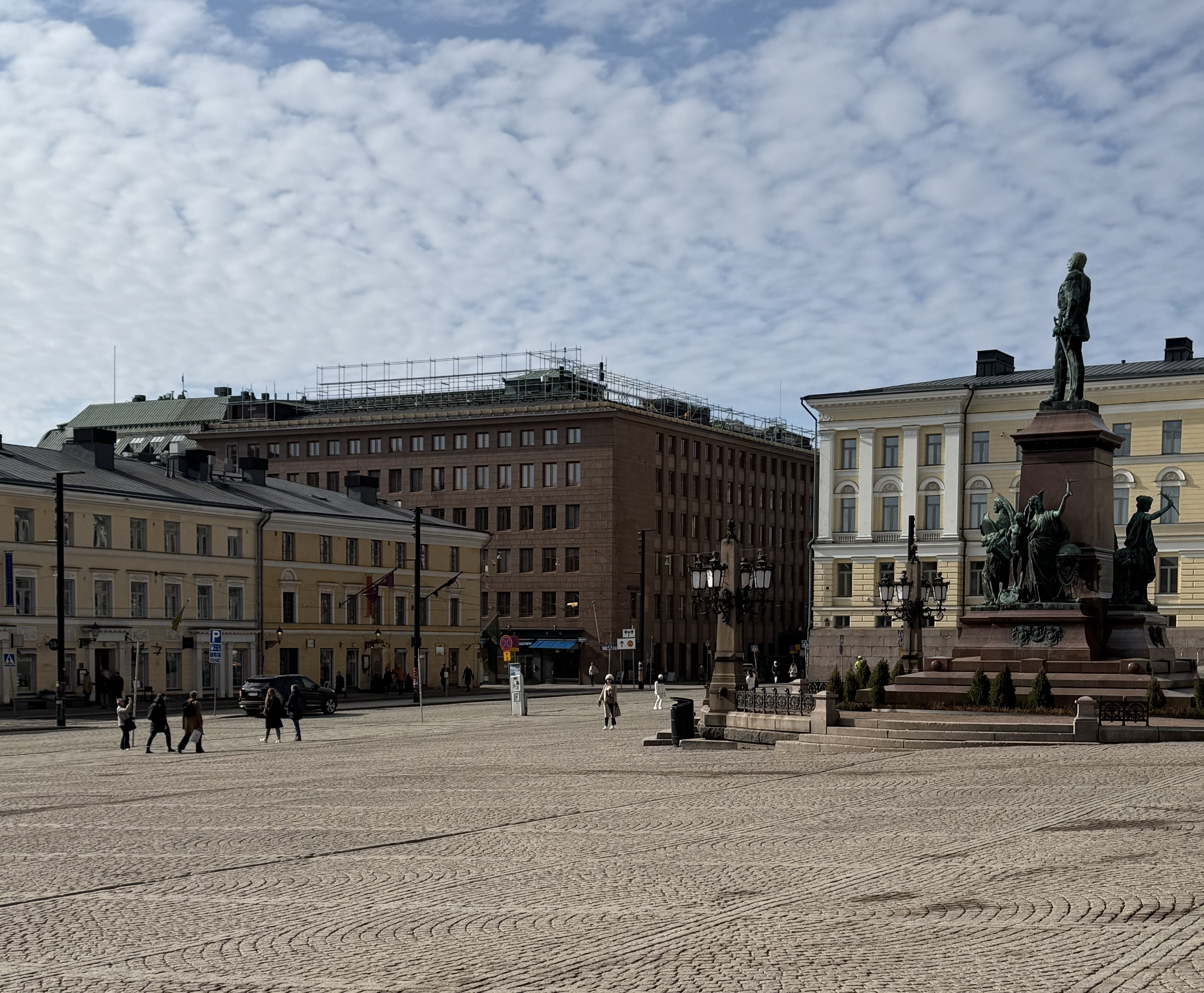
View of Senate Square from the northeast, showing the Yhdyspankki building's prominent presence

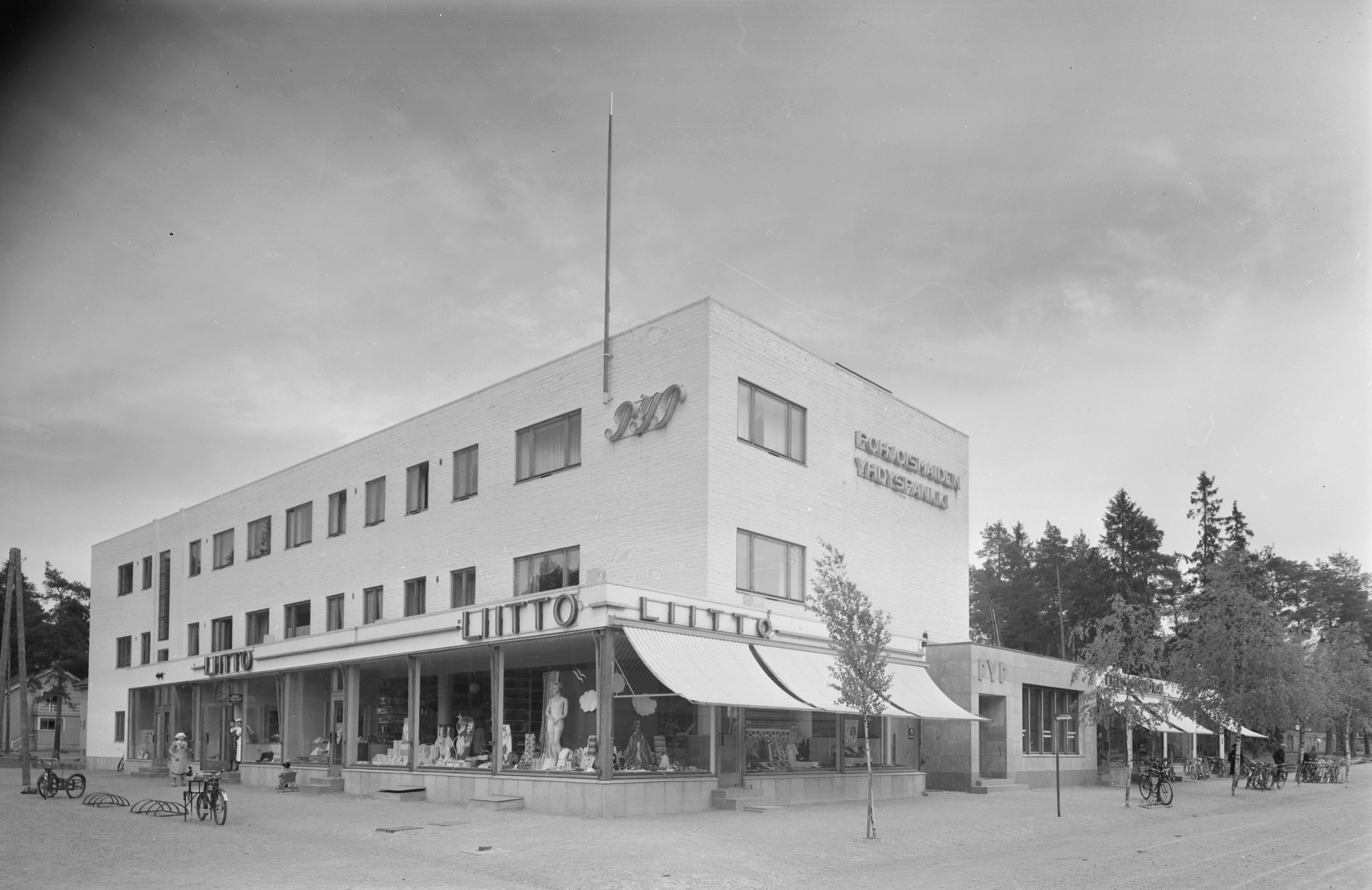
Branch building in Karhula, photographed in 1936

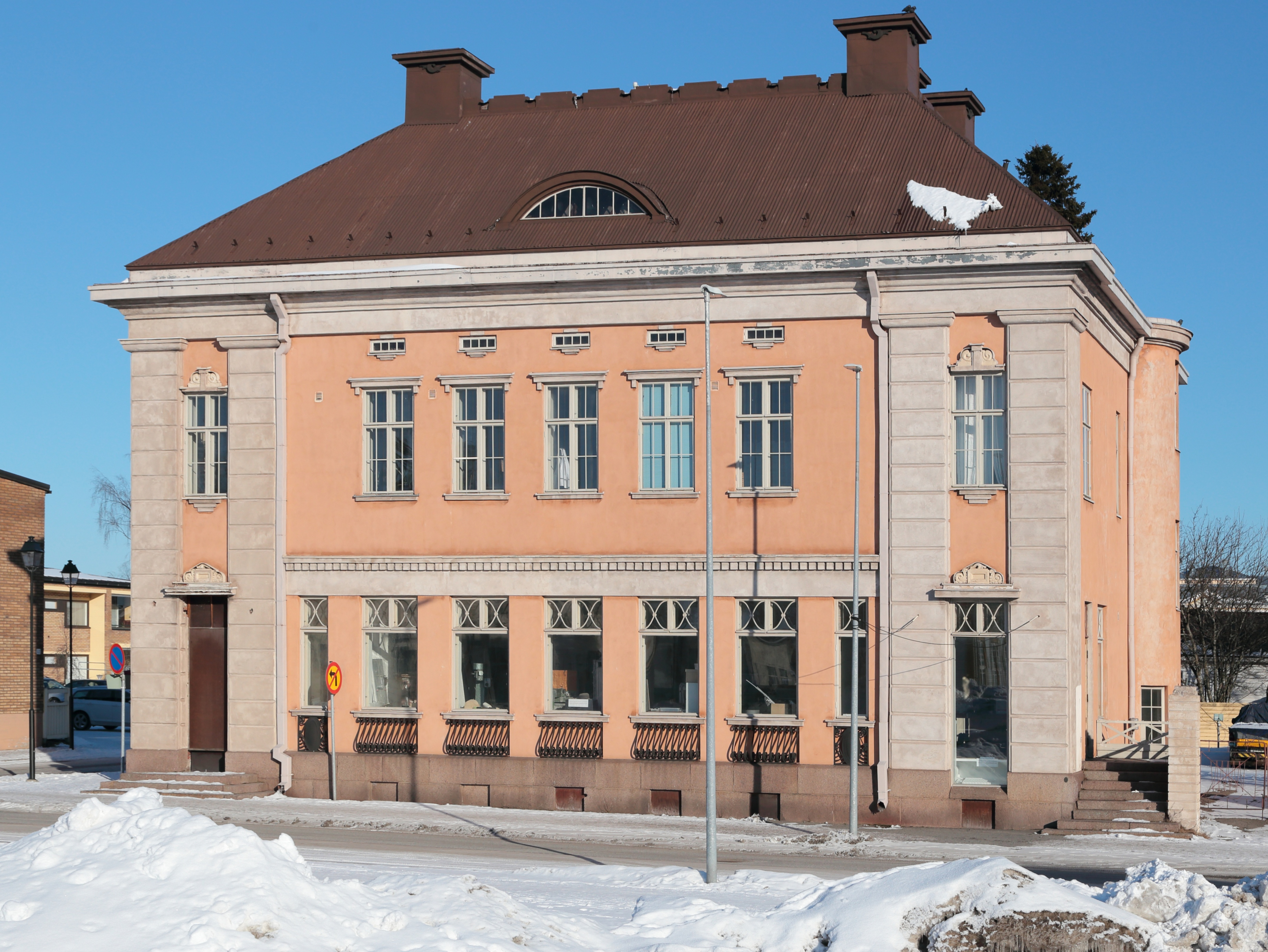
Former branch building in Raahe

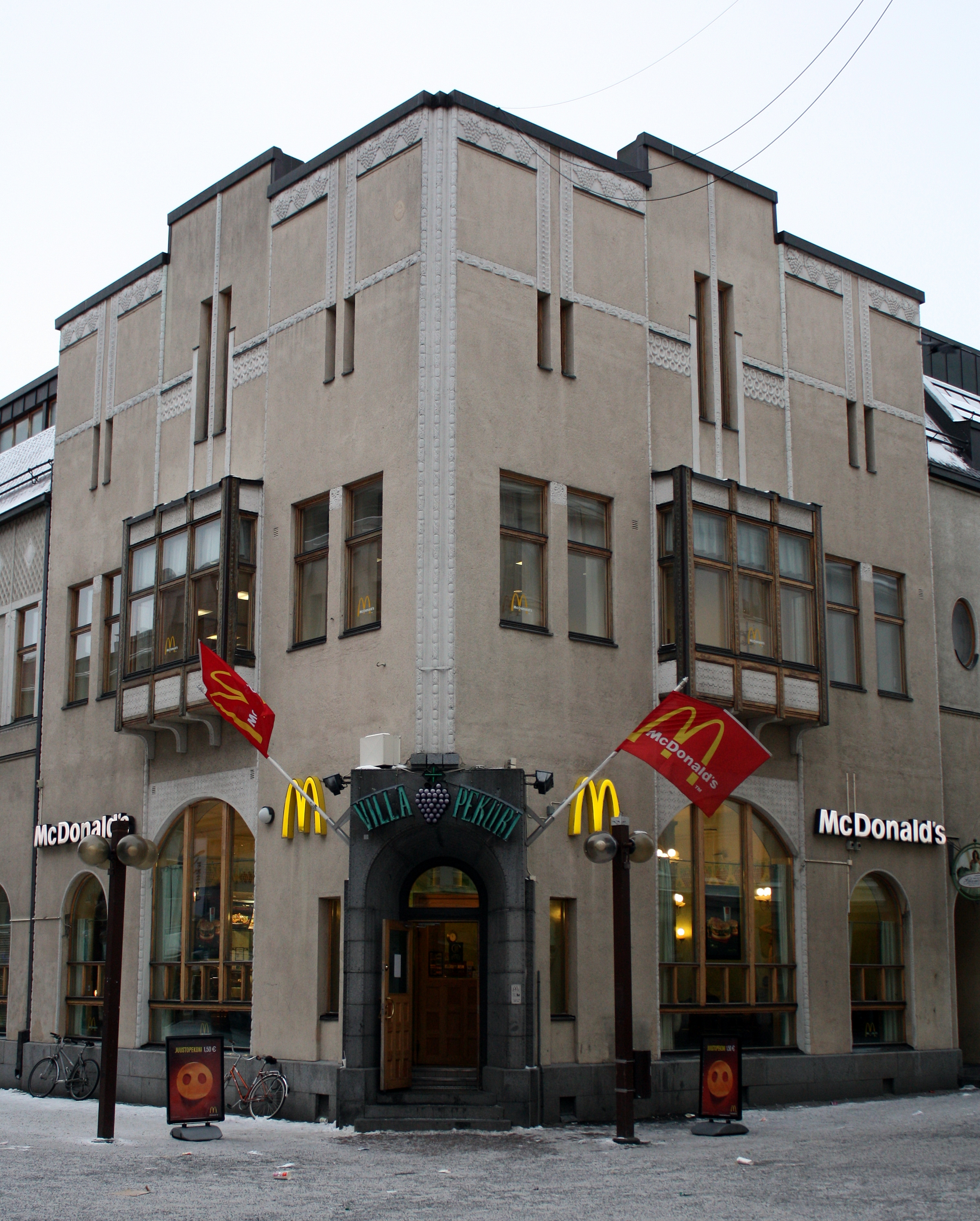
Former branch building in Oulu

== See also ==
- List of banks in Finland
- Valter Thomé, architect of several Union Bank branches
- Sinebrychoff family, prominent among SYP's early shareholders
