= Bankgiro =

Bankgiro is a Norwegian giro system used by all banks in the country, managed by Bankenes Betalingssentral (BBS). The system allows arbitrary transactions between private accounts in all Norwegian accounts using Norwegian krone. It is optimised for online banking, though it is also available via the post (Brevgiro), using a telephone (Telegiro) or based on automation, including the services Avtalegiro, Autogiro and eFaktura.

The system dates back to 1973, when the commercial banks and the saving banks created a common system, that could compete with the Postgiro system used by the postal bank, Postbanken. Use of Bankgiro was free until 1985. In the late 1990s, Postgiro was bought out by BBS and Postbanken went over to using Bankgiro.

== See also ==
- Bankgirot, the corresponding Swedish system
