= Pertti Voutilainen =

Finnish banker and businessman (1940–2026)

- Born: June 22, 1940; Outokumpu, Finland
- Died: 15 January 2026 (aged 85); Helsinki, Finland
- Occupations: Banker, businessman
- Known for: Served as a director of the Canadian mining company Agnico Eagle Mines

Pertti Juhani Voutilainen (22 June 1940 – 15 January 2026) was a Finnish banker and businessman.

== Life and career ==
Voutilainen was born in Outokumpu on 22 June 1940. He worked in the mining industry, beginning in 1964 at the Kotalahti Mine. In 1977, he was appointed Senior Vice President, Mining and Development, and in 1978, a member of the Board of Directors of Outokumpu.

He was the director of the Kansallis-Osake-Pankki (1991–1995).

Voutilainen served on the board of directors of the Canadian mining company Agnico Eagle Mines from 2005 until his death. In 2018–2019, Voutilainen failed to pay the tax authorities €181,000 in taxes. Voutilainen was sentenced to nine months' suspended imprisonment for aggravated tax fraud in November 2024.

Voutilainen died on 15 January 2026, at the age of 85.
