= PK-huset =

Building in Stockholm, Sweden

Coordinates: 59.3331°N 18.0703°E

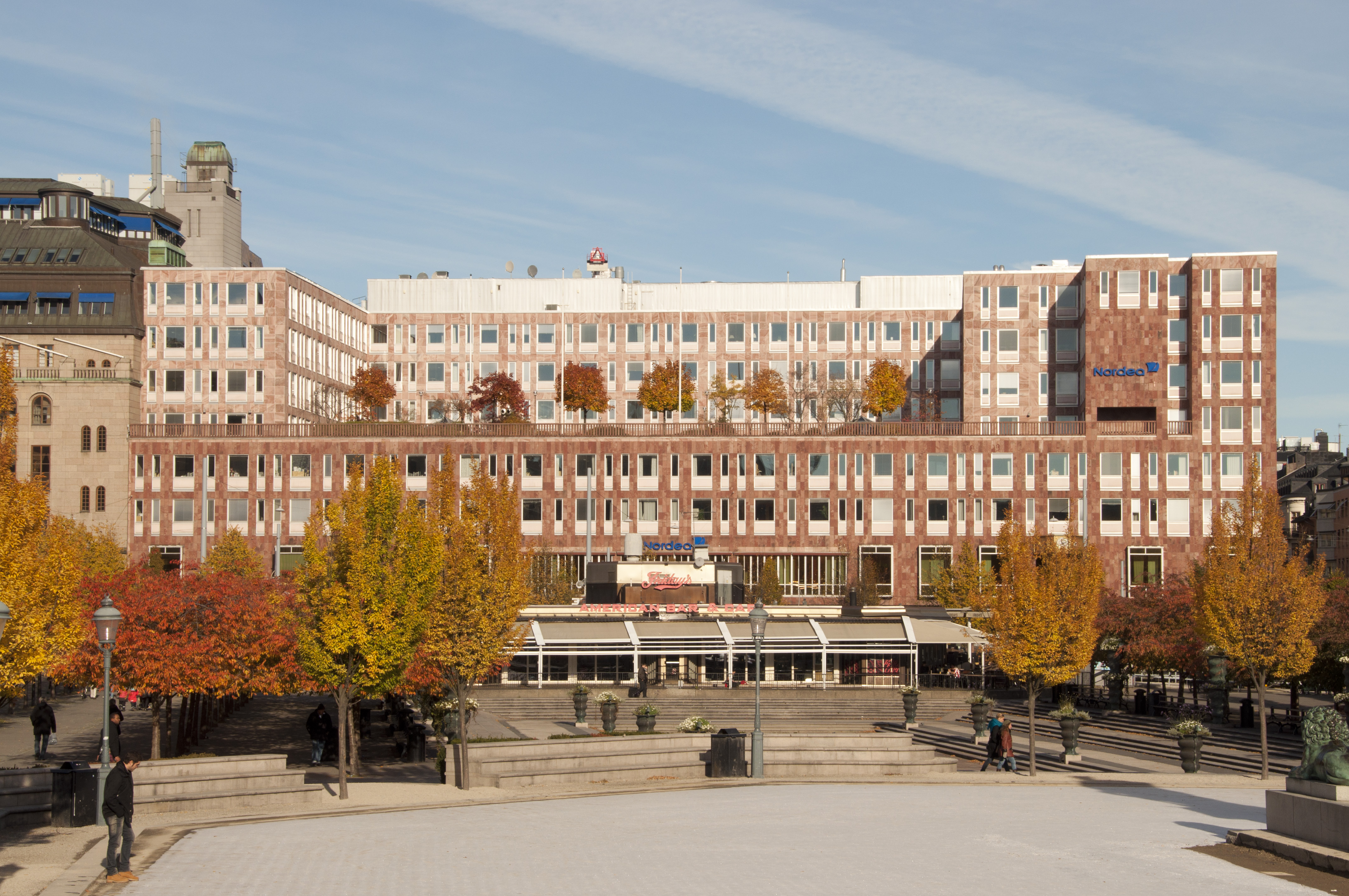
The outside of PK-huset at Kungsträdgården, in October 2010.

PK-huset (formerly PK-bankens hus) is a combined office and department store building at Hamngatan and Norrlandsgatan at Norrmalm in Stockholm. Nowadays, the Nordic finance group Nordea has its Swedish branch office in the building.
