= Nordbanken =

Former Swedish bank

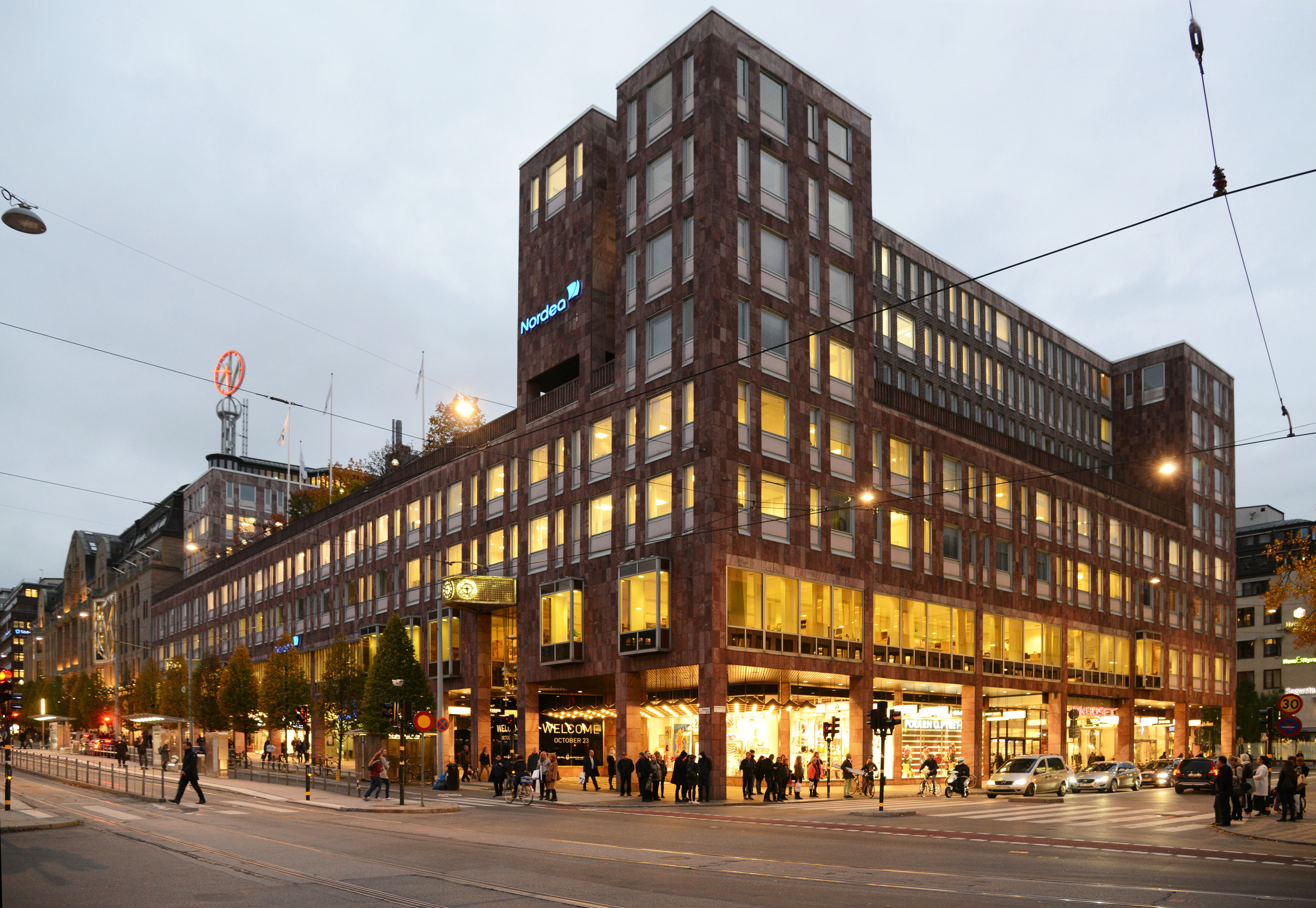
PK-Huset building in Stockholm, former head office of PKbanken (1974-1990) then Nordbanken (1990-1997)

Nordbanken was a bank in Sweden, established in 1986 by merger of private local banks. In 1990 it was taken over by PKbanken, which subsequently adopted Nordbanken as its own name. The merged bank ran into financial distress during the 1990–1994 Swedish financial crisis, was nationalized in 1992, and eventually merged in 1997 with Finland's Merita Bank to form MeritaNordbanken, rebranded Nordea in 2000.

== Overview ==
Nordbanken was formed in 1986 by a merger of two smaller private local banks, Uplandsbanken and Sundsvallsbanken. The oldest of the original Nordbanken constituent banks was Wermlandsbanken, which was founded in 1832. Nordbanken came under Swedish government control in 1992, following the Swedish banking crisis in the early 1990s, with the sale of its non-performing loans to the Swedish government and significant reduction in personnel. Bad debts were transferred to the asset-management company Securum, which sold off the assets.

Following the 1990 merger Nordbanken had its head office at PK-huset, a building completed in 1974 and previously headquarters of PKbanken. PK-huset later became the head office of Nordea until its relocation to Helsinki, decided in 2017 and effective on 1 October 2018.

== See also ==
- List of banks in Sweden
