= Nordea =

Nordic financial institution

Nordea Bank Abp

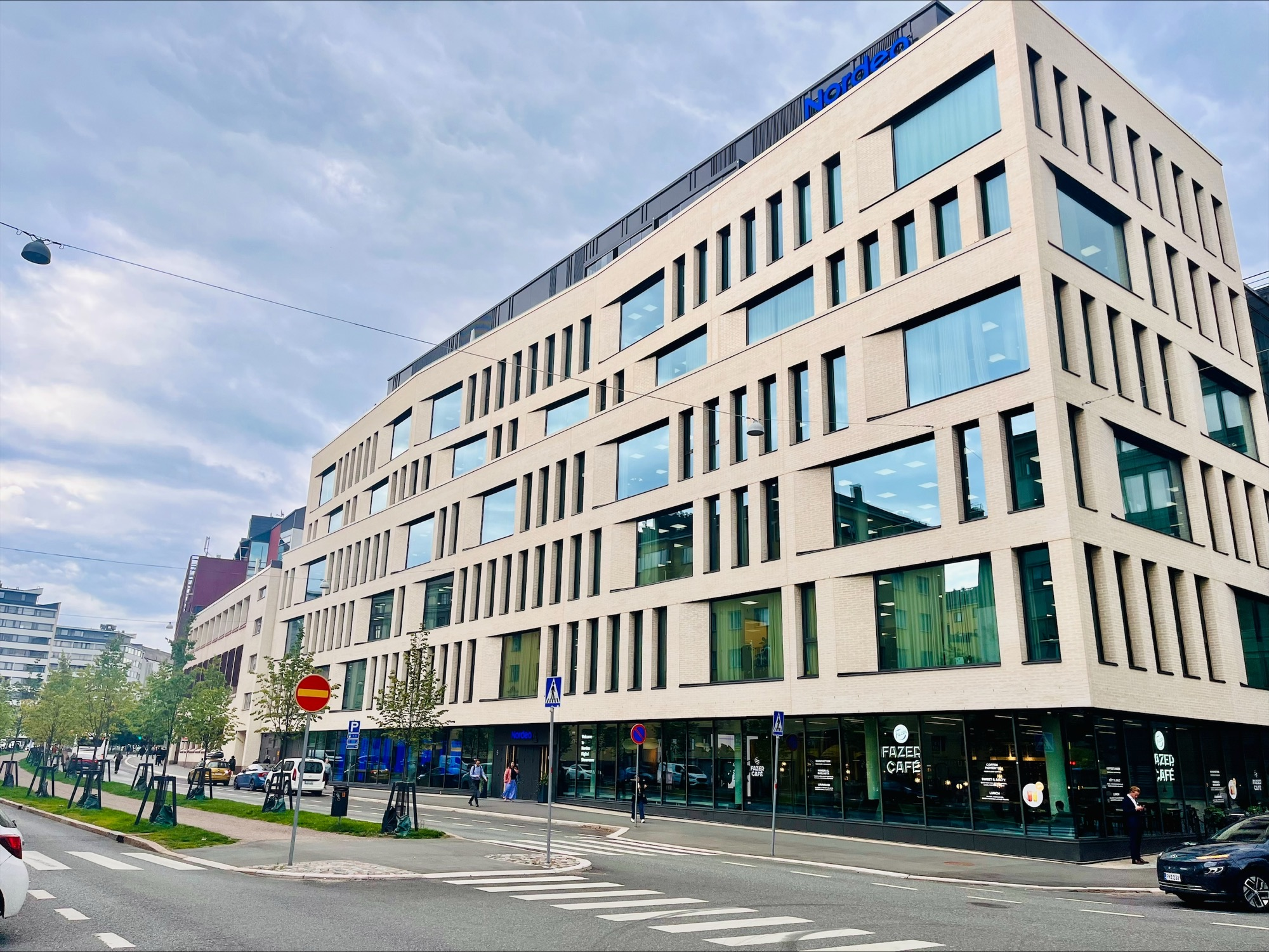
- The headquarters of Nordea is located in Vallila, Helsinki
- Native name: Nordea Bank Abp
- Formerly: Merita Bank, Unibank, Nordbanken, Kreditkassen
- Type: Public limited company (Publikt Aktiebolag)
- Traded as: Nasdaq Helsinki: NDA FI; Nasdaq Stockholm: NDA SE; Nasdaq Copenhagen: NDA DK; OMXS30 component
- ISIN: FI4000297767
- Industry: financial services financial sector
- Founded: 1820 as Sparekassen for Kjøbenhavn og Omegn
- Founder: Hans Dalborg
- Headquarters: Helsinki, Finland
- Key people: Stephen Hester (Chairman); Frank Vang-Jensen (President and CEO)
- Products: Corporate and retail banking, asset management
- Revenue: 11,743,000,000 euro (2025)
- Operating income: 6,316,000,000 (2025)
- Net income: 4,840,000,000 euro (2025)
- AUM: 478,100,000,000 euro (2025)
- Total assets: 654,350,000,000 euro (2025)
- Total equity: 32,419,000,000 euro (2025)
- Number of employees: 28,989 (2025)
- Capital ratio: 17.0%
- Rating: AA (Fitch Ratings)
- Website: www.nordea.com/en

Nordea old logo (2000–2016)

Nordea Bank Abp, commonly referred to as Nordea, is a Nordic financial services group operating in northern Europe with headquarters in Helsinki, Finland. The name is a blend of the words "Nordic" and "idea". The Nordic countries are considered Nordea's home market, following the sale of its Polish business in 2014, the divestment of its Baltic operations in 2019, and its exit from Russia in 2022. Nordea is listed on Nasdaq Nordic exchanges in Helsinki (its primary listing), Copenhagen, and Stockholm, while its American Depository Receipts are traded in the US.

Nordea serves 6.5 million household customers and more than 500,000 active corporate customers. Nordea's credit portfolio is distributed across Finland (20%), Denmark (23%), Norway (23%), and Sweden (34%). Operations are organized into four business areas: Personal Banking, Business Banking, Large Corporates & Institutions, and Asset & Wealth Management. Assets under Management (AUM) were €478 billion in December 2025.

Nordea has been designated as a Significant Institution since the entry into force of European Banking Supervision in late 2014, first as the Finnish arm of the Stockholm-based group and since 2017 as a financial holding company. As a consequence, it is directly supervised by the European Central Bank.

The company has been embroiled in numerous scandals involving money laundering and tax evasion. In 2024, Danish authorities indicted the bank for alleged violations of Denmark's anti-money laundering act relating to historical transactions between 2012 and 2015. The authorities described the case as the most extensive violation of the act in the country's history.

== History ==
Nordea was created from a series of mergers in the late 1990s involving major credit institutions in Denmark, Finland, Norway and Sweden. The roots of its predecessor entities go back to 1820 with Sparekassen for Kjøbenhavn og Omegn in Denmark (later Unibank), 1832 with Wermlandsbanken in Sweden (later Nordbanken), 1848 with Christiania Kreditkasse in Norway (later Christiania Bank), and 1862 with the Union Bank of Finland, known by its Finnish initials SYP (for Suomen Yhdyspankki).

=== Founding mergers 1995-2000 ===
The sequence of mergers started in 1995 when SYP merged with its decades-long domestic rival, Kansallis-Osake-Pankki (KOP), with the merged entity rebranded as Merita Bank. Merita Bank then merged with Nordbanken in 1997, rebranding again as MeritaNordbanken.

In early 2000, MeritaNordbanken announced its takeover of Unidanmark, by then Denmark's second-largest bank, creating the Nordic region's biggest financial institution with €186 billion in assets. The merged group had a banking market share of 20% in Sweden, 25% in Denmark and 40% in Finland and a combined workforce of 28,050. By end 2000, MeritaNordbanken had further merged with Christiania Bank og Kreditkasse of Norway, a process started in 1999 and changed its name to Nordea. Christiania Bank had also been impacted severely during the banking crisis in the early 1990s, with Nordea acquiring the bank from the Norwegian Government Bank Investment Fund with a 35% share.

=== Further development ===
The Solo internet-based banking operation of MeritaNordbanken was a global pioneer and leader providing mobile and internet banking access in 1999. The bank reached 1 million internet banking customers during 1999 with 3 million log-ins and 3.7 million payments per month. Housing loans via Solo were introduced in 1999.

Nordea expanded into Poland, the Baltics and Russia in the early 2000s, with 2% of total revenues from the Poland and Baltics region. Nordea divested its Polish banking operations in 2013, with the sale to PKO Bank Polski for €694 million but retains a presence in Poland via operations and IT units supporting the Nordic banks. By end 2014, lending in the Baltics was €8.2 billion and in Russia €4.5 billion. During the period 2013-2017 exposure to the Russian market was reduced by 63%.

In 2016, Luminor was formed by a merger of Nordea's and DNB's operations in Estonia, Latvia and Lithuania creating the third largest Baltic regional bank with assets of €15 billion and a market share of 16.4%. Luminor was sold to Blackstone, with Nordea and DNB retaining each initially a 20% share. However, the full divestment was completed in 2019. Exit from the Russian, Baltic and Polish markets were part of Nordea's de-risking strategy, which also included reduced exposures to some sectors (e.g. Shipping, Oil & Offshore and Agriculture in Denmark). Nordea was one of the Nordic banks, including Danske Bank, SEB and Swedbank, allegedly involved in the money laundering scandal, involving ex-Soviet states, that emerged in 2017.

=== 2017 relocation and aftermath ===
Nordea announced plans to move its corporate headquarters from Stockholm, Sweden to Helsinki, Finland in September 2017. Nordea cited the Swedish socialist government's unpredictable tax hikes as the primary reason for its decision to relocate. Nordea estimated that relocation would save the bank a billion euros. The re-domiciliation of Nordea to Finland put it within the supervision of the European Central Bank and within the European Union's banking union. In October 2018, Nordea completed the move of its corporate headquarters to Helsinki, Finland.

=== Historical performance, ratios and key figures ===
Historical performance, ratios and key figures for Nordea 1999–2025
Year	Share Price (€, year-end)	Total Assets (€ billion)	Return on Equity (%)	Tier 1 Capital Ratio (%)	Common Equity Tier 1 capital ratio (%), excluding Basel 1 floor
1999	5.84	186	18.0	9.0	
2000	8.10	224	16.1	6.8	
2001	5.97	242	13.8	7.3	
2002	4.20	250	7.5	7.1	
2003	5.95	262	12.3	7.3	
2004	7.43	276	15.7	7.3	
2005	8.79	326	18.0	6.8	
2006	11.67	347	22.9	7.1	
2007	11.42	389	19.7	7.0	7.5
2008	5.00	474	15.3	7.4	8.5
2009	7.10	508	11.3	10.2	10.3
2010	8.16	580	11.5	9.8	10.3
2011	5.98	716	11.1	10.1	11.2
2012	7.24	677	11.6	11.2	13.1
2013	9.78	630	11.0		14.9
2014	9.68	669	11.5		15.7
2015	10.15	647	12.2		16.5
2016	10.60	616	12.3		18.4
2017	10.09	582	9.5		19.5
2018	7.27	551	9.7		15.5
2019	7.24	555	5.0		16.4
2020	6.67	552	7.1		17.1
2021	10.79	570	11.2		17.1
2022	10.03	595	11.8		16.4
2023	11.23	585	16.9		17.0
2024	10.50	623	16.7		15.8
2025	16.09	654	15.5		15.7

== Performance and ownership ==
Nordea's market capitalization was €55.2 billion at the end of 2025, making it the fifth largest company in the Nordic region and among the 15 largest European financial services groups. Between 2000 – when Nordea was formed by the merger of MeritaNordbanken and Unidanmark – and 2025, the share price of Nordea appreciated by 297%, clearly outperforming the STOXX Europe 600 Banks Index (+6%).

As of December 2025, Nordea's 10 largest shareholders were:

1. BlackRock, 5.5%
2. Norges Bank, 5.0%
3. The Vanguard Group, 4.4%
4. Nordea-fonden, 4.1%
5. Cevian Capital, 3.6%
6. Swedbank Robur Funds, 2.0%
7. SEB Funds, 1.4%
8. Alecta Tjänstepension, 1.4%
9. Amundi, 1.2%
10. Varma Mutual Pension Insurance Company, 1.2%

== Business areas ==
Nordea has four business areas: Personal Banking, Business Banking, Large Corporates & Institutions, and Asset & Wealth Management.

== Scandals ==
Nordea was the subject of an online phishing scam in 2007. The company estimated 8 million kr ($1.1 million) was stolen. Customers were targeted over a period of 15 months with phishing emails containing a trojan horse. Nordea refunded affected customers.

The largest financial group in the Nordic region, Nordea was, despite warnings from the Swedish Financial Supervisory Authority (FI) active in using offshore companies in tax havens according to the Panama papers. Other Swedish banks were mentioned in the documents, but mention of Nordea occurred 10,902 times and the second-most mentioned bank has 764 matches. In 2012, Nordea asked Mossack Fonseca to change documents retroactively so that three Danish customers power of attorney documents had been in force since 2010. Nordea bank loaned billions of euros to shipping companies that own vessels in secrecy jurisdictions such as Bermuda, Cyprus, Panama, BVI, the Cayman Islands and the Isle of Man. In the Paradise Papers, Nordea was shown to have lent a significant amount of money to customers based in tax havens. As a consequence of the leaked documents, the Swedish Financial Supervisory Authority (FI) stated on 4 April 2016 that it had started an investigation into the conduct of Nordea.

The Nordea section in Luxembourg, between the years 2004 and 2014, founded nearly 400 offshore companies in Panama and the British Virgin Islands for its customers. The Swedish Financial Supervisory Authority (FI) pointed out that there are "serious deficiencies" in how Nordea monitors money laundering, and gave the bank two warnings. In 2015, Nordea paid the largest possible fine - over 5 million EUR. Stefan Löfven, Prime Minister of Sweden, said in 2016 that he was very critical of the conduct of Nordea and its role, and said: "They are on the list of shame too". The Swedish minister of Finance Magdalena Andersson characterized the conduct of Nordea as "a crime" and "totally unacceptable". The director for Nordea Private banking Thorben Sanders admits that before 2009 they did not screen for customers that tried to evade tax. "At the end of 2009 we decided that our bank should not be a means of tax evasion" says Thorben Sanders. Nordea CEO Casper von Koskull stated that he was disappointed with the shortcomings within Nordea's operating principles, saying that "this cannot be tolerated".

In 2013, Politiken, a Danish newspaper, revealed that Nordea's Copenhagen branch was instrumental in establishing approximately 100 offshore companies for Russian and other nationals, despite warnings about suspicious activities. In 2024, the Danish authorities indicted Nordea for violating anti-money laundering laws by allowing $3.7 billion of suspicious transactions by the Russian clients. According to the Danish authorities, it was most extensive moneylaundering ever committed by a financial company in the country.

In March 2019, public service broadcasting company, Yle, aired a program that revealed money laundering allegations against Nordea. The company was the biggest Nordic lender allegedly involved in the multi-million-dollar money laundering scheme, according to Bloomberg.

In July 2024, Nordea Bank was taken to court in Denmark over allegations of failing to prevent money laundering linked to Russian clients. The charges stem from transactions worth €3.8 billion, where Nordea is accused of neglecting proper oversight and ignoring red flags. Despite setting aside €95 million for potential fines, the actual penalty could be significantly higher, possibly approaching $1 billion.

In August 2024, Nordea agreed to pay $35 million to settle a money-laundering investigation by the New York State Department of Financial Services, linked to the Panama Papers scandal. The probe revealed the bank's failure to prevent illegal activities, including inadequate screening of clients from 2008 to 2019.

== Subsidiaries ==
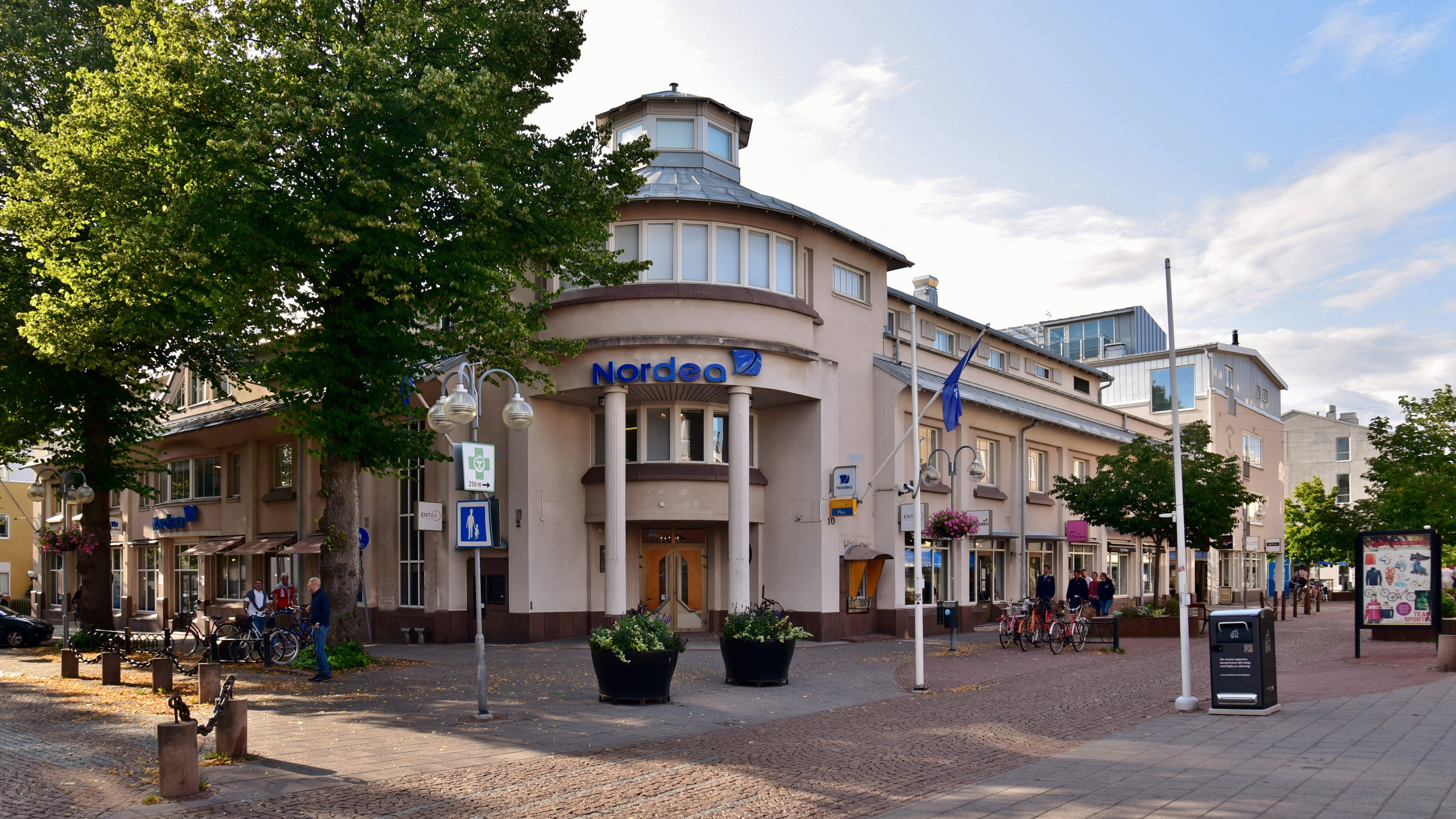
Nordea's office in Mariehamn, Åland

Following a major structural reorganisation, Nordea consolidated its Nordic operations into branches of the parent company. The following is a list of former subsidiaries and other historical entities.

Nordea Bank Abp (Finland) – headquartered in Helsinki

=== Former Subsidiaries (now branches of Nordea Bank Abp) ===
- Denmark – formerly Nordea Bank Danmark A/S
- Norway – formerly Nordea Bank Norge ASA
- Sweden – formerly Nordea Bank AB

=== Divested or Closed Entities ===
- Nordea Bank Polska S.A. (Sold in 2013)
- Nordea Bank Latvia (Sold in 2017)
- Nordea Bank Lithuania (Sold in 2017)
- Nordea Bank Russia (closed in 2021)

== Nordic headquarters ==
Nordea inherited multiple iconic buildings from its many predecessor entities, some of which it has sold for development.

Nordea initially kept its registered office for Finland in the former seat of Yhdyspankki, completed 1898 in the Kluuvi neighborhood of Helsinki. Starting in 2000, it started developing a more modern headquarters complex in the Vallila neighborhood, branded Nordea Campus. In 2016, Nordea moved the registered address of Nordea Finland to the Nordea Campus, which became the head office address for the entire Nordea Group the following year. By 2025, the Nordea Campus had grown to 12,400 square meters, offering workspace for over 4,500 employees. The former Yhdyspankki building was subsequently repurposed as Nordea Bank Museum.

In Oslo, the current Nordea head office was created in 2015 by remodeling of existing buildings erected in 1998 on a design by architect Niels A. Torp.

In 2017, Nordea inaugurated a new head office complex in Copenhagen, designed by architect Henning Larsen. Larsen had already designed the previous head office of Nordea Denmark, in the Christianshavn neighborhood of Copenhagen, completed in 2000.

Stockholm is the only one of the four Nordic capitals where Nordea is still based in the former head office of a predecessor entity, namely PK-huset, originally completed in 1974 and the former headquarters of PKbanken (1974-1990) then of Nordbanken (1990-2000).

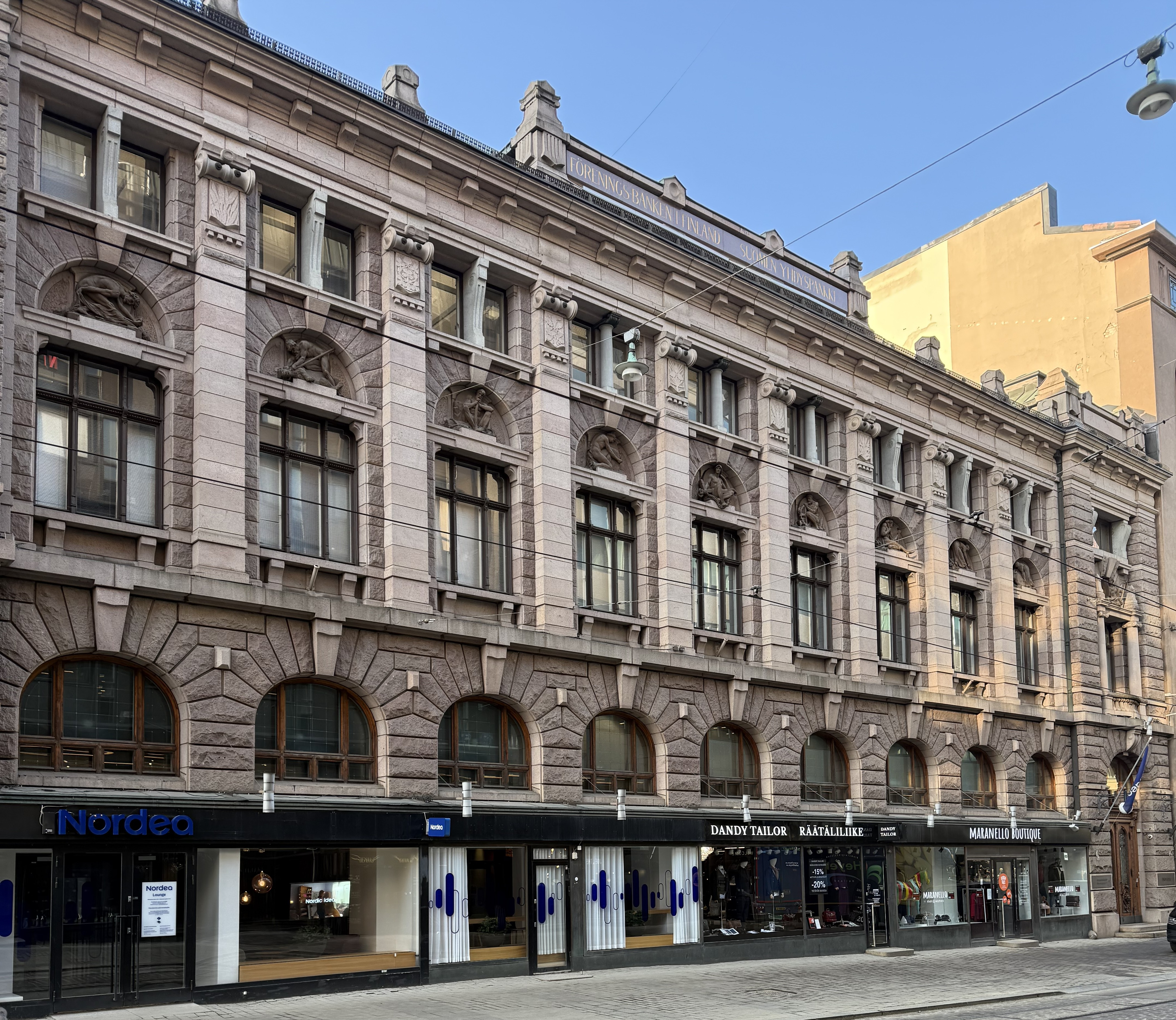
Former registered office in Helsinki, lately Nordea Bank Museum

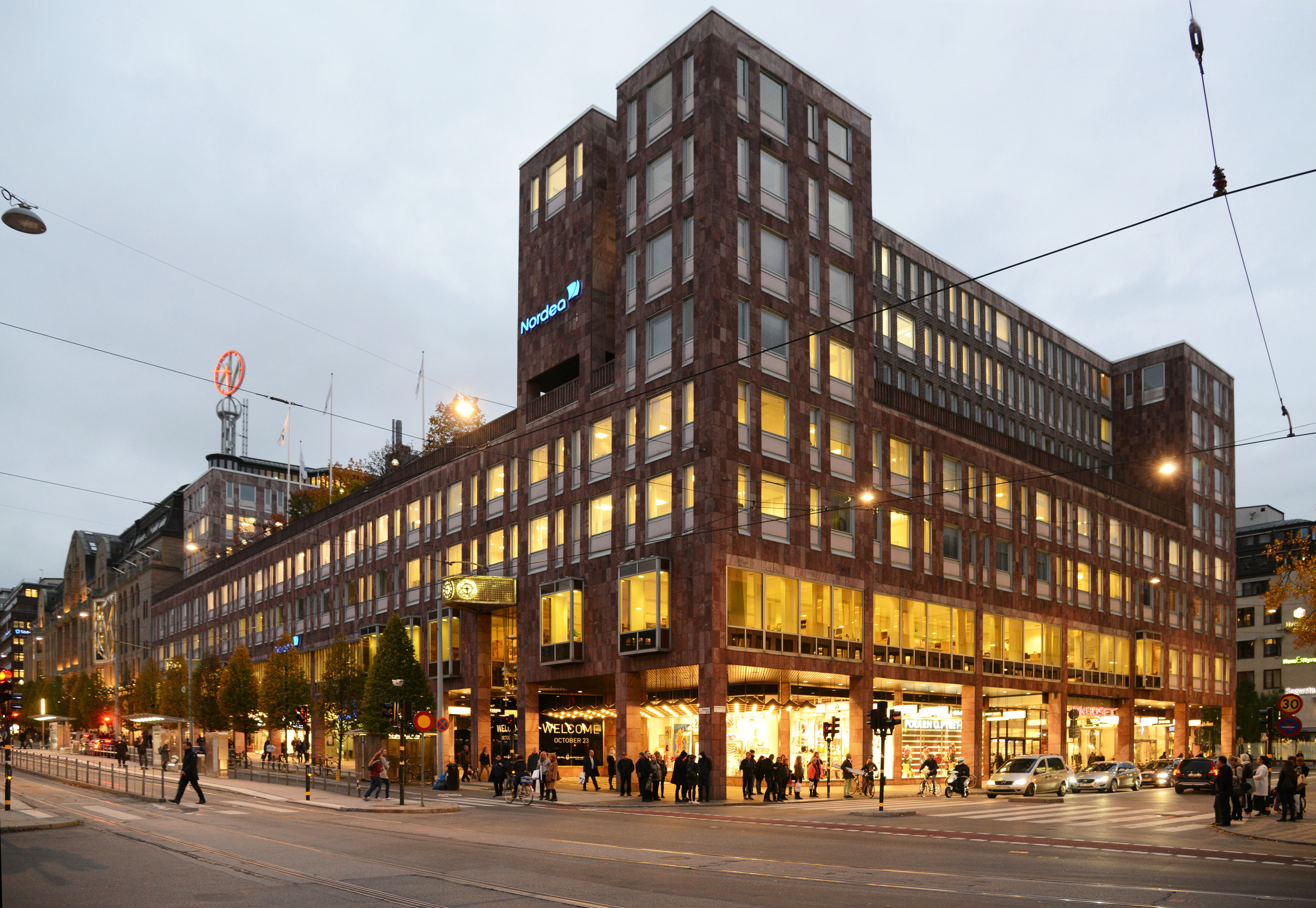
PK-huset, Swedish headquarters in Stockholm

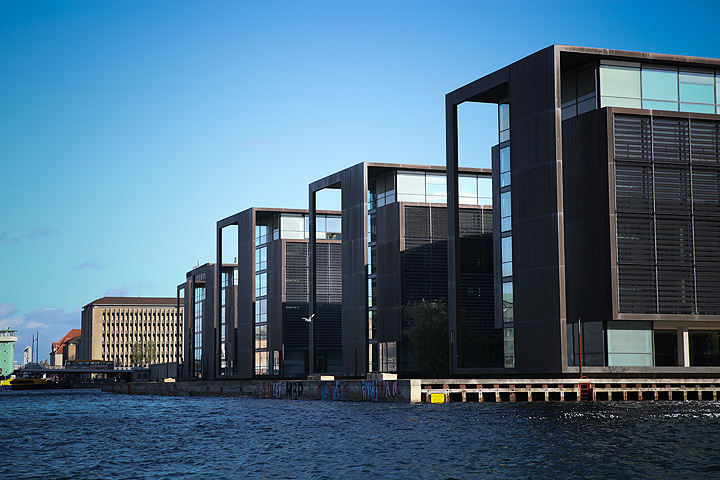
Danish headquarters in Copenhagen from 2000 to 2017

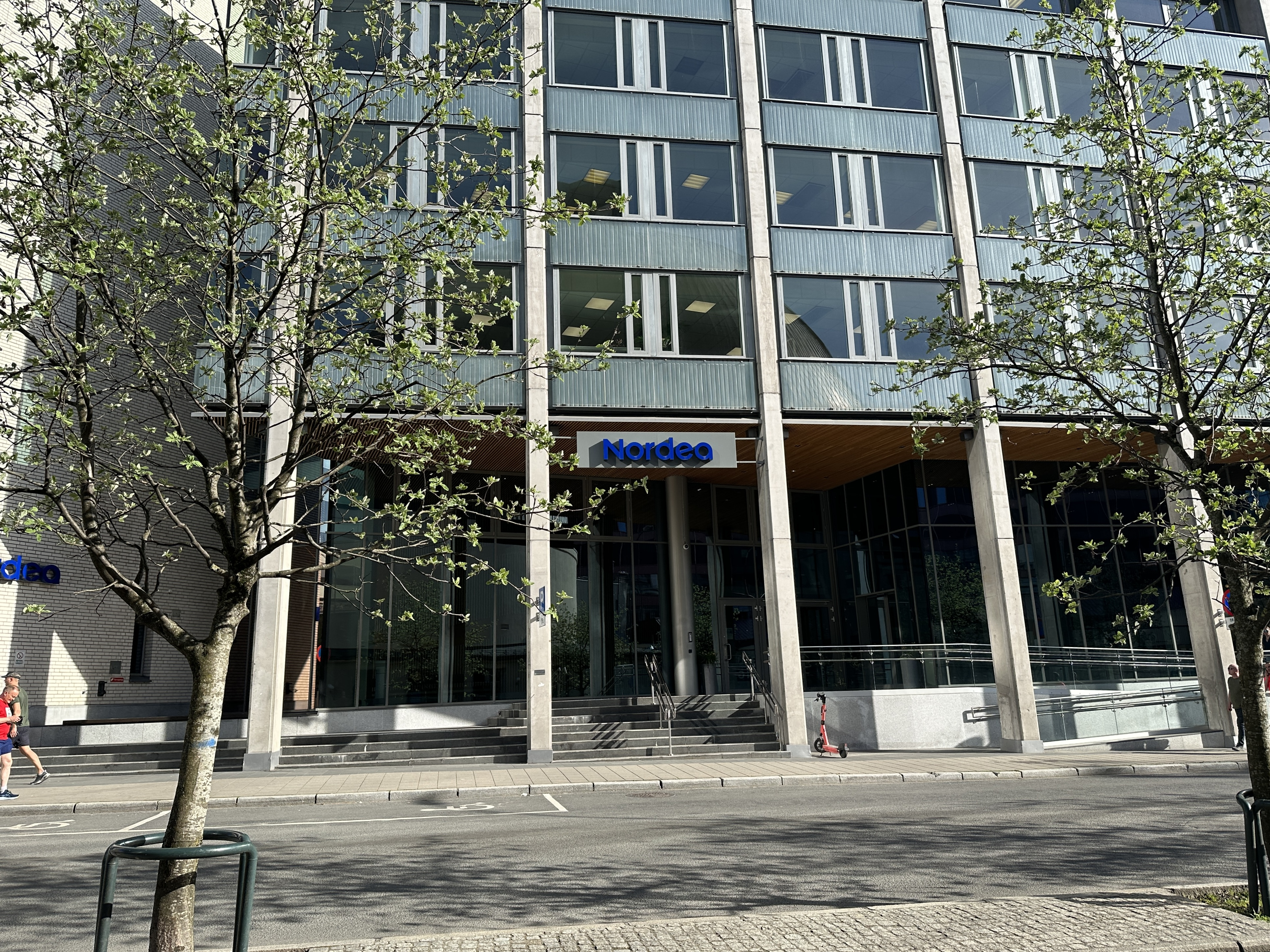
Norwegian headquarters in Oslo

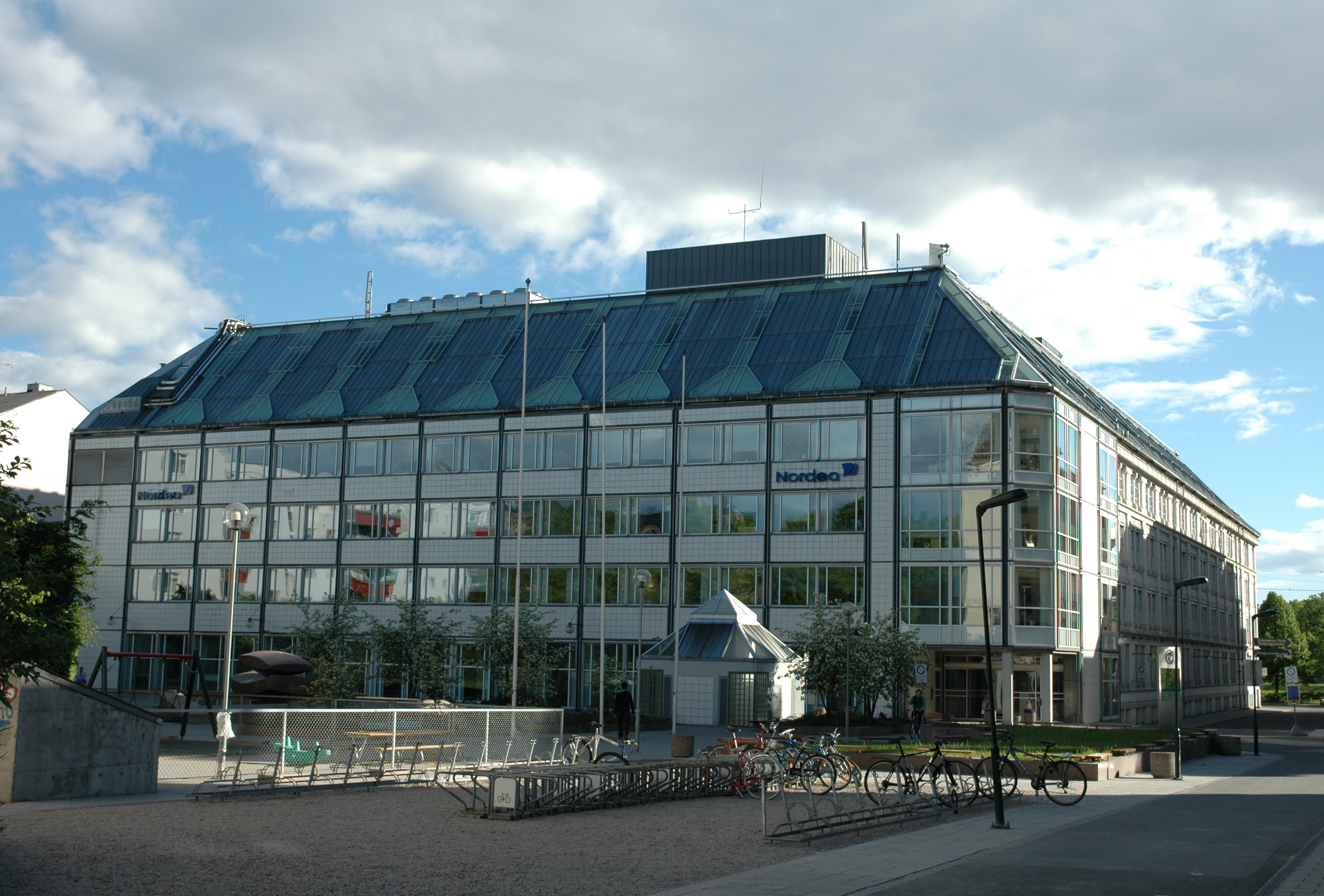
Former Norwegian headquarters before mid-2010s relocation

== See also ==
- PlusGirot – open clearing system in Sweden owned by Nordea
- Inter-Alpha Group of Banks
- Kansallis-Osake-Pankki
- List of oldest companies, as Nordea is the oldest bank in Sweden, with roots from 1820.
- List of investors in Bernard L. Madoff Securities
- List of banks in the euro area
- List of banks in Finland
- List of banks in Sweden
- List of banks in Denmark
