= List of banks in Finland =

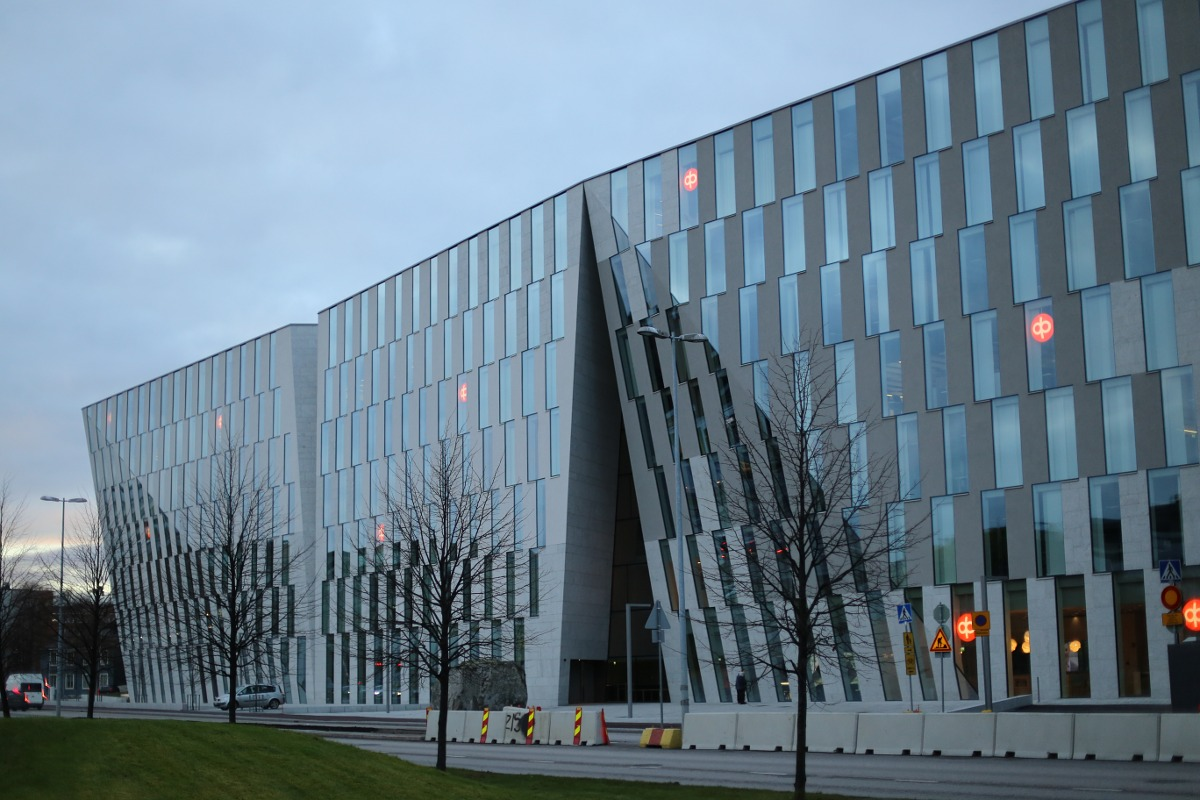
OP Group Head office, Helsinki

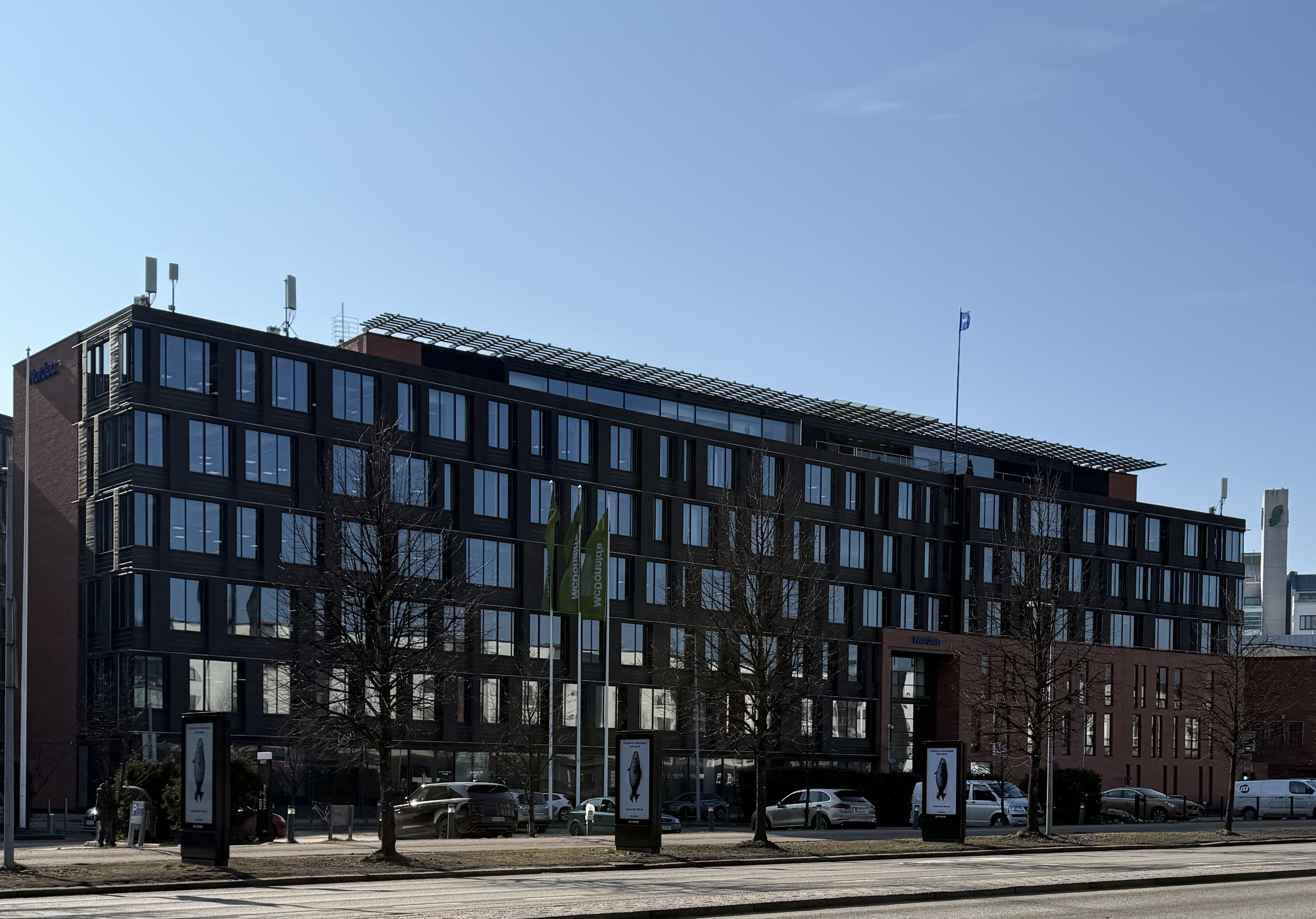
Nordea head office, Helsinki

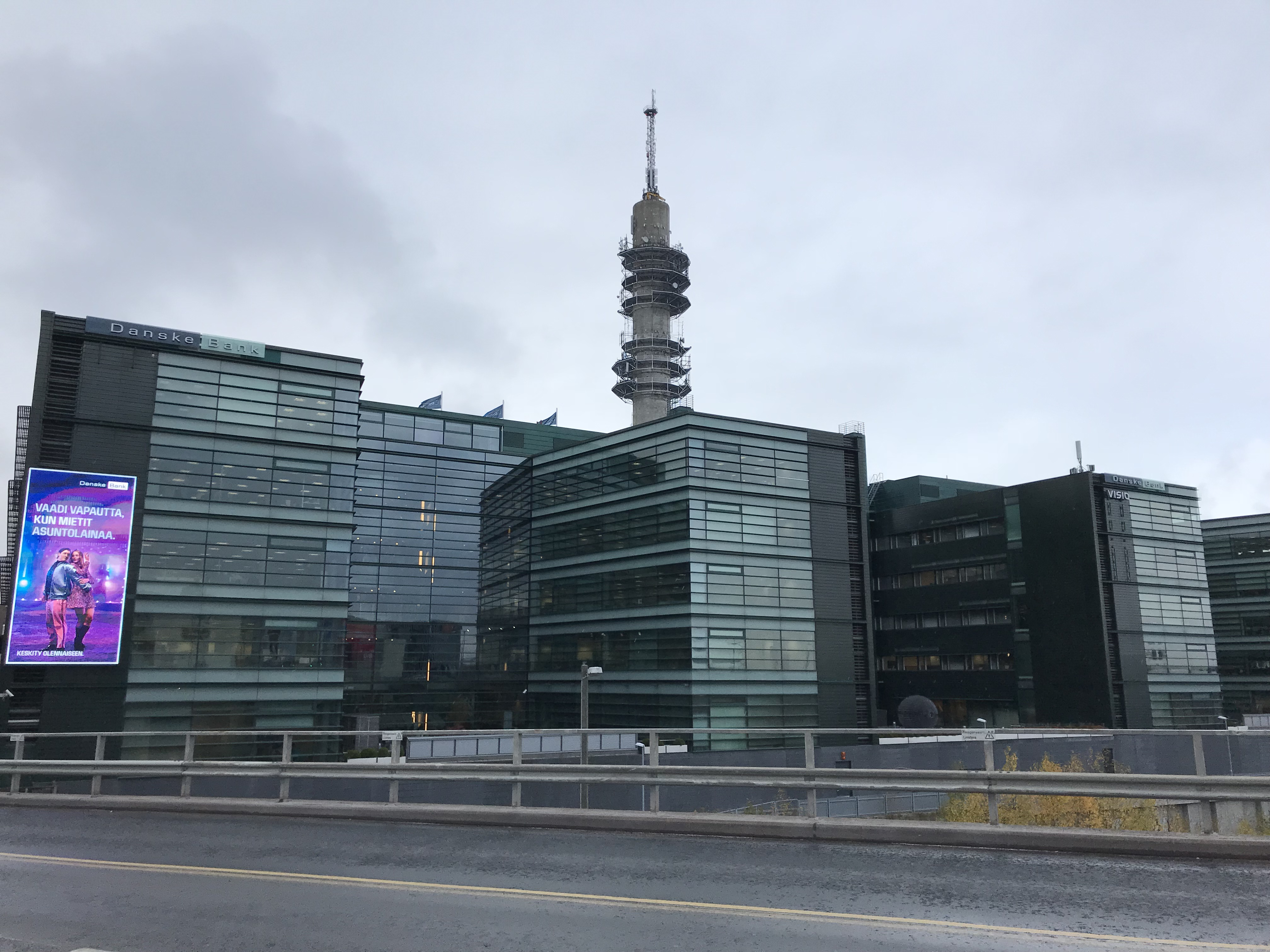
Danske Bank Finnish branch, Helsinki

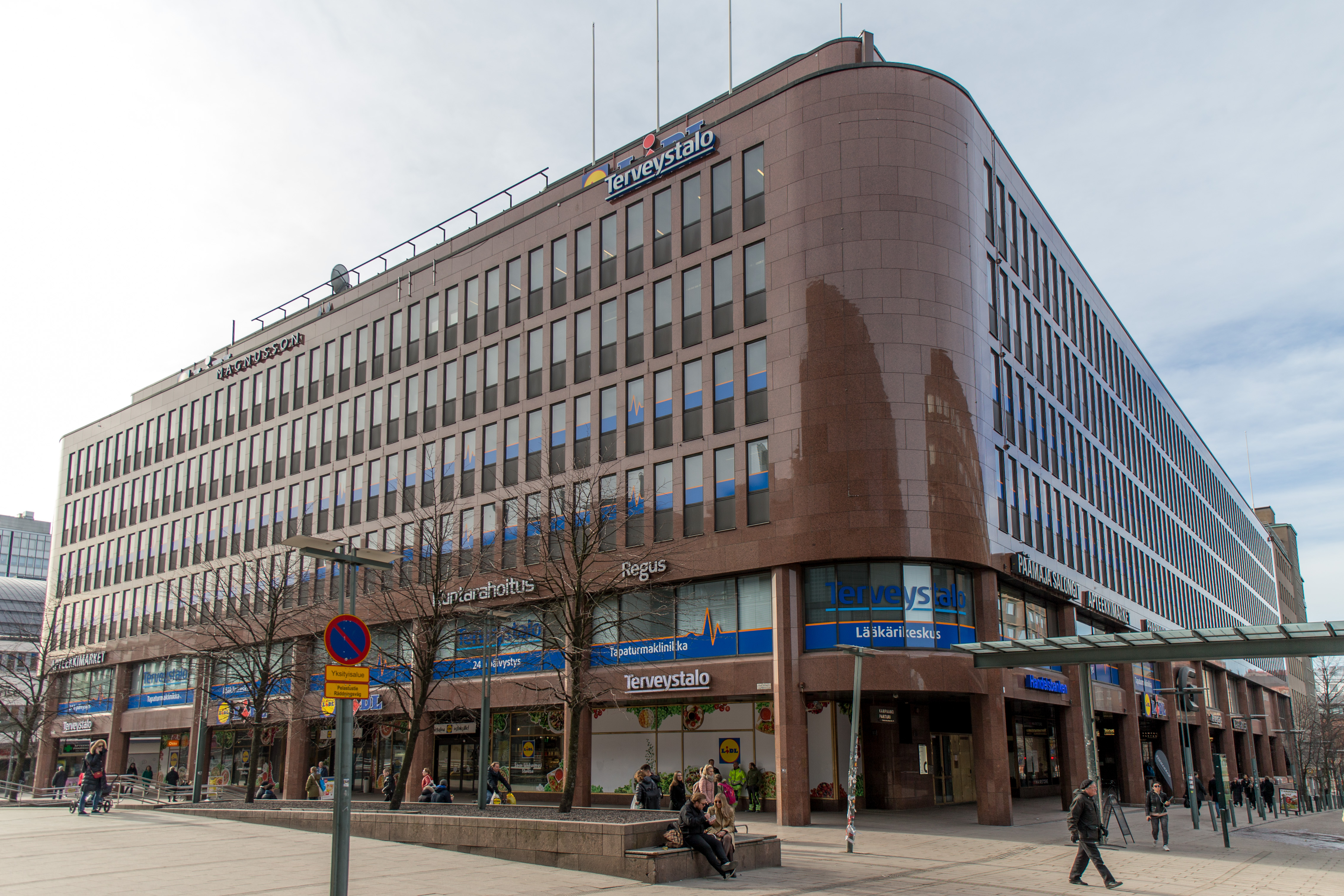
Building hosting the head office of Kuntarahoitus, Helsinki

The following list of banks in Finland is to be understood within the framework of the European single market and European banking union, which means that Finland's banking system is more open to cross-border banking operations than peers outside of the EU. Finland's banking sector is also highly digitalized, with widespread adoption of online banking and mobile financial services across both domestic and foreign banking institutions.

== Policy framework ==
European banking supervision distinguishes between significant institutions (SIs) and less significant institutions (LSIs), with SI/LSI designations updated regularly by the European Central Bank (ECB). Significant institutions are directly supervised by the ECB using joint supervisory teams that involve the national competent authorities (NCAs) of individual participating countries. Less significant institutions are supervised by the relevant NCA on a day-to-day basis, under the supervisory oversight of the ECB. In Finland's case, the NCA is the Finnish Financial Supervisory Authority.

== Significant institutions ==
As of 1 September 2025, the ECB had four Finnish banking groups in its list of significant institutions:

- the Finnish branch of Danske Bank
- Kuntarahoitus, a public bank
- Nordea
- OP Financial Group, a cooperative banking group

A study published in 2024 assessed that of these, OP had the largest volume of assets in Finland (€160 billion at end-2023), followed by Nordea (€137 billion), then Danske Bank (€50.6 billion) and Kuntarahoitus (€49.7 billion). Among SIs based in other euro area countries, Rabobank also operates in Finland via a subsidiary.

== Less significant institutions ==
As of 1 September 2025, the ECB's list of supervised institutions included 68 Finnish LSIs, three of which were designated by the ECB as "high-impact" on the basis of several criteria including size:

- Aktia Bank, originally a savings bank established in 1825
- Säästöpankkiliitto, central cooperative of the Finnish Savings Banks Group (see also below)
- S-Pankki Oy, a cooperative bank

The other 65 Finnish SIs divided into four groups, as follows.

=== Savings Banks Group ===
In addition to the above-mentioned Säästöpankkiliitto, the ECB's list of 1 September 2025 included the Säästöpankkien Keskuspankki, the SP Mortgage Bank (SP-Kiinnitysluottopankki Oyj), and the following 14 local entities of the Savings Banks Group:

- Aito Säästöpankki
- Avain Säästöpankki
- Helmi Säästöpankki Oy
- Kvevlax Sparbank
- Lammin Säästöpankki
- Länsi-Uudenmaan Säästöpankki
- Myrskylän Säästöpankki
- Säästöpankki Helsinki
- Närpes Sparbank
- Someron Säästöpankki
- Säästöpankki Kalanti-Pyhäranta
- Säästöpankki Optia Oy
- Säästöpankki Sinetti
- Ekenäs Sparbank

=== Cooperative banks ===
The same ECB list included 21 member LSIs of the POP Bank Group, namely three central entities (the central cooperative POP Pankkikeskus osk, group bank Bonum Pankki, and mortgage bank POP Asuntoluottopankki Oyj) plus 18 local cooperative banks:

- Honkajoen Osuuspankki
- Isojoen Osuuspankki
- Kannonkosken Osuuspankki
- Hetki Osuuspankki
- Konneveden Osuuspankki
- Kosken Osuuspankki
- Kurikan Osuuspankki
- Kyrön Seudun Osuuspankki
- Kyyjärven Osuuspankki
- Lammin Osuuspankki
- Lanneveden Osuuspankki
- Lappajärven Osuuspankki
- Lakeuden Osuuspankki
- Lavian Osuuspankki
- Nivalan Järvikylän Osuuspankki
- Pohjanmaan Osuuspankki
- Järvi-Suomen Osuuspankki
- Suupohjan (Suomen) Osuuspankki

=== Other Finnish LSIs ===
- Ålandsbanken
- Alisa Pankki
- Danske Kiinnitysluottopankki Oyj
- Oma Savings Bank
- Suomen Asuntohypopankki
- Suomen Hypoteekkiyhdistys

=== Foreign branches ===
22 Finnish LSIs in the list were branches of banks based in the European Economic Area (EEA), mostly of Swedish entities:

- (Sweden) Finnish branch of Avida Bank AB
- (Sweden) Finnish branch of Brocc Finance AB
- (Sweden) Finnish branch of Norion Bank AB
- (Norway) Finnish branch of DNB Bank ASA
  - Finnish branch of DNB Carnegie Investment Bank AB
- (Sweden) Finnish branch of Enity Bank Group AB
- (Sweden) Finnish branch of Ikano Bank AB
- (Sweden) Finnish branch of Nordnet Bank AB
- (Sweden) Finnish branch of Northmill Bank AB
- (Sweden) Finnish branch of Resurs Bank AB
- (Denmark) Finnish branch of Saxo Bank A/S
- (Sweden) Finnish branch of Skandinaviska Enskilda Banken AB
  - Finnish branch of SEB Kort AB
- (Sweden) Finnish branch of Svea Bank
- (Sweden) Finnish branch of Svenska Handelsbanken AB
  - Finnish branch of Stadshypotek, subsidiary by Handelsbanken
- (Sweden) Finnish branch of Swedbank AB
- (Sweden) Finnish branch of Telia Finance, financial arm of Telia Company
- (Sweden) Finnish branch of Avarda Bank
  - Finnish branch of TF Bank Nordic AB, a Swedish subsidiary of Avarda Bank AB

As of October 2025, there were no branches of banks located outside the EEA ("third-country branches" in EU parlance) in Finland, based on data compiled by the European Banking Authority.

== Other institutions ==
The Bank of Finland, Finnfund and Finnvera are public credit institutions that do not hold a banking license under EU law. Neither does the Nordic Investment Bank, a multilateral financial institution based in Helsinki.

== Defunct banks ==
Several former Finnish banks, defined as having been headquartered in the present-day territory of Finland, are documented on Wikipedia. They are listed below in chronological order of establishment. Finland experienced two waves of intense banking sector restructuring, first in the wake of independence and civil war in the late 1910s and 1920s with an aftershock during the European banking crisis of 1931, and second during the 1990s Finnish banking crisis.

- Turku Discount Bank (1805-1812), liquidated in the wake of the Finnish War
- Turku Savings Bank (1822-1992), merged into Suomen Säästöpankki (SSP)
- Helsinki Savings Bank (1825-1991), merged into Aktia Bank
- Päijät-Häme Savings Bank (1848-1992), merged into SSP
- Deposita Savings Bank (1856-1992), merged into SSP
- Suomen Yhdyspankki (1862-1995, rebranded as Pohjoismaiden Yhdyspankki / PYP from 1919 to 1975), merged into Merita Bank
- Lohja Savings Bank (1870-1988), merged into Länsi-Uudenmaan Säästöpankki
- Pohjoismaiden Osakepankki (1873-1919), merged into PYP
- Siuntio Savings Bank (1876-1991), merged into Aktia Bank
- Vaasan Osake-Pankki (1879-1920), merged into Liittopankki
- Postipankki (1887-1997), rebranded as Leonia Bank then Sampo Bank then absorbed by Danske Bank
- Uudenmaan Osakepankki (1887-1918), absorbed by Helsingin Osakepankki (HOP)
- Helsinki People's Bank (1889-1896), reorganized into Privatbanken i Helsingfors
- Kansallis-Osake-Pankki (1889-1995), merged into Merita Bank
- Finnish Cities Mortgage Bank (1895-1922), liquidated
- Privatbanken i Helsingfors (1896-1922), absorbed by PYP
- Savo-Karelia Joint-Stock Bank (1896-1940), liquidated in the wake of the Winter War
- Turun Osakepankki (1896-1920), merged into Liittopankki
- Agricultural and Industrial Bank of Finland (1897-1902), liquidated
- Tampereen Osake-Pankki (1898-1929), merged into Maakuntain Pankki
- Nykarleby Aktiebank (1899-1913), liquidated
- Nisula Cooperative Bank (1903-?)
- Finnish Savings Bank of Turku (1904-1992), merged into SSP
- Virkkala Savings Bank (1905-1988), merged into Länsi-Uudenmaan Säästöpankki
- Suomen Kauppapankki (1907-1924), absorbed by HOP
- Finnish Real Estate Bank (1907-1996), absorbed into Säästöpankkien Keskus-Osake-Pankki (SKOP)
- Säästöpankkien Keskus-Osake-Pankki (SKOP, 1908-1995), liquidated
- Landtmannabanken (1909-1920), merged into Liittopankki
- Länsi-Suomen Osake-Pankki (1912-1929), merged into Maakuntain Pankki
- Helsingin Osakepankki (HOP, 1913-1985), acquired by Suomen Yhdyspankki
- Häme Workers' Savings Bank (1914-1970), merged into Suomen Työväen Säästöpankki (STS)
- Finnish Agricultural Joint-Stock Bank (1916-1958), absorbed by Kansallis-Osake-Pankki (KOP)
- Liikepankki Oy (1916-1924), merged into Turunmaan Pankki
- Land Real Estate Bank (1916-2000), merged into OKO Bank
- Pohjolan Osake-Pankki (1916-1948), absorbed by KOP
- Brändö-Hertonäs Fastighetsbank (1917-1931), liquidated
- Etelä-Suomen Pankki (1917-1927), merged into Liittopankki
- Finnish Craftsmen Joint-Stock Bank (1917-1945), merged into PYP
- Helsinki Discount Bank (1917-1921), liquidated
- Luotto-Pankki (1917-1933), absorbed by KOP
- Export Bank of Finland (1918-1931), liquidated
- Industrial Bank of Finland (1918-1922), absorbed by HOP
- Maakuntain Keskus-Pankki (1918-1928), merged into Maakuntain Pankki
- Atlas Pankki (1919-1929), absorbed by HOP
- Joint-Stock Bank for Foreign Trade (1920-1924), liquidated
- Liittopankki (1920-1931), absorbed by HOP
- Bank of Turku (1924-1933), liquidated
- Industrial Bank of Finland (1924-1998), absorbed by Merita Bank
- Svenska Finlands Lantmannabank (1924-1933), liquidated
- Bank of South Ostrobothnia (1929-1931), liquidated
- Maakuntain Pankki (1929-1932), absorbed by KOP
- Oulu Workers' Savings Bank (1932-1970), merged into STS
- Suur-Helsingin Osuuspankki (SHOP, 1946-1996), merged into Okopankki, part of OP
- Osuuspankki Yhteistuki (1963-1993), merged into SHOP
- Peruspankki (1963-1990), merged into STS
- Suomen Työväen Säästöpankki (STS, 1971-1992), absorbed by KOP
- Tapiola Group (1982-2013), absorbed by S-Bank
- Evli Oyj (1985-2024), reorganized as Alisa Pankki
- Interbank Osakepankki (1988-1998), merged into Mandatum Bank
- Savings Bank of Finland (STS, 1992-1993), dismantled
- Merita Bank (1995-1997), merged into MeritaNordbanken
- Trevise Bank (1996-2000), absorbed by Nordea
- MeritaNordbanken (1997-2000), rebranded as Nordea
- Mandatum Bank (1998-2001), absorbed by Sampo Bank
- Eufex (2000-2014), absorbed by EAB Group
- Sofia Pankki (2008-2010), liquidated

== See also ==
- List of banks in Åland
- List of banks in the euro area
- List of banks in Europe
