= Wasa-Aktie-Bank Building =

Historic bank building in Finland

- Wasa Aktiebankin talo
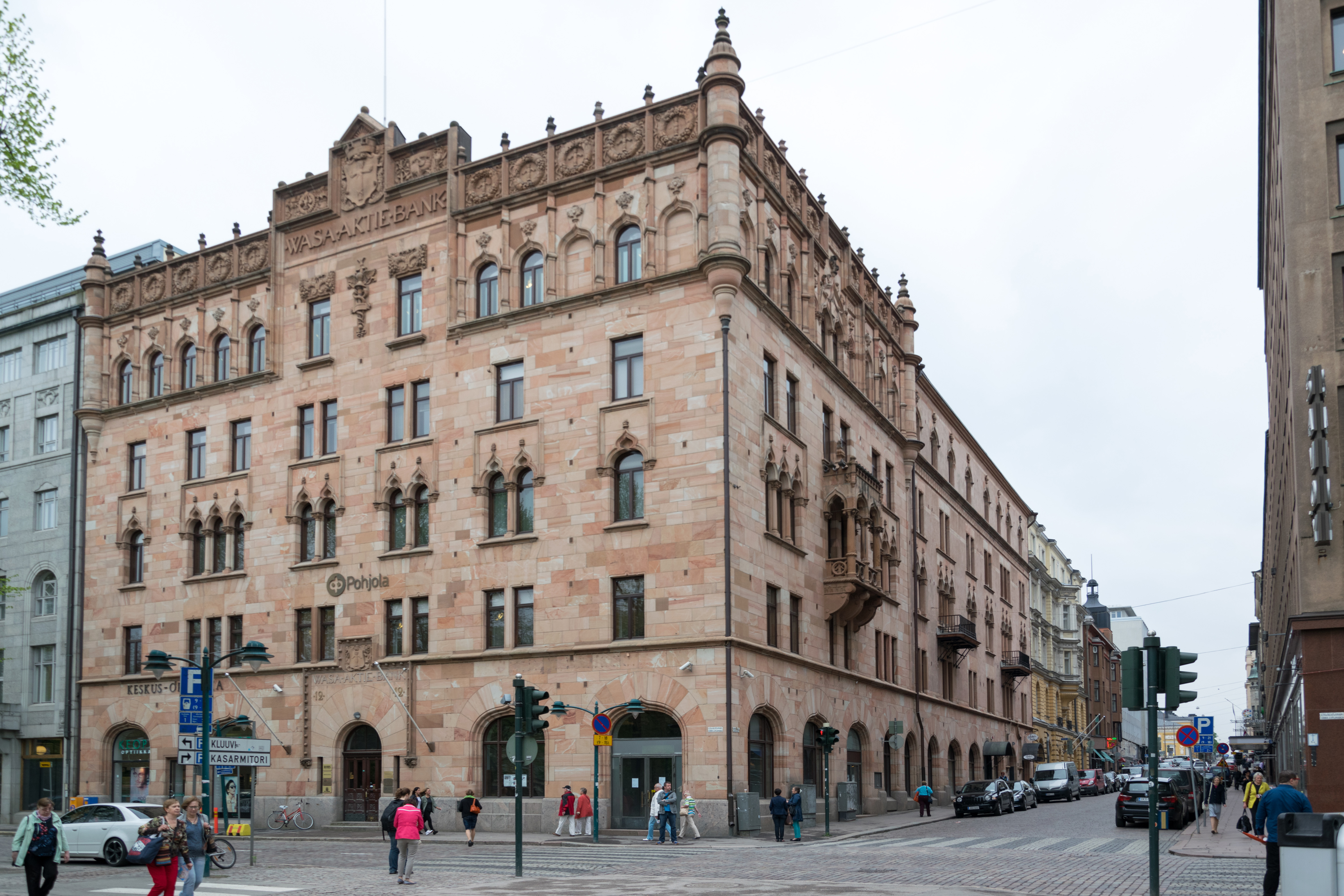
- Interactive map of the Wasa-Aktie-Bank Building area

General information
- Type: Offices, apartments (original)
- Architectural style: Gothic revival
- Location: Helsinki, Uusimaa, Finland
- Coordinates: 60°10′1″N 24°56′52″E
- Construction started: 1898
- Completed: 1899
- Client: Wasa-Aktie-Bank

Technical details
- Structural system: masonry

Design and construction
- Architects: John Settergran for Grahn, Hedman & Wasastjerna

The Wasa-Aktie-Bank Building is an office building located at the corner of Eteläesplanadi and Kasarmikatu (Eteläesplanadi 12/Kasarmikatu 27) in the Kaartinkaupunki district of central Helsinki, Uusimaa, Finland. It was originally built by Wasa-Aktie-Bank as its own office in 1898–99 and designed by Swedish-born architect John Settergren, then working for Grahn, Hedman & Wasastjerna, while Finland was still a Grand Duchy, territorially a part of the Czarist Russian Empire. The building is still used as a bank today, as the offices of Pohjola Varainhoito and the Royal Bank of Scotland.

The architecture of the Wasa-Aktie-Bank Building has a Gothic flavor, inspired by the Renaissance palaces of Venice and Spain. A more direct model is the Hallwyl Palace in the center of Stockholm, designed by Isak Gustaf Clason and built from 1893 to 1898. The facade material used is Orsa sandstone, which was imported from Sweden's Taalainmaa. The coat of arms of Vaasa, referring to Wasa-Aktie-Bank's hometown, is carved into the upper part of the facade on the south (Esplanade) side. Originally, only the first floor of the building was used for offices and the other floors had luxurious apartments.

In 1920, Wasa-Aktie-Bank merged into Suomen Liittopankki and later into Helsingin Osakepankki (HOP). The interior of the building was renovated several times between the 1930s and 1970s, when the apartments were converted to offices. After HOP, Svenska Handelsbanken's office has operated in the building, among others.
