= Helsingin Osakepankki =

Former Finnish bank

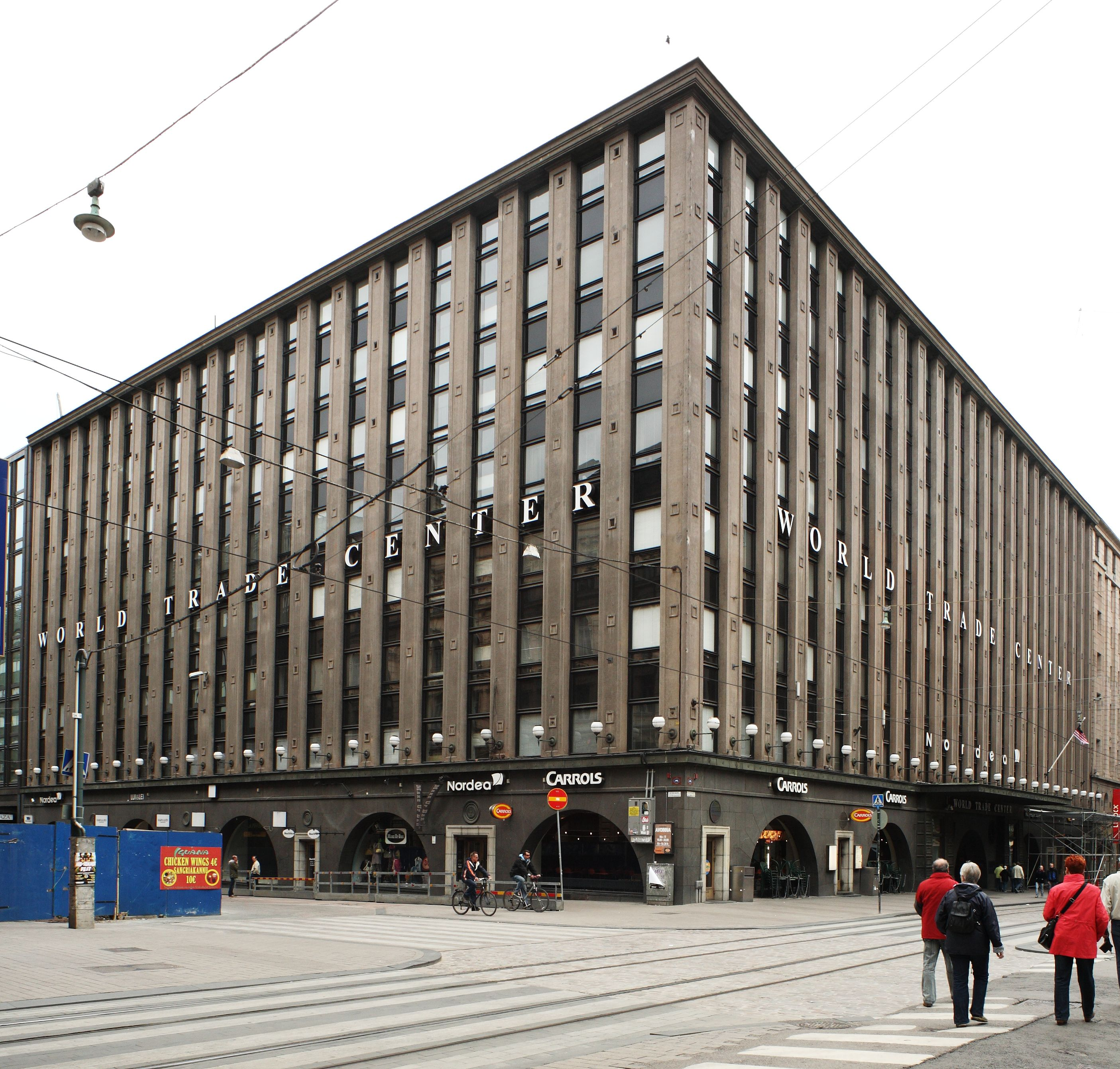
Former head office of Helsingin Osakepankki in Helsinki, lately World Trade Center

Helsingin Osakepankki (HOP, Swedish: Helsingfors Aktiebank, lit. 'Joint-Stock Bank of Helsinki') was a Finnish commercial bank that was active from 1913 to 1985, based in Helsinki. In 1985 it was acquired by Suomen Yhdyspankki, itself a predecessor entity of Nordea.

HOP absorbed several other banks during its seven-decades existence, including Uudenmaan Osakepankki (Swedish: Nylands Aktiebank, lit. 'Joint-Stock Bank of Uusimaa', est. 1887 in Helsinki), Suomen Kauppapankki (lit. 'Finnish Commercial Bank', est. 1907 in Viipuri), Osakepankki Ulkomaankauppaa varten (Swedish: Aktiebanken för Utrikeshandel, lit. 'Joint-Stock Bank for Foreign Trade', est. 1919 in Helsinki), and Atlas Pankki (est. 1919 in Oulu as Pohjois-Suomen Pankki, lit. 'Bank of Northern Finland', renamed and relocated to Helsinki in 1924).

== History ==
Helsingin Osakepankki arose in 1913 as the banking firm E. Winckelmann & Co. was reorganized into a commercial joint-stock bank. Businessman Emil Winckelmann then lured the Swedish Wallenberg family as shareholders, who however left after a few years.

HOP then expanded into a nationwide commercial bank, absorbing peers via acquisitions of Uudenmaan Osakepankki in 1919, Suomen Kauppapankki and Aktiebanken för Utrikeshandel in 1924, and Atlas Pankki in 1929. A more transformational transaction was HOP's acquisition of troubled Liittopankki in 1931, which propelled HOP into the top league of Finnish banks. HOP subsequently relocated its head office into the iconic Liittopankki head office building on Aleksanterinkatu, which had been completed just two years earlier. Even so, it operated within a smaller area than its larger peers Kansallispankki and Yhdyspankki because HOP, which was associated with Finland's Swedish-speaking community, long restrained itself from entering the Finnish-speaking countryside.

Building a comprehensive branch network was a major challenge for the bank, and it ran into profitability problems in the mid-1970s. The bank also acquired customers with poor profitability because it had to compete in customer acquisition by offering loans at lower interest rates. In the 1980s, HOP practically made permanent operating losses. An attempt was made in 1984 to reorganize the bank's operations, but failed to stem the losses. The bank then incurred a large foreign exchange loss of 40 million markka. In 1984, the bank had 113 branches and its balance sheet total was over 9.3 billion markka.

By 1985, HOP's Swedish-speaking shareholders were further dissatisfied because Olli Ikkala, a Finnish-speaker, had been elected as the bank's CEO. In that troubled context, the takeover of HOP by Yhdyspankki in 1985 was Finland's first major corporate takeover battle. Yhdyspankki had been trying to acquire HOP since the 1940s, but without success. It started to secretly acquire shares in HOP in the autumn of 1985. Meanwhile, HOP's previous CEO Filip Petterson offered Säästöpankkien Keskus-Osake-Pankki (SKOP) a seven-percent stake in HOP, presented as a defensive operation to preserve HOP's independence. SKOP acquired additional shares from the market, and on 24 October 1985 it announced that it had purchased more than 11 percent of HOP's shares. Eventually, SKOP increased its stake to 22 percent then sold it to Yhdyspankki on 31 October 1985, by which Yhdyspankki became majority-owner and subsequently made a successful offer for the remaining shares, then fully absorbed HOP in 1986. The episode marked the start of a period of ferocious competition for market share among Finnish banks, which paved the way for the 1990s Finnish banking crisis.

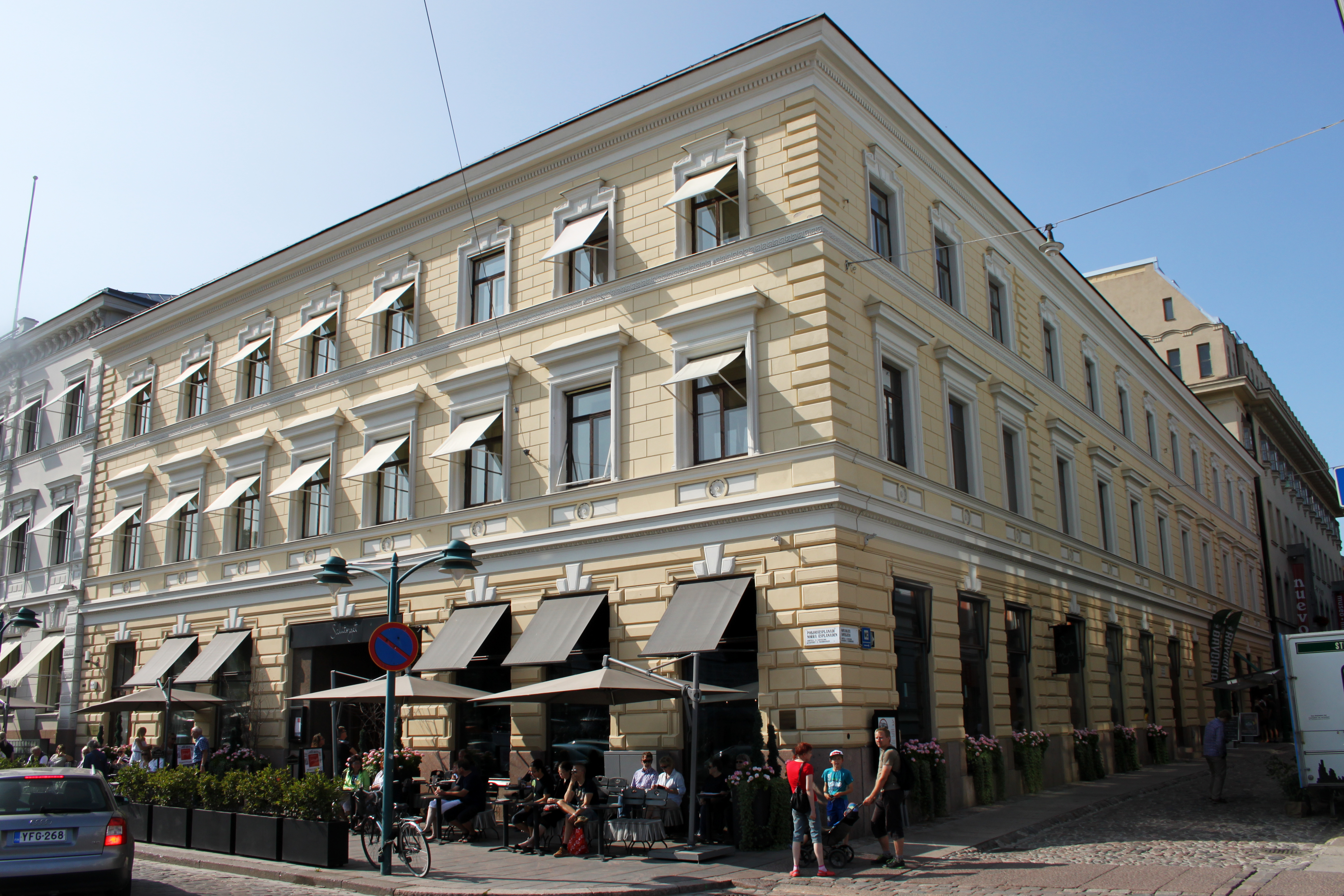
Building at Pohjoisesplanadi 15 in Helsinki, former head office of Uudenmaan Osakepankki which HOP absorbed in 1919

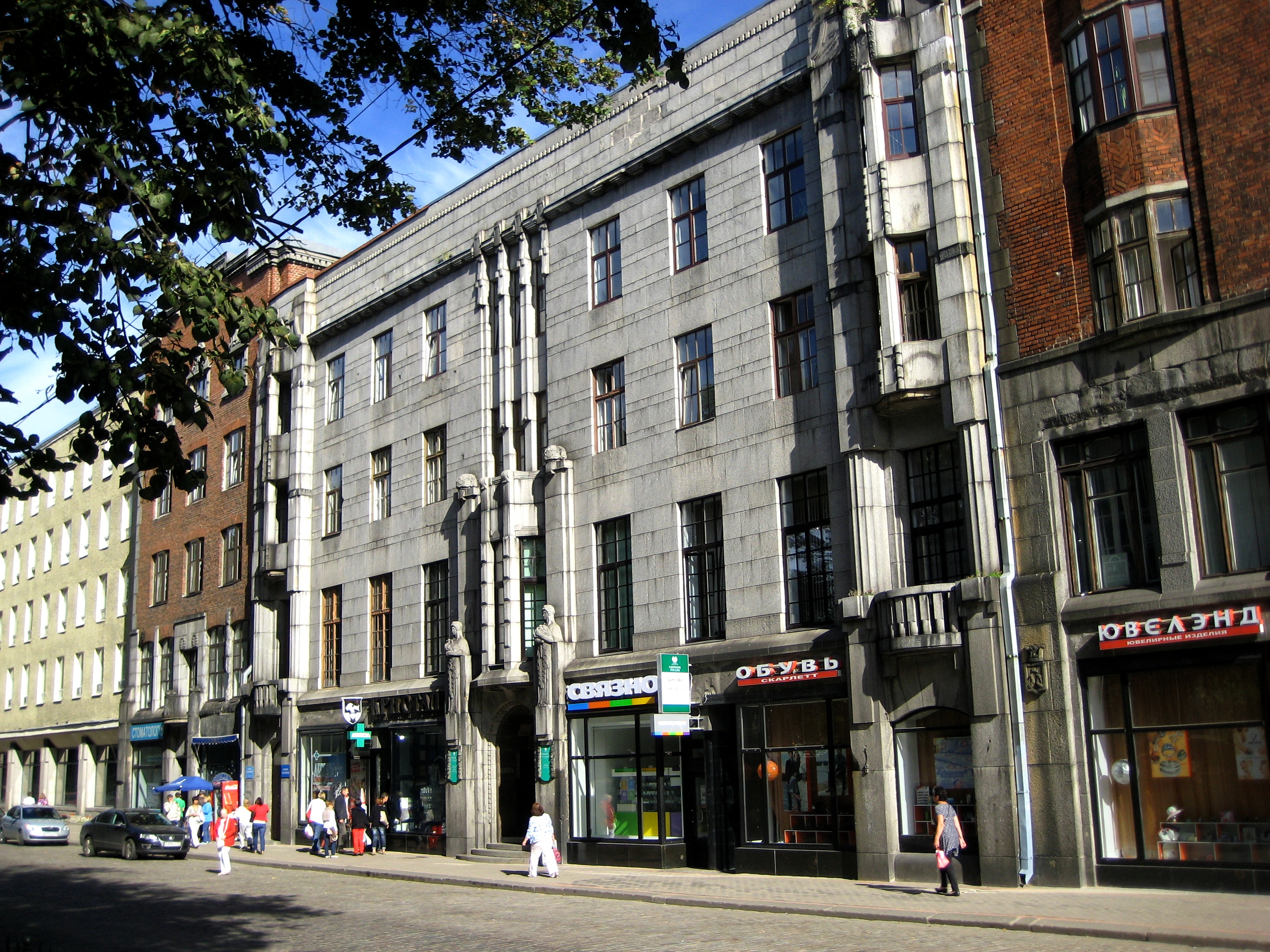
Building at Lenin Prospect 12 in Vyborg, former head office of Suomen Kauppapankki which HOP absorbed in 1924

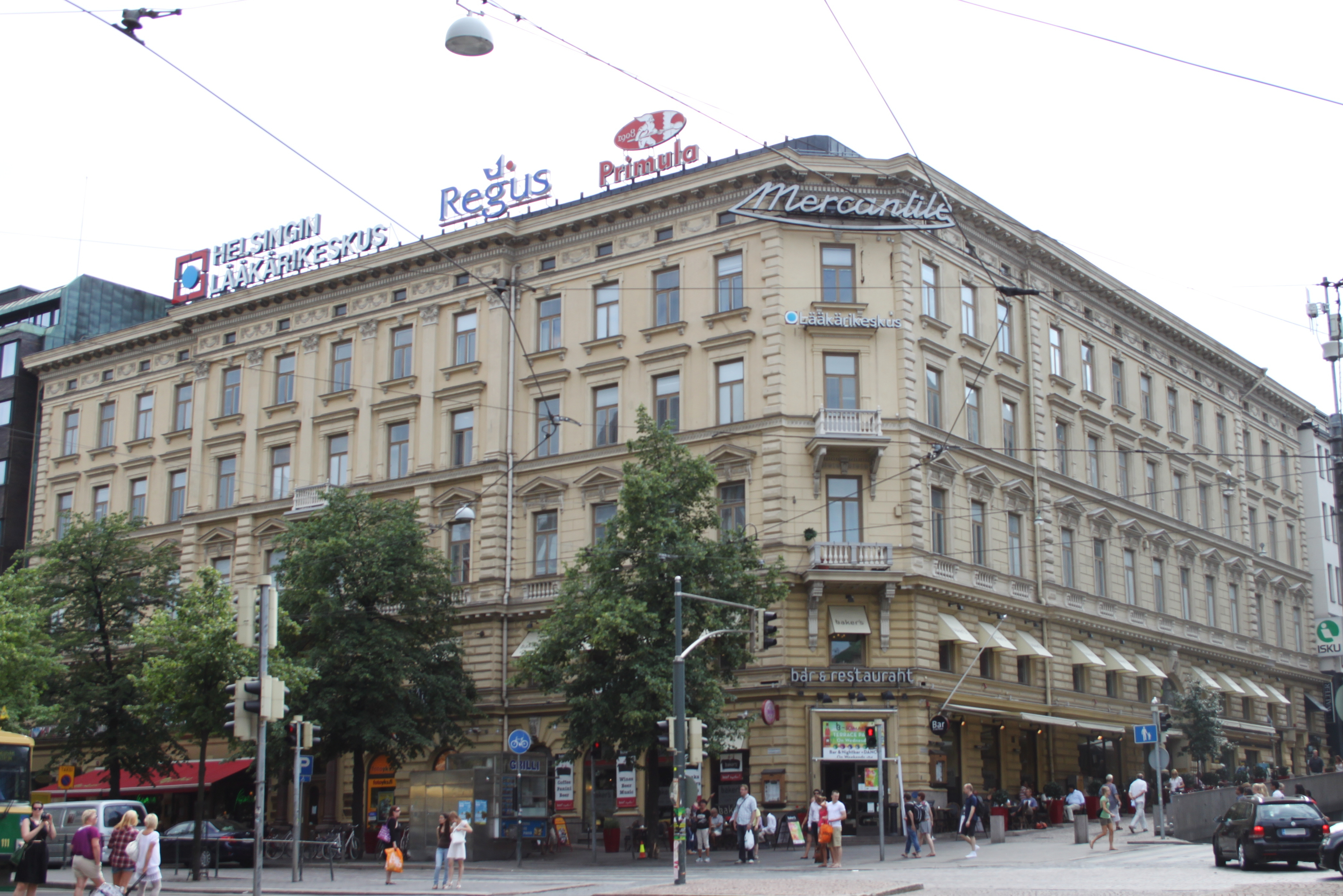
Building at Mannerheimintie 12 (formerly Läntinen Henrikinkatu 14), former head office of Aktiebanken för Utrikeshandel which HOP absorbed in 1924

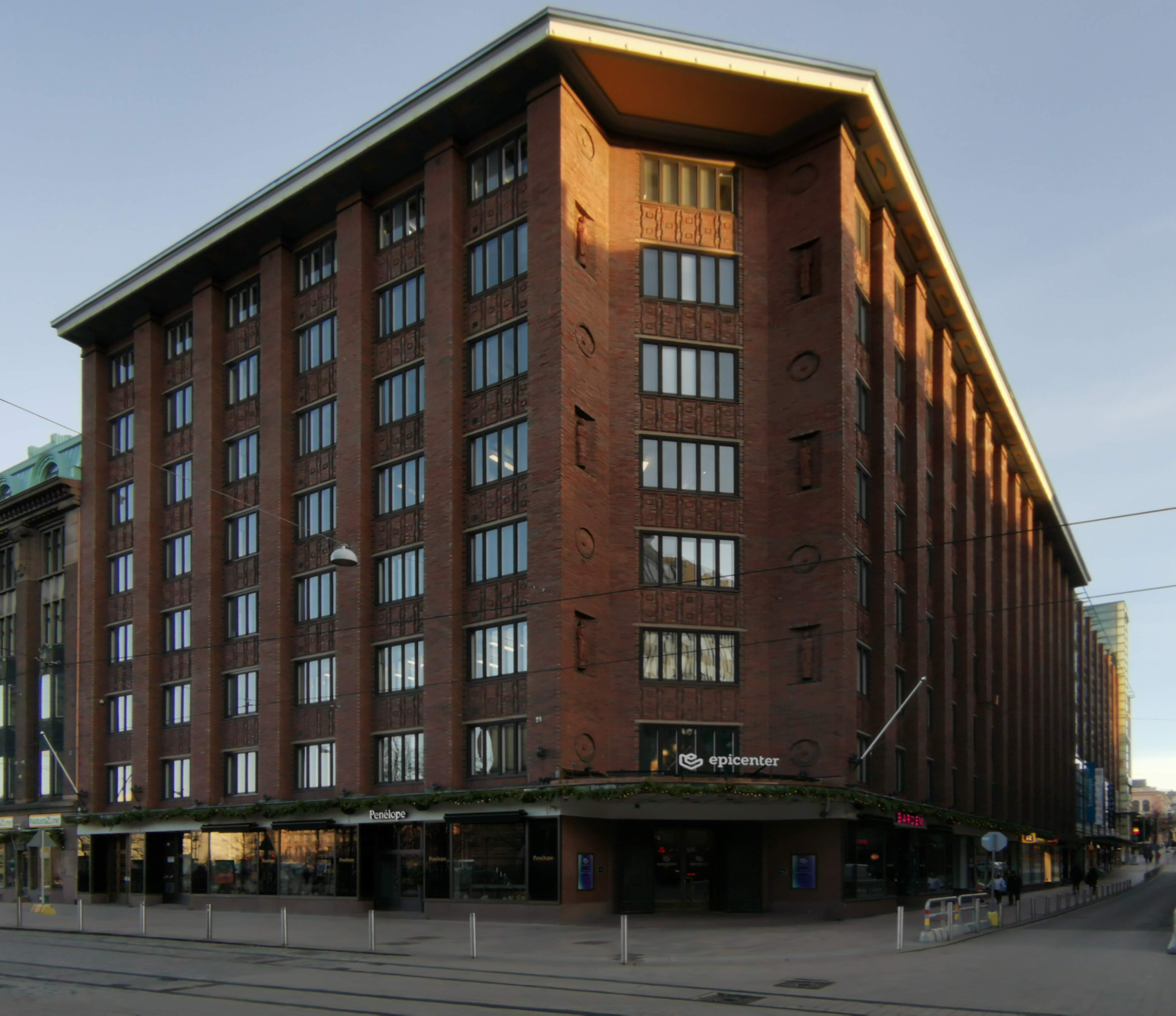
Building at Mikonkatu 9 in Helsinki, former head office of Atlas Pankki which HOP absorbed in 1929

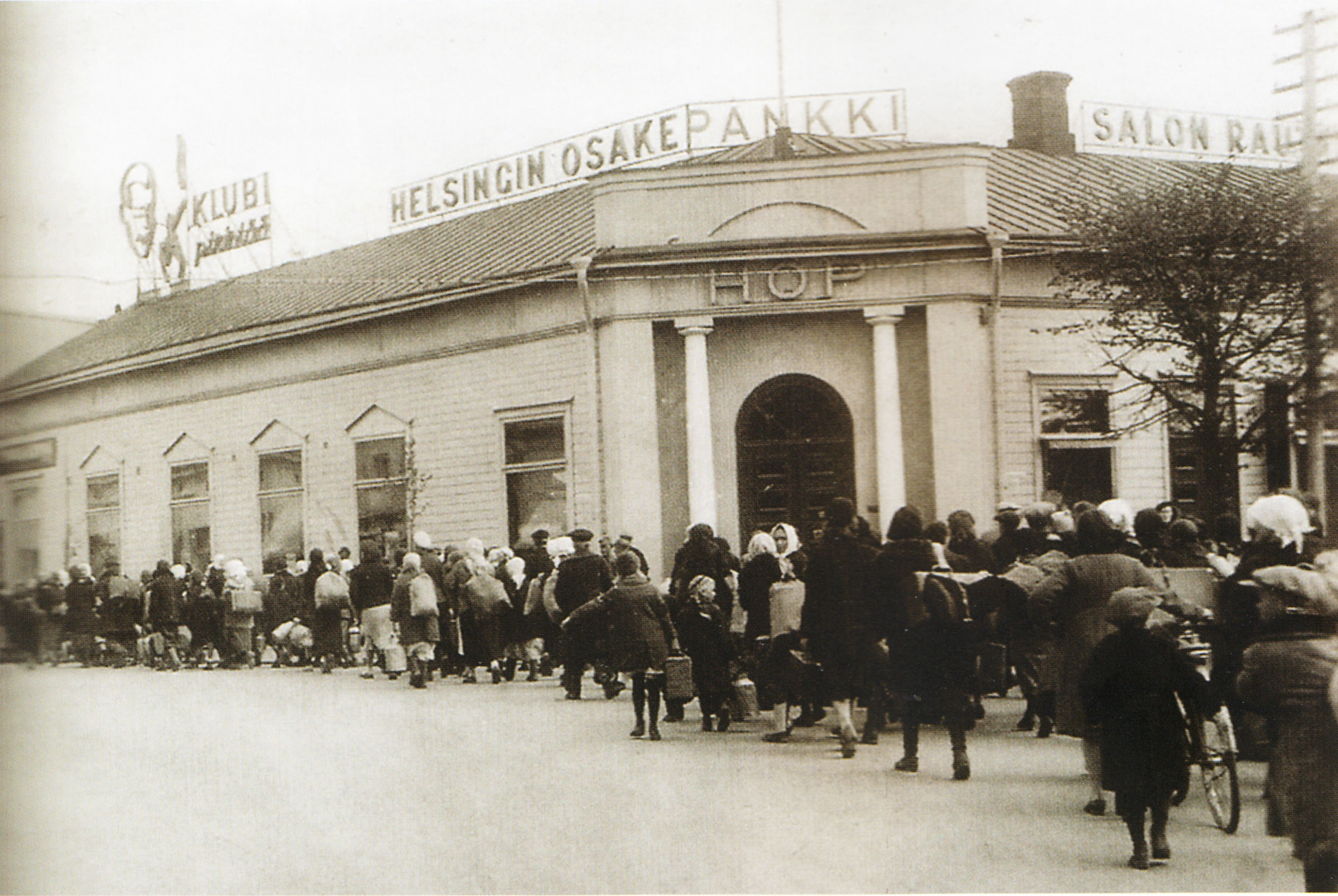
HOP branch in Salo, photographed in 1943

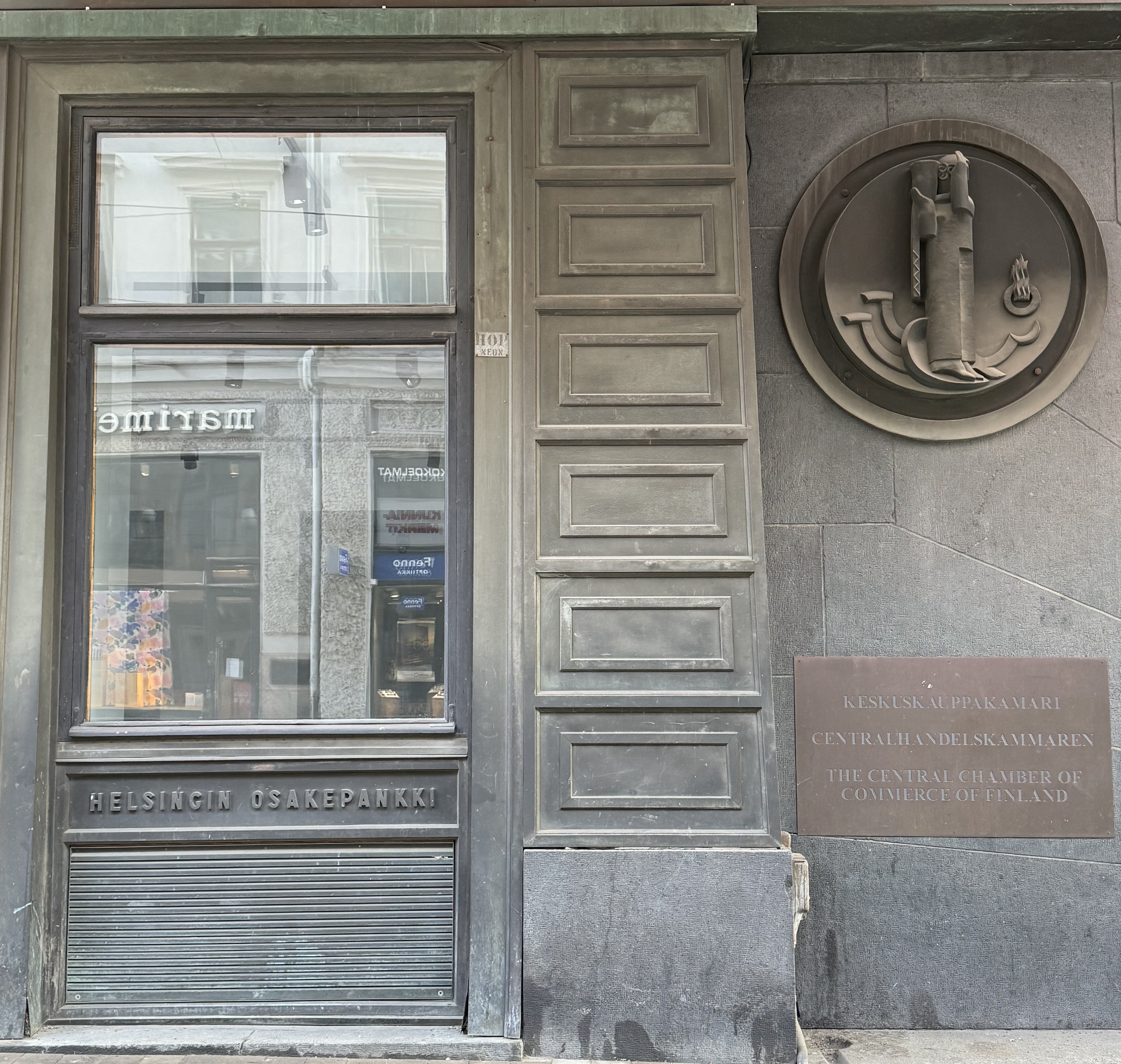
Former HOP head office entrance on Aleksanterinkatu, with the bank's name kept after the building's repurposing

== General Managers ==
- Hans Henrik Estlander (1916–1921)
- Alarik Nystén (1921–1936)
- Rolf Witting (1936–1944)
- Aarne Robert Castrén (1946–1948)
- Armas Makkonen (1948–1956)
- Mauritz Ekholm (1956–1962)
- Carl-Eric Olin (1962–1967)
- Filip Pettersson (1967–1983)
- Olli Ikkala (1983–1986)

== See also ==
- List of banks in Finland
