= List of banks in Åland =

This is a list of banks in Åland.

== Commercial banks ==
- Bank of Åland

== Co-operative banks (OP-Pohjola Group) ==
- Andelsbanken för Åland
