= Aktia Bank =

Finnish bank

Aktia Bank Plc
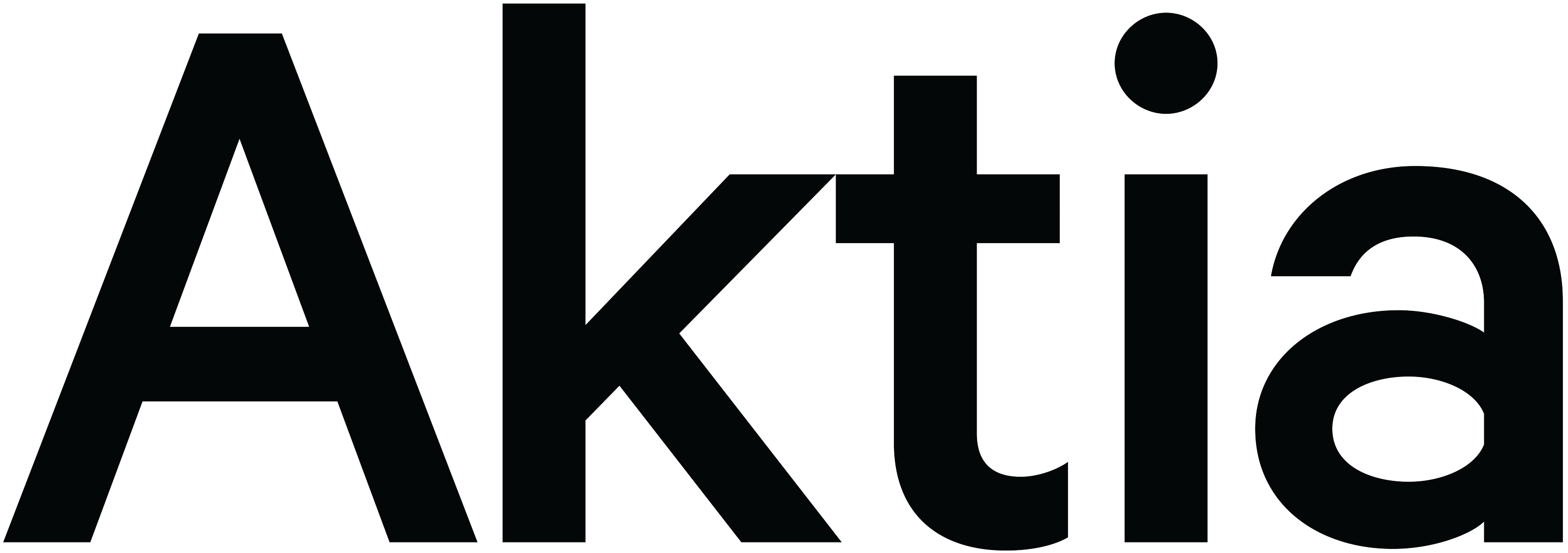

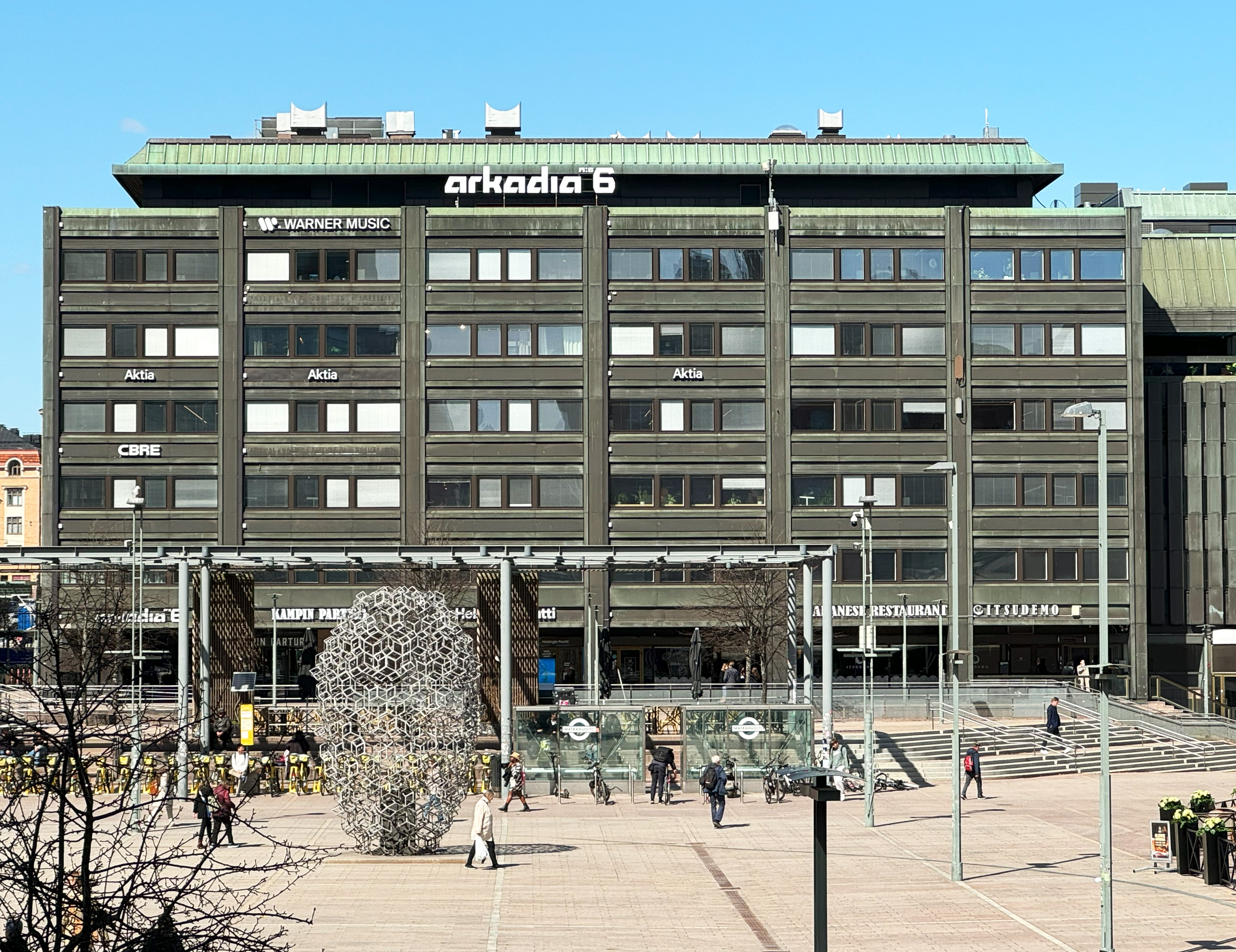
- Arkadia 6 building in Helsinki, Aktia Bank head office since 2020
- Type: Public
- Industry: Asset management, banking, life insurance
- Founded: 1825
- Headquarters: Helsinki
- Key people: Anssi Huhta
- Number of employees: 850 (2024)
- Website: aktia.com
- Footnotes; Annual Review 2024

Aktia Bank, the former Helsinki Savings Bank (Swedish: Helsingfors Sparbank, Finnish: Helsingin Säästöpankki), is a mid-sized financial services company in Finland, headquartered in Helsinki. It provides digital services to customers in a number of channels and provides personalised services in its offices in the Metropolitan Region as well as in the Turku, Tampere, Vaasa, Oulu and Kuopio regions, covering banking, life insurance, and asset management. Aktia's shares are listed on NASDAQ Helsinki.

The name Aktia is derived from the Greek word akti, meaning coast. When the name was introduced in 1991, the bank's area of operation was on the southern coast of Finland. Aktia's predecessor entities operated as savings banks for a long time, but at the beginning of the 21st century Aktia withdrew from the Savings Banks group, became a commercial bank, and was listed on the stock exchange in 2009.

== History ==
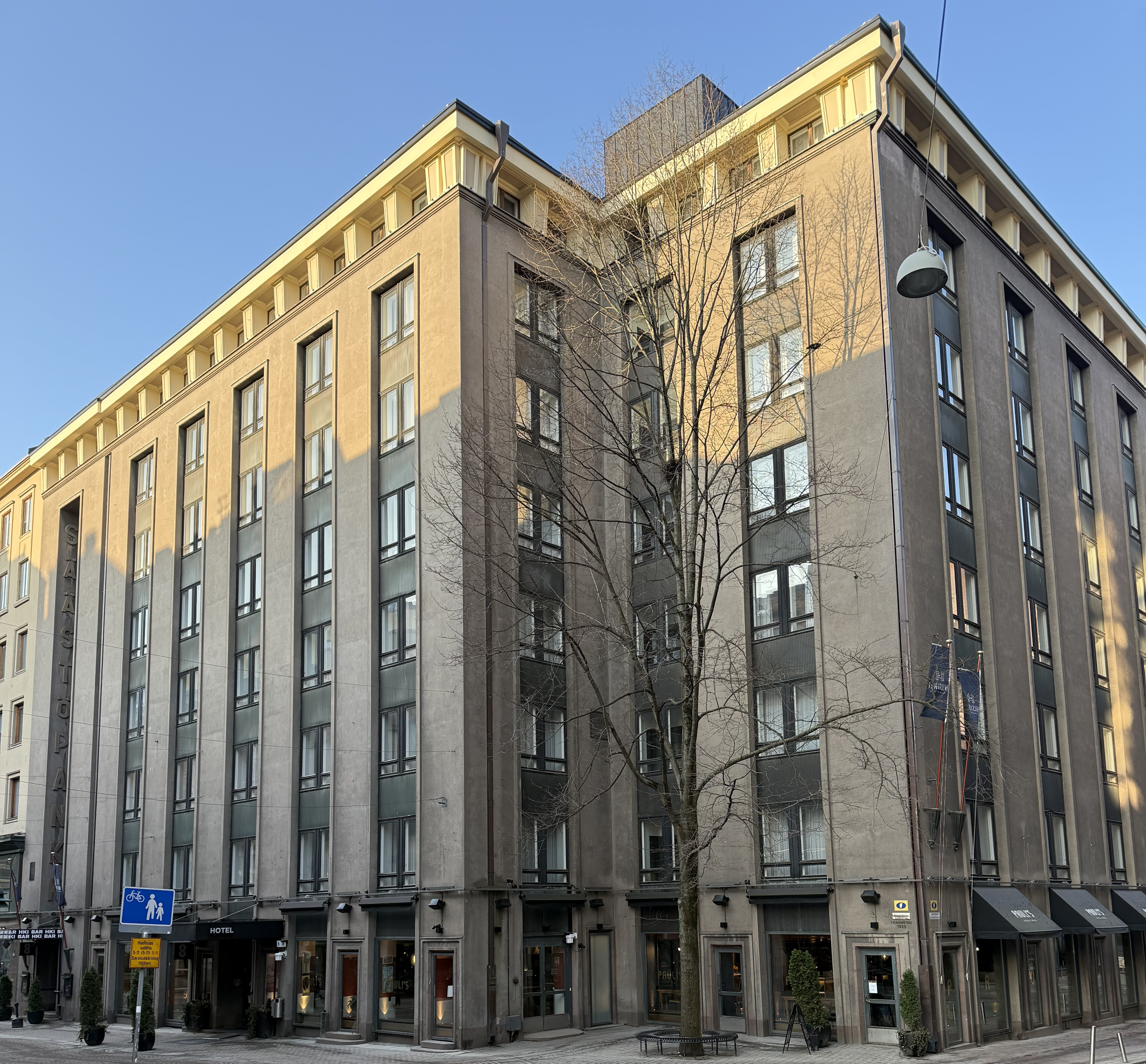
Former head office building of the Helsinki Savings Bank from 1930 to 1963, with monumental lettering Säästöpankki visible on the left; lately Solo Sokos Hotel Helsinki

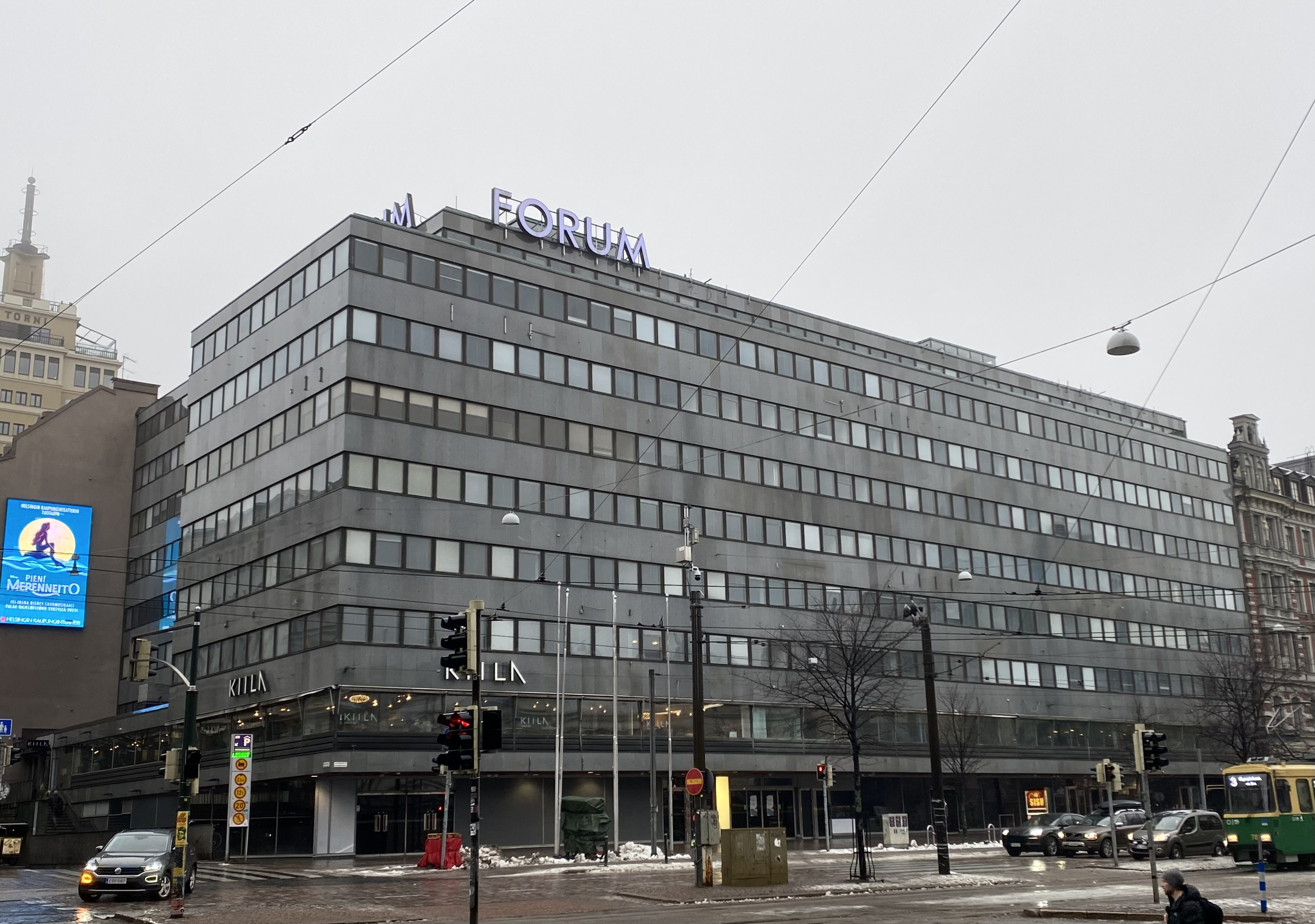
Former head office building of the Helsinki Savings Bank then of Aktia Bank from 1963 to 2020, known lately as Aktia House; demolished in 2023-2024 and replaced by the Signe complex

=== Helsinki City Savings Bank (1825-1891) ===
As successor of the Helsinki Savings Bank, Aktia is the oldest deposit bank currently operating in Finland. Helsingfors Stads Sparbanks Inrättning was established in 1825, the second savings bank in Finland following that founded in Turku in 1822. Social reasons prompted its creation: unemployment, poverty, and beggary had escalated in Helsinki, and poverty relief had been found to make the poor passive. The bank's purpose was to provide safe deposits and interest on money in such a way that saving would encourage “diligence, care, and industriousness” rather than “laziness, forgetfulness, and self-inflicted misery.” The savings bank was to be run without self-interest. The bank opened its doors on 8 April 1826. The first customer was fisherman's daughter Sophia Albertina Schelin, who deposited sixteen shillings in savings account number 1. At first, the bank was only open on Saturday evenings. During the 19th century, the bank expanded its operations. In 1870 it was feared that the public’s increased thriftiness could bring the bank to ruin. The bank could not guarantee that interest would be obtained on the funds deposited, leading to a termination of interest payment if the deposit exceeded a certain amount. By 1875, the bank had 16,745 deposit customers.

=== Helsinki Savings Bank (1891-1991) ===
In 1891, the name of the savings bank was shortened to Helsinki Savings Bank.

In 1930, the bank inaugurated a new head office building in the central Kluuvi neighborhood of Helsinki, designed by architect Pauli E. Blomstedt. The building included a hotel facility from the start, branded Helsinki Hotel and later taken over by Sokos Hotels.

The Helsinki Savings Bank absorbed several other savings banks including Kirkkonummen Säästöpankki in 1956, Säästöpankki Torkkeli in 1979, and Espoon Säästöpankki in 1980. IT was introduced in 1966, first as a service from Sweden. The bank acquired its first computer, a UNIVAC 9200, in 1968.

=== Aktia Bank (since 1991) ===
In 1991, Helsinki Savings Bank absorbed the savings banks of Bromarv, Hanko, Inkoo, Karjaa-Pohja, Sipoo, Siuntio, and Tenhola. It was renamed Savings Bank Aktia. One year later, it absorbed the savings banks of Porvoo and Vaasa. In 1993, Aktia became Finland's second limited savings bank company. The name of the bank was changed to Aktia Savings Bank Ltd in 1994.

In the beginning of the 2000s, Aktia withdrew from the Savings Banks group, became a commercial bank, and was listed on the stock exchange in 2009.

== Operations ==
Aktia provides banking and financial services to private, corporate and organisational customers and institutions. In addition, Aktia provides customers with asset management services and investment products. Aktia also provides customers with life insurance, disability insurance and insurance cover in case of serious illness.

== Aktia as an asset manager ==
Aktia has a focus area in asset management and provides institutions and private customers with asset management services and investment products in Finland and internationally. Aktia’s asset management is a Morningstar Fund Awards and Refinitiv Lipper Fund Awards winner (footnote

== Aktia in society ==
Aktia interacts with public authorities, professional organisations, scientific communities, schools, colleges, and universities. Aktia also supports e.g. local cultural events and sporting and club activities. Aktia publishes an annual Sustainability Report detailing the measures taken to support sustainable development in society. The Annual Review 2024 (in English) includes the Sustainability Report.

== Sustainability ==
Aktia has principles for responsible investment since 2006 and has signed the Principles for Responsible Investment (PRI) and the Principles for Responsible Banking (PRB) endorsed by the UN. Aktia is also a Member of FIBS (Finnish Business & Society), the largest corporate responsibility network in the Nordics, and FINSIF (Finland's Sustainable Investment Forum), a Finnish organisation promoting responsible investment.

== Shareholders ==
At the end of December 2023, the total number of registered shareholders was approximately 40,000

Aktia is owned by Finnish Aktia and savings bank foundations, institutions, and private individuals. Aktia foundations and savings banks foundations own a significant part of the shares.

== See also ==
- List of banks in the euro area
- List of banks in Finland
