= Liittopankki =

Former Finnish bank

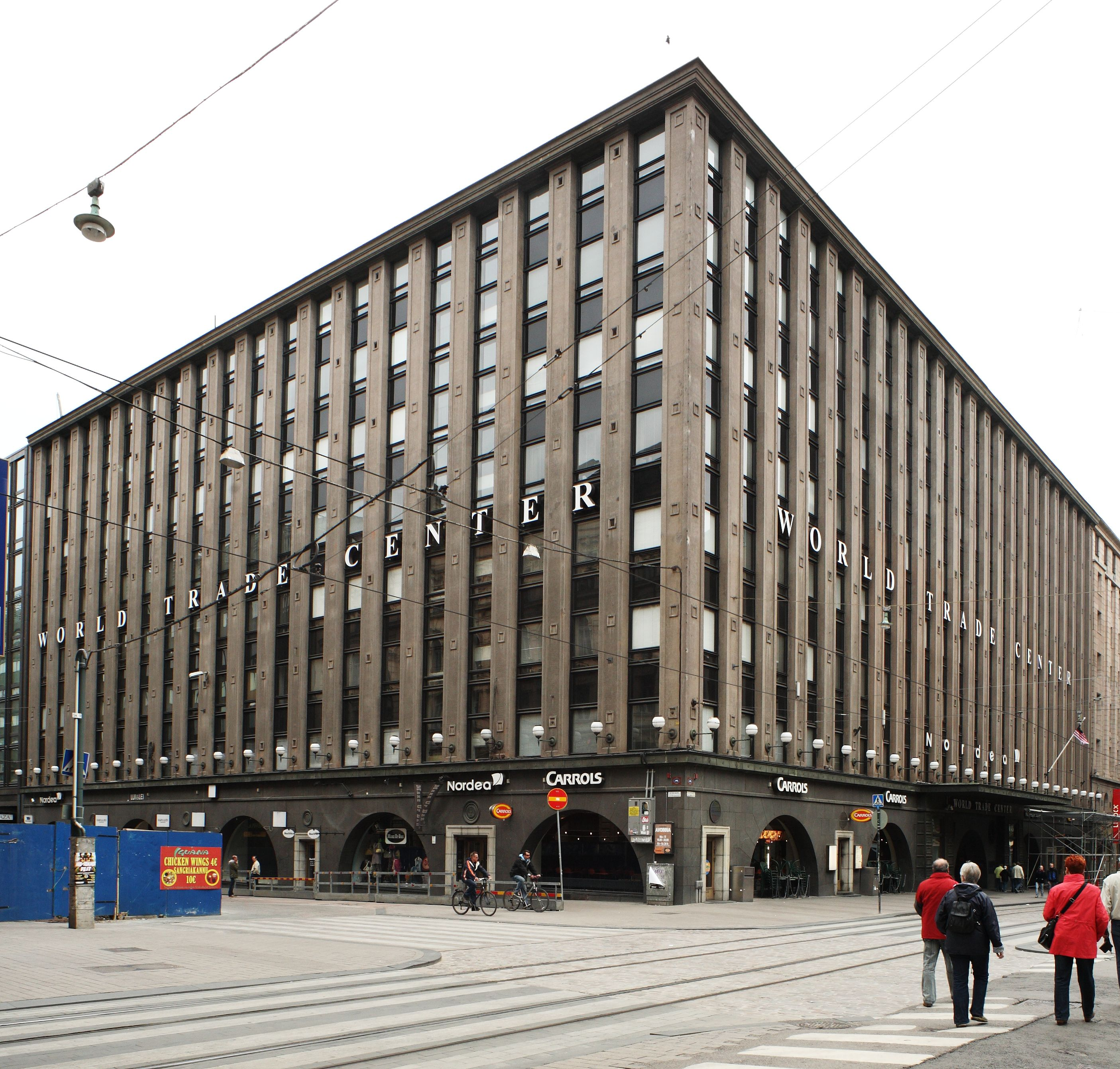
- Head office of Liittopankki in Helsinki, completed in 1929 on a design by architect Pauli E. Blomstedt, used after 1931 by Helsingin Osakepankki
- Type: Joint-stock company
- Industry: Financial services
- Predecessor: Vaasan Osake-Pankki, Turun Osakepankki, Landtmannabanken
- Founded: 1920
- Defunct: 1931
- Fate: Acquired
- Successor: Helsingin Osakepankki
- Headquarters: World Trade Center, Finland

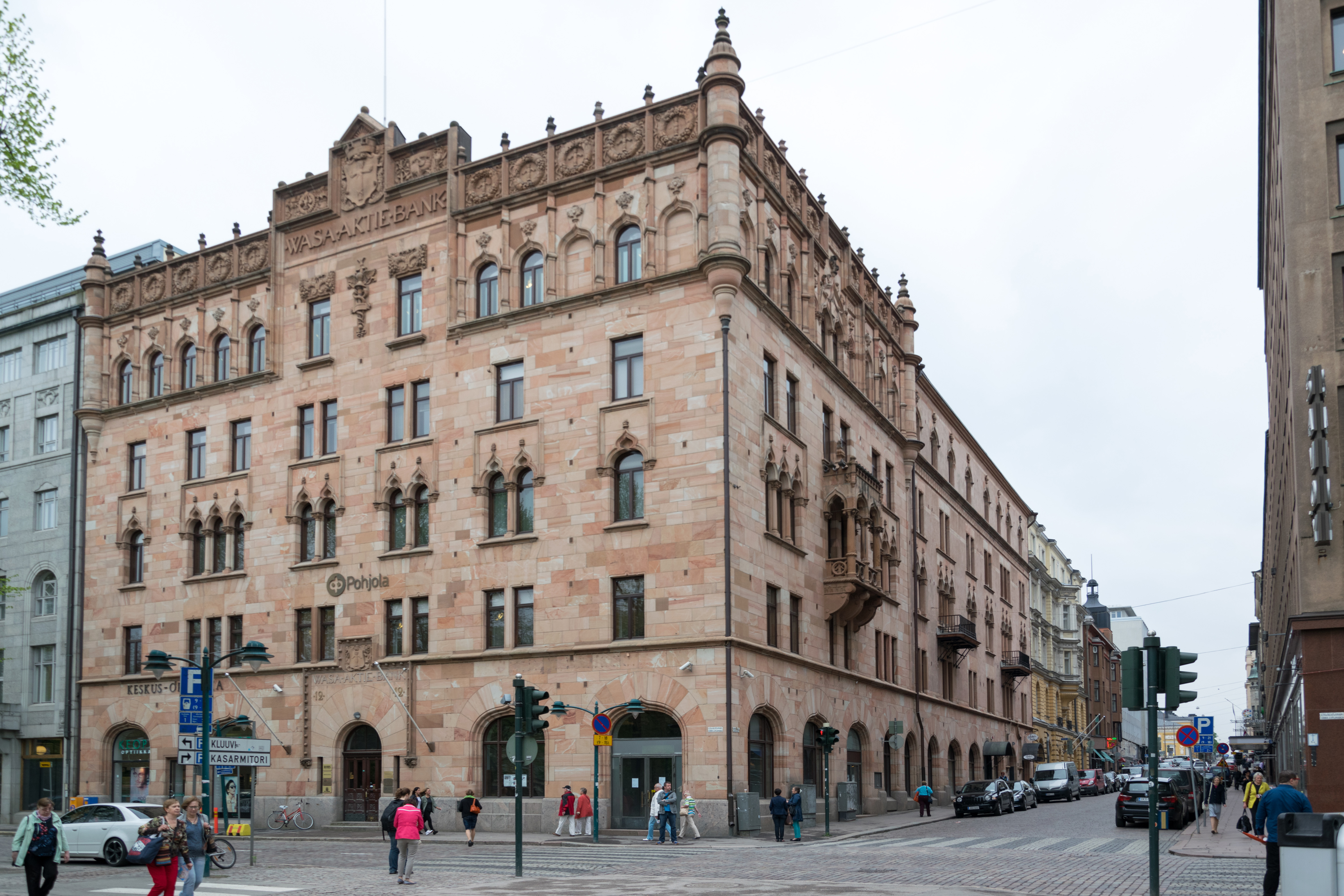
Vaasa Joint-Stock Bank branch building on Esplanadi in Helsinki, displaying its name in Swedish

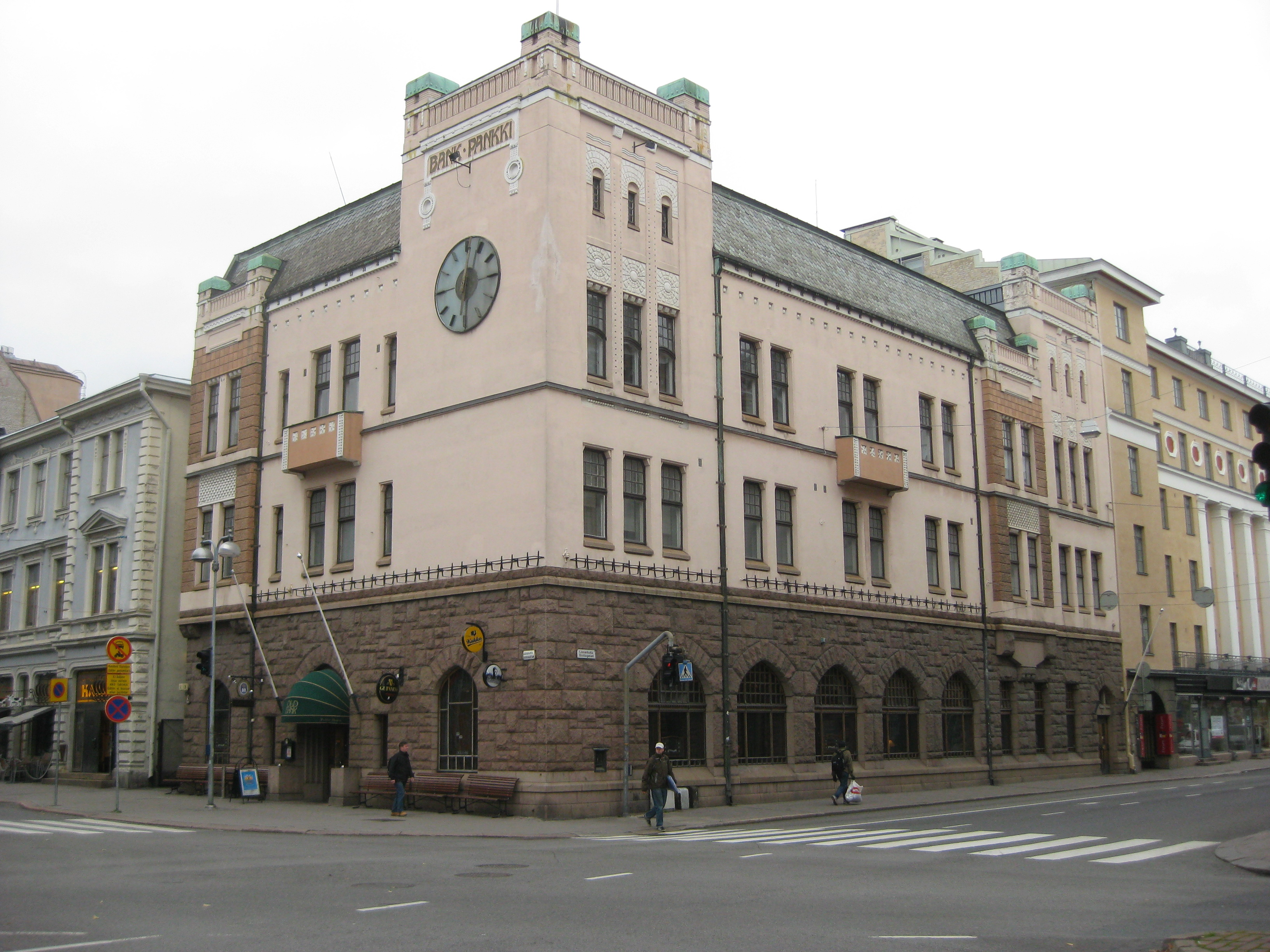
Turku Joint-Stock Bank building, completed 1907 on a design by architect Frithiof Strandell

Liittopankki (lit. 'Federal Bank', Swedish: Aktiebolaget Unionbanken i Finland) was a large bank in Finland during the interwar period, headquartered in Helsinki.

It was established in 1920 by merger of three medium-sized Finnish credit institutions, respectively Vaasan Osake-Pankki (Swedish: Vaasa Aktie-Bank, lit. 'Joint-Stock Bank of Vaasa', est. 1878 in Vaasa), Turun Osakepankki (Swedish: Åbo Aktiebank, lit. 'Joint-Stock Bank of Turku', est. 1896 in Turku), and Landtmannabanken, (lit. 'Farmers' Bank', est. 1910 in Helsinki).

Liittopankki suffered from the European banking crisis of 1931, three years after having absorbed the troubled Etelä-Suomen Pankki (lit. 'Bank of Southern Finland', est. 1917). It was itself absorbed that year by Helsingin Osakepankki, one of the predecessor entities of present-day Nordea.

== History ==
=== Vaasa Joint-Stock Bank (1878-1920) ===
Vaasan Osake-Pankki was founded on the initiative of Vaasa businessman Joachim Kurtén, who organized a preliminary share subscription with local merchants and businessmen in the autumn of 1878. The founding meeting of the bank was held in December 1878. The bank started operations on 4 August 1879. Beyond its initial local focus, the bank soon established branches throughout Finland and operated increasingly as a national commercial bank. It had a particular strong position in credit to grain merchants in Ostrobothnia. Its shares were listed on the Helsinki Stock Exchange between 1912 and 1920.

The Bank of Vaasa suffered major credit losses before World War I, which it survived thanks to its strong balance sheet. In 1918 during the Finnish Civil War, as the Bank of Finland's printing presses were in the hands of the Red side, it was granted emergency permission to issue its own banknote-like payment instruments, referred to as konttokuranttisekeiksi, in denominations of 25, 100 and 500 markkas.

=== Turku Joint-Stock Bank (1896-1920) ===
Turun Osakepankki, which went exclusively by its Swedish name Åbo Aktiebank until 1907, was founded by local businesspeople including the Rettig family and the brothers Ernest and Magnus Dahlström. The bank established a strong position in financing the wood processing industry and trade with Russia. Its shares were listed on the Helsinki Stock Exchange in 1912. By 1919, it had 7 branches and deposits of 87 million marks.

=== Farmers' Bank (1910-1920) ===
Landtmannabanken focused on providing short-term loans to the Swedish-speaking agricultural population. It started operations on 18 July 1910. Its shares were listed on the Helsinki Stock Exchange in 1912.

In 1916-1917, Landtmannabanken purchased a plot of land at the corner of Aleksanterinkatu and Keskuskatu in central Helsinki to erect a new head office building. The project was delayed by the turmoil of the late 1910s, but was eventually brought to fruition by Liittopankki in the late 1920s.

=== Merger into Suomen Liittopankki and aftermath ===
In 1920, The three banks merged to form Suomen Liittopankki Osakeyhtiö (lit. 'Federal Bank of Finland Ltd'). Gustaf Mannerheim became the chairman of the bank's board.

The merger was intended to pool resources, rationalize the branch network, and save costs. It was not successful, however, and the individual entities continued to operate largely independently, each with its own directors and decision-making framework.

In 1924, the bank was reorganized as a single parent entity with name shortened to Liittopankki Osakeyhtiö, with exchange of three shares of the former Federal Bank for one share in the new bank. An additional 40 percent new capital was raised. Gustaf Mannerheim remained as chairman of the board. In 1928, the group also absorbed the troubled Etelä-Suomen Pankki.

== See also ==
- List of banks in Finland
