= Finnish Savings Banks Group =

Finnish retail banking group

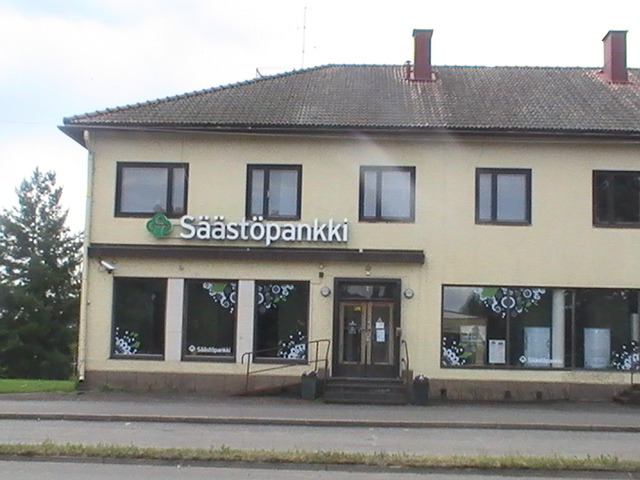
- A savings bank branch in Säkylä
- Native name: Säästöpankki
- Company type: Savings Bank Limited Liability Company
- Industry: Financial services
- Founded: 1822; 204 years ago
- Headquarters: Helsinki, Finland
- Area served: Finland
- Products: Banking services, insurance
- Number of employees: 1,400 (2024)
- Website: www.saastopankki.fi

The Finnish Savings Banks Group (sometimes "Savings Bank Group"), in Finnish Säästöpankkiryhmä, is a banking group in Finland consisting of 14 independent regional and local savings banks as well as central bodies in Helsinki. As of 2026, all Finnish credit institutions with the name "savings bank" (Finnish: Säästöpankki, Swedish: Sparbank) are members of the Savings Banks Group except Oma Säästöpankki, originally an independent savings bank which has evolved into a listed entity.

At end-2024 the group had €13.9 billion in consolidated total assets whereas its central bank (Säästöpankkien Keskuspankki) had €3.6 billion and its mortgage bank (SP-Rahastoyhtiö) had €3.3 billion. All entities of the group are designated as less significant institutions under European Banking Supervision.

== History ==
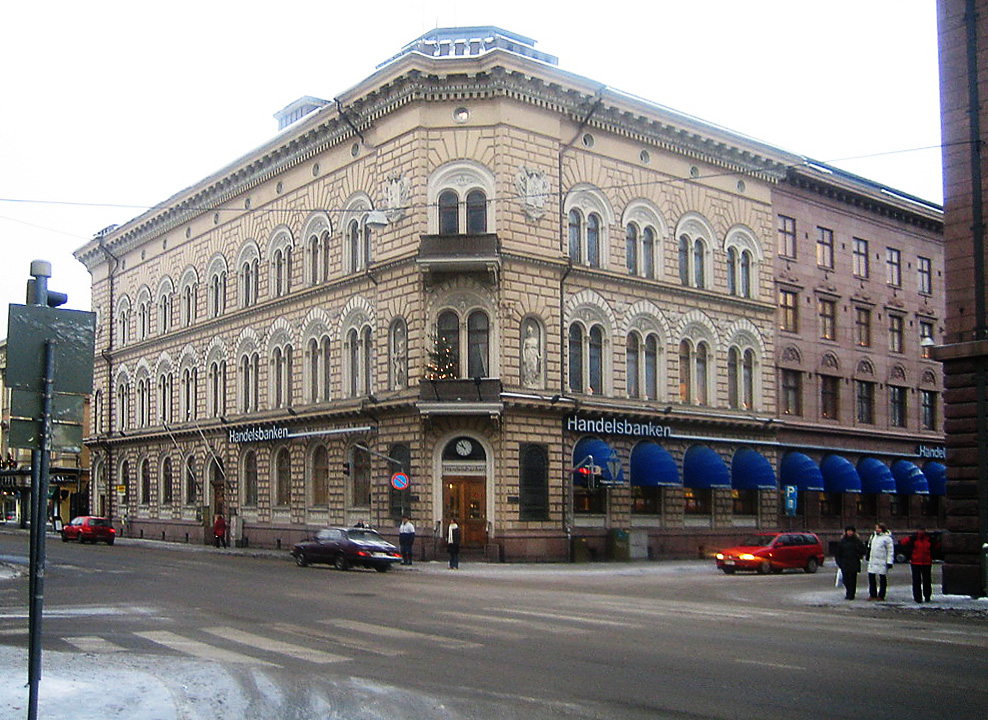
Former building of the Turku Savings Bank

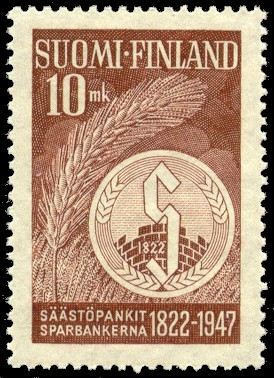
Stamp celebrating the 125th anniversary of Turku Savings Bank, 1947

The first savings bank in present-day Finland was the Turku Savings Bank (Swedish: Åbo Sparbank), founded in 1822 in Turku / Åbo on the initiative of John von Julin and maintained as an independent institution until a sequence of mergers starting in 1989. That institution and the country's other early savings banks, sich as Helsinki Savings Bank established in 1825, were largely associated with the Swedish-speaking minority. Starting in the 1890s with the rise of Finnish nationalism, new savings banks were targeted at Finnish-speakers starting with Ouluun Säästöpankki Sampo (est. 1891 in Oulu) and including Helsingin Suomalainen Säästöpankki (est. 1901 in Helsinki), Viipurin Suomalainen Säästöpankki (est. 1902 in Viipuri), and Turun Suomalainen Säästöpankki (est. 1904 in Turku). Starting in 1899, another set of initiatives led to the establishment of workers' savings banks (Finnish: Työväen Säästöpankki, Swedish: Arbetarsparbanken) such as Työväen Säästöpankki Helsingissä (est. 1909 in Helsinki), Hämeen Työväen Säästöpankki (est. 1914 in Tampere), and Oulun Työväen Säästöpankki (est. 1932 in Oulu).

In 1895, the first general decree on savings banks was passed, and they were brought under the scope of state inspection. In response, the Finnish savings banks built up a national structure in the early 20th century. In 1906 they formed the Savings Banks Association (Säästöpankkiliitto), and in 1908 the Säästöpankkien Keskus-Osake-Pankki (SKOP, lit. 'Central Bank of the Finnish Savings Banks'), a joint-stock entity owned by the local savings banks and in which they could deposit their cash reserves. Conversely, the SKOP would secure the local banks' liquidity in all circumstances, including in the event of sudden large deposit withdrawals. SKOP invested the corresponding amounts safely at the Bank of Finland, from which it could also receive credit. In 1918, a new Savings Bank Act caused changes in the operations of individual savings banks. By 1923, 76 of the country's 187 savings banks had become members of Säästöpankkiliitto, which they ran collectively via 24 local associations. In 1926, Säästöpankkiliitto had grown to 356 members, or three-quarters of the country's 467 local savings banks at the time.

In early 1954, the supervision and inspection of savings banks was transferred from the state to the Säästöpankkiliitto, but remained under the oversight of the Ministry of Finance. In the mid-1950s, the 414 local savings banks together represented the largest banking group in Finland, with a deposit share of approximately 34 percent.

In the 1960s, SKOP's activity expanded to providing direct financing to companies that individual savings banks were unable to handle, including distressed borrowers. Such business financing activities, however, remained modest until the 1980s. Meanwhile in 1970, the Workers' Savings Banks were consolidated into a single entity, the Finnish Workers' Savings Bank (Suomen Työväen Säästöpankki) also known as STS-Bank.

Following a management change in 1985, SKOP started engaging in more aggressive risk-taking in securities, real estate and other investments in Finland's so-called "casino economy" of the late 1980s, as did several individual savings banks. SKOP, whose shares were listed on the Helsinki Stock Exchange on 22 November 1988, overpaid in politically-driven transactions such as the bail-out of troubled industrial manufacturer Tampella. It also expanded rapidly abroad, including in Luxembourg, the Netherlands, the United States, and tax havens such as the Cayman Islands. As interest rates rose in late 1989, SKOP and other Finnish banks found themselves in financial distress. SKOP CEO Matti Ali-Melkkilä committed suicide in mid-December 1989. Some of its investments turned into disasters, such as Tampella and a hotel project in the US Virgin Islands as well as loans in the Soviet Union.

SKOP consequently found itself at the center of the 1990s Finnish banking crisis. In the summer of 1991, it lost market access for its funding, and on 19 September 1991, the Bank of Finland announced that it would take it over. Later that year, the bank's bad loans were transferred to Omaisuudenhoitoyhtiö Arsenal Oy, an asset management company (or bad bank) established by the Government of Finland to clean up the country's financial system and especially the savings banks sector which represented as much as 96 percent of the losses.

In 1992, Suomen Säästöpankki (SSP, lit. 'Savings Bank of Finland') was established to address the sector's crisis and channel government assistance to individual savings banks. The state committed to supporting SSP through Säästöpankkien Vakuusrahaston, a sector-specific guarantee fund. SSP started operations on 21 September 1992, then reorganized later that year as a limited liability company (Suomen Säästöpankki Oy) so that it could receive state support, as its financial condition was rapidly deteriorating. Eventually, the SSP was dismantled in 1993 and its branches sold to four bidders, namely Suomen Yhdyspankki (122 branches), Kansallis-Osake-Pankki (KOP, 135 branches), Postipankki (153 branches), and the OP Financial Group (246 branches). Many of these branches were subsequently restructured or closed. Also in 1992, STS-Bank was also restructured with much of its operations sold to KOP, and ownership of the loss-making SKOP was transferred from the Bank of Finland to the State Guarantee Fund, which prevented it from taking up new business. Attempts to sell it were unsuccessful for several years, but in 1995 a sizeable portion of SKOP's loans and assets were purchased by Handelsbanken. The rump entity had its banking license withdrawn in 1995, was renamed Yrityspankki Skop in 1996, and filed for voluntary liquidation in 1999, a process that was completed with formal wind-up on 15 June 2015. Also in 1995, the former Helsinki Savings Bank, renamed Aktia Bank following merger with seven other savings banks in 1991, took up SKOP's former role as the central financial institution for savings banks.

In the early 2000s, Aktia Bank transformed itself into a commercial bank, listed on the stock exchange in 2009. In 2012, it announced that it would relinquish its role as the savings banks' central services provider by 2015. To replace it, savings banks on 18 April 2013 purchased Itella Pankki from the Posti Group, which had formed it in 2012 as a banking subsidiary, and renamed it Säästöpankkien Keskuspankki (lit. 'Central Bank of Savings Banks'). In early 2014, Säästöpankkiliitto was reorganized from an association into a cooperative banking entity, even though it kept its former name. By then, the number of independent savings banks operating in Finland had shrunk to 29, of which 25 remained in the new framework for risk-sharing, whereas two of the other savings banks were absorbed by Aktia Bank and Oma Säästöpankki charted its own independent course.

In 2022, one of the largest banks in the group, Liedon Säästöpankki, announced that it would leave the Savings Banks Group and merge with Oma Säästöpankki, as Eurajoki Säästöpankki had done the previous year, raising concerns about the Savings Banks Group's sustainability.

== Group structure and membership ==
Each of the group's local savings banks is either a sui-generis entity without owners or a limited-liability company owned by a savings bank foundation, except Nooa Savings Bank which is owned by other savings banks.

The group's central entities are the Säästöpankkiliitto cooperative, Säästöpankkien Keskuspankki, and SP-Rahastoyhtiö (lit. 'the savings banks' mortgage bank'), complemented by Sp-Henkivakuutusyhtiö (life insurance company), Sp-Koti (real estate agency), and Säästöpankkien Vakuusrahasto (the Savings Bank Guarantee Fund).

Säästöpankkiliitto steers the Savings Banks Group's operations and is responsible for the internal control framework. Säästöpankkien Keskuspankki, which is wholly owned by the group's savings banks, supports its member entities' funding and is involved in interbank payment transactions. In addition, it offers payment transaction, deposit and e-invoicing services to public sector and large corporate customers.

As of early 2026, there were 14 remaining local entities in the Savings Banks Group:

- Aito Säästöpankki
- Avain Säästöpankki
- Helmi Säästöpankki Oy
- Kvevlax Sparbank
- Lammin Säästöpankki
- Länsi-Uudenmaan Säästöpankki
- Myrskylän Säästöpankki
- Nooa Säästöpankki
- Närpes Sparbank ab
- Someron Säästöpankki
- Säästöpankki Kalanti-Pyhäranta
- Säästöpankki Optia Oy
- Säästöpankki Sinetti
- Ekenäs Sparbank

The Savings Banks Group is considered as a single bank for the purpose of deposit insurance, because the entities within the group are fully or partially liable for each other's commitments and obligations.

== See also ==
- Solidium
- POP Bank Group
- List of banks in Finland
- List of banks in the euro area
