= Bank of Åland =

Finnish commercial bank and banking group

Bank of Åland Plc
- Native name: Ålandsbanken
- Company type: Public limited company (Publikt Aktiebolag)
- ISIN: FI0009000103
- Industry: Financial services
- Founded: 1919
- Headquarters: Mariehamn, Åland
- Area served: Åland, Finland and Sweden
- Key people: Peter Wiklöf, President and CEO; Nils Lampi, Chairman of the board
- Products: Banking
- Revenue: EUR 202.30 million (2023)
- Net income: EUR 61.70 million (2023)
- Total assets: ▼EUR€5.340 billion(2023); EUR€5.896 billion(2022); EUR€6.633 billion(2021)
- Number of employees: 900+ (2023)
- Subsidiaries: Ålandsbanken Fonder AB | Ålandsbanken Fondbolag Ab | Ålandsbanken Asset Management Ab | Ålandsbanken Equities Ab | Alpha Management Company S.A | Ab Compass Card Ltd Oy
- Rating: A3/ P-2 for long- and short-term deposit ratings (Moody's Ratings)
- Website: www.alandsbanken.com

Bank of Åland Plc (Swedish: Ålandsbanken) is a Finnish commercial bank and banking group with over 700 employees and operations in Åland, Finland and Sweden. The bank was founded in 1919 and was listed on the stock exchange in 1942. Its president and CEO is Peter Wiklöf.

== History ==
Bank of Åland was founded in 1919 and has been listed on the Helsinki Stock Exchange since 1942. In the 1990s Bank of Åland expanded its operations to the Finnish mainland and in March 2009 the bank established itself in Sweden through the acquisition of the Icelandic Kaupthing Bank Sverige AB.

=== The acquisition of Kaupthing Bank Sverige AB ===
In October 2008 Kaupthing hf in Iceland was nationalized and the shares in the subsidiary Kaupthing Bank Sverige AB were taken by the Swedish National Bank as a pledge. In March 2009 Bank of Åland Plc acquired most of Kaupthing's Swedish activities.

Bank of Åland paid SEK 388 million for the companies Kaupthing Bank Sverige AB, Kaupthing Fonder AB and Alpha Management Company S.A, with a total balance sheet of SEK 5 billion and an equity of SEK 832 million. The acquisition included operations in private banking, wealth management and institutional equity trading. Most of the lending to companies was not included in the deal, but was transferred to its parent company Kaupthing hf. The liquidity support Kaupthing Bank Sverige AB received from the Bank of Sweden in autumn 2008 was repaid in full. Kaupthing Bank Sverige AB changed its name to Ålandsbanken Sverige AB.

== Activity ==
Bank of Åland has 30 branch offices across Finland and Sweden and the number of retail and private banking customers is about 90,000. In Finland, Bank of Åland is a full service bank focused on private banking and premium banking. The Swedish branch, Ålandsbanken Sverige, has private banking and asset management as its main business areas. It was converted from a subsidiary into a branch on 1 December 2011.

Bank of Åland has 19 branch offices on the Åland Islands. The branch offices in the Finnish mainland are located in Helsinki, Espoo, Turku, Pargas, Tampere and Vaasa. In Sweden, the branch offices are situated in Stockholm, Gothenburg and Malmö.

The Bank of Åland group includes wholly owned Crosskey Banking Solutions Ab Ltd, which is a Nordic provider of banking services with 150 employees and offices in Mariehamn, Stockholm, Helsinki and Turku. Other subsidiaries are Ålandsbanken Fonder AB, Ålandsbanken Fondbolag Ab, Ålandsbanken Asset Management Ab, Ålandsbanken Equities Ab, Alpha Management Company S.A. and Ab Compass Card Ltd Oy.

The group headquarters are located in Mariehamn on the Åland Islands. The Swedish head office occupies six floors of the classic property Stureplan 19, built in 1893–1895, in central Stockholm.

== Ratings ==
The Bank of Aland been rated by Moody's Ratings in A3/ P-2 for long- and short-term deposits.

== Ratios ==
- Revenue: EUR 202.30 million (2023)
- Net operating profit: EUR 61.7 million (2023)
- Total assets: EUR 9.776 billion (2023)
- Risk-based capital ratio: 12.8% (2008)
- Return on equity: 10.7% (2008)
- Employees: 700+ (2009)
- Offices: 30

== See also ==
- List of banks in Finland
