= Postipankki =

Former Finnish bank

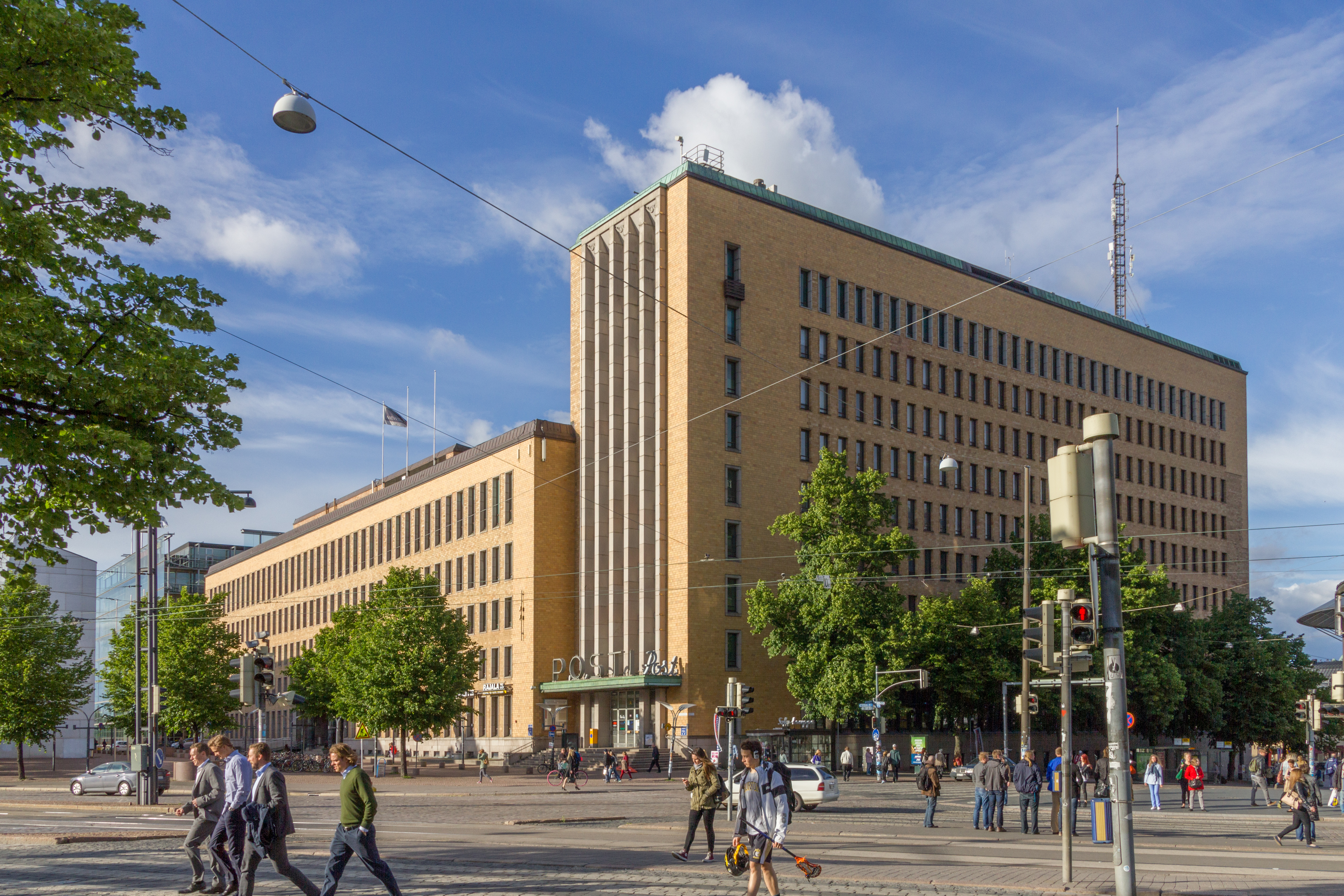
The Post Office building in Helsinki, home of the Postal Bank from completion in 1938 to 1955

The Finnish Postal Bank, in Finnish Postipankki, established in 1887 and known from 1997 to 2007 as Leonia Bank (Leonia Pankki) then Sampo Bank (Sampo Pankki), was a significant bank in Finland. For more than a century it operated Finland's postal savings system, then developed into an independent financial institution, shed its postal identity in 1997, and expanded aggressively in the Baltic countries and Russia. It was eventually acquired in 2007 by Danske Bank, thus becoming Danske Bank Finland.

== Postal Bank ==
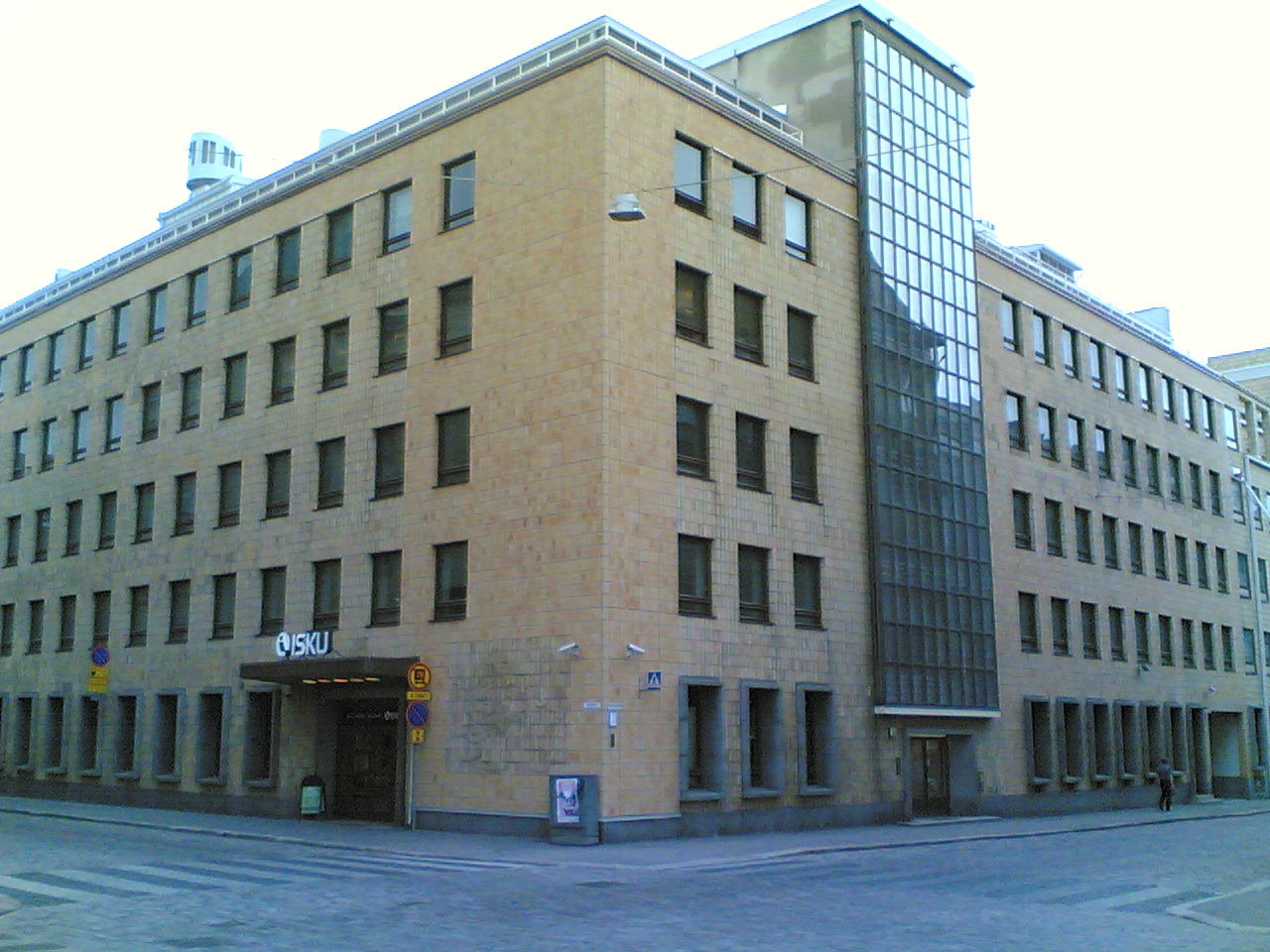
Postisäästöpankki head office on Fabianinkatu 23, designed by architect Antero Pernaja and completed in 1955

In 1887, Postisäästöpankki (lit. 'Postal Savings Bank') was established as the financial arm of the national Finnish post office, which accepted deposits from the public at post offices. In 1970, it was renamed Postipankki (lit. 'Post Bank'). In 1988, it became a full-service bank, organized as a state-owned limited company.

== Leonia Bank ==
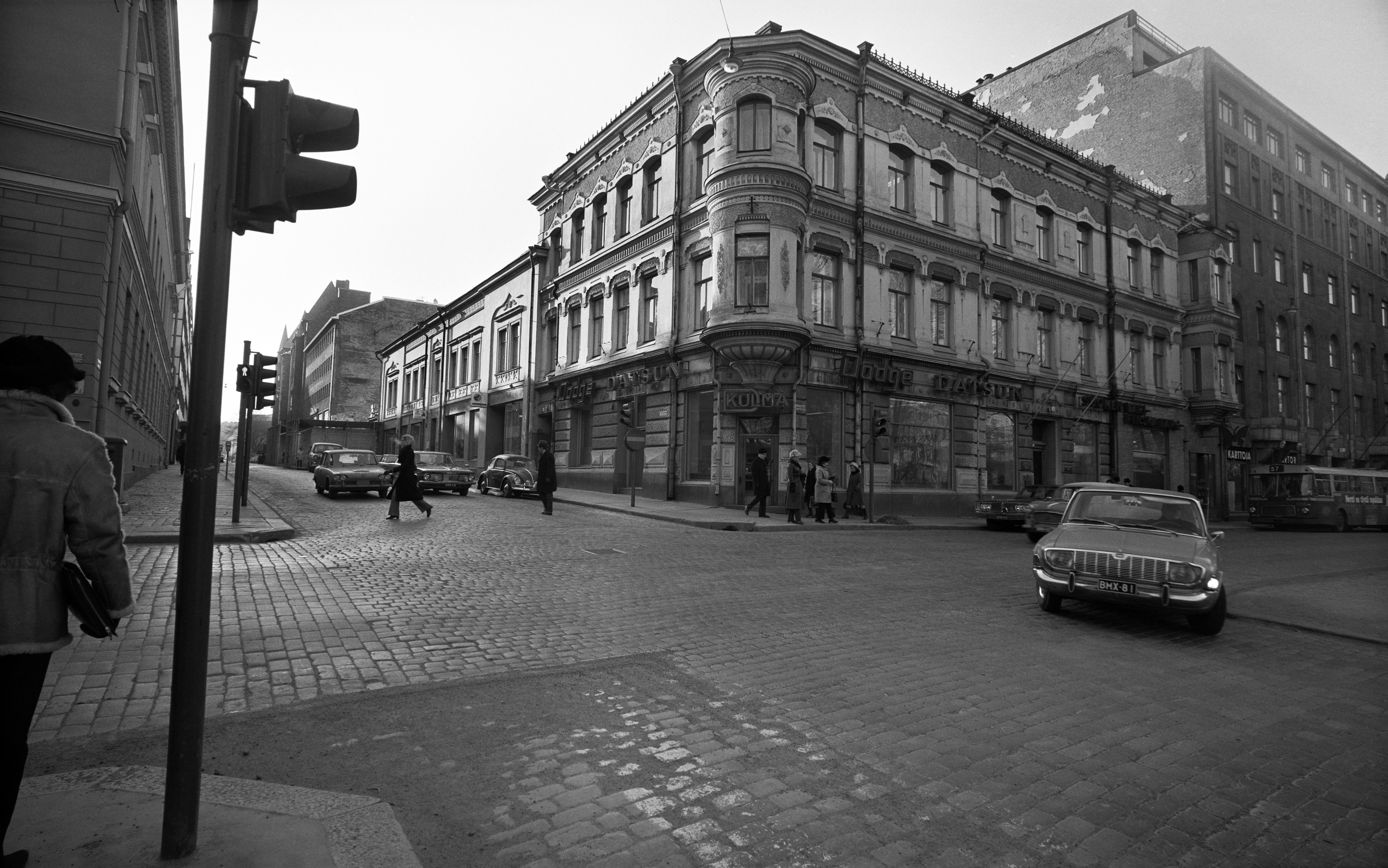
Building at Eteläesplanadi 8 in Helsinki, head office of Finnish Export Credit from 1973 to 1997

In 1997, Postipankki absorbed Suomen Vientiluotto (lit. 'Finnish Export Credit'), a joint venture between the Finnish state (majority shareholder) and the country's main financial institutions. The resulting entity was rebranded Leonia Pankki. In 2000, Sampo Group acquired Leonia Pankki. Also in 2000, the group acquired Lietuvos Vystymo bankas (Lithuanian Development Bank, established in 1994) in Lithuania and Optiva Bank in Estonia. Optiva had been formed in 1998 by merger of Eesti Forekspank (est. 1992), Raepank (est. 1995) and Eesti Investeerimispank (EstIB).

== Sampo Bank ==
In 2001, Sampo's banking operations were rebranded as Sampo Bank. That same year, Sampo acquired Mandatum Bank, created in 1998 by a merger of Interbank Osakepankki (established in 1988) and Mandatum & Co. (established in 1992).

In 2004, Sampo Bank acquired Maras Banka, an Estonian bank established in 1996. In 2006, Sampo Bank acquired the Industry and Finance Bank (known as Profibank) in Russia.

== Danske Bank Finland ==
In 2007, Sampo Group sold Sampo Bank to Danske Bank, while retaining its insurance business. At just over €4 billion, it was the largest cash acquisition to date in Finland. On 15 November 2012, Sampo Bank was renamed Danske Bank after banking operations were uniformed under one brand. Danske Bank Finland was further reorganized as a branch in late 2017.

== Buildings ==
From 1945 on, Postisäästöpankki built up offices on the southern side of the urban block bordered by Esplanadi, Fabianinkatu, Pohjoinen Makasiinikatu, and Unioninkatu in Helsinki, including the southern wing designed by architect Antero Pernaja and completed in 1955. Sampo Group moved its head office into the complex after buying Leonia Bank, then left, and returned to part of it (Fabianinkatu 19 / Unioninkatu 22) in 2024.

Following its purchase by Danske Bank, the bank moved its head office to Hiililaiturinkuja 2 in Ruoholahti, then in the 2010s to Televisiokatu 1 in Pasila.

== See also ==
- List of banks in Finland
