= Handelsbanken =

Nordic bank

Svenska Handelsbanken AB

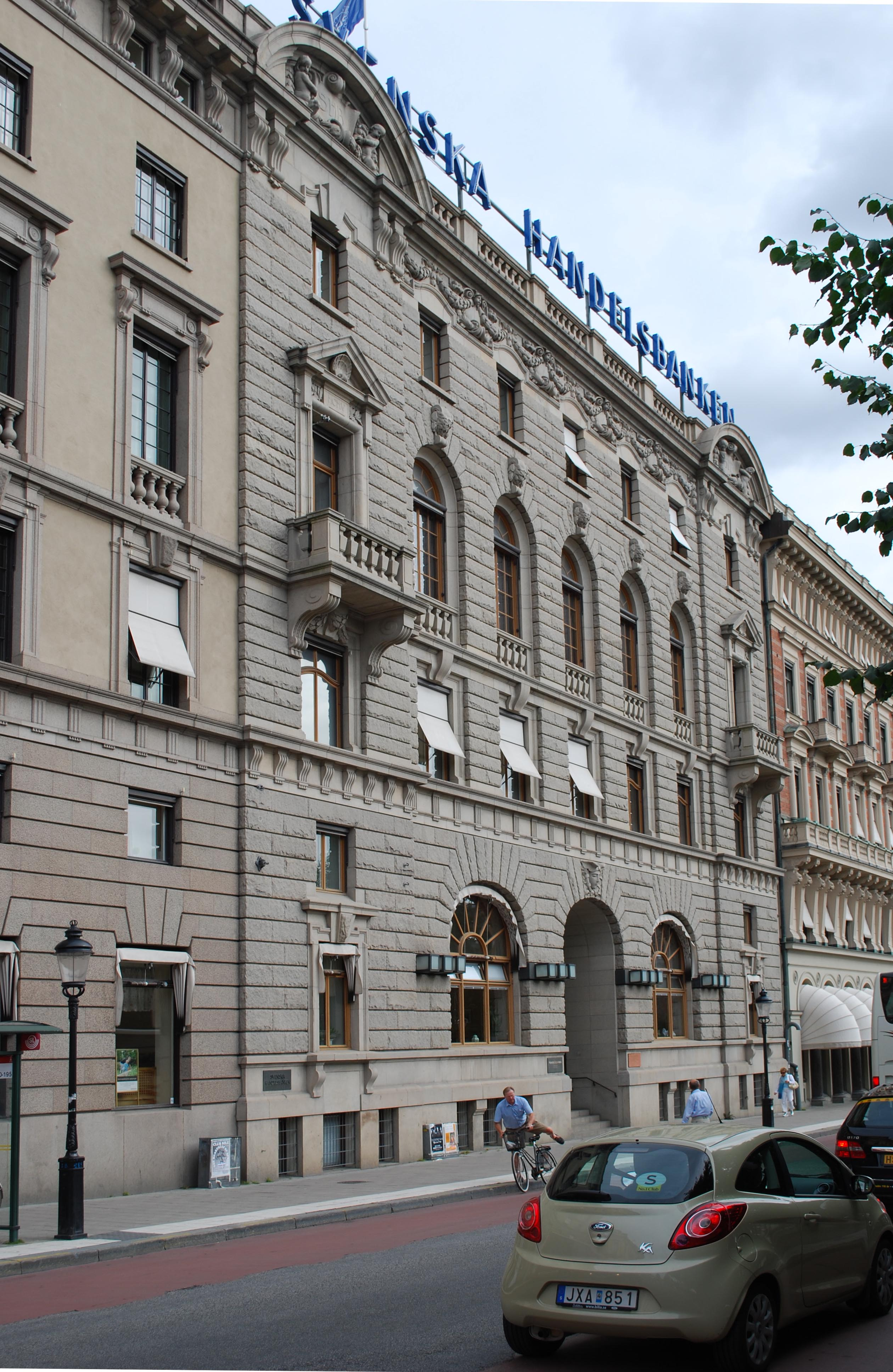
- Handelsbanken's HQ in Stockholm, Sweden
- Type: Publicly traded Aktiebolag
- Traded as: Nasdaq Stockholm: SHB A; OMXS30 component
- ISIN: SE0007100599; SE0007100607
- Industry: Financial services
- Founded: 1 July 1871; 155 years ago
- Headquarters: Stockholm, Sweden
- Area served: Sweden, Norway, Netherlands, and UK
- Key people: Pär Boman (Chairman); Michael Green (President and Group CEO)
- Products: Banking and insurance
- Revenue: ▲43.35 billion kr (2021)
- Operating income: ▲23.48 billion kr (2021)
- Net income: ▲19.54 billion kr (2021)
- Total assets: ▲3.35 trillion kr (2021)
- Total equity: ▲181.73 billion kr (2021)
- Number of employees: 10,793 (Dec 2021)
- Rating: AA (Fitch Ratings)
- Website: www.handelsbanken.com

Svenska Handelsbanken AB is a Nordic bank with international operations, providing a comprehensive range of financial services including corporate banking, investment banking, trading, and consumer banking such as loans, savings, and insurance. Headquartered in Sweden, Handelsbanken has a strong nationwide branch network and maintains a significant presence in other key markets including Norway, the Netherlands, and the United Kingdom, where it operates with a focus on decentralised decision-making and long-term customer relationships.

Since the mid-1990s Handelsbanken has been expanding its universal banking operations into the other Nordic countries, and also in the United Kingdom and the Netherlands. The largest of these is in Britain with more than 150 branch offices. In October 2021 Handelsbanken announced that it would focus on its main markets Britain, Sweden and Norway and sell its operations in Finland and Denmark.

== History ==
=== Founding as Stockholms Handelsbank ===
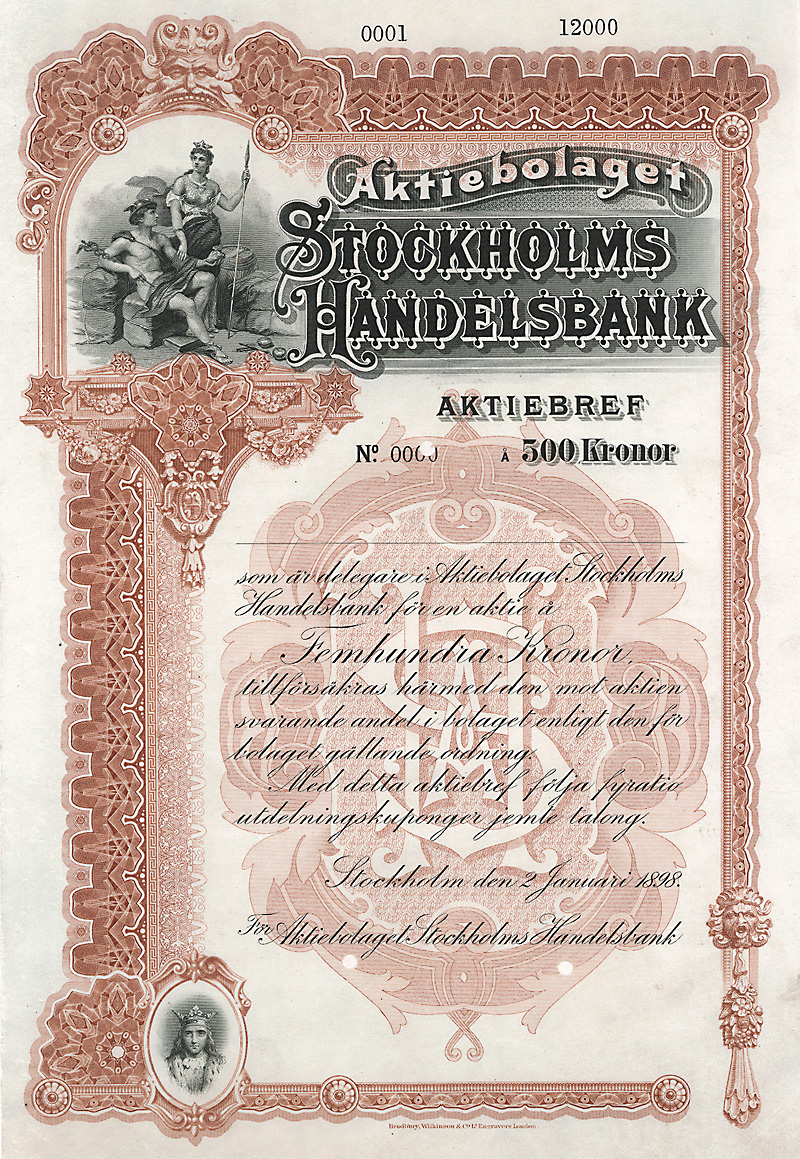
Specimen of the AB Stockholms Handelsbank from 2 January 1898

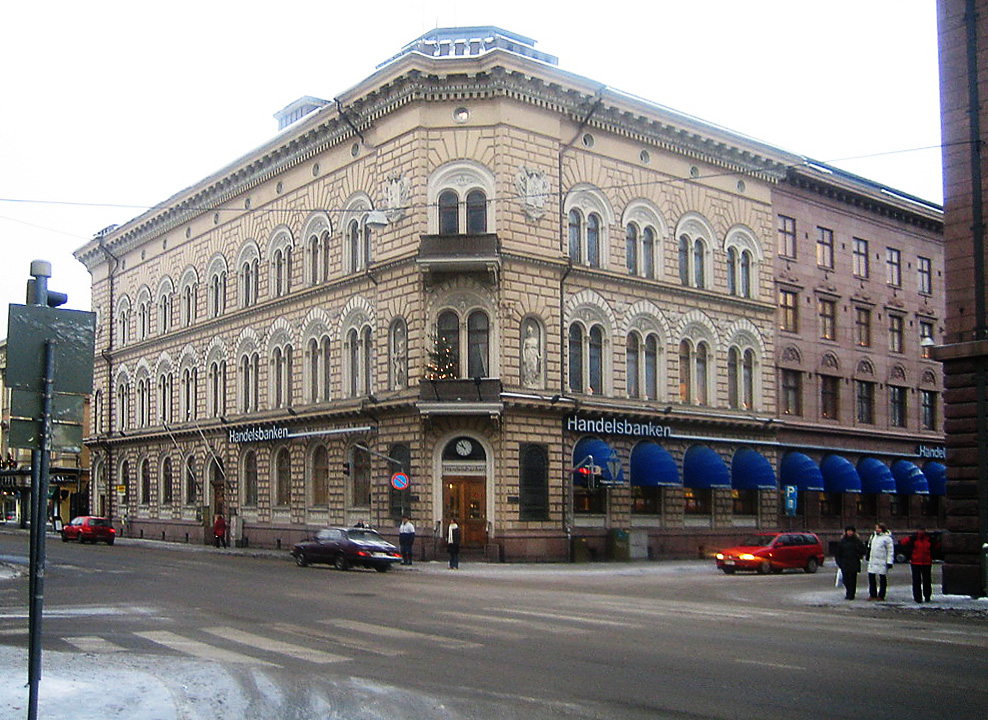
The Market Square branch of Handelsbanken in Turku, Finland.

Stockholms Handelsbank ("Stockholm Commerce Bank") was created in early 1871 by several large corporations and leading Stockholm residents. Several of the initial owners had been active in Stockholms enskilda bank, the forerunner of SEB, which had opened in 1856 as the first private bank of Stockholm, and left that bank in April 1871 after a conflict. Handelsbanken began operating 1 July 1871 in rented space in the commercial and financial district in the central Old Town. The bank's first year was quite successful and soon, it was one of the city's financial institutions, functioning as a bank for businesses and also as an issuer of bonds. In 1873, the shares in Handelsbanken were listed on the Stockholm Stock Exchange.

In 1887, the bank entered into a crisis due to considerable losses, but was able to pull through. In 1893, the banking company of Louis Frænckel was fused with Stockholms Handelsbank, with Frænckel as the CEO. Under Frænckel's tenure, which lasted until his death in 1911, the bank was expanded with a notary department in 1896 and by a securities trading department in 1899. It also developed contacts with many foreign banks and financial institutions, which led to the buildup of trading activities in foreign currencies. The merge of the Julius Geber & Co banking company into Handelsbanken in 1906 contributed to its prominence in the Swedish foreign exchange market.

From 1914 to 1917, Stockholm's Handelsbank bought several smaller Swedish regional banks, and was in a short time transformed from a purely Stockholm-based bank to a bank with a large number of branch offices (38 in 1914 and 143 in 1917) throughout Sweden, in particular central and northern Sweden. In 1918, new branches were opened in Gothenburg and Malmö to get better national coverage, and in 1919, a bank in southern Sweden was bought, which brought the number of branch offices to over 250. After this expansion, the name was changed to Svenska Handelsbanken ("Swedish Commerce Bank") on 15 November 1919.

=== 1920–1945 ===
Following the post–World War I recession, Sweden experienced deflation, which caused considerable problems for the financial sector. In 1922, Handelsbanken failed to show a profit for the first time in its existence and in 1922–1923 it consolidated its activities, and made some write-downs, reductions in dividends and reserved funds to cover losses. The second half of the 1920s were much better times for the bank. In 1926, Mälarebanken was fused into Handelsbanken, bringing the number of branch offices to 270, of which 28 in Stockholm.

The worldwide depression following the Wall Street crash of 1929 led to reduced profits, and problems for borrowers resulted in the bank taking over stock in several industrial companies to secure their loans. Handelsbanken had however been cautious in their relation to Ivar Kreuger and his financial empire so it was not much affected by the Kreuger crash following Kreuger's death in 1932. Handelsbanken did however expand its ownership in Svenska Cellulosa Aktiebolaget (SCA) as a result of the crash.

In the winter of 1943/1944, Handelsbanken formed a holding company for the companies owned by the bank after the financial problems of the 1920s and 1930s, as part of a plan to phase out the bank's ownership of these companies, which included L. M. Ericsson. The company was named Industrivärden ("The Industry Host" or "Industry Values"), and after the bank's shareholders had been given the opportunity to acquire shares in the holding company, it was listed on the Stockholm Stock Exchange in 1945.

=== 1945–1970 ===
Handelsbanken continued to expand by purchasing other banks in the 1940s and 1950s – Vänersborgsbanken, Norrköpings Folkbank, Luleå Folkbank and Gotlandsbanken. The mortgage company SIGAB was acquired in 1955 and renamed to Handelsbanken Hypotek. In the 1955 to 1965 period, 157 new branch offices were opened, many of these in the newly built suburbs of Stockholm, in order to increase the number of customers and to expand deposits.

Towards the end of the 1960s, the Swedish society saw increased socialist sentiments, just like many other European countries. This was particularly strong among students and other youth, and banks and industrialists in general were portrayed in a very negative way. During this time, Handelsbanken was also the subject of specific criticism from media and authorities, including foreign exchange transactions in 1969 that contravened regulations. The resulting crisis led to the resignation of the bank's management, including CEO Rune Höglund in 1970.

=== 1970–1990 ===
After the resignation of the previous management, Jan Wallander was recruited as the bank's new CEO. Wallander had a background as an economic researcher who had later become CEO of Sundsvallsbanken, a regional bank in northern Sweden. Under Wallander's leadership, many changes were introduced which have continued to be characteristic of Handelsbanken since that time. During 1970–1972, Handelsbanken created eight regional banks with a high degree of independence, to which the branch offices belonged. Much of the decision making was decentralised to the local and regional level, and the financial management and control system was overhauled, by focusing more on reporting and less on central budgeting. The new organisation focused on achieving profitability rather than on volume growth, which had been the case in the 1950s and 1960s.

In 1973, a particular form of profit sharing scheme was introduced. When Handelsbanken meets its goals of higher return on equity than the average of the other listed Swedish banks, a profit share is paid to a foundation named Oktogonen, which keeps its fund entirely in Handelsbanken shares. Payment only takes place after retirement, which means that all employees are interested in securing the long-term profitability of the bank. Oktogonen owns around 10 per cent of Handelsbanken's shares.

In 1970, Handelsbanken installed its first six automated teller machines (ATMs), initially as a trial.

In 1985, many aspects of the Swedish financial sector were deregulated which led to a considerable credit expansion in the following years. Handelsbanken's volume of loans doubled in three years in the end of the 1980s. Skånska Banken and its 76 branch offices was acquired in 1990.

=== 1990–present ===
In 1990, Sweden entered a severe financial crisis, which was compounded by the credit expansion of the late 1980s and a financial bubble related to real estate prices. Many of the Swedish banks were hit hard by this crisis and had to be rescued by the government, which led to some of the banks being temporarily nationalised. Handelsbanken was least affected of the major Swedish banks, and was able to expand its market share in the 1990s. In 1997, Handelsbanken bought Stadshypotek, a major mortgage company, from the government.

In the 1980s Handelsbanken opened several branch offices in other countries mostly to support corporate banking activities. From 1990, several smaller Norwegian, Finnish and Danish banks were acquired to build up Handelsbanken's activities and branch networks in the other Nordic countries. In 1998, Handelsbanken's operations in Denmark, Finland and Norway were organised into regional banks, and started to operate in the same way as the regional bank organisation used by Handelsbanken in Sweden since the 1970s.

In late 1991, the bank introduced telephone banking services and on 10 December 1997 online banking followed.

In 1995, Handelsbanken acquired the vast majority of the credit and financing portfolio of the former Finnish SKOP Bank (fi; which went bust in the early-1990s Finnish banking crisis and the recession that followed), as well as SKOP's holdings in the Industrialization Fund of Finland Ltd (fi:Teollistamisrahasto).

In 1999, Handelsbanken decided to expand in the United Kingdom by organic growth. At that time the bank had three offices in the UK and opened a fourth in 2000. In 2007, the bank opened its 50th UK branch office, and in 2011 its 100th UK branch office. In 2002, the UK operations were organised as a regional bank, in the same way as the bank's Nordic operations.

On 19 October 2021 Handelsbanken announced that it will sell its operations in Finland and Denmark and exit the two markets. Of Handelsbanken's total turnover, Finland and Denmark accounted for 10% from the beginning of 2021, but the share of expenses rose to 13%. Finnish and Danish operations generated 8% of the revenue. The main markets, Sweden, Norway and the UK, accounted for 91%.

On 15 June 2022 Handelsbanken confirmed it was in discussion with Jyske Bank for the acquisition of Handelsbanken's Danish operations.

On 31 May 2023 S-Bank announced to acquire the Finnish private customer, asset management and investment services operations of Handelsbanken.

== Subsidiaries and branches ==
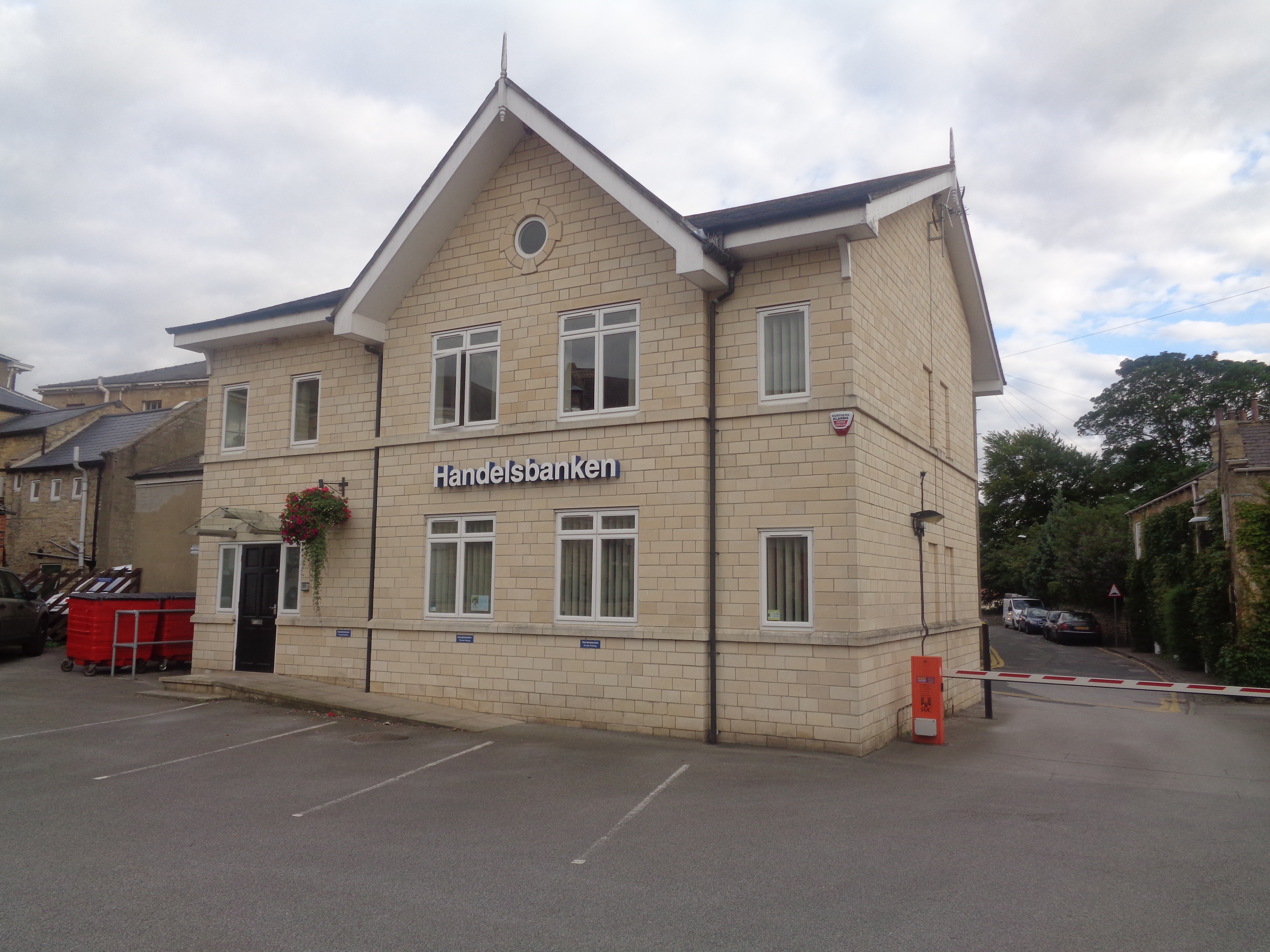
Handelsbanken's branch office in Wetherby, England.

Home markets:

- Sweden
- Norway
- Netherlands
- United Kingdom

International network:

- Luxembourg
- United States – New York City

== See also ==
- List of banks in Sweden
