= Finnish Workers' Savings Bank =

Finnish bank

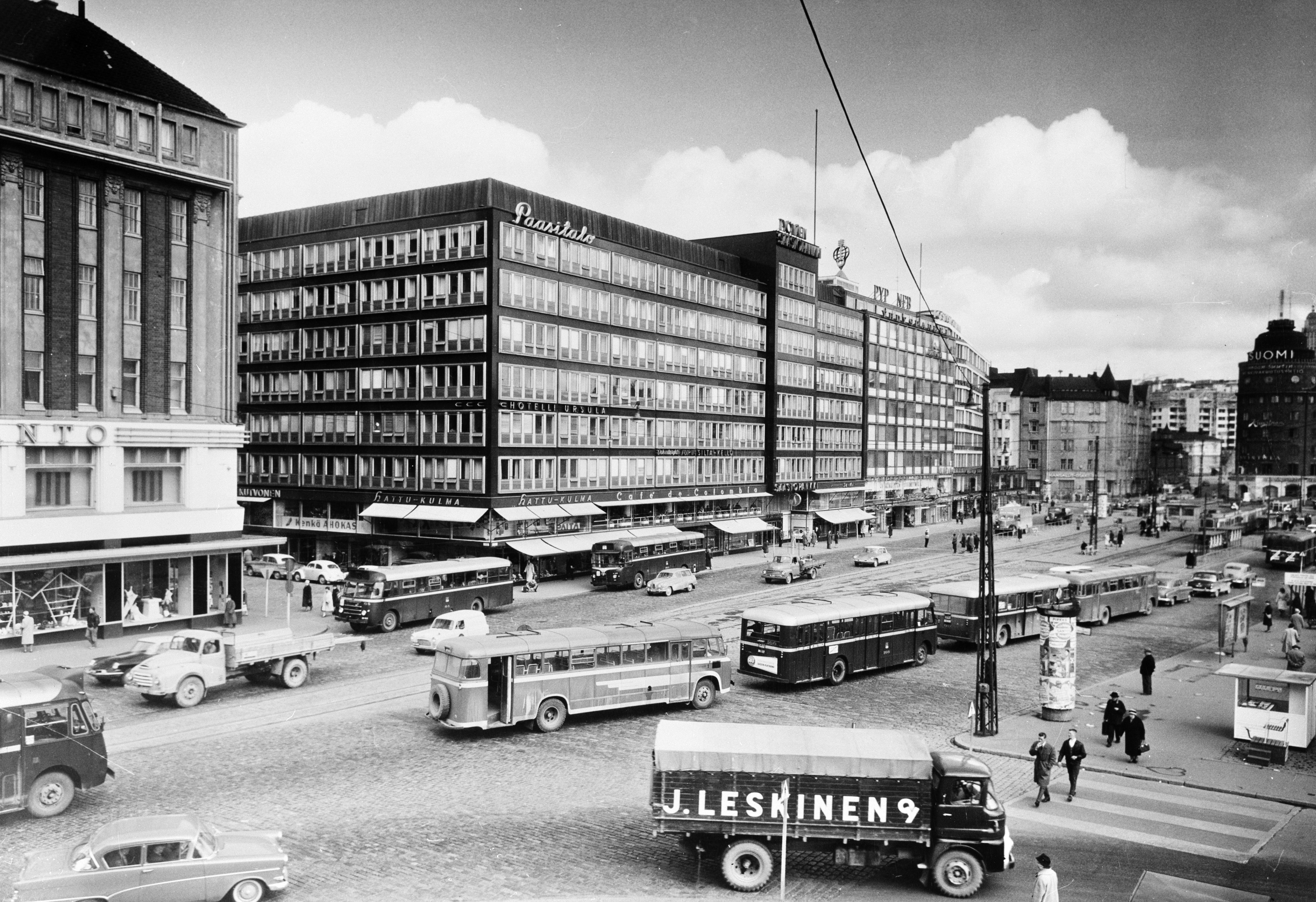
The Paasitalo in Hakaniemi, Helsinki were STS Bank headquarters in 1958-1992.

National Workers' Savings Bank (1971-1989) (In Finnish; Suomen Työväen Säästöpankki, in Swedish; Arbetarsparbanken) or STS-Bank (1989-1992) was a Finnish savings bank and commercial bank. Workers' savings banks were syndicalist, social democratic corporations intended to compete with privately owned banks, which could deny credit to workers on political grounds. Created in 1971 through a merger of five local workers' savings banks, the oldest component of STS was the Helsinki branch, founded in 1909. The Turku workers' savings bank was the only one to choose to stay independent. With the merger, STS became the largest savings bank in Finland. The bank went almost bankrupt in 1992 and was sold at a loss to KOP (later Nordea), with the government taking care of much of the bad debt.

In 1899, the Finnish Worker's Party (later SDP) decided in its general meeting to establish a bank. The Helsinki TS, was founded in 1908 by Albin Karjalainen, the financial officer of the party organ. The main motivation were the problems encountered with the finances of the party organ and building a house for the society. Both required loans, but commercial banks refused to lend for political reasons. For much of its history, it functioned efficiently as a savings bank with a working class (principally construction workers) clientele. President of Finland Mauno Koivisto was the CEO of STS in 1959-1968.

The "casino economy" craze of the late 1980s caught on also at STS. In 1989, the bank was transformed into a commercial bank, and foundations controlled by the leftist political parties SDP and SKP bought shares, intending to fund their activities with the profits of the bank. However, loose credit policies and the subsequent credit loss due to the early 1990s recession were disastrous for the bank. Esko Seppänen has opined that STS had become a sort of a "cash dispenser" from which clients could get cash without any strict payback obligation. As much as 40% of the loans were given against the bank's own policies, and 22% had indications of deliberate abuse. STS was one of the main contributors to the early 1990s banking crisis in Finland, where the country was at the brink of a banking system and economic collapse. In 1992, in addition to the official loss of 500 million markka (Mmk), concealed was 740 Mmk bad debt, 700 Mmk asset overvaluation and 300 Mmk miscellaneous losses. Furthermore, STS had borrowed ½ billion to the cooperative retailer EKA and the construction company Haka, both bound for bankruptcy. An assetless shell, Siltapankki Oy, remained with the bad debt. Facing bankruptcy, the remaining parts were sold in 1992 to another major bank, Kansallis-Osake-Pankki, which took over the operations and terminated its independent brand and existence. The owning foundation received only 75 million markka in the form of KOP shares (itself ripe for bankruptcy), thus leading to an immediate loss of 175 million markka (ca. 30 million euro). The government merged Siltapankki with the bad bank Arsenal in 1995. All savings customers were fully refunded. The total cost to taxpayers was ca. 2 billion Finnish markka (around 0.5 billion in 2010 euros) according to Esko Seppänen.

The last CEO of the bank was Ulf Sundqvist, a prominent SDP politician and the party president in 1991-1993. The allegations and protracted court cases due to the STS collapse damaged his career, preventing ascendancy to prime minister. Sundquist was eventually convicted of debtor's dishonesty (a felony of hiding assets from creditors), with his appeal denied by the Supreme Court in 2001. The minister involved on behalf of the government, Arja Alho, was forced to resign for negotiating the settlement poorly. Other involved members of the board were given no opportunity to settle, and if the same standard had been applied to Sundquist, he would have been ordered to pay 5.7 million instead of 1.8 million in damages.

The modern successor of KOP and thus STS is Nordea. The holding foundation still exists as Palkansaajasäätiö, which maintains the STS museum.

== CEOs ==
- Jonas Laherma - 1916–1959
- Mauno Koivisto - 1959–1968
- Ulf Sundqvist - 1982–1991
- Yrjö-Olavi Aav - 1991-1992

== See also ==
- List of banks in Finland
