= 1990s Finnish banking crisis =

Financial crisis in Finland

The 1990s Finnish banking crisis was a deep systemic crisis of the entire Finnish financial sector that took place mainly in the years 1991–1993, after several years of debt-based economic boom in the late 1980s. Its total taxpayer cost was roughly 8% of the Finnish GNP, making it the most severe of the contemporary Nordic banking crises. The crisis has been attributed to a combination of macro-economic turbulence, weak regulation, and bank-specific problems. Governmental intervention included bank takeovers, direct monetary assistance and temporary blanket guarantees to the banks.

== Background ==
Until the 1980s, the Finnish financial market was tightly regulated: the Bank of Finland controlled interest rates, foreign exchange rates, and import and export of currency. High interest rates caused a chronic excess in potential demand vs. available supply of debt. Thus, interest rates were relatively high (Helibor ca. 10–15%), the so-called Suomi-lisä "Finland surcharge" versus foreign less regulated markets.

In the early 1980s, most of the financial market was deregulated, leading to a massive credit expansion largely based on foreign debt. The soaring stock and real estate prices attracted frantic speculative activity by banks, private companies and individual investors. The banks aggressively expanded their borrowing in foreign currency, including even banks such as Osuuspankki or the Finnish Savings Banks Group, which had not done so earlier. The late 1980s is therefore colloquially known in Finland as kasinotalous ("casino economy").

== Banks became speculators ==
The banks started actively participating in profit-seeking high-risk operations such as company takeovers and foreign investment in which they had little experience.

The most active role was played by savings banks and their mutually-owned central institution the Finnish Savings Banks Group (SKOP), which wanted to break free from the "old-fashioned" retail banking business. Some of SKOP's operations were very large compared to the bank's equity, and would later cause great losses: in 1987 it acquired Tampella, a Finnish heavy industry manufacturer that went bankrupt in 1990, and in 1988, it granted 400 million Finnish markka of credit to a Virgin Islands hotel project.

SKOP's strategy was to use massive short-term credit, which was readily available from the money market, to finance its operations and long-term investments on the stock market and in corporate loans. That was often highly profitable during the boom, but also caused increasing losses when interest rates rose (the Helibor exceeded 15% at times), the stock market turned down, and debtors started defaulting on their loans. SKOP Director Christopher Wegelius, was charged but was cleared of charges after a lengthy process. He was a key witness in the trial that resulted in the impeachment and conviction of Minister of Trade and Industry Kauko Juhantalo of corruption.

Another bank that collapsed was the Finnish Workers' Savings Bank (STS), another savings bank central joint venture. With approval by STS management, well-connected trade union and socialist party politicians could borrow money without criteria and reinvest in various ventures, many of which ultimately failed. Notable STS-owned established businesses collapsed, including EKA, a retail store chain, and Haka, a construction company. Ulf Sundqvist, the chairman of the Social Democratic Party of Finland until his resignation in 1993, was held financially responsible for the loose policies that contributed to the downfall of STS, along with other members of the board. His failure to pay the compensation led to a conviction of debtor's dishonesty. Sundqvist became a personification of the crisis.

== Culmination ==
On several occasions during 1990, SKOP had to resort to overnight debt from the Bank of Finland to cover its liquidity position, as it was unable to raise sufficient funds from the interbank market.

SKOP's liquidity position finally collapsed on 19 September 1991, when other banks would not buy its money market debt papers at all. The Bank of Finland took over the control of SKOP and bought the majority of its shares.

Bad debt was stripped from STS and transferred to the government's bad bank, Omaisuudenhoitoyhtiö Arsenal, and the remaining parts were sold to another major bank, Kansallis-Osake-Pankki (KOP) which absorbed them completely.

== Government intervention and aftermath ==
In 1992, to stabilize the financial sector and to prevent a credit crunch, the government gave a 7.1 billion markka (€1.2 billion), initially zero-interest, convertible loan to Finnish banks. Most of the banks (with the notable exception of SKOP) later paid back the loan.

A special state-funded Government Guarantee Fund (Valtion vakuusrahasto) was also set up to support the savings banks, many of which were first consolidated and then broken up; the healthy parts were sold to commercial banks. Ownership of defaulted or nonperforming assets was transferred to a bad bank, Omaisuudenhoitoyhtiö Arsenal. The government founded the company Sponda to manage the property obtained as collateral. Unlike Arsenal, which was gradually wound down, Sponda was gradually privatised and continues today as a private company.

The total public expenditure in support of the banks has been estimated as roughly 50 billion FIM (€8.4 billion), the vast majority of which was spent on the savings banks.

Commercial banks raised capital from their stockholders to cover their losses. The two largest Finnish commercial banks, Suomen Yhdyspankki and Kansallis-Osake-Pankki, merged in 1995 to become Merita Bank, later Nordea.

== Key people involved ==
- Mauno Koivisto, President of Finland and the architect of the "strong markka" policy
- Esko Aho, Prime Minister during the crisis
- Iiro Viinanen, Minister of Finance, architect of the financial policies applied, including subsequent austerity
- Christopher Wegelius, CEO and chairman of the board of SKOP
- Kauko Juhantalo, Minister of Trade and Industry, convicted for taking bribes from Wegelius and expelled from Parliament
- Ulf Sundqvist, CEO of STS Bank and party president of the Social Democratic Party of Finland

== See also ==
- Helibor
- List of banking crises
