= 2008–2009 Ukrainian financial crisis =

Economic decline caused by the Great Recession

Ukraine's real GDP growth rate per year, 1990–2011

Ukraine was one of the countries with the most negative GDP growth in 2009

Ukraine was hit heavily by the Great Recession, the World Bank expected Ukraine's economy to shrink 15% in 2009 with inflation having been 16.4%.

The deficit of Ukraine's foreign trade in goods and services January through September 2009 was estimated at $1.08 billion, which was 9.5 times down on the same period in 2008, export of goods over the period decreased by 48.7%, to $27.478 billion, while imports fell by 53.5%, to $31.570 billion; export of services dropped by 23.2%, to $6.841 billion, while imports were down by 19.9%, to $3.829 billion (the deficit of Ukraine's foreign trade over the first nine months of 2008 was estimated at $10.284 billion, which was 2.7 times up on the same period of 2007).

According to a forecast by the State Employment Centre, unemployment in Ukraine would triple to 9% in 2009 (there was 3% unemployment at the end of 2008), which would mean about 3 million people would apply for employment services. In September 2009, the official level of unemployment was 1.9%. 95% of the population of Ukraine had felt the influence of the 2008 financial crisis; in July 2009 21% of them stated that "The crisis has a catastrophic impact on me and my family", this figure dropped to 17% in October 2009. Actual year-on-year wages in Ukraine fell in October 2009 by 10.9%, while in October 2008, it grew by 4.8% year-over-year according to the State Statistics Committee of Ukraine. The real incomes for Ukrainians in 2009 fell down 8.5% while the nominal income went up 6.2%. The Ukrainian economy shrank 15 percent in 2009. The second Tymoshenko Government had predicted GDP growth of 0.4% in 2009 and a slowdown in inflation to 9.5% (also in 2009), although the overwhelming majority of economists considered this forecast to be excessively optimistic.

The Ukrainian economy recovered in the first quarter of 2010.

== Reasons for crisis ==
Analysts say the reasons for the crises were slumping steel prices, local banking problems and the cutting of Russian gas supply of January 2009. This made key industries such as metallurgy and machine building lay off workers, and real wages started to fall for the first time in a decade.

In 2008 the hryvnia dropped 38% against the US dollar, eclipsed only by the Icelandic krona and the Seychelles rupee. Since many loans and mortgages were issued in dollars and most Ukrainians are paid in hryvnias (Ukraine's currency), they had to buy dollars with the weak hryvnya, and so they were paying back much more on the loans than they had expected. From December 2008 till mid-May 2009 Ukrainian banks were not allowed to grant requests for early withdrawals of bank deposits. As of September 2009 financial analysts predict a recovery of the hryvnia.

According to David Heslam of Fitch ratings "At the root of the problem is Ukraine's inconsistent macroeconomic policy framework, as the authorities are aiming to defend the exchange rate while avoiding necessary fiscal tightening in the absence of adequate sources of non-monetary financing".

In November 2009, Ukraine's Minister of Economics Bohdan Danylyshyn stated that in his view the "permanent conflicts" and "lack of understanding" between the National Bank of Ukraine (NBU) and the Cabinet of Ministers was one of major factors of the deep fall of the Ukrainian GDP in 2009, as in his view the conflicts affected the efficiency of the anti-crisis policies of Ukraine (he also insists government should get involved in NBU's activity).

Asked in August and October 2009 "Who bears the most responsibility for the difficult socioeconomic situation in Ukraine?" about a half of all Ukrainians polled (47%) answered President of Ukraine Viktor Yushchenko, and 22% blamed Prime Minister of Ukraine Yulia Tymoshenko, while 17% of the respondents thought that the Verkhovna Rada was also responsible for the lack of progress in solving economic problems.

== Crises per year ==
=== 2008 ===
The share of problem loans in bank portfolios grew to 10.3 percent by 11 December 2008 and is continuing to grow. Banks have all but stopped issuing loans, and clients have hurried to withdraw deposits. In October 2008, the National Bank of Ukraine introduced a moratorium on withdrawals ahead of schedule. Industrial output in November 2008 tumbled 28.6 percent, following a 19.8 decline in October 2008. Steel production slumped 48.8 percent, oil refining and chemical output fell 35.2 percent and machine building by 38.8 percent. Ukraine's economy shrunk 14.4 percent year-on-year in November 2008. Statistical data showed the gross domestic product (GDP) growth slowed to 3.6 percent in January–November compared to 5.8 percent in January–October. Ukraine's Economy Ministry expects the economy to grow 3.5-4.0 percent in 2008. The Hryvnia also lost value.

According to a poll (held 25 November through 5 December 2008) by the Horshenin Institute of Management Problems about 79% of those polled suffered from rise in prices, about 29% from delays in payment of salaries. More than some 20% have suffered from reduction of salaries. In the families of some 14.8% somebody lost their job, and some 6% said their enterprise shut down. A total of 90.8% of those polled described their financial state as "making both ends meet" and 83.1% said they are short of money for food. Only 2.4% of Ukrainians said they were not hit by the economic crisis at all.

Mid-December 2008 the International Monetary Fund (IMF) has lowered the forecast for Ukraine's GDP in 2009 from a 2.5% growth rate to a 5% decline, the same day the Cabinet of Ministers worsened the GDP growth forecast to 0.4% from 6% for 2009.

In November 2008, the IMF approved a stand-by loan program for Ukraine to the tune of $16.5 billion. A second one worth $1.87 billion might be granted in February 2009.

In November 2008, the official unemployment rate increased by 0.4 percent to 2.3 (Previously 1.9% in September), the State Statistics Committee said that as of 1 December 2008, it registered 640,000 unemployed people.

=== 2009 ===
Ukraine's banking system recorded losses of ₴7 billion (UAH) ($909 million) in the first quarter of 2009 compared to a profit of ₴2.1 billion in the same period a year ago, according to a central bank report of 22 April 2009. In April 2009 the IMF forecast an 8.0 percent shrink of the Ukrainian economy in 2009 and a 1.0 percent grow in 2010. In Mid-April 2009, Ceyla Pazarbasioglu, the IMF mission chief in Ukraine, stated that there were a number of encouraging signs that Ukraine's economy had started to adjust to the global crisis. According to Olena Belan, analyst at Dragon Capital, "that is a good signal for investors, showing that Ukraine is taking anti-crisis measures and the economic situation is under control." Foreign direct investment did plunge 66% (to $2.7 billion) in the first half of 2009.

On 18 May 2009 Ukraine's State Statistics Committee reported that the deficit of Ukraine's foreign trade in the first quarter of 2009 was estimated at $419.7 million, which was 9 times down on the same period the previous year.

The Ukrainian state became the de facto owner of Ukrhazbank (84.21% after investing ₴3.2 billion), Rodovid Bank (99.97% after investing ₴2.809 billion) and Bank Kyiv (99.93% after investing ₴3.563 billion) early June 2009.

The industrial output of Ukraine in the period January–August 2009 shrank by 29.6% compared to the same period in 2008. The fall in Ukraine's industrial output slowed to 26.7% in July 2009 compared to July 2008, compared to a fall of 27.5% in June and 31.8% in April and May 2009 (compared to 2008 again).

On 17 September 2009 the World Bank approved a loan for Ukraine in the amount of $400 million.

According to a public opinion poll conducted by FOM-Ukraine in September/October 2009 46.2% of those polled thought that the economic situation in the country would worsen within the next few months, while 35% stated that the economic situation in Ukraine would remain unchanged and 8% thought the situation would improve.

On 1 November 2009 the International Monetary Fund (IMF) warned that it could cut financial assistance to Ukraine; managing director of the IMF Dominique Strauss-Kahn stated he was “very worried” with President Viktor Yushchenko’s decision to sign a bill adopting wage and pension increases. Prime Minister Yulia Tymoshenko accused Yushchenko and other candidate for the 2010 Ukrainian presidential election of backing the increase to sabotage her government and thereby undercutting her presidential bid.

In late November 2009, acting vice governor of the National Bank of Ukraine Vasyl Pasichnyk forecasted no mass bankruptcies in the Ukrainian banking sector.

=== 2010 ===
Ukraine's total foreign debt (state and corporate) had reached 93.5% of the 912.563 billion Hryvnya GDP in March 2010; late February 2010 the Ukrainian Finance Ministry had reported that the country's total state debt by early 2010 was to 32.9% of the GDP. Standard & Poor's upgraded Ukraine's rating the same day.

18 March 2010 the National Bank of Ukraine stated the total external debt in Ukraine increased 2.3% to $103.973 billion in 2009, and it considered a 4% GDP growth realistic for 2010 the same day.

The Ukrainian economy recovered in the first quarter of 2010 due to stronger-than-expected growth in the global economy, driven primarily by emerging Asia and Latin America, larger social transfers to the population approved in the 2010 budget law and a lower price for imported natural gas (due to the 2010 Ukrainian–Russian Naval Base for Natural Gas treaty).

== See also ==
- Economy of Ukraine
- List of banking crises
