= List of banking crises =

Number of countries having a banking crisis in each year since 1800. This is based on This Time Is Different: Eight Centuries of Financial Folly, which covers only 70 countries. The general upward trend might be attributed to many factors. One of these is a gradual historical increase in the percent of people who receive money for their labor. Another, elsewhere suggested reason related to more recent development trends and to banking crisis during modern era might be changes in the size of banking sector compared to overall GDP. The dramatic feature of this graph is the virtual absence of banking crises during the period of the Bretton Woods agreement, 1945 to 1971. This analysis is similar to Figure 10.1 in Reinhart and Rogoff (2009). For more details see the help file for "bankingCrises" in the Ecdat package available from the Comprehensive R Archive Network (CRAN).

This is a list of banking crises. A banking crisis is a financial crisis that affects banking activity. Banking crises include bank runs, which affect single banks; banking panics, which affect many banks; and systemic banking crises, in which a country experiences many defaults and financial institutions and corporations face great difficulties repaying contracts. A banking crisis is marked by bank runs that lead to the demise of financial institutions, or by the demise of a financial institution that starts a string of similar demises.

== Bank runs ==
A bank run occurs when many bank customers withdraw their deposits because they believe the bank might fail. There have been many runs on individual banks throughout history; for example, some of the 2008–2009 bank failures in the United States were associated with bank runs.

== Banking panics and systemic banking crises ==
=== 17th century ===
- Dutch banking crisis of 1672, Rampjaar financial turmoil. Middelburg bank suspended payments amid wartime runs. The Bank of Amsterdam faced a bank run but remained solvent.

=== 18th century ===
- Bern banking crisis of 1720, the collapse of two Bernese banks (Malacrida and Müller) due to speculative losses tied to the Mississippi and South Sea bubbles.
- Crisis of 1763, started in Amsterdam, begun by the collapse of Johann Ernst Gotzkowsky and Leendert Pieter de Neufville's bank, spread to Germany and Scandinavia
- British credit crisis of 1772-1773 in London and Amsterdam, begun by the collapse of the bankers Neal, James, Fordyce and Down.
- Panic of 1792, New York
- Panic of 1796–1797, Britain and United States

=== 19th century ===
- Panic of 1819, a U.S. recession with bank failures; culmination of U.S.'s first boom-to-bust economic cycle
- Panic of 1825, a pervasive British recession in which many banks failed, nearly including the Bank of England
- Panic of 1837, a U.S. recession with bank failures, followed by a 5-year depression
- Panic of 1847, United Kingdom
- Panic of 1857, a U.S. recession with bank failures
- Panic of 1866, Europe
- Black Friday (1869), a gold panic that triggered a recession in the U.S.
- Panic of 1873, a financial crisis in Europe and the U.S.
- Panic of 1884, United States and Europe
- Panic of 1890, mainly affecting the United Kingdom and Argentina
- Panic of 1893, a U.S. recession with bank failures
- Australian banking crisis of 1893
- Panic of 1896, acute U.S. recession

=== 20th century ===
- Panic of 1901, a U.S. economic recession that started a fight for financial control of the Northern Pacific Railway
- Panic of 1907, a U.S. economic recession with bank failures
- 1919–1922 Philippine financial crisis
- Shōwa Financial Crisis, a 1927 Japanese financial panic that resulted in mass bank failures across the Empire of Japan.
- Great Depression, the worst systemic banking crisis of the 20th century
- Secondary banking crisis of 1973–1975 in the UK
- Japanese asset price bubble (1986–2003)
- Latin American debt crisis in the early 1980s
- Savings and loan crisis of the 1980s and 1990s in the U.S.
- 1988–1992 Norwegian banking crisis
- Finnish banking crisis of 1990s
- Sweden financial crisis 1990–1994
- Rhode Island banking crisis
- Peruvian banking crisis of 1992
- Venezuelan banking crisis of 1994
- 1994 Mexican peso crisis
- 1997 Asian financial crisis
  - Enping financial crisis
- 1998 collapse of Long-Term Capital Management
- 1998 Russian financial crisis
- 1998–2002 Argentine great depression
- 1998–1999 Ecuador economic crisis

=== 21st century ===
- 2002 Uruguay banking crisis
- 2003 Myanmar banking crisis
- 2008 financial crisis, including:

- Subprime mortgage crisis in the U.S. starting in 2007
- 2008 United Kingdom bank rescue package
- 2009 United Kingdom bank rescue package
- 2008–2009 Belgian financial crisis
- 2008–2011 Icelandic financial crisis
- Great Recession in Russia
- 2008–2009 Ukrainian financial crisis
- 2008–2014 Spanish financial crisis
- Post-2008 Irish banking crisis

- Venezuelan banking crisis of 2009–2010
- 2012–2013 Cypriot financial crisis
- Ghana banking crisis of 2017–2018
- 2022 Henan banking crisis
- 2023 United States banking crisis
- 2026 Paraguay banking crisis

== See also ==
- List of economic crises
- List of bank runs
