= Katja Keitaanniemi =

Finnish business executive

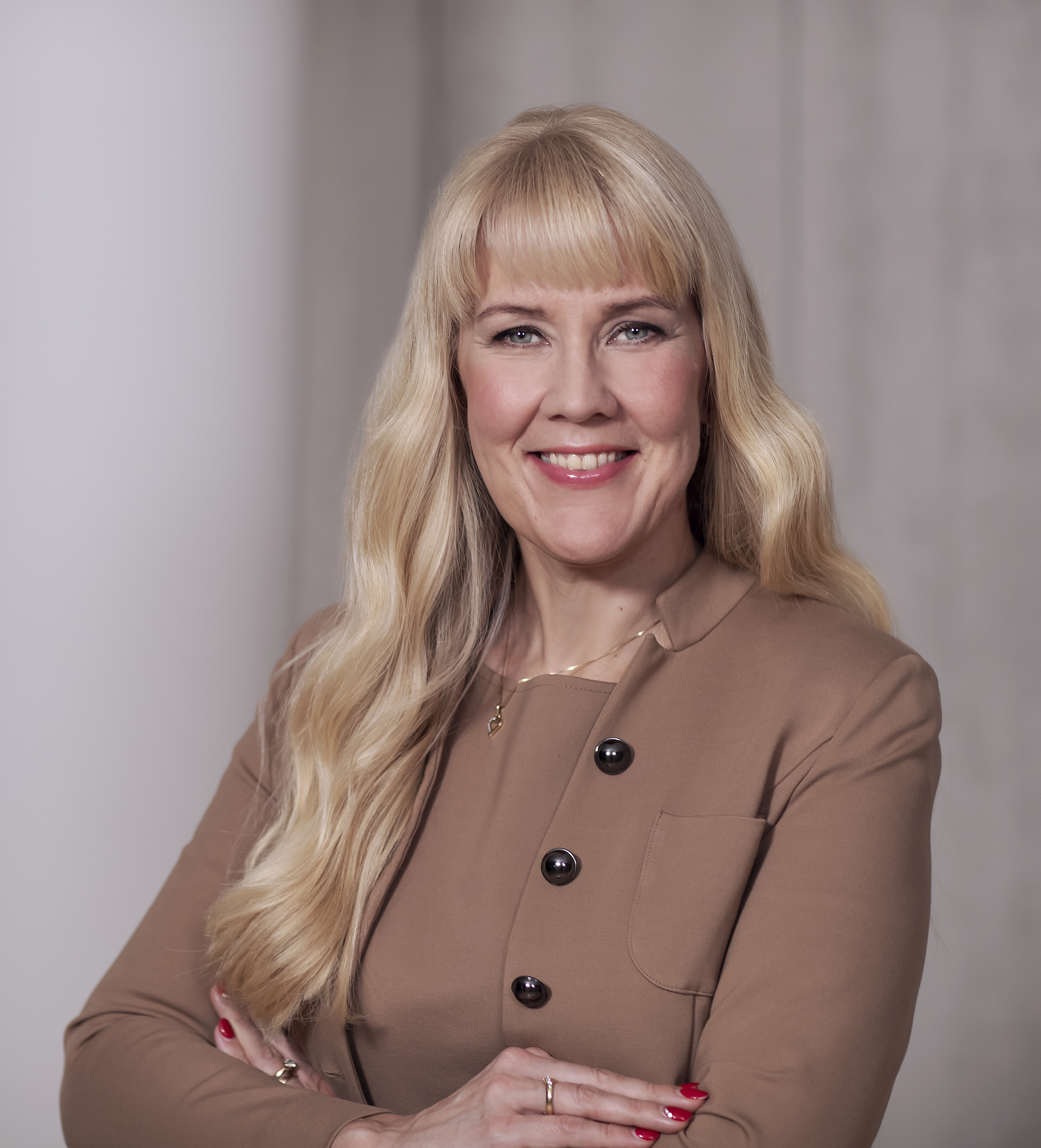
- Born: 1973 (age 52–53); Harjavalta, Finland
- Education: Licentiate of Science in Technology
- Alma mater: Helsinki University of Technology
- Occupations: President and CEO
- Term: 2018-
- Board member of: Chair of the Board of Directors of OP Asset Management, Vice Chair of OP Art Foundation’s Board and a member of the Board of OP Financial Group Research Foundation and of OP Retail Customers Plc.

Katja Keitaanniemi (born 1973) is the CEO of OP Corporate Bank, which is the most significant subsidiary of OP Financial Group. According to Corporate Finance Institute, OP Corporate Bank is among the top corporate banks in Finland. Keitaanniemi has been on the list of Finland's most powerful female executives by the business weekly Talouselämä in 2020, 2021, 2022 and 2023.

== Career ==
Keitaanniemi is a Licentiate of Science in Technology. She has also studied in Harvard University.

In her early career Keitaanniemi was Senior Analyst at Nordea Securities, Forest and Paper Products and Director of Research at eQ Bank. Keitaanniemi had also acted at Swedbank as Senior Vice President, Head of Investment Banking Finland and Member of Management Group of Global IB and SVP, Head of Research, Member of Executive Group. Before her career in OP Corporate Bank Keitaanniemi was Finnvera Oyj's Executive Vice President, Small and medium-sized enterprises and member of the Executive Group between 2014 and 2018.

Keitaanniemi has worked as OP Corporate Bank’s CEO since 2018 and is a member of OP Cooperative's Executive Management Team. Large Finnish corporations selected OP Corporate Bank as Finland's best corporate bank in 2020.

== Positions of trust ==
Some of Keitaanniemi's current and previous positions of trust:

- OP Cooperative: Member of Executive Management Team
- OP Asset Management Ltd: Chairman of the board
- OP Retail Customers plc: Board member
- OP Vakuutus (currently Pohjola Vakuutus): Board member
- OP Group Research Foundation: Board member
- OP Art Foundation: Board member, Deputy Chairman
- Uponor: Board member, Chair of the Audit Committee
- Finavia: Board member
- Business Finland: Member of the Executive Committee

== Awards and notability ==
- Keitaanniemi has been on the list of Finland's most powerful female executives by the business weekly Talouselämä in 2020, 2021, 2022 and 2023.
- The Financial Times has selected Keitaanniemi as Europe's best forest industry analyst and she is also the first one who ranked among the three top on the list for four consecutive years.
