= Early 1990s depression in Finland =

Finnish Economic Depression

The early 1990s depression in Finland was one of the worst economic crises in Finland's history, by some considered even worse there than the 1930s Great Depression.

The depression of 1991–1993 had a deep effect on the economy of Finland throughout the 1990s, especially in terms of employment but also in culture, politics and the general sociopolitical atmosphere. The gross national product decreased by 13%, and the unemployment rate rose from 3.5% to 18.9%.

== Causes ==
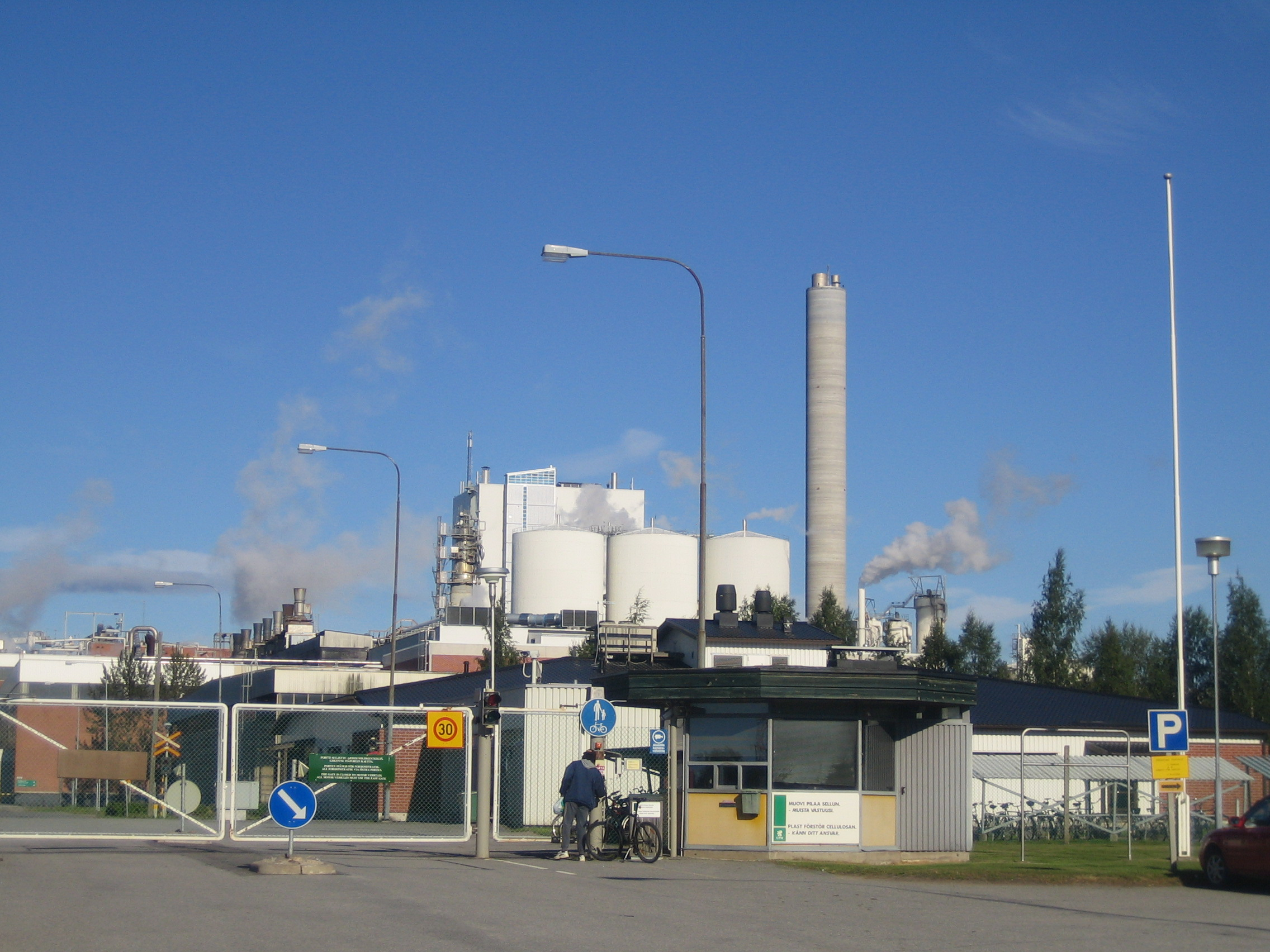
A market "bubble" was created by the paper industry in Finland in the late 1980s, the collapse of which was a contributor to the 1990s recession. This picture shows a paper factory in Jakobstad.

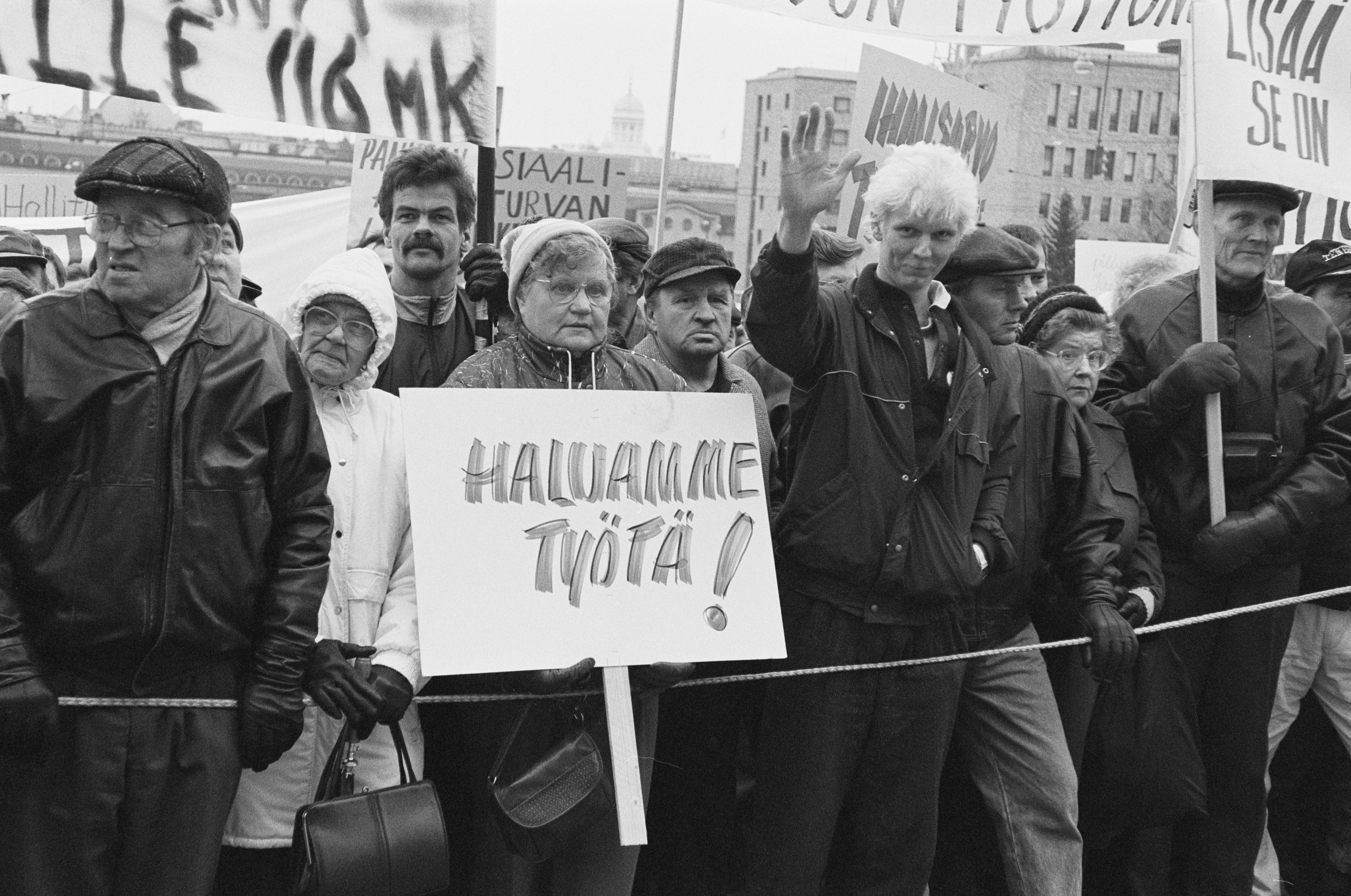
Demonstration of the unemployed in Helsinki 1993

An underlying cause was the economic policy of the 1980s. Finland experienced a strong economic boom throughout the 1980s that dragged on and "overheated" the economy, leading to the corrective contraction of the depression. One reason was a change in Finnish banking laws in 1986 to allow Finnish companies to seek credit more easily from foreign banks, which was considerably less expensive than Finnish domestic credit. That led to a large-scale search for foreign loan sources, which helped to undermine the strength of the Bank of Finland. Additionally, consumer credit regulation was drastically relaxed, and the consumer loan portfolio increased dramatically, at times by more than 100% per year. Those factors led to the strong short-term growth and in turn unsustainably increased both commercial and residential property values as well as the amount of money in the national economy. Stock and real estate bubbles created an environment in which large short-term profits were posted, leading to an artificially-inflated appearance of great wealth in the economy. The term "casino economy" was used to describe the use of loans to get very rich very quickly on paper by exploiting those bubbles.

The huge devaluation that occurred in November 1991 increased the debts of Finnish companies holding foreign loans in foreign currencies. They did not properly scale with the devaluation that the Kouri–Porter model had shown as early as in 1974. It was not followed in Finland in connection with the freeing of money market. However, foreign currency loans were only 15% of all loans.

The dissolution of the Soviet Union also played an important role, as it had represented 15–20% of Finland's foreign trade. Thus, a key Finnish export market disappeared nearly overnight. The rising price of oil in 1973 and 1979 and the increase of car use in Finland had also raised the level of the bilateral trade with the Soviet Union. Oil itself often had been used as currency for international trade between the two countries.

Furthermore, political decisions based on the strength of the Finnish mark weakened the international competitiveness of Finnish industry. In particular, much of the Finnish economy was reliant on the paper industry, which also experienced overproduction worldwide.

== Results ==
Consumption and investment fell in both the public and the private sector as a consequence of the depression. The number of company bankruptcies rose greatly, and the bankruptcies and the weak economy caused mass unemployment. Unemployment from 1992 to 1997 was consistently over 12% and went as high as 36.7% in construction industry during year 1994. Smaller banks ended up absorbed by larger banks because they had difficulty maintaining profitability as a result of risky loans made to companies that went bankrupt, resulting in a nationwide bank crisis.

The budget deficit of the state of Finland was several percentage points of the GNP. Furthermore, Finland's sovereign credit rating was downgraded.

== Economic policy ==
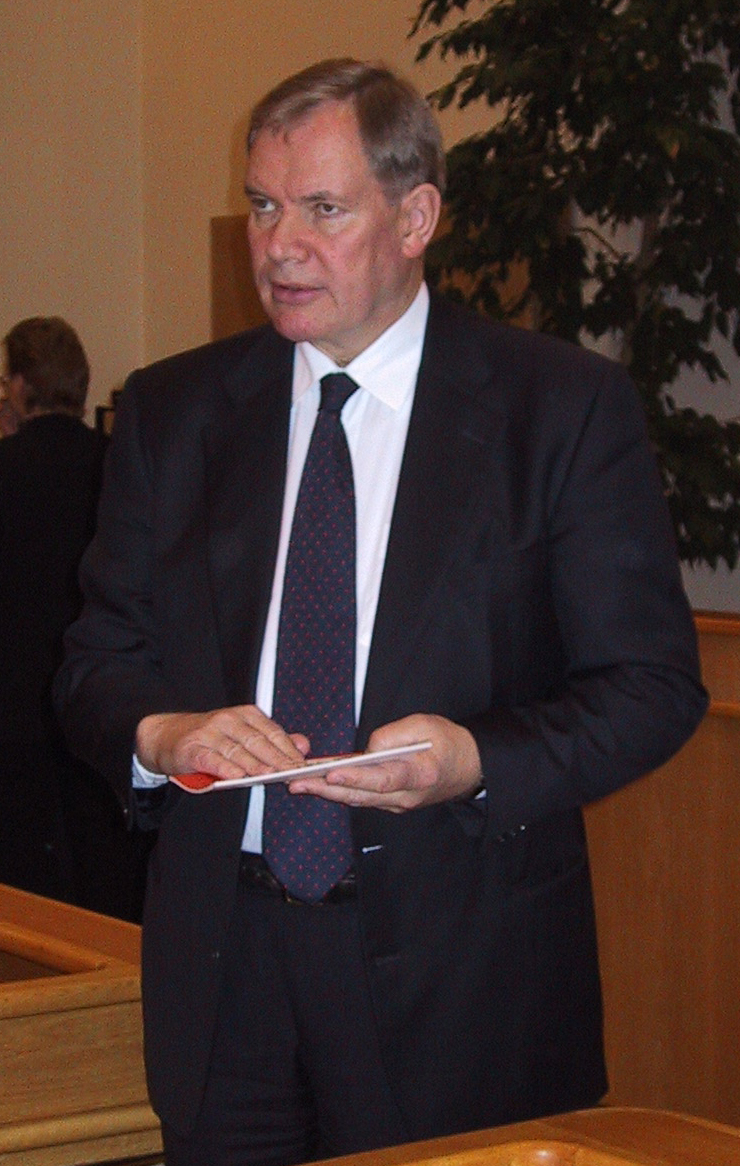
Paavo Lipponen served as the Prime Minister of Finland after the depression.

The liquidity of the banking system of Finland weakened as a consequence of the bank crisis. The government answered it by guaranteeing in 1991 the debts taken by the Finnish banks. To help the export industry, Finland performed devaluations in 1991 and 1992 and so entrepreneurs who had taken foreign currency loans found themselves in a financially-disadvantageous position.

To save the banks, the state deposit insurance fund, OHY Arsenal, was established and divided among loan-making banks. The largest recipients were the savings bank group Suomen Säästöpankki and Säästöpankkien Keskus-Osake-Pankki (SKOP), a bank owned by small local savings banks. The remaining banks also received financial support. The savings bank group was liquidated and divided among the Osuuspankki Group, Kansallis-Osake-Pankki (KOP), Postipankki and Yhdyspankki. In 1994, KOP had to merge with Yhdyspankki to form Merita Bank, which was later merged with Nordea.

National government and municipal spending were strongly cut to guarantee the liquidity of the country. That weakened social services and other things. In 1995, then-prime minister Paavo Lipponen continued to operate under austerity measures, which had restricted government expenditures even for a period after the depression had formally ended.

The Finnish economy began to gradually recover in the mid-1990s. The depression of the early 1990s was mainly localised in the Nordic countries, and each nation's economic difficulty had a reverberating effect for the others. In other parts of the world, the economy grew as normal, and Finland indeed recovered quite fast, especially with export-led economic growth after Finland's local financial matters had been settled. The guiding star was the conglomerate Nokia, which focused its efforts on mobile telephony and grew into a world market leader in less than a decade.

== See also ==
- Finnish banking crisis of 1990s
- Early 1990s recession
