= Charly Wegelius =

British cyclist

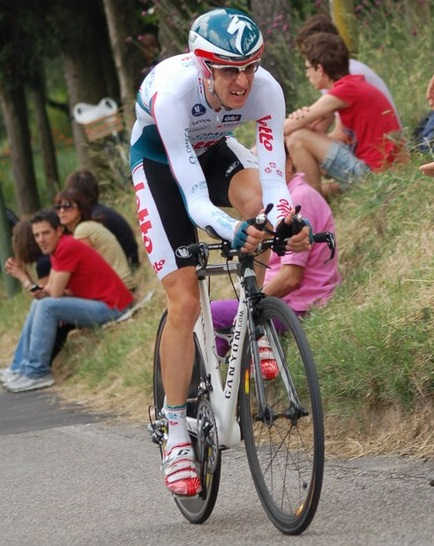
- Wegelius at the 2010 Giro d'Italia

Personal information
- Full name: Charles Wegelius
- Born: 26 April 1978 (age 48) Espoo, Finland
- Height: 1.80 m (5 ft 11 in)
- Weight: 62 kg (137 lb)

Cycling career
- Sport: Cycling
- Current team: Retired
- Discipline: Road
- Role: Rider
- Rider type: Climbing specialist Domestique

Amateur teams
- 1996–1998: Vendée U
- 1999: Linda McCartney Racing Team (stagiaire)

Professional teams
- 2000–2002: Mapei–Quick-Step
- 2003–2004: De Nardi
- 2005–2008: Liquigas–Bianchi
- 2009–2010: Silence–Lotto
- 2011: UnitedHealthcare

Managerial team
- 2012–: Team EF Education-Nippo

Major wins
- Grand Tours Giro d'Italia 1 TTT stage (2007)
Medal record
Representing Great Britain
Men's Road cycling
European Road Championships
Silver medal – second place	1999 Lisbon	Under-23 Time Trial

Charles "Charly" Wegelius (born 26 April 1978 in Espoo, Finland) is a British former professional road racing cyclist and current directeur sportif at EF Education–EasyPost

While Wegelius never won a race individually, He is better known for his role as a domestique, most notably in the mountains.

== Career ==
=== Early career ===
Wegelius started his career in France, riding for the Vendée U team managed by Jean-René Bernaudeau, thanks to the influence of former pro Graham Jones. His team-mates included Walter Bénéteau, Christian Guiberteau, Roger Hammond, Samuel Plouhinec, and Janek Tombak. He won a number of races in his first season, including beating Sandy Casar, who was the brightest prospect in the local area. His biggest result was winning the Under-23 section of the Grand Prix des Nations, after which Le Télégramme reported that Wegelius was one of the most promising riders of his generation.

Wegelius' cycling aspirations suffered an early setback, after being injured in an accident involving an all-terrain vehicle, which resulted in his spleen being removed and the news that he would never cycle again. He recovered, however, and had his first professional break in 1999, when he rode as a stagiaire for the ill-fated Linda McCartney Racing Team.

Wegelius participated in the cycling at the 2002 Commonwealth Games, where he finished 5th in the individual time trial and 28th in the road race. He also started the road race at the 2004 Summer Olympics, but failed to finish.

=== Italian years ===
Wegelius raced in Italy for a succession of teams between 2000 and 2009. At Mapei he was part of a generation of young cyclists that included Fabian Cancellara, Luca Paolini, Dario Cioni, Rinaldo Nocentini, Filippo Pozzato, Leif Hoste, Bernhard Eisel, Allan Davis, and Michael Rogers. Wegelius took part in his first Grand Tour, Mapei's last, at the 2002 Vuelta a España. After the team's sponsor pulled out at the end of 2002, Wegelius moved to the smaller De Nardi team, which raced on the Italian domestic scene. They were invited to the Giro d'Italia in 2003 and 2004. In 2004, Wegelius notably helped Serhiy Honchar to an unexpected second place, often driving the leading group up the difficult mountain stages.

=== World Championship controversy ===
Wegelius was involved in controversy in 2005 when he and teammate Tom Southam chose not to ride to protect Roger Hammond, their team leader, in the World Championship road race, and instead took instructions from the Italian team for a fee. Wegelius later repaid the costs associated with his participation in the event, and was never selected to represent his national team again. He later said that he regretted the incident.

=== Giro d'Italia ===
Having been on the Liquigas-Bianchi team since they reached the top level of cycling, Wegelius was a key domestique in the Giro d'Italia supporting Dario Cioni, Danilo Di Luca, and Stefano Garzelli. Wegelius competed in every Giro d'Italia between 2003 and 2010, and successfully supported Di Luca to victory in 2007, which was ironically the only Giro Wegelius failed to finish.

=== Participation in the Tour de France ===
Having previously ridden in the Giro d'Italia and the Vuelta a España, Wegelius made his Tour de France début in the 2007 edition. By finishing 45th, he was the best placed British rider in the general classification at 1 hour, 41 minutes and 5 seconds behind yellow jersey winner Alberto Contador. He received a call-up to participate in the 2009 Tour de France as a replacement for Thomas Dekker, who was ruled out following a positive drug test. He finished 60th in the general classification, 1 hour, 14 minutes and 25 seconds behind the winning Contador. Wegelius also began the 2010 Tour de France. However, much to his disappointment, he had to pull out after suffering from a sickness. It was his last participation in the Tour de France, as he retired after the 2011 Giro di Padania.

Following his retirement, he joined the then Garmin–Cervélo team as Directeur sportif.

== Personal life ==
Wegelius is the son of Christopher Wegelius, a Finnish former banker and the most successful show jumper ever to have represented Finland. His mother was English-born Elizabeth Jane Murray. Wegelius moved, as a small boy, with his mother, to England. He grew up in Yorkshire.

Wegelius was educated at Bootham School in York from 1989 to 1994.

Wegelius has a wife, Camilla, and two sons. They live in Finland.

== Career achievements ==
=== Major results ===
1995
1st Overall Junior Tour of Wales
1999
2nd European Under-23 Time Trial Championships
2nd Overall Okolo Slovenska
3rd Liège–Bastogne–Liège U23
4th Manx Trophy
5th Time trial, National Road Championships
2002
5th Time trial, Commonwealth Games
2004
5th Road race, National Road Championships
2005
3rd Overall Vuelta a Aragón
2006
5th Giro dell'Appennino
2007
1st Stage 1 (TTT) Giro d'Italia
2008
1st Stage 1b (TTT) Settimana internazionale di Coppi e Bartali
2011
10th Coppa Papà Carlo

=== Grand Tour general classification results timeline ===
Grand Tour	2002	2003	2004	2005	2006	2007	2008	2009	2010
Giro d'Italia	—	51	48	46	58	DNF	69	105	29
Tour de France	—	—	—	—	—	45	—	60	DNF
/ Vuelta a España	109	—	—	60	DNF	—	—	DNF	—

Legend
—	Did not compete
DNF	Did not finish
