= Ulf Sundqvist =

Finland politician (1945–2023)

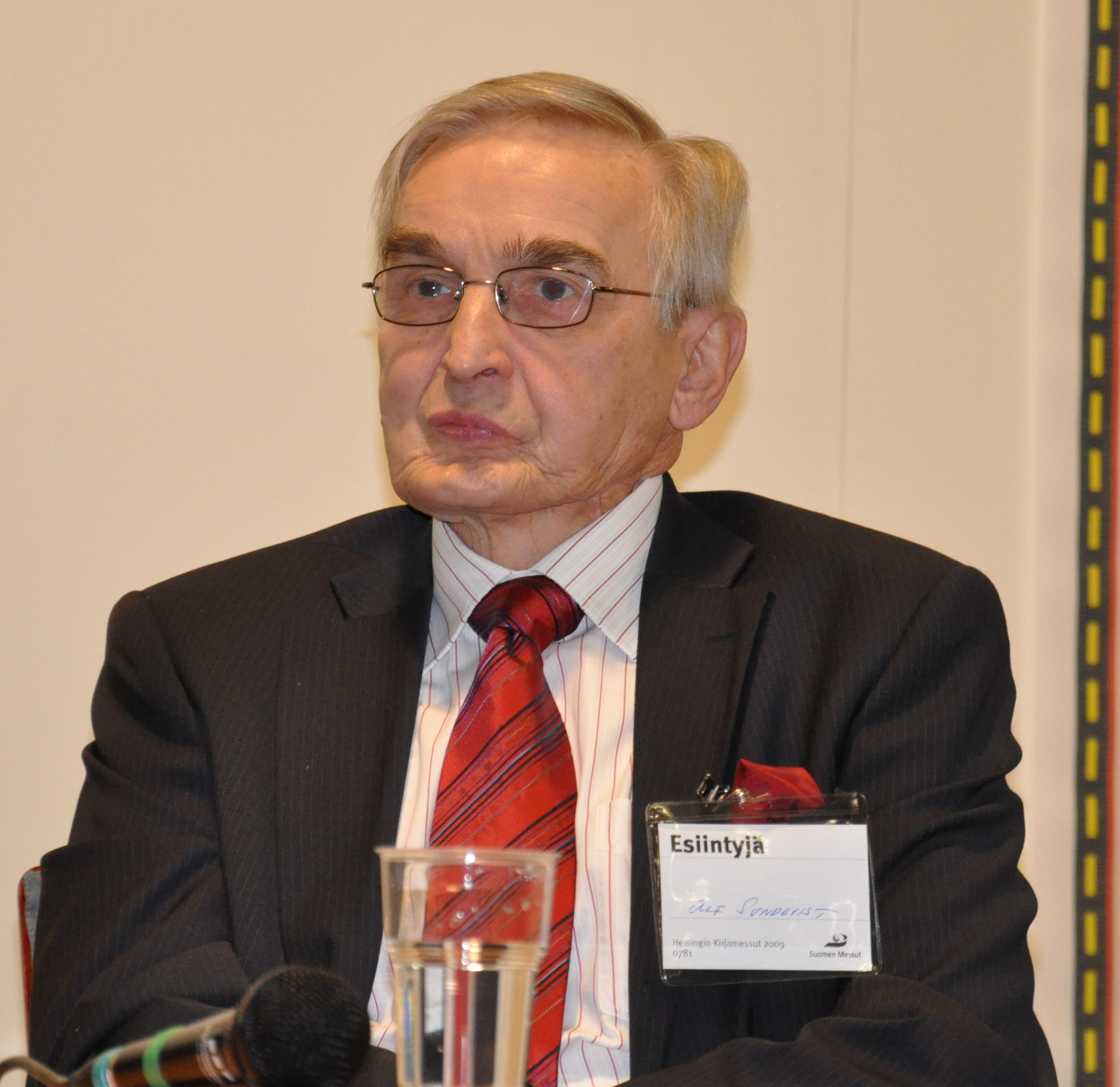
Sundqvist in 2009

Ulf Ludvig Sundqvist (22 February 1945 – 22 April 2023) was a Finnish politician who served as chairman of the Social Democratic Party of Finland, a minister in four cabinets in the 1970s and a banker in the 1980s.

== Political career ==
Sundqvist was elected into the Parliament in 1970 and served as the Minister of Education in three cabinets between 1972 and 1975. He was the Minister of Trade and Industry from 1979 to 1981. Sundqvist left the parliament in 1983 and worked as the manager of STS Bank from 1982 to 1991. However, STS was drawn into reckless lending in the late 1980s, and with the early 1990s recession in Finland, STS was bailed out by the government and sold at a loss to KOP. Although Sundqvist was personally involved in some minor financial irregularities, the main thrust of the accusations against him was rooted in his incompetent management and reckless lending practices.

Sundqvist was elected chairman of the SDP in November 1991, and he was replaced by Paavo Lipponen in June 1993. In 1993, Sundqvist was accused of fraud (charges he was later cleared of) and he had to resign as the chairman. In a civil trial, he was held financially responsible for the demise of STS, and was ordered to pay damages. However, he shirked this by intentionally keeping multiple credit accounts overdrawn. As a result, he was convicted of aggravated debtor's dishonesty. He was sentenced to pay back 16.4 million markkaa, but only 1.2 million mk were recovered. He also received a six months suspended prison sentence. Arja Alho used her authority as the second minister of finance to lower Sundqvist's financial liabilities in 1997, which led to her resignation.

== Post-politics ==
Later, Sundqvist was an entrepreneur and a management consultant. He had his own company, Navinor Oy, and he worked as a senior consultant at Kreab Gavin Anderson.

== Health complications and death ==
A smoker for 40 years, Sundqvist suffered a heart attack in Stockholm in 2004. At the age of 61, he was diagnosed with oral cancer. In 2007, a benign brain tumour (unrelated to the cancer) was found.

Ulf Sundqvist died on 22 April 2023, at the age of 78.
