= Panic of 1866 =

International financial downturn

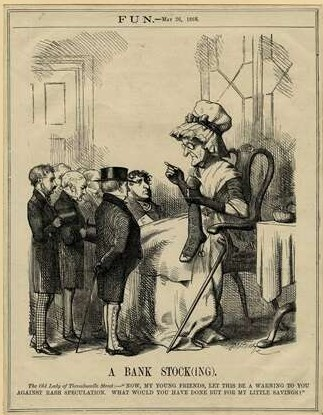
Cartoon from Fun magazine, 1866. The caption reads 'The Old Lady of Threadneedle Street — "Now, my young friends, let this be a warning to you against rash speculation. What would you have done but for my little savings?"'

The Panic of 1866 was a major financial crisis in the United Kingdom that accompanied the failure of Overend, Gurney and Company, a leading wholesale discount bank based in the City of London.

Only one in six of the joint-stock banks formed since 1844 survived this crisis. The Companies Act 1862 had created a financial boom which laid the groundwork for the larger banks of British finance during the latter half of the 19th century. The Panic decimated shipbuilding in London, and the Millwall Iron Works holding company collapsed.

== Impact on foreign trade ==
The primary importance of the expansion of credit was its role in foreign trade. Historians P. J. Cain and A. G. Hopkins note that "gentlemanly capitalism" (a class-conscious form of white-collar work in finance, insurance, shipping and the Empire) was the key to the growth of the Empire and its economic growth beginning in 1850. Historian David Kynaston notes the shift in the discount bills in the 1860s, particularly to finance supplies for the American Civil War, and Richard Roberts describes the 1860s, 1870s and 1880s as the "internationalisation of the discount market".

According to a 2022 study, "countries exposed to bank failures in London immediately exported significantly less and did not recover their lost growth relative to unexposed places. Their market shares within each destination also remained significantly lower for four decades."

== Bank of England ==
The Panic of 1866 was a key event in banking history. In the 12 May 1866 issue of The Economist, Walter Bagehot noted that the Bank of England's refusal to lend with Consol bonds as collateral was troubling. The following week he also wrote that this refusal had caused further panic, as well as that the bankers did not consider the Bank of England to be a government agency.

By issuing its letter suspending the Bank Charter Act 1844, however, it revealed its backing by the Government and was "confirming the popular conviction that the Government is behind the Bank, and will help it when wanted".

On 12 May 1866, Bagehot wrote that the panic now meant "a state in which there is confidence in the Bank of England and in nothing but the Bank of England", highlighting the conflict between the Bank's role in maintaining the liquidity of the domestic market and in maintaining its reserves to guarantee convertibility for foreign currency exchange. In a panic, not only did the need to maintain reserves mandated by the Bank Charter Act 1844 lead to hesitation by the Bank, but also the suspension of its requirements confused foreign investors, who believed the Bank had suspended payments, which led to concurrent massive foreign withdrawals.

The Bank of England adopted Bagehot's solution, which was an explicit policy of free offers to lend at high discount rates. This policy rebuilt the Bank's reserves. It also moderated and refined its use of monetary policy to influence capital flows in and out of the United Kingdom.

The Bank of England's response to the 1866 financial crisis helped make the sterling pound an international currency.

== Political impact ==
The economic impacts are held partially responsible for public agitation for political reform in the months leading up to the Representation of the People Act 1867. The crisis led to a sharp rise in unemployment to 8% and a subsequent fall in wages across the country. Similar to the "knife and fork" motives of Chartism in the late 1830s and 1840s, the financial pressure on the British working class led to rising support for greater representation of the people. Groups such as the Reform League saw rapid increases in membership and the organisation spearheaded multiple demonstrations against the political establishment such as the Hyde Park riot of 1866. Ultimately the popular pressure that arose from the banking crisis and the recession that followed can be held partly responsible for the enfranchisement of 1.1 million people as a result of Disraeli's reform bill.

== See also ==
- List of banking crises
