= Christopher Wegelius =

Finnish equestrian (1944–2025)

Harald Christopher Wegelius (13 September 1944 – 10 December 2025) was a Finnish banker and show jumper. He was involved with the collapse of Säästöpankkien Keskus-Osake-Pankki in the Finnish banking crisis of the early 1990s, but was finally cleared by the Supreme Court in 2000.

== Biography ==
Christopher Wegelius was born in Helsinki on 13 September 1944. He was the most successful Finnish show jumper and the latest Finn to compete in the sport at the Olympics. He took part in the 1980 Summer Olympics finishing in 12th place in the Individual Jumping Grand Prix. Wegelius was married to English-born Elizabeth Jane Murray from 1971 to 1981, and their son is the professional cyclist Charly Wegelius.

Wegelius died on 10 December 2025, at the age of 81.
