= Esko Seppänen =

Finnish politician (1946–2025)

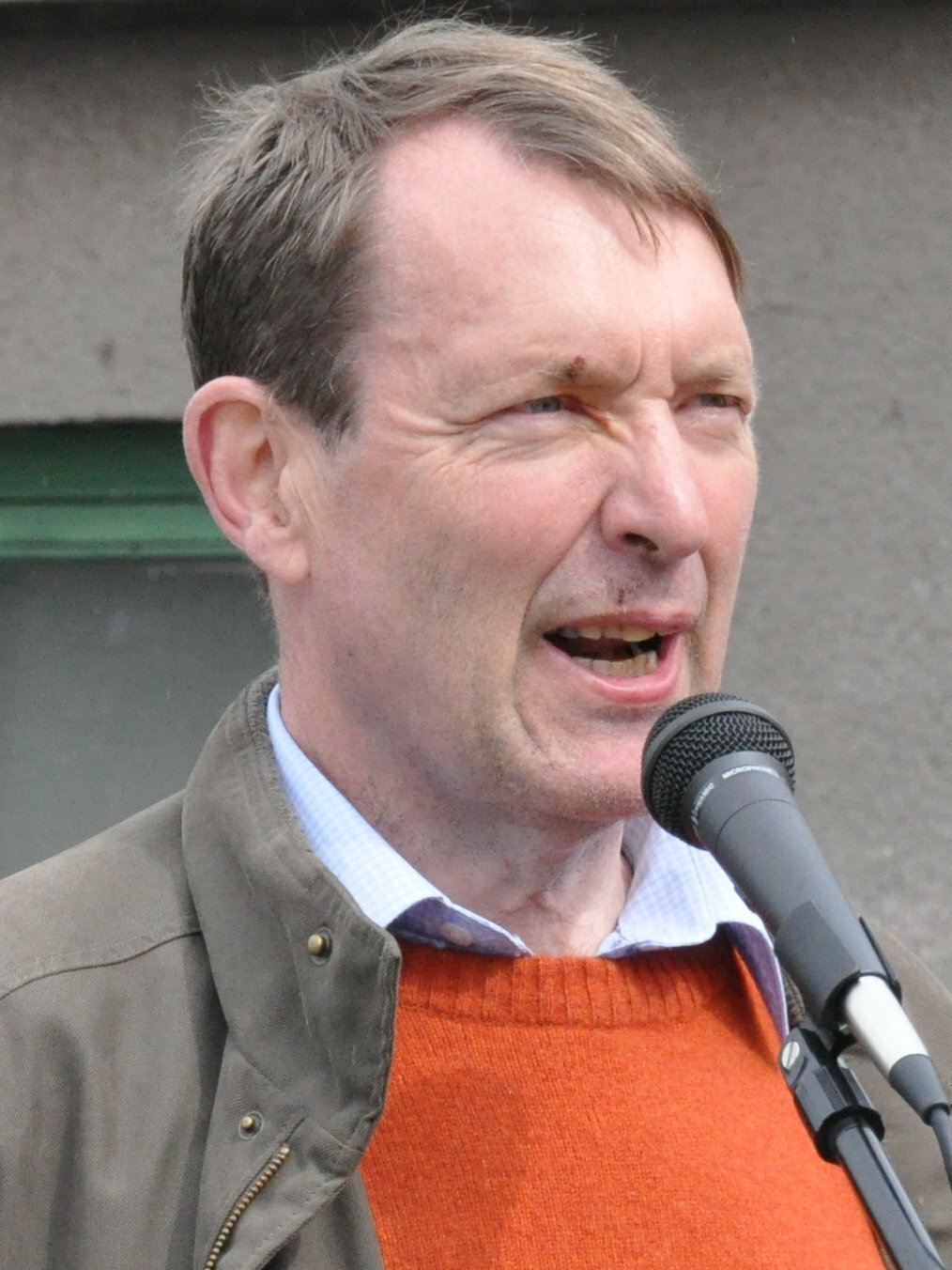
- Seppänen in 2009

Member of the European Parliament
- In office 1996–2009
- Constituency: Finland

Member of the Finnish Parliament
- In office 1987–1996

Personal details
- Born: 15 February 1946 Oulu, Finland
- Died: 6 December 2025 (aged 79) Helsinki, Finland
- Party: Left Alliance
- Other political affiliations: Communist Party of Finland
- Occupation: Journalist

Esko Olavi Seppänen (15 February 1946 – 6 December 2025) was a Finnish politician who represented the Left Alliance. He was a Member of the European Parliament (MEP) from 1996 to 2009, and a member of the Finnish parliament from 1987 to 1996.

In the European Parliament, Seppänen was a Member of the Bureau of the European United Left–Nordic Green Left and sat on the European Parliament's Committee on Budgets. He was also a substitute for the Committee on Budgetary Control and the Committee on Industry, Research and Energy.

Seppänen was born in Oulu and began politics by joining the Social Democratic Youth. In 1974, he joined the Communist Party of Finland. He belonged to the more Eurocommunist majority of the party (as opposed to the Taistoist Neo-Stalinist minority). In 1989, Seppänen opposed merging the Communist Party into the new Left Alliance (Vasemmistoliitto), criticizing the procedure as undemocratic. Nevertheless, Seppänen worked in the leadership of the new party until 2001.

He had a bachelor's degree in business studies (1971). He worked as journalist at Yleisradio in 1970–1987.

Seppänen died on 6 December 2025, at the age of 79.
