= Omaisuudenhoitoyhtiö Arsenal =

Omaisuudenhoitoyhtiö Arsenal Oy ("Asset Management Corporation Arsenal") was a bad bank-type corporation founded by the Government of Finland for management of assets received as collateral from bad debt. It was active from 1993 to 2024. Arsenal was founded after the early 1990s recession in 1993 as a response to the nationalization of failed banks, mainly the Säästöpankki Group and STS Bank. (The contribution of the Säästöpankki group to the total damages to the government was 96%.) The defaulted debts led to a large amount of property being passed to the government as collateral, with concomitant bankruptcy court cases where the state had an interest. In 1994, Arsenal held 4.822 million euros of assets and had 12,684 customers. In 1999, the business managing the real estate collateral was spun off as Kapiteeli Oyj, which was bought by Sponda in 2006. (Sponda was also founded as a result of the same crisis around real estate and stocks from the collapsed SKOP Bank, but since 2012 has had no government ownership.) Most of the remaining collateral was sold between 2000 and 2003. In 2003, Arsenal voluntarily started liquidation proceedings. As of May 2013, Arsenal had 121 debtors and 28 court cases ongoing, and kept four employees. In 2017, Arsenal was still in liquidation and pursuing court cases. Attorney Kari Uoti accused Arsenal of deliberately undervaluing its assets, which would allow it to post significant apparent profits. Asset settlement was completed in 2023, and Omaisuudenhoitoyhtiö Arsenal Oy was finally dissolved in 2024. All court cases had been finished and all bankruptcy estates liquidated. Any remaining property and receivables were transferred to the State Treasury.

The colloquial Finnish term for such a bad bank, coined in the early 1990s, is roskapankki "junk bank", so called for holding junk bonds.
