= Ceyla Pazarbasioglu =

Turkish economist

Ceyla Pazarbasioglu (Turkish: Ceyla Pazarbaşıoğlu) is a Turkish economist who served as Director of the International Monetary Fund's (IMF) Strategy, Policy, and Review Department from 2020 until her retirement in 2025. She previously held senior roles at the IMF and the World Bank Group and contributed extensively to global financial stability and sovereign debt initiatives.

== Education and Research ==
Pazarbasioglu earned a bachelor's degree in economics from Boğaziçi University in Istanbul and a Ph.D. in economics from Georgetown University. She also studied at Princeton University as a visiting scholar and is a Chartered Financial Analyst Charterholder. She has published widely cited research on financial crises and financial stability issues.

== Early career ==
From 1992 and 1998, Pazarbasioglu was an economist at the IMF, providing technical assistance to countries including the Czech Republic, Poland, Turkey, Ghana, Korea, Thailand, Russia, and several CIS states. She then served as Chief Economist for Emerging European Markets at ABN AMRO in London from 1998 to 2001.

== Public Sector and International Financial Institutions Roles ==
From July 2001 to June 2003, Pazarbasioglu was Vice President of the Banking Regulation and Supervision Agency of Turkey, where she helped contain and resolve the 2001 economic crisis, working on pension reform, inflation targeting, and a voluntary debt swap.

=== IMF Ukraine mission ===
From October 2008 to December 2009 Pazarbasioglu was Chief of the International Monetary Fund's mission to Ukraine during the global financial crisis.The IMF approved a $16.4 billion loan to Ukraine in November 2008 to bolster its economy.

=== World Bank Tenure ===
From 2015 to 2020, Pazarbasioglu served as Vice President for Equitable Growth, Finance, and Institutions at the World Bank Group. She oversaw a portfolio of nearly $30 billion and managed over 2,200 staff across 138 countries, including fragile and conflict-affected states.

=== Leadership at IMF SPR ===
In 2020, Pazarbasioglu became Director of the IMF's Strategy, Policy, and Review Department. She led the Fund's historic response to the COVID-19 pandemic, including scaling up emergency financing, negotiating the historic $650 billion Special Drawing Rights general allocation, and creating the IMF's Food Shock Window. She spearheaded reforms to IMF lending policies, launched the Resilience and Sustainability Trust, and advanced global debt initiatives usch as the Debt Service Suspension Initiative, The G20 Common Framework, and the Global Sovereign Debt Roundtable. She also played a key role in IMF engagement with the G7, G20, and United Nations.

=== Retirement from the IMF ===
Pazarbasioglu retired from the IMF on November 1, 2025, after more than two decades of service across three tenures the Fund.
