= 2022 Henan banks protests =

2022 protests in People's Republic of China

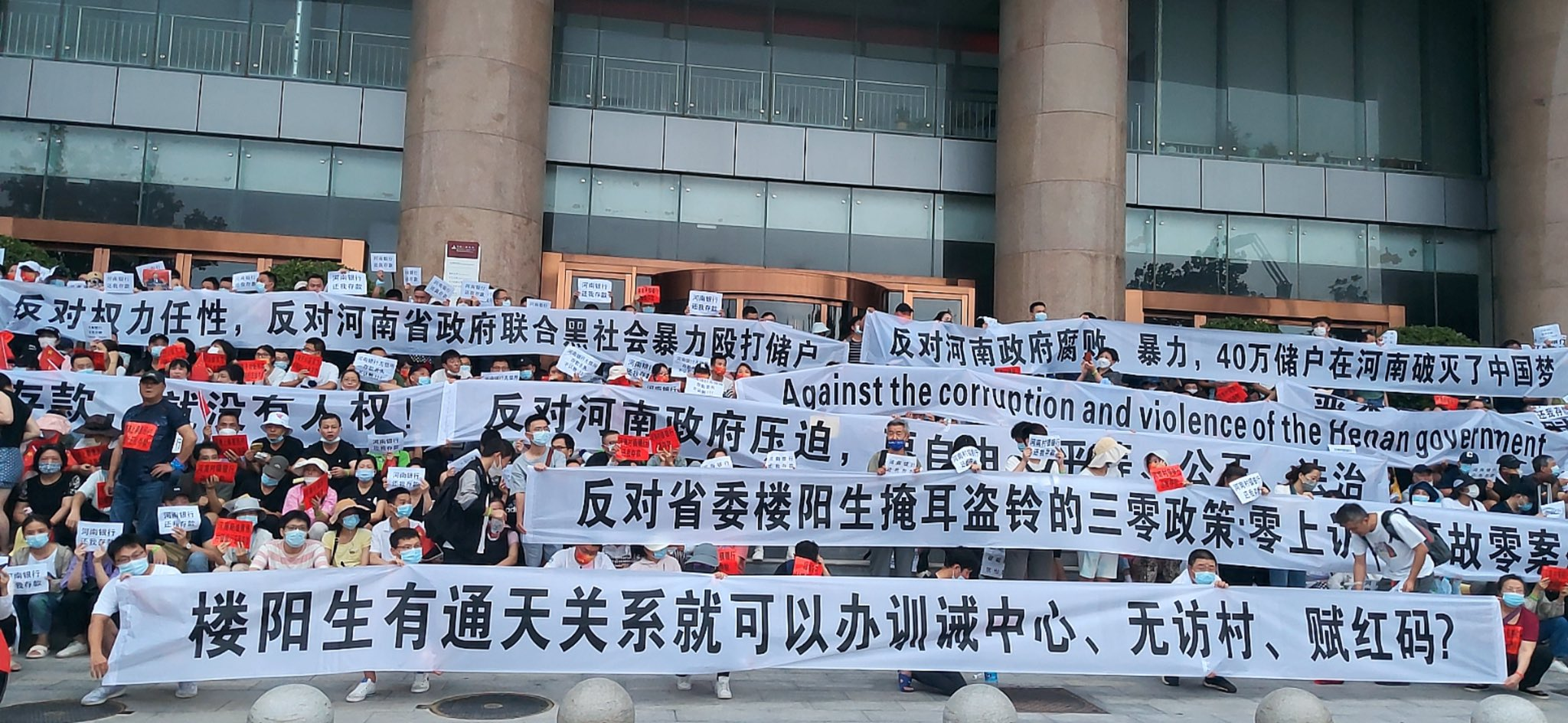
- Protestors outside the Zhengzhou central branch of People's Bank of China in July 2022
- Date: April 2022 – September 2022 (5 months)
- Location: Zhengzhou, Henan, China
- Caused by: Fraudulent practices in rural banks
- Goals: Access to depositors' funds
- Methods: Sit-ins, protests, online activism
- Result: Partial reimbursement announced

Parties
Henan Provincial People's Government; Zhengzhou Municipal Public Security Bureau; Henan Provincial Public Security Bureau	Protestors

Lead figures
Several leaders	No centralized leadership

The 2022 Henan banks protests were a series of demonstrations against four regional banks of Henan province, including Yuzhou Xinminsheng Village Bank, (Note: Chinese 禹州新民生村鎮銀行) Shangcai Huimin County Bank, (Note: Chinese 上蔡惠民村鎮銀行) Zhecheng Huanghuai Community Bank (Note: Chinese 柘城黃淮村鎮銀行) and New Oriental Country Bank of Kaifeng, (Note: Chinese 開封新東方村鎮銀行) over alleged financial corruption. Deposits totaling around 40 billion yuan at these four banks in Henan, as well as at Guzhen Xinhuaihe Village Bank (Note: Chinese 固鎮新淮河村鎮銀行) in the neighboring Anhui province, have been affected. Over the course of the several months, depositors held multiple protests in the city of Zhengzhou, which serves as the capital of the province of Henan.

== Background ==
As of 2022, there are over 1,600 rural banks in China, located in 31 provinces, accounting for about 36% of the total number of banking financial institutions in the country. According to the statistics of the People's Bank of China, as of the second quarter of 2021, a total of 122 rural banks were high-risk institutions, occupying about 29% of all high-risk institutions.

Village banks are relatively small and lack specialized regulation, resulting in higher risk and frequent violations such as money laundering and false disclosures. Their loan default rates are higher than other banks. To attract deposits, some village banks offer high returns and use third-party platforms that do not actually deposit funds into the bank, increasing risks of fund misappropriation.

Between 2011 and 2016, Xuchang Weidu Rural Commercial Bank (Note: Chinese 許昌魏都農村商業銀行, renamed to 許昌農村商業銀行 in October 2017) (now Xuchang Rural Commercial Bank) established several village banks, including Yuzhou Xinminsheng Village Bank, (Note: Chinese 禹州新民生村鎮銀行) Shangcai Huimin County Bank, (Note: Chinese 上蔡惠民村鎮銀行) Zhecheng Huanghuai Community Bank (Note: Chinese 柘城黃淮村鎮銀行) and New Oriental Country Bank of Kaifeng. (Note: Chinese 開封新東方村鎮銀行) These banks sold deposit products through internet platforms such as Du Xiaoman, (Note: Chinese 度小滿, Baidu online payment system) JD Finance, (Note: Chinese 京東金融) and Binhai Guojin, (Note: unofficial English translation based on the pinyin of Chinese 濱海國金) attracting many customers from provinces outside Henan, including Guangdong, Jiangsu, and Shandong. Their annual returns were around 4.6%, exceeding those offered by the "Big Four" state-owned Chinese banks during the same period. Besides attracting deposits through online channels, they sometimes also provide subsidies or monetary rewards face-to-face to avoid regulations.

== Early indications ==
On 7 August 2018, the Xuchang China Banking and Insurance Regulatory Commission (Xuchang CBIRC) issued a warning to Xuchang Rural Commercial Bank and fined it 200,000 yuan. The penalty was due to the bank's failure to properly implement the responsibilities and obligations of its governance entities. Twenty days later, Xuchang CBIRC imposed another administrative penalty on the bank, this time fining it 300,000 yuan for concealing the actual use of funds through interbank business and conducting interbank transactions in violation of regulations.

As early as 14-15 July 2020, Zhu, a resident of Xiangfu district, Kaifeng, spread related information regarding New Oriental Country Bank of Kaifeng in a WeChat group, causing a bank run. Zhu was subsequently detained by the local police. In response, Wang Yantao, (Note: Chinese 王彥濤) Chinese Communist Party Deputy Committee Secretary of Xiangfu and district mayor, stated that

New Oriental Country Bank of Kaifeng is a legitimate financial institution, and it is an insured unit under the People’s Bank of China’s deposit insurance. The rights and interests of depositors are fully protected by national laws... We urge the depositors to rest assured that everyone’s deposits at New Oriental Country Bank of Kaifeng are safe, and you can deposit and withdraw funds freely.

In March 2022, Sun Zhenfu, the main stockholder of the banks, was arrested by the government for "serious financial crimes", and an investigation by the CBIRC wrote that a private investment company collaborated with the banks to illicitly attract public funds via online platforms.

== History ==
=== Frozen accounts ===
In April 2022, four rural banks in the Henan province stopped allowing customers to withdraw cash because "the banks were upgrading their systems". Thousands were denied access to their accounts, triggering a bank run as customers of the four banks attempted to withdraw their funds en-masse. The frozen accounts are estimated to worth 40 billion yuan, affecting 400,000 people.

=== Protests ===
==== May - June ====
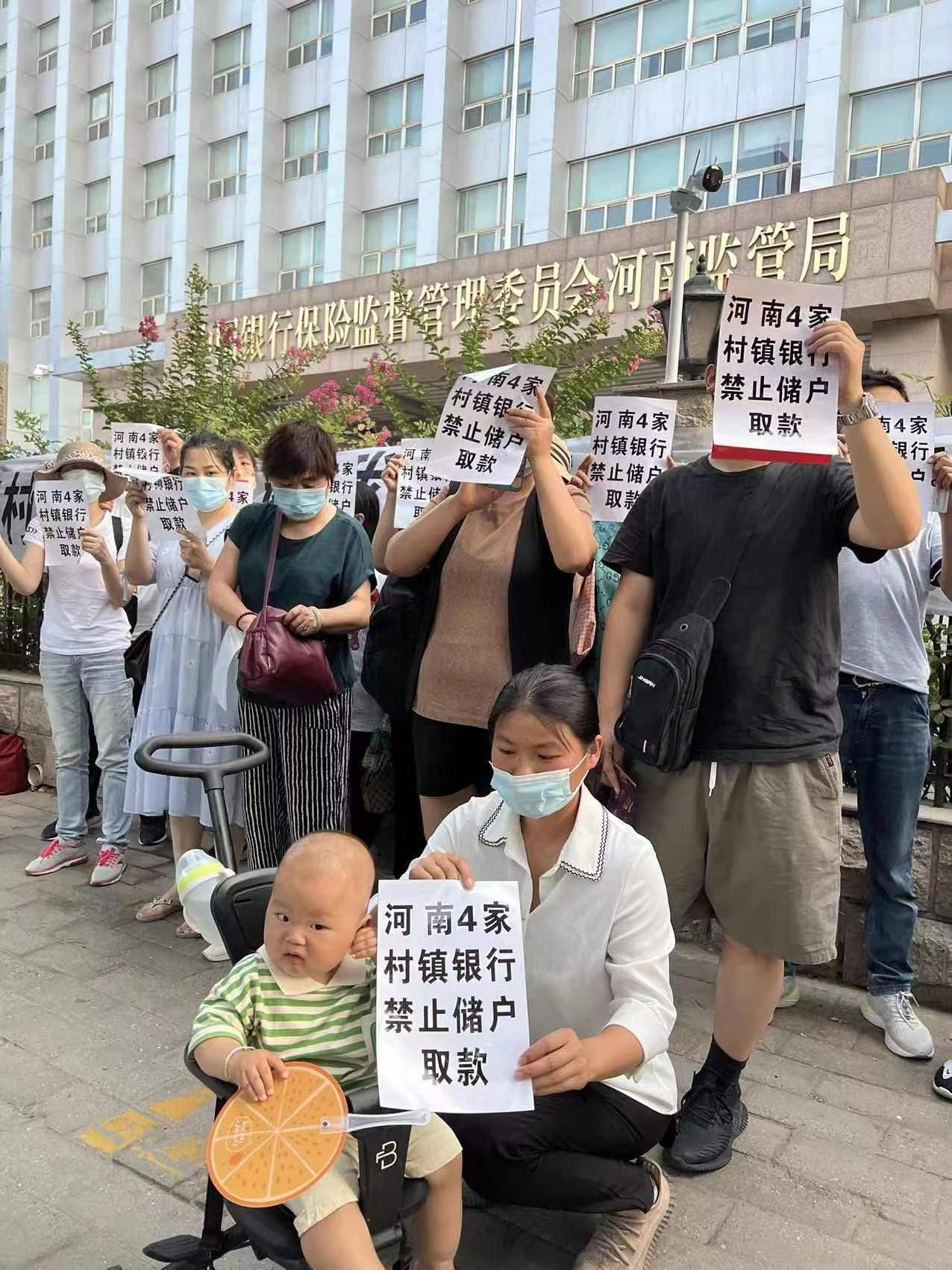
Protestors outside Henan CBIRC

Depositors started mounting small protests.

On 23 May, a large-scale protest was held outside the Henan China Banking and Insurance Regulatory Commission (Henan CBIRC). Thousands of protesters gathered, holding signs that read "Return Our Savings," demanding that the authorities ensure hundreds of billions of yuan are smoothly returned to depositors. Local police later dispersed the crowd. A video clip shows Yang Huajun, (Note: Chinese 楊華軍) Deputy Director of the Henan CBIRC, arriving on site and using a loudspeaker to assure the public that as long as the funds are deposited legally and in compliance with regulations, they will be protected by law—provided that the public is unaware and has not participated in any illegal activities.

The South China Morning Post and BBC reported fears that by June the Health Code system was being abused. Authorities could allegedly assign a red code to potential protesters to prevented them from traveling. Following widespread public attention to the issue, several depositors responded that their health codes switched back to green on 14 June. However, subsequent reports indicated that some code reverted to red shortly afterward.

On 27 June, dozens of protestors gathered outside Henan CBIRC. As the crowd grew, Zhengzhou police arrived to disperse the crowd, surrounding them and forcibly boarding them onto buses. On 28 June, another dozens of protestors gathered in Zhengzhou, chanting for the banks to return their savings.

==== 10 July ====
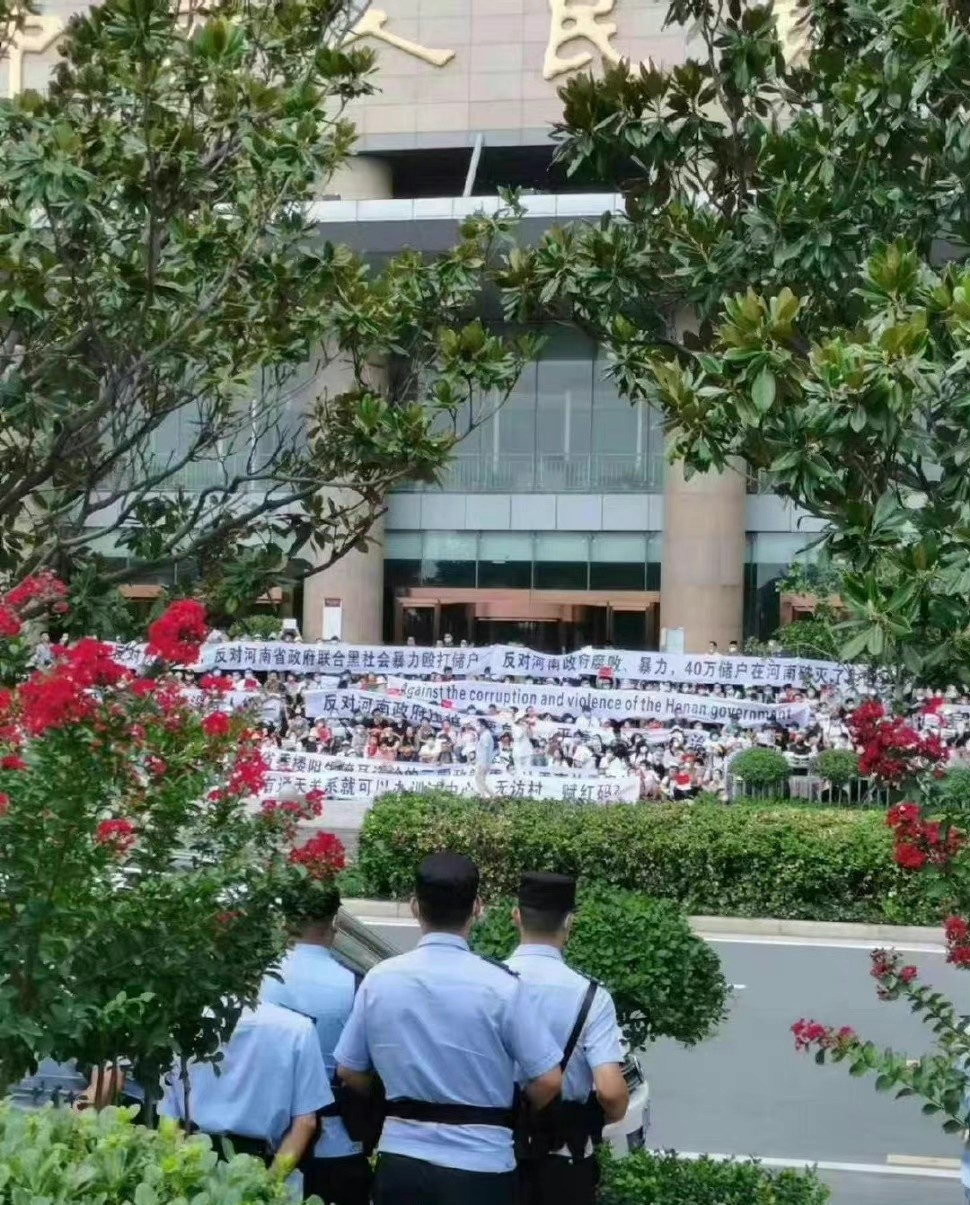
Protestors and police in front of the Zhengzhou central branch of People's Bank of China

On July 10 at 4 am, thousands of protestors started gathering in front of the Zhengzhou central branch of People's Bank of China. They gathered before dawn to avoid government interception. By 5 am, a large crowd had already gathered, including elderly, children, pregnant women and disabled individuals. They occupied the entrance steps, shouting slogans and holding banners, demanding the return of their deposits.

Around 8 am, police blocked the street. At 9:40 am, Qin Hanfeng, (Note: Chinese 秦汉锋) director of the Henan CBIRC, and deputy director Yang Huajun assured depositors their legal funds would be protected. Li Gang, (Note: Chinese 李刚) director of the Henan Public Complaints and Proposals Administration, (Note: Chinese 河南信访局, local branch of National Public Complaints and Proposals Administration) urged them not to gather illegally and advised them to submit demands online. However, because of the distrust towards the local government, officials' attempts ultimately failed.

Protesters carried banners explicitly targeting the Henan Provincial People's Government, accusing it of collusion with criminal organizations and the violent suppression of citizens. Messages included "Oppose the abuse of power, oppose the Henan provincial government colluding with the mob to violently assault depositors", (Note: Chinese 「反對權力任性，反對河南省政府聯合黑社會暴力毆打儲戶」) "Oppose the corruption and violence of the Henan government — 400,000 depositors' Chinese Dream was shattered in Henan", (Note: Chinese 「反對河南政府腐敗、暴力，40萬儲戶在河南破滅了中國夢」) and one written in English "Against the corruption and violence of the Henan government". Other banners criticized Party Secretary of Henan Lou Yangsheng. Some read "Oppose Secretary Lou Yangsheng’s deceptive three-zero policy: zero petitions, zero incidents, zero cases", (Note: Chinese 「反對省委樓陽生掩耳盜鈴的三零政策：零上訪零事故零案件」) "Does having connections allow Lou Yangsheng to set up admonishment centers. (Note: a center to practice re-education through labor) no-petition villages, (Note: Petitioning (上訪) is usually the only way for Chinese civilians get justice, if their legal rights are not protect. They often petition by traveling to Beijing and presenting their case to a higher level governor from the central government. No-petition village (無訪村) refers to blocking all petitions in that village.) and assign red health codes?" (Note: Chinese 「樓陽生有通天關係就可以辦訓誡中心、無訪村、賦紅碼？」) Other framed their protest in broader terms of human rights, justice, and the rule of law, declaring: "No deposits, no human rights" (Note: Chinese 「沒有存款，就沒有人權」), "Oppose the oppression by the Henan government — we want justice, we want rule of law". (Note: Chinese 「反對河南政府壓迫，我們要公正，要法治」)

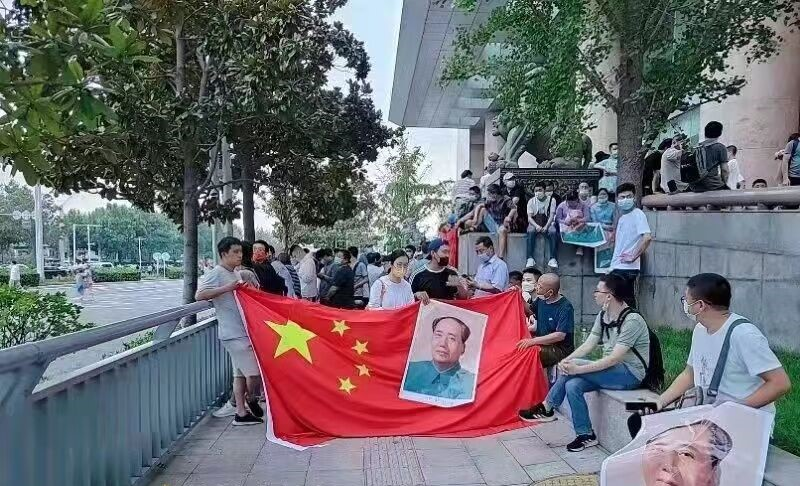
Protestors holding portraits of the late Chinese leader Mao Zedong and waving the national flag of the People's Republic of China

In a symbolic gesture, protesters held up large portraits of the late Chinese leader Mao Zedong and waved the national flag of the People's Republic of China. A giant portrait of Mao was affixed to a pillar at the entrance of the Zhengzhou central branch of the People's Bank of China. According to CNN, using the national flag to display patriotism is a common tactic among mainland Chinese protesters. Given the strict suppression of dissent in the country, this strategy signals that their grievances are aimed solely at local governments, while demonstrating loyalty to and reliance on the central government to seek justice. Radio France Internationale noted that in China, a country that places great importance on maintaining social stability, public demonstrations are rare. Furthermore, police generally exhibit higher tolerance toward economic and financial protests compared to political demonstrations.

Police announced from a vehicle equipped with loudspeakers that the gathering was illegal and warned the protesters that if they did not disperse, they would be detained and fined. Groups of security officers wearing plain T-shirts were standing beside the police. The standoff lasted several hours until around 11 a.m., when security officers suddenly rushed up the steps and engaged in physical clashes with the protesters. In response, the protesters threw bottles and other small objects at them. Eyewitnesses and social media videos showed the scene quickly descending into chaos. The security officers dragged protesters down the steps and beat those resisting, including women and the elderly. Police officers on-site made no effort to intervene. Some people were beaten until their faces were bleeding, and a disabled person was reportedly beaten into unconsciousness. Many were shocked by the violence.

Many protesters were forcibly taken onto buses and transported to various detention sites, including schools, hotels, factories and village committees. They were required to register their information and sign guarantees promising not to gather again. Some protestors said they were escorted by assigned personnel to the train station and forced to leave by train. Additionally, some were detained by Zhengzhou police and became unreachable.

== Resolution ==
On July 12, the CBIRC announced it would start reimbursing account holders, with deposits of up to 50,000 yuan ($7,400) being the first to be returned.

Afterwards, the amount of compensation for the number of deposits are gradually increasing:

- up to 100,000 yuan ($14,787), on July 21.
- up to 150,000 yuan, on August 1.
- up to 250,000 yuan, on August 8.
- up to 350,000 yuan, on August 15.
- up to 400,000 yuan, on August 22.
- up to 500,000 yuan, on August 30. And if it exceeds 500,000 yuan, compensation will be made according to the amount of 500,000, and the right to compensate beyond 500,000 yuan is reserved until the bank assets involved in this incident are properly disposed of. The amount of 500,000 yuan is the maximum compensation amount for deposit insurance.
- On January 9, 2023, it was reported that the bank involved began to make an appointment to register depositors with more than 500,000 yuan.

== Effect to wider economy ==
The Henan bank crisis is contributing to growing volatility in the Chinese financial system. Since at least 2022, there has been an increasing number of defaulted property loans recorded on the books of smaller, regional lenders. The Australian Financial Review reported that the Chinese government does not seem to have a satisfactory solution to the financial and property sector crisis.

== Misinformation ==
A video circulated on social media which claimed that the People's Liberation Army deployed tanks to defend the banks from the protesters. An Associated Press fact check found that the footage was from a routine training exercise in Shandong, more than 400 kilometers away.
