= OP Financial Group =

Financial company in Finland

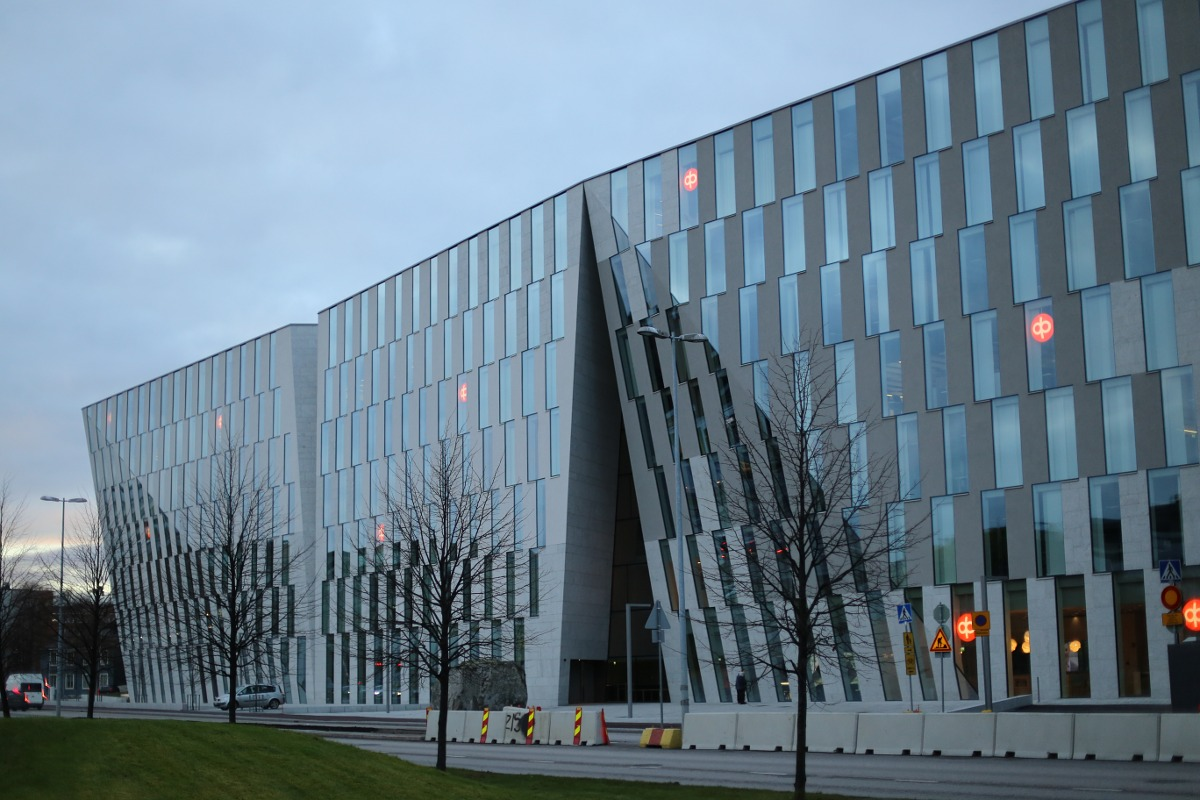
- OP Financial Group headquarters in Vallila, Helsinki
- Type: Private (cooperative bank)
- Industry: Financial services
- Headquarters: Helsinki, Finland
- Area served: Finland
- Key people: Timo Ritakallio (President and Group Executive Chairman)
- Products: Banking, Insurance
- Revenue: ▲€3.115 billion (2017)
- Operating income: ▼€1.077 billion (2017)
- Net income: ▼€764 million (2017)
- Total assets: ▲€163.663 billion (Q1 2026)
- Total equity: ▲€11.121 billion (31 December 2017)
- Number of employees: 12,269 (31 December 2017)
- Subsidiaries: OP Bank Group Central Co-operative, OP Corporate Bank, Pohjola Bank, Helsingin OP Pankki, OP-Kotipankki
- Website: www.op.fi

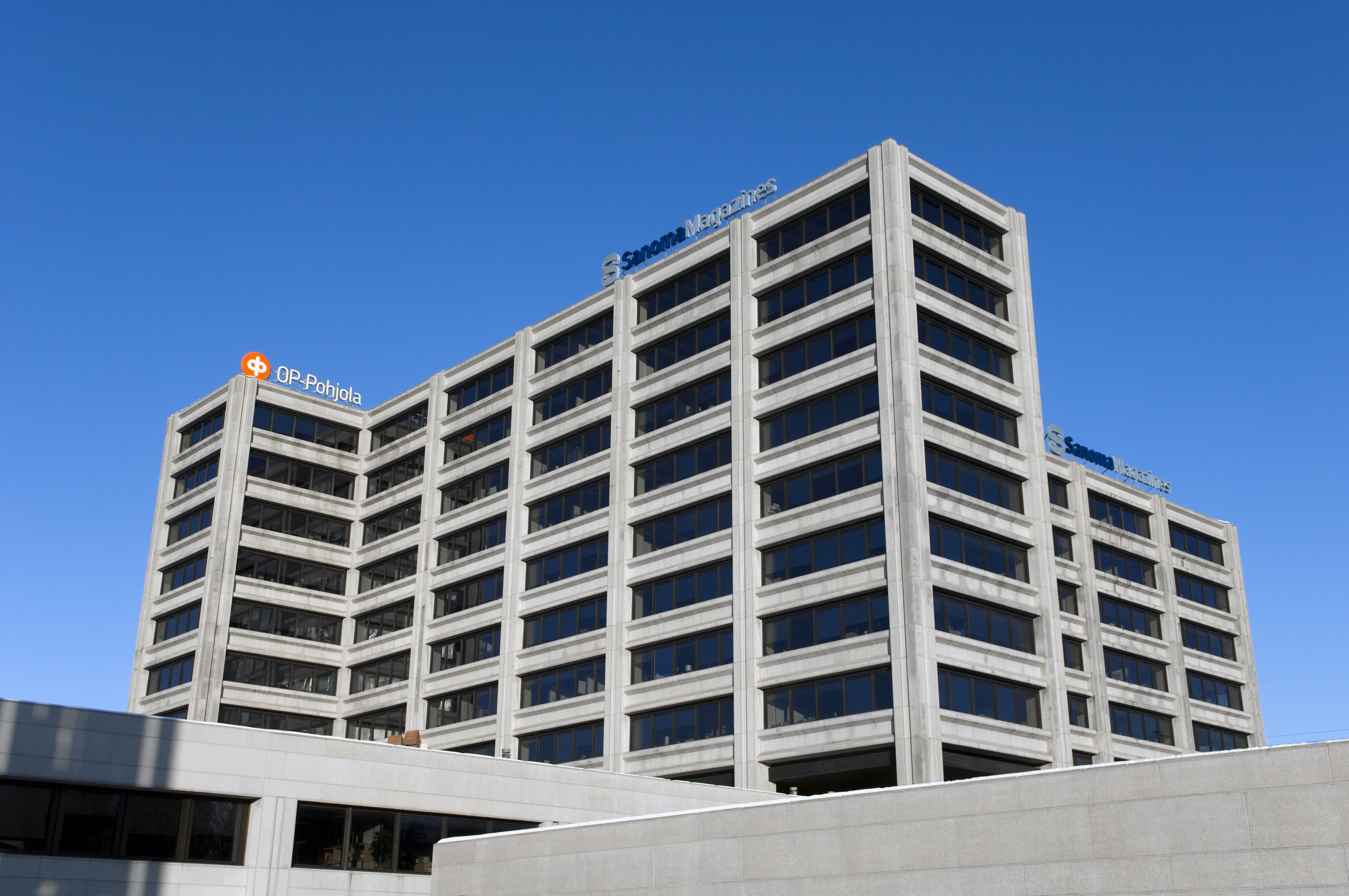
Former OP-Pohjola Group headquarters in Niemenmäki, Helsinki

OP Financial Group is one of the largest financial companies in Finland. It consists of 180 cooperative banks and their central organization. "OP" stands for osuuspankki in Finnish, literally meaning "cooperative bank". The financial group has over 2 million customer-owners, offering retail and commercial banking services all over Finland, as well as insurance services.

In 2014 the group acquired the remainder of the shares of Pohjola Bank and consolidated its services under the OP brand, shortening its name to OP from OP-Pohjola, a name it had used since 2007.

OP's current headquarters are located in Vallila, Helsinki, and opened in 2015.

OP has been designated as a Significant Institution since the entry into force of European Banking Supervision in late 2014, and as a consequence is directly supervised by the European Central Bank.

== History ==
The company's predecessor was founded in 1891 when the fire insurance company Palovakuutus-Osakeyhtiö Pohjola commenced its operations. Pohjola Bank was listed on the Helsinki Stock Exchange in 1922, being one of the first companies to be listed in Helsinki.

The first local cooperative credit societies were founded in 1902 and received a large loan from the Finnish state the next year. The central organization for cooperatives was founded in 1928 as an ideological organization between local branches. As the business environment has changed and banking regulation has tightened, the central organization has increased its influence on local banks significantly.

In 1996, OP launched their Internet banking site, which was the first in Europe and the second one in the world.

In 2005 the central organization of OP Financial Group became a major shareholder of Pohjola Bank, which made the group the largest financial services group in Finland. The remainder of the shares were acquired in 2014.

== Healthcare ==
In 2014 OP announced plans to expand into the health and wellbeing market. It operated a hospital in the Helsinki region. In 2021 it cancelled the plan and sold the hospital.

== OP Corporate Bank ==
OP Corporate Bank Plc is the most significant subsidiary of OP Financial Group.

OP Corporate Bank's customers are large companies in Finland. It is responsible for the Baltic business, operating as a bank for large companies and conducting financial services in Estonia, Latvia and Lithuania. In addition, OP Corporate Bank offers financial services in internationalization. OP Corporate Bank also acts as the OP Financial Group's central bank.

Katja Keitaanniemi has been the president and CEO of OP Corporate Bank since 2018.

== Gallery ==
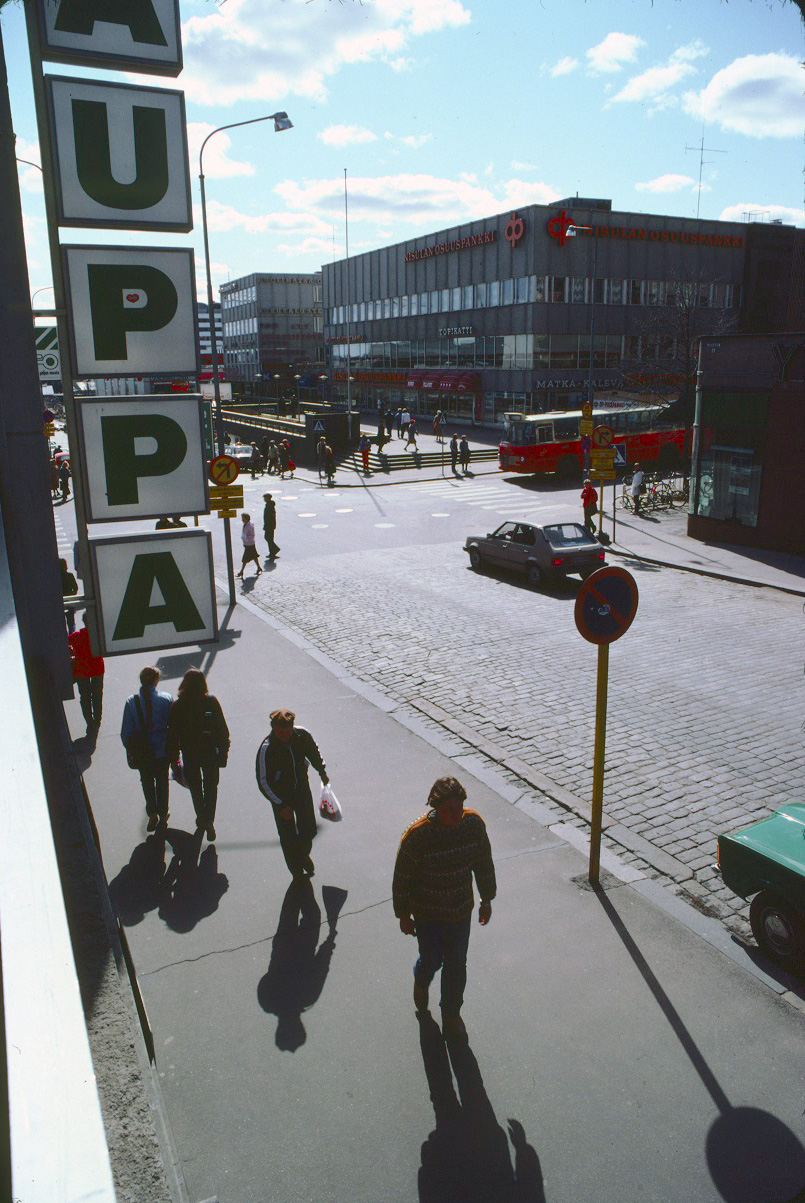
Jyväskylä OP-Bank in 1979

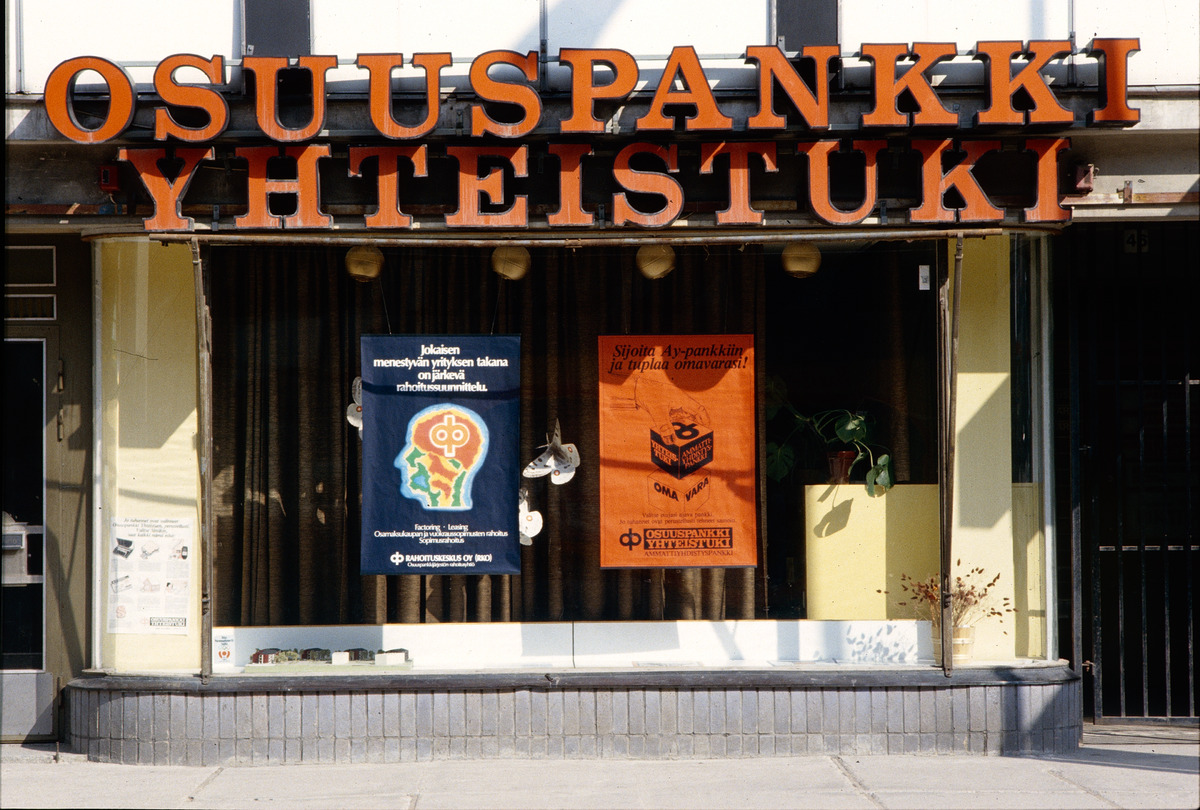
Lappeenranta OP-Bank in 1982

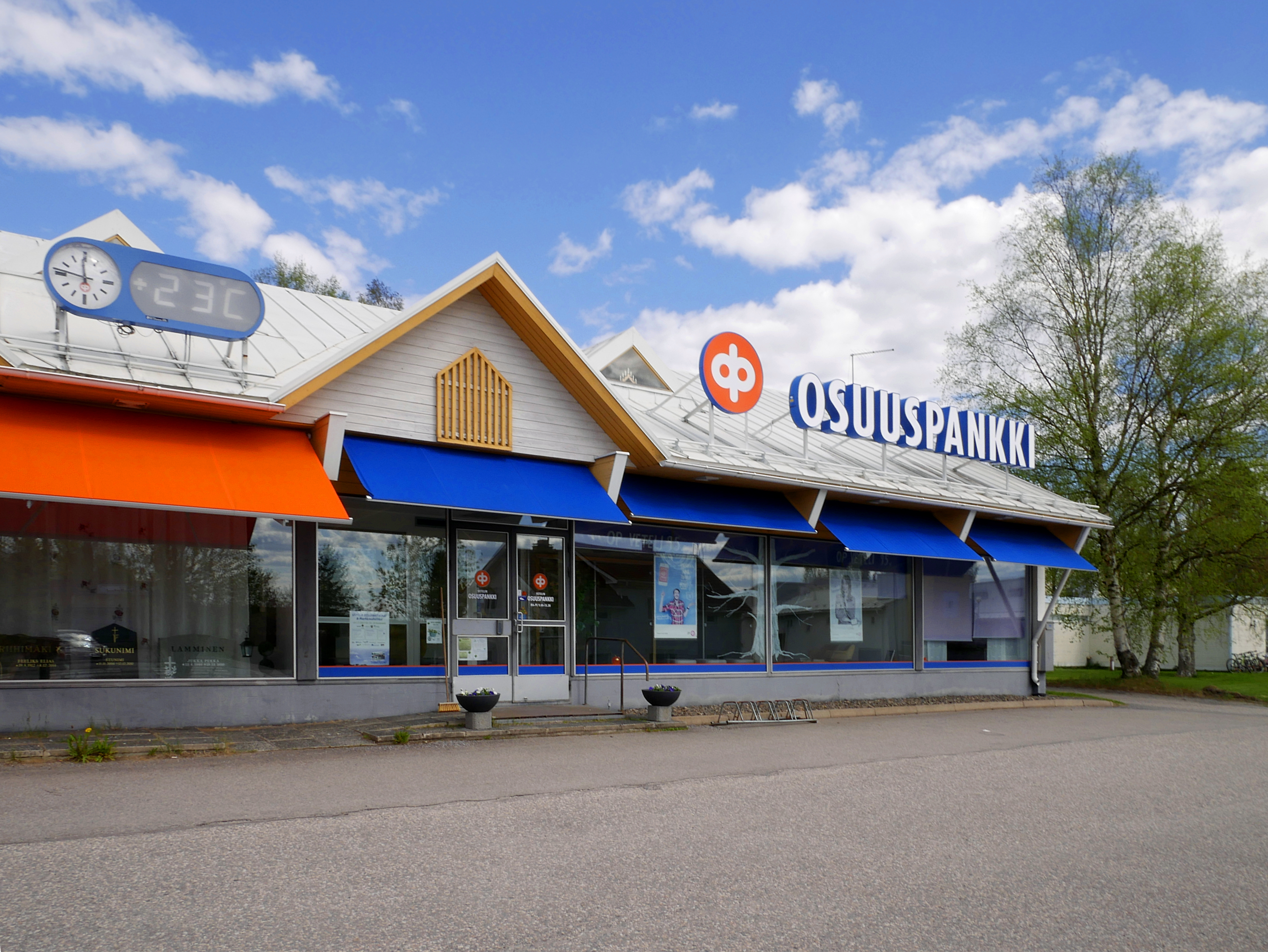
Veteli OP-Bank

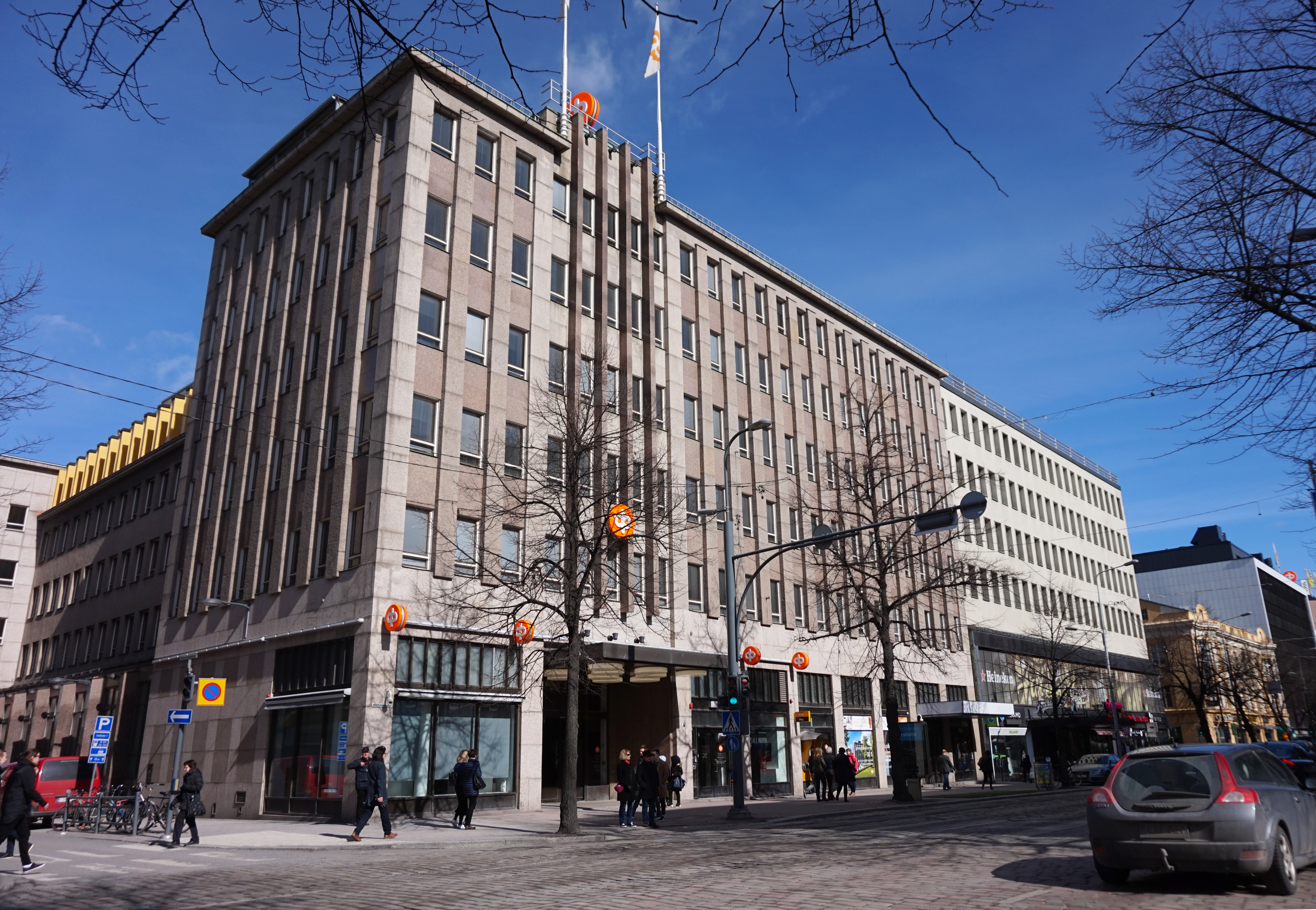
Tampere OP-Bank

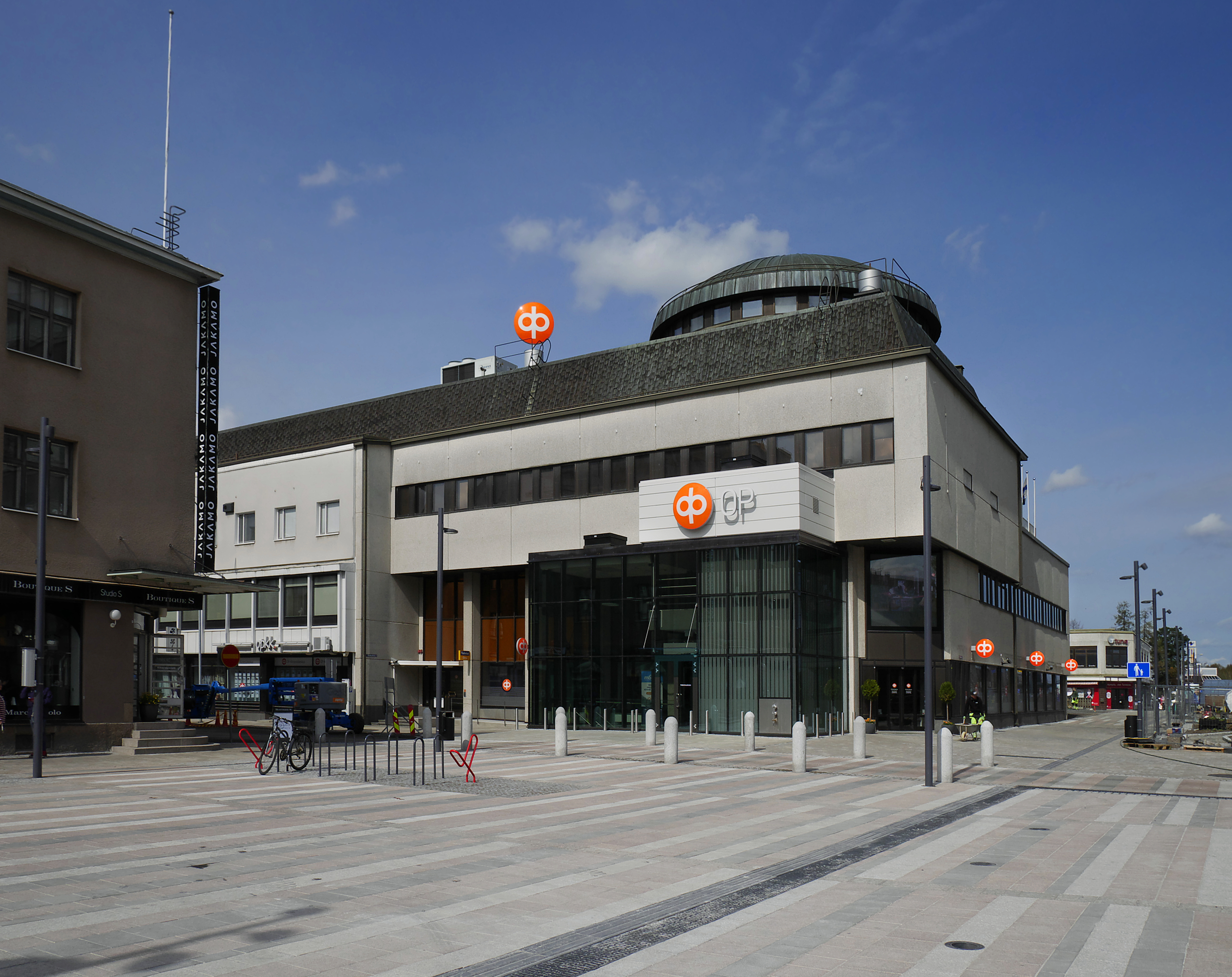
Seinäjoki OP-Bank

== See also ==
- POP Bank Group
- List of European cooperative banks
- List of banks in the euro area
- List of banks in Finland
