= Taneli Tikka =

Finnish technology serial entrepreneur

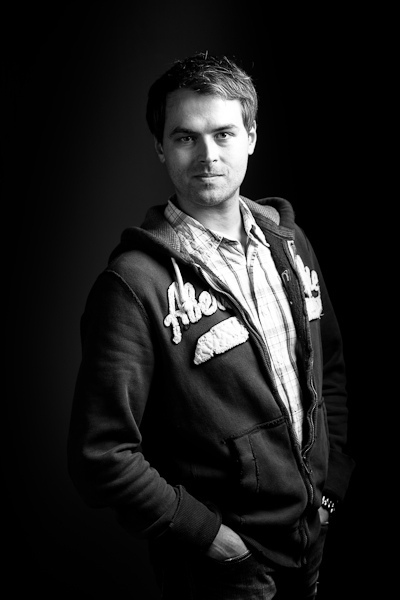
- Taneli Tikka in 2009
- Born: March 8, 1978 (age 48); Savitaipale, Finland
- Other name: Niko Taneli Tikka
- Education: Helsinki School of Economics
- Occupations: CEO, Angel investor
- Known for: Entrepreneurship, Blogging

Taneli Tikka (born 1978 Savitaipale, Finland) is a Finnish technology serial entrepreneur, and a keynote speaker in Finnish and International events.

== Media and early career ==
Tikka has been a frequent guest in the Finnish media, particularly on the morning TV program "Good Morning Finland" on the MTV3 channel. Tikka is the former CEO of IRC-Galleria (2006–2007) he was instrumental in the acquisition of IRC-Galleria by Sulake Corporation, the company behind Habbo Hotel. Previously Tikka has been CEO in several technology companies, notably at Magenta Sites (the hosting & IT services company behind the global distribution of the Star Wreck -movie, and also the long time hosting partner for Habbo Hotel), MobileCRM and Taika Technologies.

== Advisor, investor and board member ==
Tikka was an executive advisor to Stardoll in the very early days of the service. Currently Tikka acts as an angel investor in the technology sector. One of Tikka's investments was Muxlim, the world's largest social network for Muslims, but he later sold his stake back to the company. Tikka is also a former executive (COO) and owner of Dopplr, a company that Nokia acquired in September 2009. Lisa Sounio and Marko Ahtisaari are among Dopplr founders. In the spring of 2008 Tikka started developing a new social shopping startup RunToShop as its CEO. Tikka left RunToShop a year later in the spring of 2009. Tikka is one of the founders of Vakuutuskone.com (insurance and finance service) and acts as an advisor and board member in several technology companies, including: Balancion, Xiha Life, Umbra Software and 13 Holding (ENCA).

== Career and nominations ==
Tikka is a former director of the Finnish Software Entrepreneurs Association. In the summer of 2008 the Finnish governmental Funding Agency for Technology and Innovation (TEKES) appointed Tikka as a director of their Verso technology programme. In October 2009 Tikka was appointed as a Steering Group member of the Finnish governmental Vigo Programme by the minister of the economy Mr. Mauri Pekkarinen. F-Secure founder & chairman & Nokia Chairman & interim CEO Mr. Risto Siilasmaa heads the steering group. The programme's mission is to renew startup and growth company financing in Finland. In June 2010 a Donald Duck -based magazine AKU. (Donald) nominated Tikka as the Scrooge McDuck of Finland. In January 2011 Tikka was appointed as an Executive Vice President of NASDAQ OMX listed public company Soprano Plc, in charge of their web solutions division. Later in early 2012 Tikka was promoted to Chief Operating Officer of Soprano Plc. Later in 2012 Tikka resigned from Soprano, Plc. In March 2011 the Finnish Information Processing Association nominated Tikka as the opinion leader in ICT for 2010. This nomination has in the past been received by professors, members of parliament (Jyrki Kasvi) and large organization CEOs (Risto Siilasmaa) in Finland. It has a tradition extending from 1987 onwards to this date. In 2012 Tikka was commissioned by the Prime Minister's Office of Finland to work on the official government report on the future. As a member of the thematic group working on foresight of business regeneration. On September 10, 2013 Tikka announced from Beijing that TLD Registry, Ltd has been granted with two gTLD licenses for Chinese-language gTLDs by ICANN. The announcement was made with the Prime Minister of Finland Mr. Jyrki Katainen, Director General Li Junfeng of the NCSC, and Mr. Ville Niinistö the Minister of the Environment of Finland. Tikka is a co-founder and Chairman of the Board of TLD Registry, Ltd.

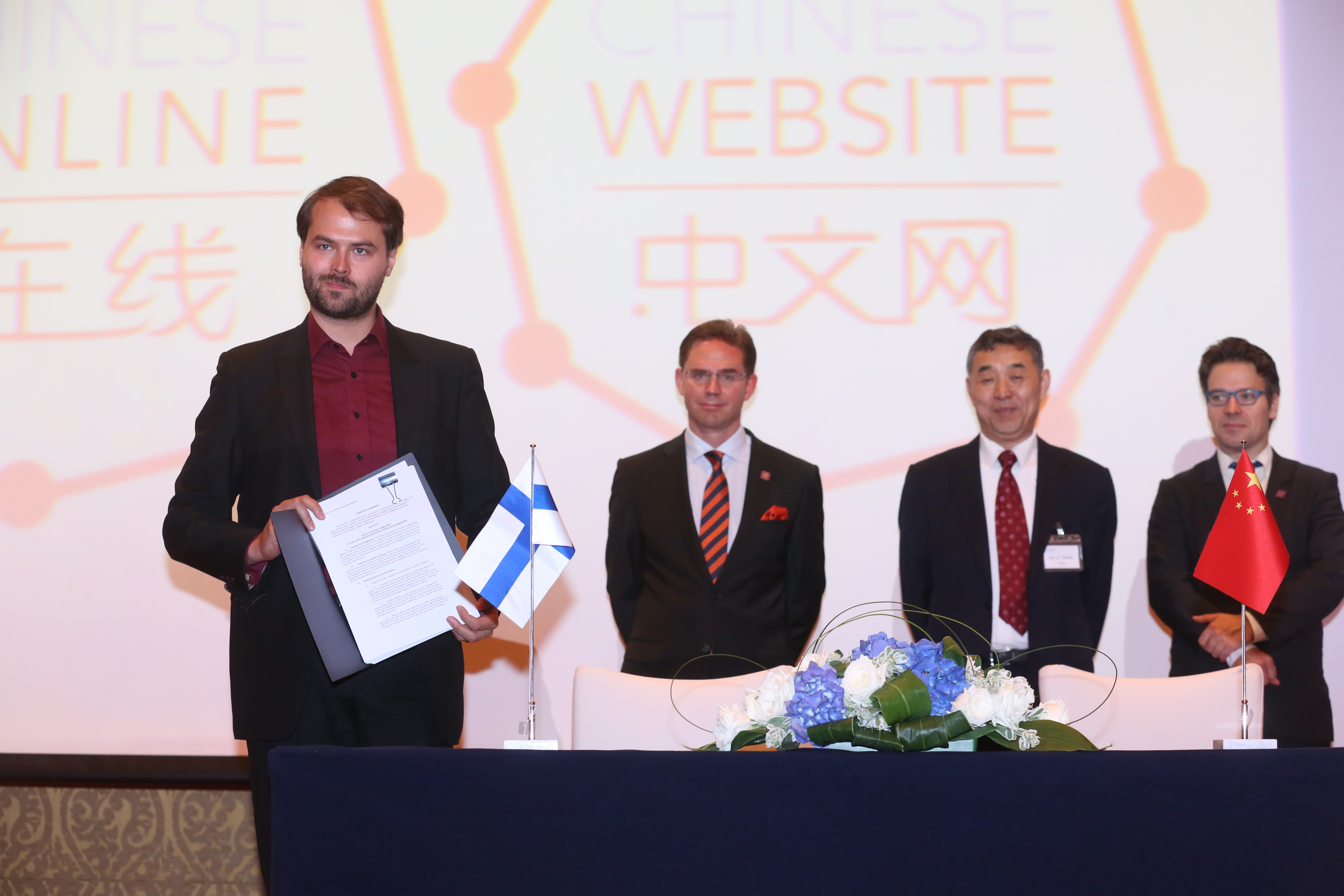
TLD Registry’s executive chairman Taneli Tikka announces the successful contracting with ICANN for Dot Chinese Online & Dot Chinese Website. The state ceremony in Beijing was witnessed by Finland’s prime minister Jyrki Katainen, China’s Director General, National Center for Climate Change Strategy Li Junfeng, and Finland’s Minister of the Environment Ville Niinistö

Tikka has studied at the Helsinki School of Economics, where he graduated 1st of his class of the 2004 Executive MBA .

Tikka writes a popular technology entrepreneurial blog at www.tane.li

== Personal life ==
Tikka was the first child of his Finnish mother and Georgian father.
