= Ville Miettinen =

Finnish serial entrepreneur and computer programmer

- Born: 5 June 1975 (age 51); Geneva, Switzerland
- Citizenship: Finland
- Education: University of Helsinki
- Occupations: CEO, Angel investor
- Known for: Entrepreneurship
- Relatives: Tuomas Vimma (Brother), Jorma K. Miettinen (Grandfather)

Ville Ilmari Miettinen (born 5 June 1975) is a Finnish serial entrepreneur and computer programmer. Miettinen was the co-founder and CTO of Hybrid Graphics, a graphics technology company acquired by NVIDIA in 2006. Miettinen is a founding partner at Lots, one of the accelerators in the Finnish governmental Vigo Programme. Miettinen is also the CEO and co-founder of the crowdsourcing technology company Microtask.

== Life and career ==
Miettinen was born in Geneva, Switzerland.

=== Entrepreneurship and venturing ===
Miettinen is the chairman of the board of the ACM SIGGRAPH Helsinki Chapter, an advisory board member of IGDA Finland, a referrer at the European pre-seed venture fund HackFwd, and a startup mentor at Aalto Venture Garage. He has held board seats in a number of graphics and gaming related companies, including Fake Graphics, Xiha, Recoil Games, Ardites (merged with Symbio), and Cowboy Rodeo. He is also a technical advisory board member at the fabless semiconductor company Movidius and a referrer with the European pre-seed investment company HackFwd.

=== Graphics industry technology focus ===
Miettinen was actively involved in the Khronos Group, participating in the standardization of OpenGL ES, OpenVG and OpenKODE, as well as in the Java Community Process where he contributed to the JSR-184, JSR-297, and JSR-239 standards. He is the co-author of the SurRender 3D engine and the dPVS occlusion culling middleware.

Miettinen is a frequent lecturer at various universities and industry events, such as Game Developers Conference, SIGGRAPH, EUROGRAPHICS and CrowdConf. He also contributes to different blogs related to crowdsourcing and entrepreneurship.

Miettinen is an avid hobbyist photographer.
