= Microtask =

Finnish technology company

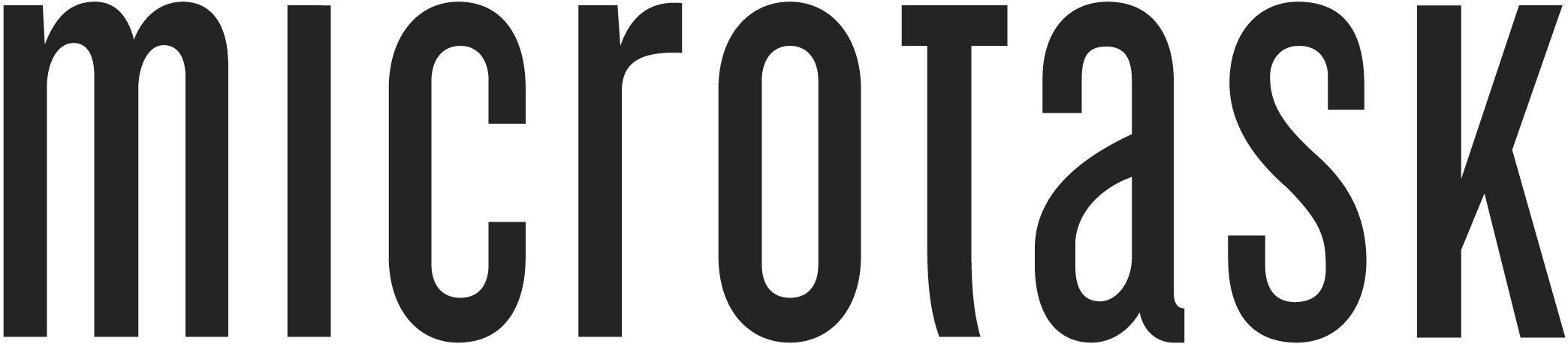
- Microtask logo
- Type: Private
- Industry: Crowdsourcing
- Founded: January 2009
- Founder: Ville Miettinen, Harri Holopainen, Otto Chrons, Panu Wilska
- Headquarters: Helsinki, Finland
- Website: microtask.com (now used by a different company)

Microtask was a Finnish technology company founded by Ville Miettinen, Harri Holopainen, Otto Chrons and Panu Wilska in 2009 to create a technology platform for crowdsourcing and distributed work. The company went bankrupt 2021.

The company was headquartered in Helsinki, and had offices in Tampere and San Francisco.

Microtask was selected as one of the finalists of the Nordic Tech Tour 2010.

== Products ==
Microtask Platform is a software platform for global distribution of short-duration tasks to online workers. The system supports automated quality assurance and provides service-level agreements for task quality and turnaround times. The most notable use case for such tasks has been human-assisted optical character recognition.

== People ==
CEO Ville Miettinen and Managing Director Harri Holopainen were co-founders of Hybrid Graphics, a Finnish graphics technology company acquired by NVIDIA in 2006. CTO Otto Chrons was the co-founder and CTO of Ionific (merged with Botnia Hightech and acquired by Sasken Communication Technologies).

The company is funded by private investors and the venture fund Sunstone Capital, which is represented by board member Nikolaj Nyholm, a Danish serial technology entrepreneur and investor.

== Customers ==
The National Library of Finland uses the Microtask Platform for outsourcing its digitization work to volunteers.
