= Crisis Management Initiative =

Finnish conflict resolution organization

Coordinates: 60.165904°N 24.9523°E

CMI – Martti Ahtisaari Peace Foundation
- Abbreviation: CMI
- Formation: 24 August 2000; 26 years ago
- Founder: Martti Ahtisaari
- Founded at: Helsinki, Finland
- Type: Non-governmental organisation
- Registration no.: 3187418-1
- Purpose: Conflict resolution
- Headquarters: Eteläranta 12, Helsinki
- Chairman: Marko Ahtisaari
- Budget: 9.5 million € (2020)
- Website: cmi.fi

CMI – Martti Ahtisaari Peace Foundation sr (in 2000–2021 Crisis Management Initiative ry) is an independent Finnish non-governmental organisation that works to prevent and resolve conflict through informal dialogue and mediation. Nobel Peace Prize laureate and former President of Finland Martti Ahtisaari founded CMI in 2000. CMI has offices in Helsinki and Brussels as well as a presence in selected countries. CMI transformed from an association to a foundation on 1 May 2021.

The foundation's operations are led by an eight-member board, with Marko Ahtisaari serving as the chairman.

== Function ==
CMI states it is focused on contributing to peace processes in four regions: the Middle East and North Africa, Eurasia, Sub-Saharan Africa and Asia. CMI states that it facilitates dialogue, mediates between conflicting sides, provides capacity-building and mediation support at all stages of conflict management and peace processes, and supports the broader peace building community. CMI is often approached in conflicts related to which it has regional expertise and contacts. The choice of mediation also depends on the political will of its financial backers to solve a particular conflict. CMI works either directly with the parties of the conflict, or assists another organization like the United Nations or the African Union in their mediating efforts. CMI conducts its mediating work behind the scenes and does not comment on ongoing negotiations. Sometimes even successful negotiations are kept secret.

CMI head offices are in Helsinki. The organization employs 80 staff. As of 2018, the annual budget of CMI was 7,3 million euros. It receives most of its funding, 55%, from the Finnish state. The European Union and other European countries are significant funders as well. In 2017, it campaigned to raise more than 600,000 euros from about 9,000 private donors as a surprise "birthday present" to Ahtisaari to fund more than 15 extra rounds of mediation talks.

== History ==
Nobel Peace laureate and former president of Finland Martti Ahtisaari founded CMI on 24 August 2000, the same year he became chairman of the International Crisis Group. After stepping down as the president of Finland that year, Ahtisaari declined the post of United Nations High Commissioner for Refugees because he wanted to focus instead on addressing the root causes of conflicts. President Ahtisaari's long-term vision with CMI was to contribute as effectively as possible to solving violent conflict throughout the world. The main tasks of the organisation in its early years were to assist Martti Ahtisaari in his numerous international assignments, to participate in policy discussions, and to advocate for capacity-building in civilian crisis management.

This led to CMI taking on its own projects, at first concerning crisis management and later on expanding to peace building and conflict resolution. One of CMI's most visible assignments, the Aceh peace process began in late 2004. CMI and its chairman president Ahtisaari were asked to facilitate talks between the government of Indonesia and the Free Aceh Movement (GAM).

In 2008, President Ahtisaari was awarded the Nobel Peace Prize "for his important efforts, on several continents and over more than three decades, to resolve international conflicts". In its announcement, the Norwegian Nobel Committee also recognized Ahtisaari and CMI's central role in the Aceh process as well as their work in mediating peace in Iraq in 2008.

CMI has mediated in South Sudan.

In 2014, CMI organized unofficial talks between conflict parties in Ukraine. It also worked for peace in Transnistria.

In 2017, CMI mediated between the government and opposition parties of the Burundian unrest. CMI also facilitated negotiations between Hamas, Fatah and other Palestinian groups. Because Hamas is classified as a terrorist group by many countries, CMI has been criticized for including them in talks. Because of the number of parties involved, it is difficult to assess the individual impact of CMI.

More lately, CMI has worked to increase the role of women in mediation, and been involved in mediation in the Yemeni Civil War.

In 2019, CMI removed all references to its employee and recently elected Member of Parliament of Finland, Hussein al-Taee, following his comparison of Israel to the Islamic State and representatives of the Simon Wiesenthal Center saying al-Taee's writings were "clearly antisemitic."

== Chairmen ==
- Martti Ahtisaari 2000–2017
- Alexander Stubb 2018–2024
- Marko Ahtisaari 2024–

== See also ==
- European Centre of Excellence for Countering Hybrid Threats
- Finnish Institute of International Affairs
- Swisspeace
