= CNBloggerCon =

- Status: Active
- Locations: Shanghai (Cancelled) (2010); Lianzhou (2009); Guangzhou (2008); Beijing (2007); Hangzhou (2006); Shanghai (2005)
- Inaugurated: 2005
- Website: http://www.cnbloggercon.org/

The Chinese Blogger Conference (or CNBloggerCon) was the first national bloggers conference held in China. The conference first convened in Shanghai in November 2005, and was held in the subsequent years in Hangzhou (2006), Beijing (2007), Guangzhou (2008) and Lianzhou (2009). One of the more prominent organizers of the conference is the Shanghai-based investment manager and blogger Isaac Mao.

CNBloggerCon 2010 was scheduled to be held in Shanghai on November 20, 2010, but the event was ultimately canceled by the organizers under pressure from Chinese government authorities. This marked the first time since 2005 that the Chinese Blogger Conference had not been held.
