= Lisa Sounio =

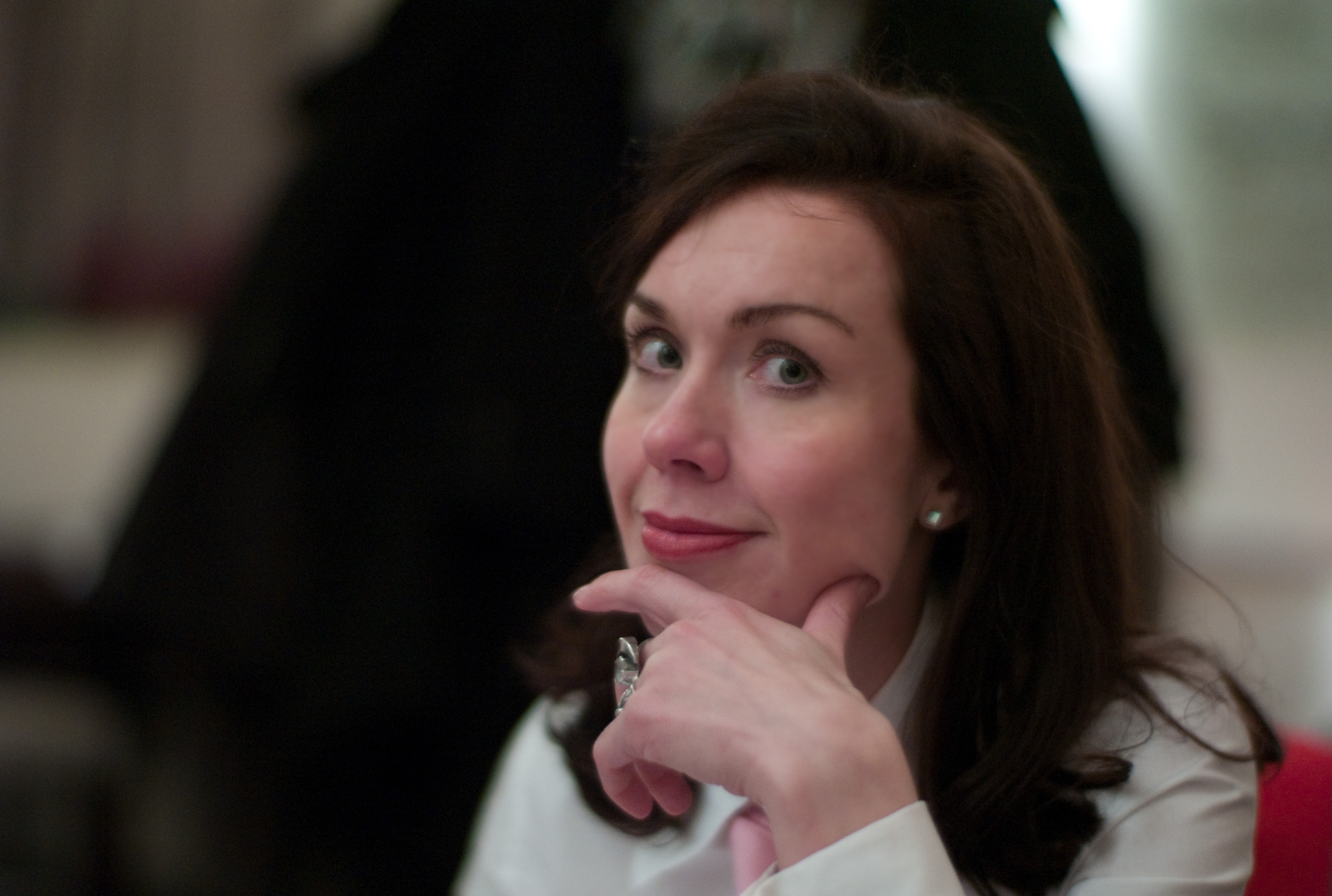
Lisa Sounio

Lisa Sounio (born 1970) is a past CEO and chairperson of the social networking site Dopplr. She is also the CEO of her own design management consultancy Sonay. She has a background in industrial design management. Early in her career she worked as a sales- and export manager for the Finnish furniture industry. Before becoming an entrepreneur she worked for Iittala where she was in charge of branding and product design development.

Sounio has a master's degree from the Helsinki School of Economics. She has also studied at the University of Art and Design Helsinki and at the Helsinki University of Technology. She is also a columnist and public speaker. Sounio was married to and a business partner of Marko Ahtisaari.

She was a candidate for the 2014 Finnish European Parliament election, on the National Coalition Party list, but was not elected.
