= Shaun Gregory =

British businessman

- Citizenship: British
- Education: Nottingham College; Wharton Business School; Hult International Business School
- Occupation: CEO of EMG Group (Euro Media Group)

Shaun Gregory is a British businessman, former CEO of BTI Studios and Iyuno Media Group, and now CEO of EMG / Euro Media Group.

== Education ==
- 1985-1988: Nottingham College
- 1999-2000: Wharton Business School
- 2001: Ashridge Business School (part of Hult International Business School)

== Career ==
Gregory joined EMG as group CEO in 2021, then named Euro Media Group, a provider of broadcast services and media solutions. In 2022 the company was re-branded to EMG.

Prior to being CEO of EMG, Gregory was CEO at Iyuno Media Group. On 12 September 2019 BTI Studios and Iyuno Media Group announced the merge of the two companies, who became one under the Iyuno Media Group brand.

Gregory was CEO at Exterion Media providing leadership for their operations, setting the strategic direction and framework for their growth. He was also Managing Director of Telefónica Digital’s global advertising business, providing leadership to new, developing and established media businesses across the globe. Prior to this role Gregory worked with the UK Executive team to help transform O2 into a connectivity service brand. Gregory also underpinned the launch of Priority Moments in the UK, now rolled out into other countries across Telefónica.

Prior to this Gregory was Chief Executive of Blyk. He worked alongside Pekka Ala-Pietilä, the former president of Nokia to launch their advertiser funded mobile network. He was also responsible for the strategy and fundraising of the UK business. Before moving into mobile, he was Director of New media at Telegraph Media Group.

== Additional affiliations and memberships ==
Alongside his full-time executive role at Telefónica, Gregory has participated in a number of early stage, start up and interesting businesses. He has been a non-executive director on boards, including WEVE, Telefónica's WAYRA, Ocean Outdoor, Bliss Media and Proxama. He has also been on a number of trade bodies, including the Advertising Association and has help shape advertising policy in the UK.
