= Hussein al-Taee =

Finnish politician

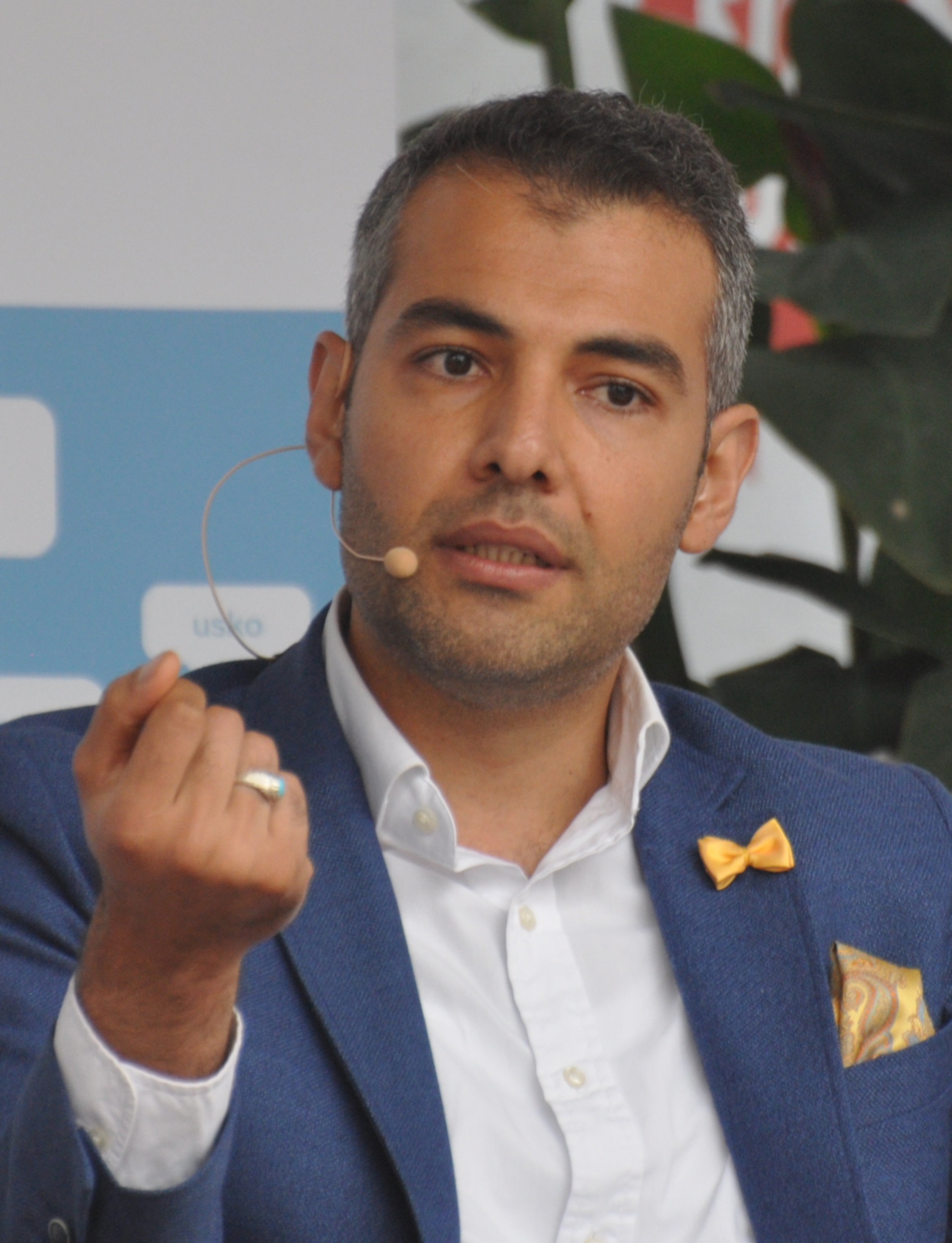
Hussein al-Taee in July 2016

Hussein al-Taee (Arabic: حسين الطائي, romanized: Ḥusayn aṭ-Ṭā’ī; born 19 May 1983) is a Finnish politician who served in the Parliament of Finland for the Social Democratic Party of Finland at the Uusimaa constituency between 2019 - 2023.

Al-Taee has a strong background in peace building and mediation. Previously he worked as an advisor at the Finnish peace broker organization Crisis Management Initiative (CMI).

Al-Taee holds a master's degree in international management.

== Early life ==
Al-Taee was born in Baghdad. He moved to Finland as a quota refugee in 1993.

== Political career ==
Al-Taee was elected to the Parliament on SDP's ticket in parliamentary elections 2019. al-Taee is a member of Commerce Committee and Environment Committee in Parliament. He also serves in Fortum's Stakeholder Advisory Board.

After the elections, civil rights activist Anter Yaşa published on his blog screenshots of al-Taee's writings on Facebook. Iltalehti and The Jerusalem Post claimed that Yaşa assume al-Taee's posts are pro-Iran and antisemitic. Al-Taee has worked as an administrator of the "Gazan sota - Lähi-idän tilanne - uutisseuranta" named Facebook group.

Finnish media, like STT, has tried to find if the screenshots are true. Al-Taee denied his posts and called them as a smear attack. He stated that he recognizes part of his posts as his own, but does not remember written all of his old postings. CMI stated that those posts were falsified. Later al-Taee recognized that those screenshots were in fact real.

== Personal life ==
Al-Taee is married and has three children.
