= Freesouls =

Book by Joi Ito

- Original cover
- Author: Joi Ito
- Language: English
- Publisher: Freesouls.cc
- Publication date: 2008
- Publication place: United States
- Media type: Print (Hardcover and Paperback
- Pages: 200
- ISBN: 0982029128

FREESOULS: Captured and Released by Joi Ito is a book by Joi Ito featuring 296 photographic portraits of members of the free culture movement. The project began in 2007 as way for Ito to freely distribute, through a Creative Commons Attribution license (CC BY), quality photos of the free culture community without the hindrance of copyright or permission. Freesouls also includes eight essays by major figures in the free culture movement, including Howard Rheingold, Lawrence Liang, Cory Doctorow, Isaac Mao, Christopher Adams, Yochai Benkler, Marko Ahtisaari, and a foreword by Lawrence Lessig. Isaac Mao's essay, "Sharism: A Mind Revolution", introduces Sharism for the first time.

The book was published in three editions, as a box set in an edition of 50, a soft-cover book in a print run of 1024, and a regular release. It was edited by Christopher Adams and Sophie Chang.

== Essay content ==
1. Lawrence Lessig: Foreword by Lawrence Lessig
2. Christopher Adams: Share this book
3. Joi Ito: Just another free soul
4. Howard Rheingold: Participative Pedagogy for a Literacy of Literacies
5. Lawrence Liang: Free as in Soul: The Anti-image Politics of Copyright
6. Cory Doctorow: You Can't Own Knowledge
7. Yochai Benkler: Complexity and Humanity
8. Isaac Mao: Sharism: A Mind Revolution
9. Marko Ahtisaari: Intelligent Travel
