= Martti Ahtisaari =

Finnish politician and diplomat, President of Finland (1937–2023)

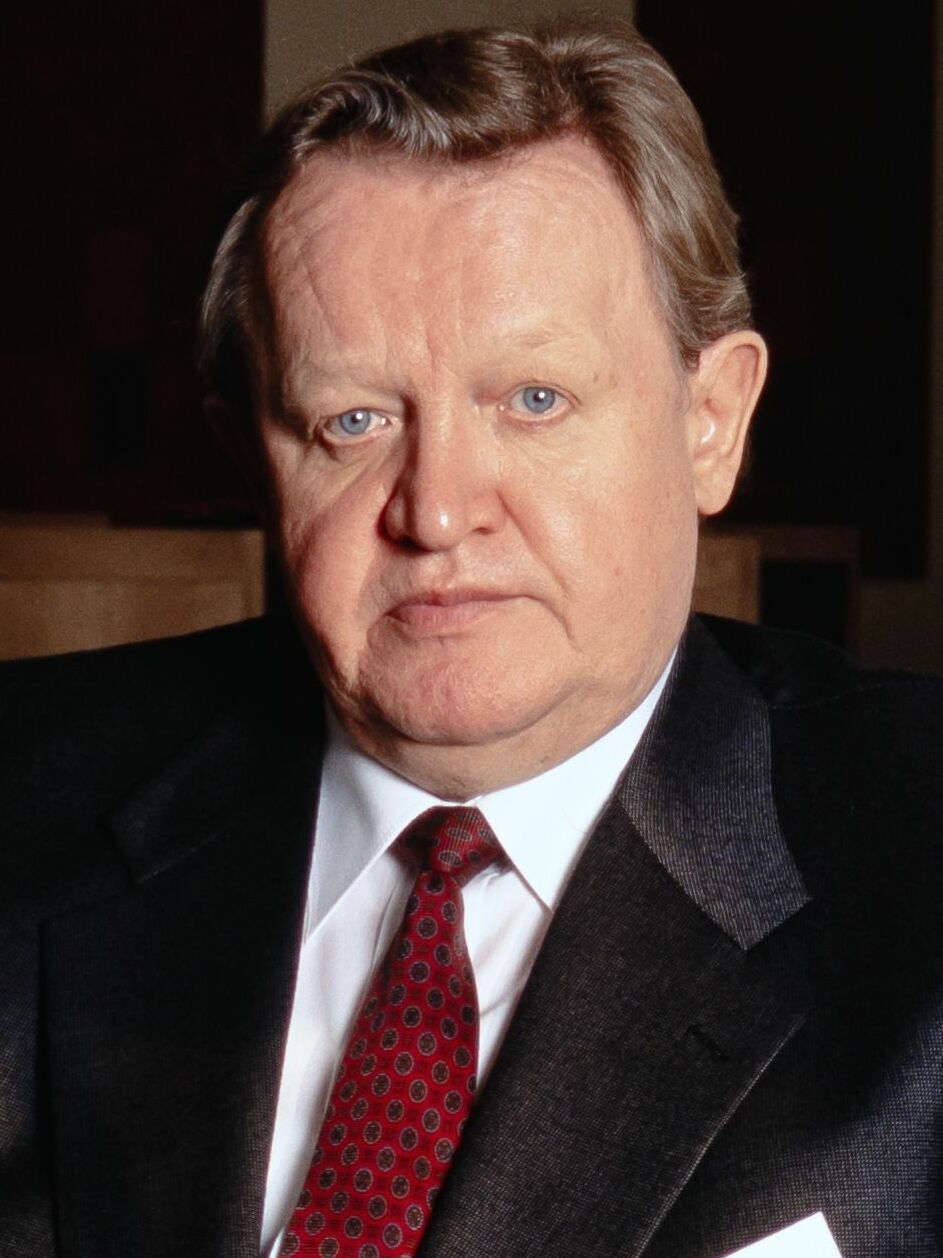
- Ahtisaari in 1994

10th President of Finland
- In office 1 March 1994 – 1 March 2000
- Prime Minister: Esko Aho; Paavo Lipponen
- Preceded by: Mauno Koivisto
- Succeeded by: Tarja Halonen

Ambassador of Finland to Tanzania
- In office 1973–1977
- Preceded by: Seppo Pietinen
- Succeeded by: Richard Müller

Personal details
- Born: Martti Oiva Kalevi Ahtisaari; 23 June 1937 Viipuri, Finland (now Vyborg, Russia)
- Died: 16 October 2023 (aged 86) Helsinki, Finland
- Resting place: Hietaniemi Cemetery, Helsinki
- Party: Social Democratic
- Spouse: Eeva Hyvärinen (m. 1968)
- Children: Marko
- Education: University of Oulu
- Awards: Nobel Peace Prize (2008)

Military service
- Branch/service: Finnish Army
- Rank: Captain

Martti Oiva Kalevi Ahtisaari (Note: Finnish pronunciation: [ˈmɑrtːi (ˈoi̯ʋɑ ˈkɑleʋi) ˈɑhtisɑːri]) (23 June 1937 – 16 October 2023) was a Finnish politician and diplomat who was the president of Finland from 1994 to 2000. He was Finland's Ambassador to Tanzania from 1973 to 1977 and United Nations Commissioner for Namibia from 1977 to 1981. Noted for his international peace work, he received the Nobel Peace Prize in 2008.

Ahtisaari was a United Nations special envoy for Kosovo, charged with organizing the Kosovo status process negotiations. These negotiations aimed to resolve a long-running dispute in Kosovo, which later declared its independence from Serbia in 2008. In October 2008, he was awarded the Nobel Peace Prize "for his important efforts, on several continents and over more than three decades, to resolve international conflicts". The Nobel statement said that Ahtisaari had played a prominent role in resolving serious and long-lasting conflicts, including ones in Namibia, Aceh (Indonesia), Kosovo and Serbia, and Iraq.

== Youth and early career ==
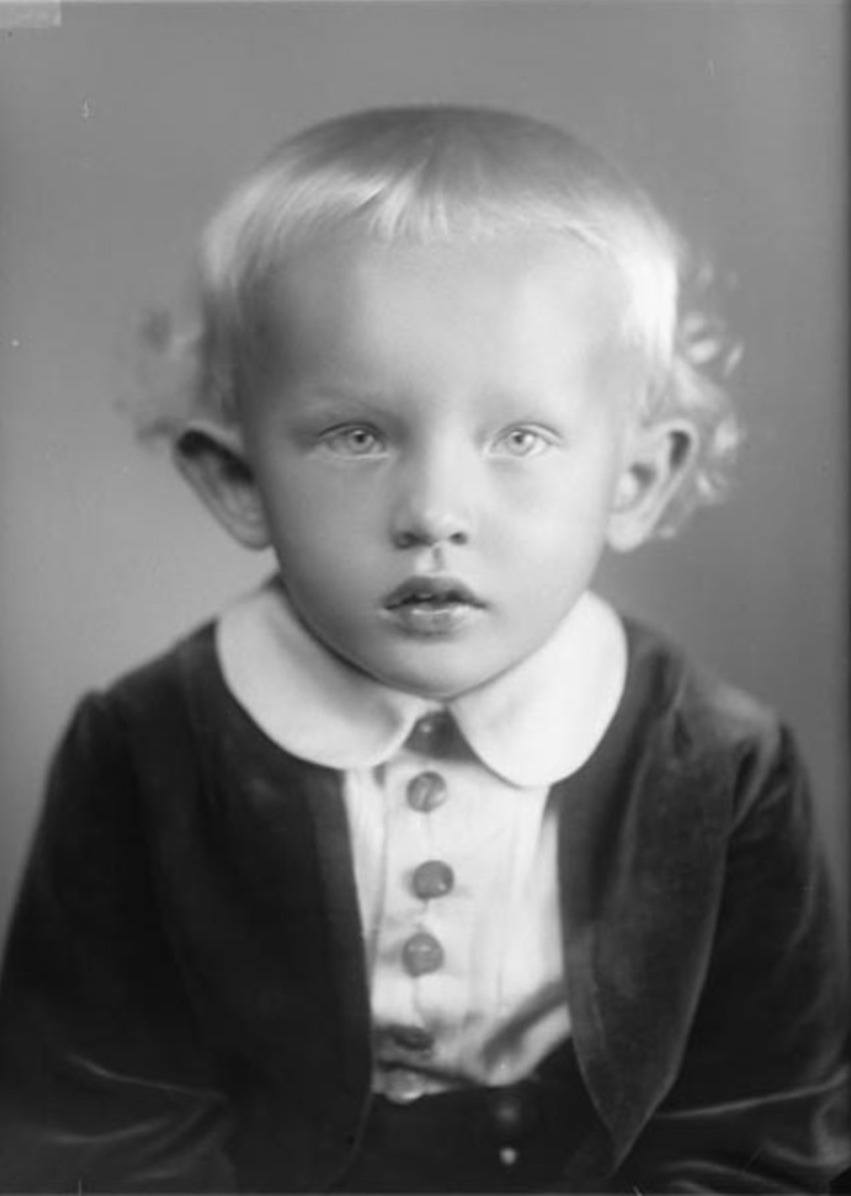
4-year-old Ahtisaari, pictured on his birthday

Martti Ahtisaari was born in Viipuri, Finland (now Vyborg, Russia) on 23 June 1937. His father, Oiva Ahtisaari, whose grandfather Julius Marenius Adolfsen had emigrated with his parents to Kotka, Finland in 1872 from Tistedalen in Southern Norway, took Finnish citizenship in 1929 and Finnicized his surname from Adolfsen in 1935. Oiva was working as a NCO in the supply troops in Viipuri when Martti was born.

The Continuation War (World War II) took Oiva Ahtisaari to the front as a non-commissioned officer army mechanic, while Martti's mother, Tyyne, moved to Kuopio with her son to escape immediate danger from the war in 1940. Kuopio was where Ahtisaari spent most of his childhood, eventually attending Kuopion Lyseo high school.

In 1952, Martti Ahtisaari moved to Oulu with his family. There he continued his education in high school, graduating in 1956. He also joined the local YMCA. After completing his military service (Ahtisaari held the rank of captain in the Finnish Army Reserve), he began to study at Oulu teachers' college, attending the two-year course which enabled him to qualify as a primary-school teacher in 1959.

In the summer of 1960, Ahtisaari signed the contract for the position of director of the Swedish Agency for International Development physical education boarding school in Karachi, Pakistan, after interviewing in Sweden and hearing about the offer announced by the YMCA in April of that year. There, he also trained as a teacher.

He returned to Finland in 1963 and began his studies in the Helsinki School of Economics and soon became the Executive Director of the Helsinki International Student Club and Student International Aid, where he made friends with Namibian Nickey Iyambo. He also joined the international students' organisation AIESEC. In 1965, he joined the Ministry for Foreign Affairs in its Bureau for International Development Aid, to set up the International Development Assistance Office together with Jaakko Iloniemi, which was a pioneering office, as the Finnish presence in international cooperation in the Third World was non-existent. Ahtisaari remained in that office until 1972, where he served from 1971 as assistant to the director, a position he combined with his presence on the Government's Advisory Committee for Trade and Industry Affairs of Developing Countries.

== Diplomatic career ==
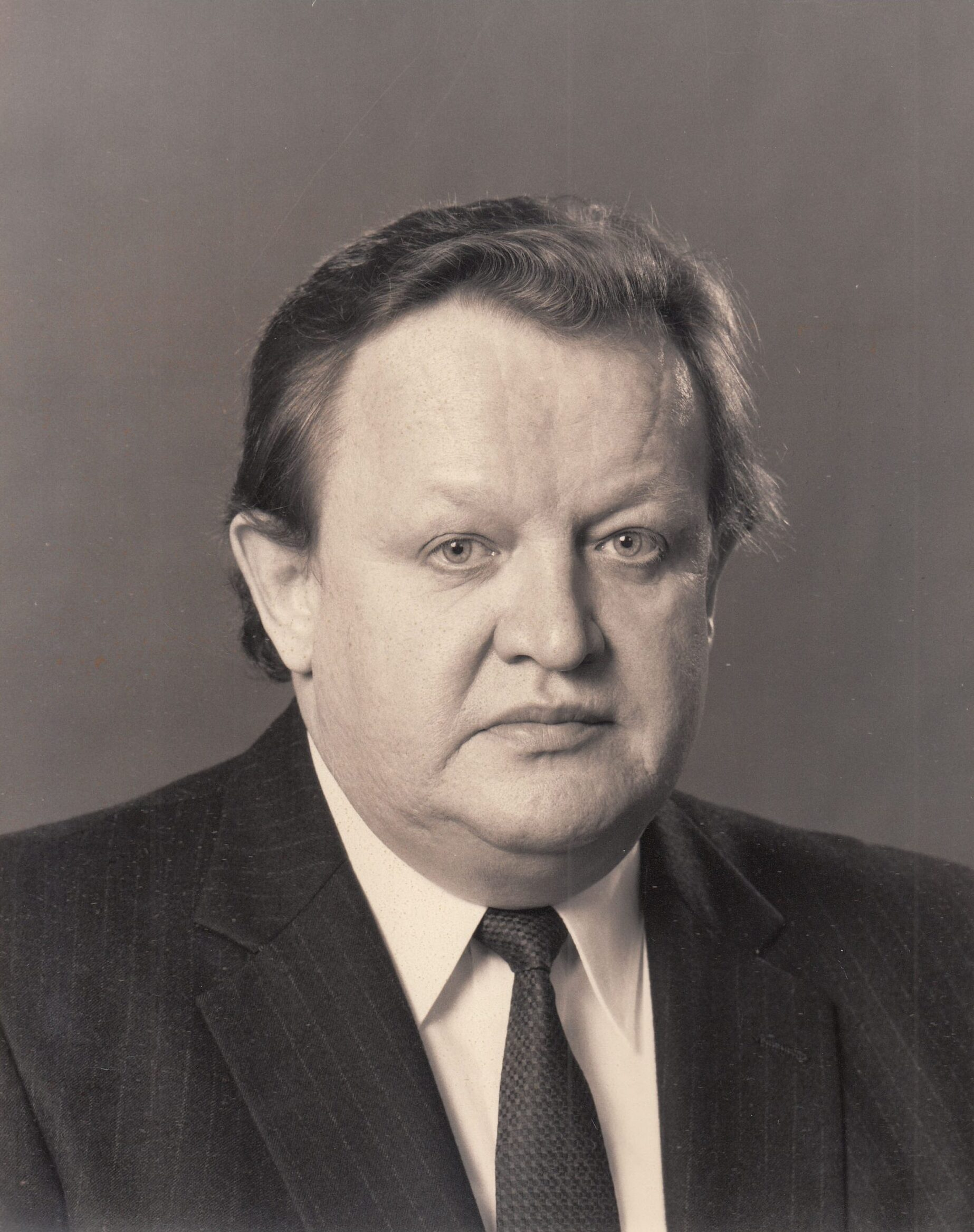
Ahtisaari as a United Nations Under-Secretary-General, 1987

=== In the Namibian independence transition ===
Ahtisaari began his diplomatic career in 1973 when he became Finland's Ambassador to Tanzania, Zambia, Somalia and Mozambique, an office he held until 1977. This new mission allowed him to get closer to East African affairs, monitoring from Dar es Salaam the independence process of Namibia and maintaining close contacts with South West Africa People's Organisation (SWAPO). In 1977 he was recalled by the United Nations to succeed Seán MacBride as United Nations Commissioner for Namibia, a post he held until 1981, and as representative of Secretary-General Kurt Waldheim from 1978.

Following the death of a later UN Commissioner for Namibia, Bernt Carlsson, on Pan Am Flight 103 on 21 December 1988 – on the eve of the signing of the Tripartite Accord at UN Headquarters – Ahtisaari was sent to Namibia in April 1989 as the UN Special Representative to head the United Nations Transition Assistance Group (UNTAG). Because of the illegal incursion of SWAPO troops from Angola, the South African appointed Administrator-General (AG), Louis Pienaar, sought Ahtisaari's agreement to the deployment of SADF troops to stabilize the situation. Ahtisaari took advice from British prime minister Margaret Thatcher, who was visiting the region at the time, and approved the SADF deployment. A period of intense fighting ensued when at least 375 SWAPO insurgents were killed. In July 1989, Glenys Kinnock and Tessa Blackstone of the British Council of Churches visited Namibia and reported: "There is a widespread feeling that too many concessions were made to South African personnel and preferences and that Martti Ahtisaari was not forceful enough in his dealings with the South Africans."

Perhaps because of his reluctance to authorise this SADF deployment, Ahtisaari was alleged to have been targeted by the South African Civil Cooperation Bureau (CCB). According to a hearing in September 2000 of the South African Truth and Reconciliation Commission, two CCB operatives (Kobus le Roux and Ferdinand Barnard) were tasked not to kill Ahtisaari, but to give him "a good hiding". To carry out the assault, Barnard had planned to use the grip handle of a metal saw as a knuckleduster. In the event, Ahtisaari did not attend the meeting at the Keetmanshoop Hotel, where Le Roux and Barnard lay in wait for him, and thus Ahtisaari escaped injury.

After the independence elections of 1989, Ahtisaari and his wife were made honorary Namibian citizens in 1992. South Africa gave him the O R Tambo award for "his outstanding achievement as a diplomat and commitment to the cause of freedom in Africa and peace in the world".

Ahtisaari served as UN undersecretary-general for administration and management from 1987 to 1991 causing mixed feelings inside the organisation during an internal investigation of massive fraud. When Ahtisaari revealed in 1990 that he had secretly lengthened the grace period allowing UN officials to return misappropriated taxpayer money from the original three months to three years, the investigators were furious. The 340 officials found guilty of fraud were able to return money even after their crime had been proven. The harshest punishment was the firing of twenty corrupt officials.

=== Other roles ===
On 31 July 1991, he was appointed Secretary of State at the Ministry for Foreign Affairs of Finland in the Esko Aho's government. After the Gulf War, Ahtisaari headed a team tasked with reporting to the UN on changes in the situation and humanitarian needs. The report did not meet these expectations and was believed to have eroded American support for Ahtisaari's candidacy for the UN Secretary-General.

Between 1992 and 1993, Ahtisaari chaired the UN Conference on Yugoslavia's Working Group on Bosnia and Herzegovina and became the special assistant to Cyrus Vance, the Special Envoy of the Secretary-General of the United Nations for Croatia.

== President of Finland (1994–2000) ==
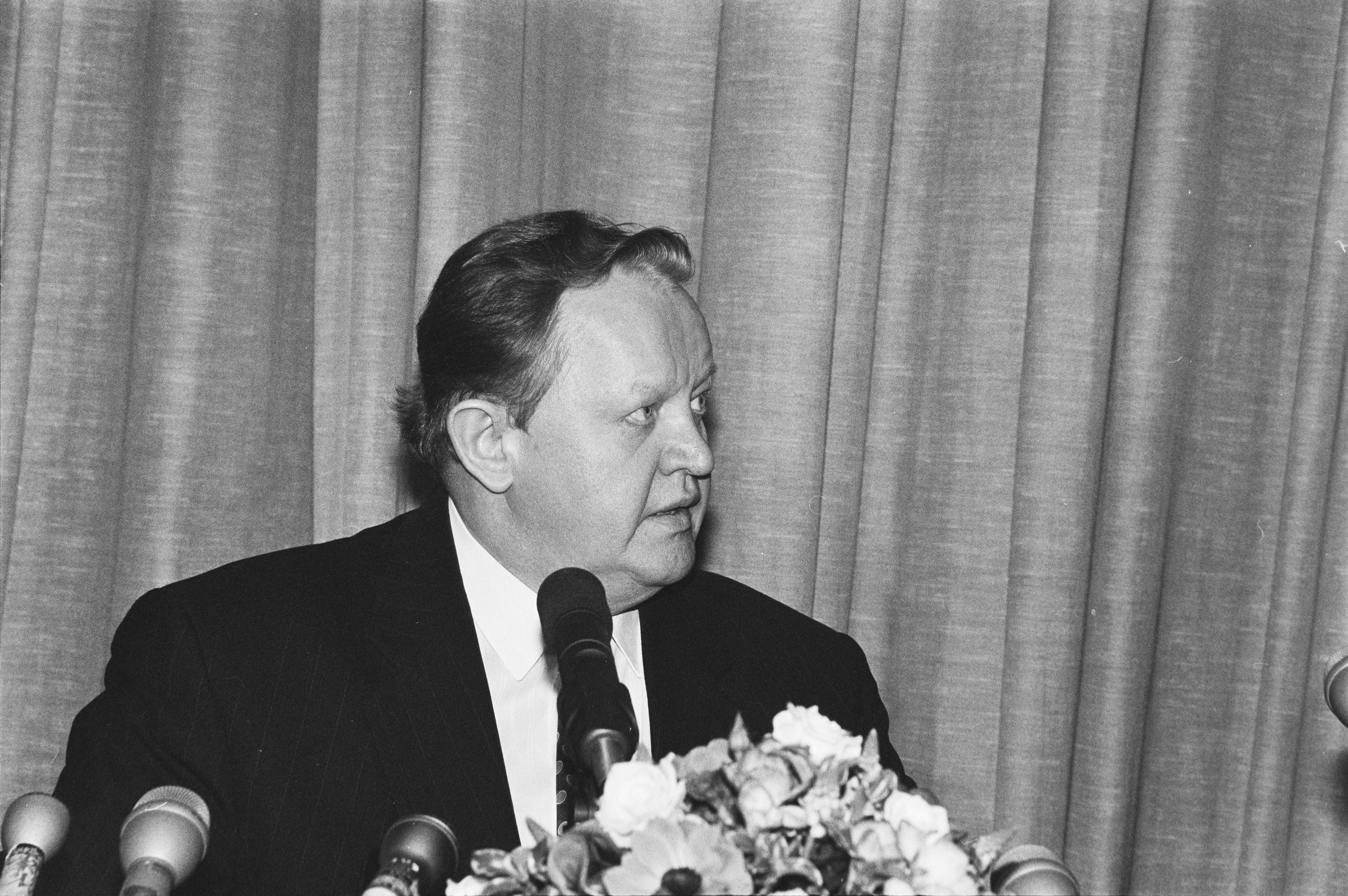
Ahtisaari holding a press conference during the 1994 presidential election

Finland's president Mauno Koivisto and his successor Martti Ahtisaari in 1994

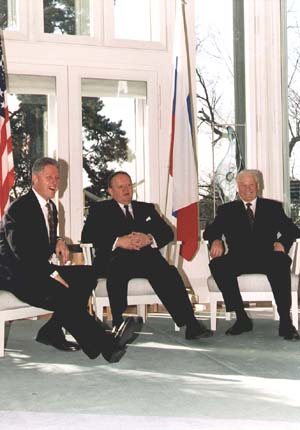
Ahtisaari with Bill Clinton and Boris Yeltsin in 1997

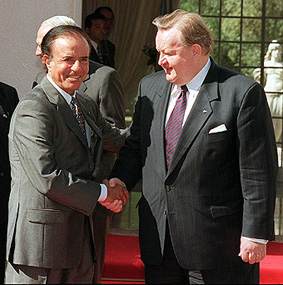
Ahtisaari with Carlos Menem in 1997

Finland's ongoing recession caused established political figures to lose public support, and the presidential elections were now direct instead of being conducted through an electoral college. The Social Democratic Party of Finland's candidate to succeed Mauno Koivisto as President of Finland was decided in a primary between Ahtisaari and former Prime Minister and diplomat Kalevi Sorsa. Ahtisaari led in the polls against Sorsa, who was already a popular and experienced politician and won the primaries on 16 May 1993 with 61% of the votes.

After the primaries, Ahtisaari returned to his work in Geneva, and did not start his presidential campaign until the end of October. Ahtisaari narrowly won over his second round opponent, Elisabeth Rehn of the Swedish People's Party. During the campaign, there were rumours spread by some political opponents of Ahtisaari that he had a drinking problem or that he had knowingly accepted a double salary from the Finnish Foreign Ministry and from the United Nations while trying to negotiate an end to the Bosnian War. Ahtisaari denied both allegations and no firm proof of them has emerged. During the three-week campaign between the two rounds of presidential elections, Ahtisaari was praised by his supporters for being more compassionate towards the many unemployed Finns than Rehn, who as Defence Minister had to officially support the Aho government's strict economic policies. A minor controversy arose during a town hall-style presidential debate in Lappeenranta, southeastern Finland when an apparently born-again Christian woman in the audience asked Rehn what her relationship with Jesus was. Rehn replied that she had personally no proof that Jesus had been a historical person. Ahtisaari ducked a precise answer by stating that he trusted the Lutheran confession even on this issue. He was sworn in on 1 March 1994.

His term as president began with a schism within the Centre Party government led by prime minister Esko Aho, who did not approve of Ahtisaari's being actively involved in foreign policy. There was also some controversy over Ahtisaari's speaking out on domestic issues such as unemployment. He travelled extensively in Finland and abroad, and was nicknamed "Matka-Mara" ("Travel-Mara", Mara being a common diminutive form of Martti). His monthly travels throughout the country and his meetings with ordinary citizens (the so-called maakuntamatkat or "provincial trips") nonetheless greatly enhanced his political popularity. Ahtisaari kept his campaign promise to visit one Finnish historical province every month during his presidency. He also donated some thousands of Finnish marks per month to the unemployed people's organisations, and a few thousand Finnish marks to the Christian social organisation of the late lay preacher and social worker Veikko Hursti.

Ahtisaari favoured pluralism and religious tolerance publicly. Privately, he and his wife practised their Christian faith. Contrary to some of his predecessors and his successor as the Finnish President, Ahtisaari ended all of his New Year's speeches by wishing the Finnish people God's blessing.

In January 1998 Ahtisaari was criticized by some NGOs, politicians and notable cultural figures because he awarded Commander of the Order of the Lion of Finland to the Forest Minister of Indonesia and to the main owner of the Indonesian RGM Company, a parent company of the April Company. The April Company was criticized by non-governmental organisations for destroying rain forests, and Indonesia itself was criticized heavily for human rights violations, especially in East Timor. Ahtisaari's party chairman Erkki Tuomioja said that giving medals was questionable since he feared the act may tarnish the public image of Finnish human rights policy. Students of the arts had demonstrations in Helsinki against the decision to give medals.

President Ahtisaari publicly supported Finland's entry into the European Union, and in a 1994 referendum, 57 percent of Finnish voters were in favour of EU membership. He later stated that if Finland had not voted to join the EU he would have resigned. The promotion of a European collective security system and Nordic cooperation, as well as a security policy without membership of NATO, were central to Ahtisaari's foreign policy.

During Ahtisaari's term as president, Boris Yeltsin and Bill Clinton met in Helsinki. He also negotiated alongside Viktor Chernomyrdin with Slobodan Milošević to end the fighting in the Yugoslav province of Kosovo in 1999.

Ahtisaari's lack of restrained involvement in public affairs and his pronouncements on domestic and economic policy provoked reservations both in Parliament itself and in the Social Democratic Party of Finland, and led Ahtisaari not to stand for re-election in 2000, which was announced in April 1999, and also alleged that two members of the SDP also ran as candidates. Ahtisaari was the last "strong president", before the 2000 constitution reduced the president's powers. He was succeeded by Tarja Halonen on 1 March 2000.

== Post-presidential life ==
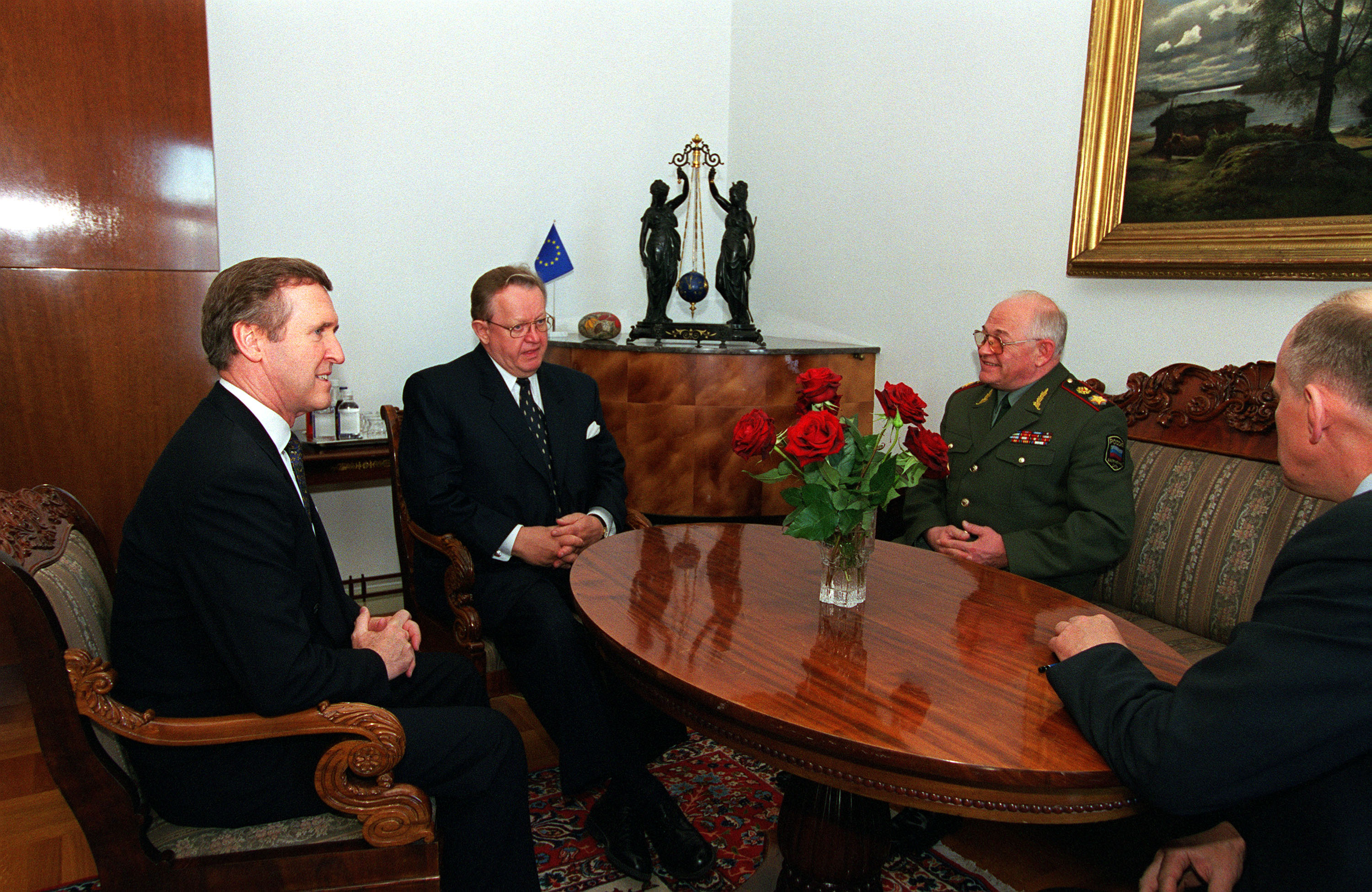
Ahtisaari mediating the Kosovo crisis with U.S. and Russian defence ministers in 1999

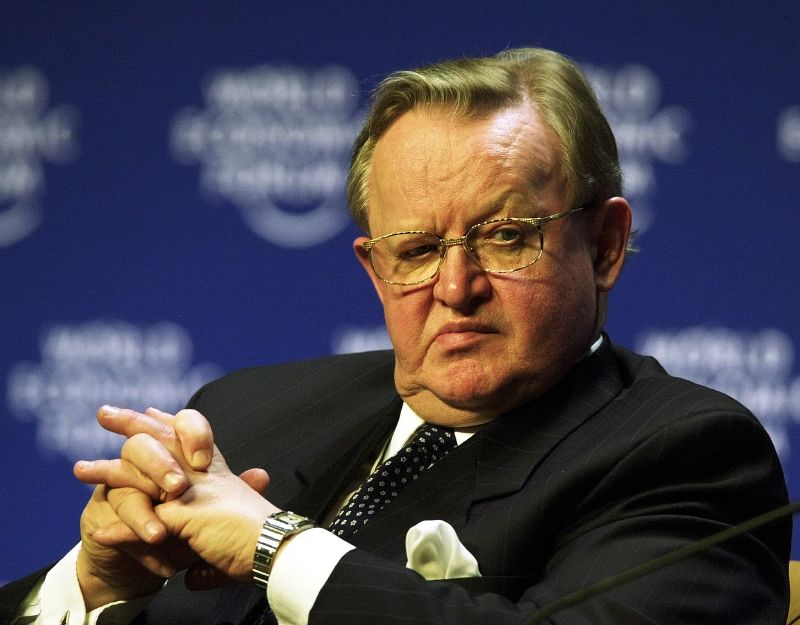
Martti Ahtisaari at the World Economic Forum in 2000

In Finnish politics, Ahtisaari long stressed how important it is for Finland to join NATO. Ahtisaari argued that Finland should be a full member of NATO and the EU in order "to shrug off once and for all the burden of Finlandization". He believed politicians should file an application and make Finland a member. He said that the way Finnish politicians avoided expressing their opinions was disturbing. He also noted that the so-called "NATO option" (acquiring membership if Finland were to be threatened) was an illusion, making an analogy to trying to obtain fire insurance when the fire has already started. Finland joined NATO on 4 April 2023, while Ahtisaari was still alive.

After leaving office, Ahtisaari held positions in various international organisations. In 2000, he became Chairman of the Brussels-based International Crisis Group, an NGO to which he committed $100,000 in government funding in 1994 one month after becoming elected President of Finland. He remained Chairman Emeritus.

Ahtisaari also founded the independent Crisis Management Initiative (CMI) with the goal of developing and sustaining peace in troubled areas. On 1 December 2000, Ahtisaari was awarded the J. William Fulbright Prize for International Understanding by the Fulbright Association in recognition of his work as a peacemaker in some of the world's most troubled areas. In May 2017 Ahtisaari suggested as new CMI leader Alexander Stubb, a former Prime Minister and future President of Finland, representing Finnish conservatives i.e. the National Coalition Party.

In 2000–01, Ahtisaari and Cyril Ramaphosa inspected IRA weapons dumps for the Independent International Commission on Decommissioning, as part of the Northern Ireland peace process.

In 2003 Ahtisaari defended George W. Bush's attack to Iraq, describing it as humanitarian intervention, which incited criticism from professor of history Juha Sihvola.

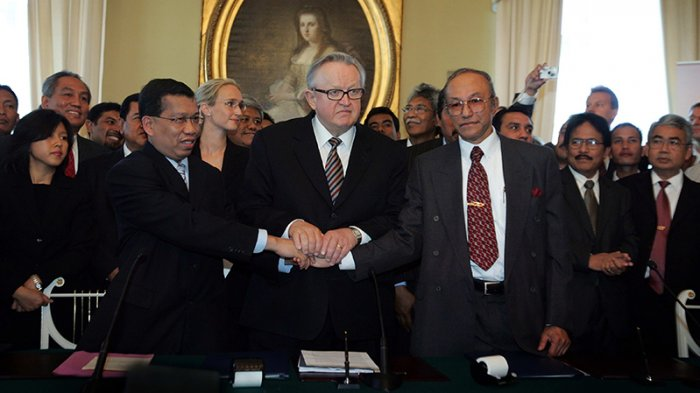
Agreement to end insurgency in Aceh signed in Helsinki, 2005

In November 2005, UN Secretary-General Kofi Annan appointed Ahtisaari as Special Envoy for the Kosovo status process which was to determine whether Kosovo, having been administered by the United Nations since 1999, should become independent or remain a province of Serbia. In early 2006, Ahtisaari opened the UN Office of the Special Envoy for Kosovo (UNOSEK) in Vienna, Austria, from where he conducted the Kosovo status negotiations. Those opposed to Ahtisaari's settlement proposal, which involved an internationally monitored independence for Kosovo, sought to discredit him. Allegations made by Balkan media sources of corruption and improper conduct by Ahtisaari were described by US State Department spokesman Tom Casey as "spurious", adding that Ahtisaari's plan is the "best solution possible" and has the "full endorsement of the United States". The New York Times suggested that this criticism of Ahtisaari on the part of the Serbs had led to the "bogging down" of the Kosovo status talks. In November 2008, Serbian media reported Pierre Mirel, director of the EU enlargement commission's western Balkans division as saying: "The EU has accepted that the deployment of EULEX has to be approved by the United Nations Security Council, and that the mission has to be neutral and will not be related to the Ahtisaari plan," Mirel said, following his meeting with Serbia's vice-president Bozidar Djelic.

In July 2007, however, when the EU, Russia and the United States agreed to find a new format for the talks, Ahtisaari announced that he regarded his mission as over. Since neither the UN nor the troika had asked him to continue mediations in the face of Russia's persistent refusal to support independence for Kosovo, he said he would nonetheless be willing to take on "a role as consultant", if requested. After a period of uncertainty and mounting tension, Kosovo unilaterally declared its independence from Serbia in February 2008.

In his work, he emphasised the importance of the United States in the peace process, stating that "There can be no peace without America."

Ahtisaari was chairman of the Interpeace Governing Council from 2000 to 2009. Beginning in 2009, Ahtisaari was Chairman Emeritus and a Special Advisor.

Ahtisaari was board director of the ImagineNations Group.

That same year he received the 2007 UNESCO Félix Houphouët-Boigny Peace Prize, for "his lifetime contribution to world peace".

In September 2009 Ahtisaari joined The Elders, a group of independent global leaders who work together on peace and human rights issues. He travelled to the Korean Peninsula with fellow Elders Gro Harlem Brundtland, Jimmy Carter and Mary Robinson in April 2011, and to South Sudan with Robinson and Archbishop Desmond Tutu in July 2012.

He was also a member of the board of the European Council on Foreign Relations.

=== Nobel Peace Prize ===
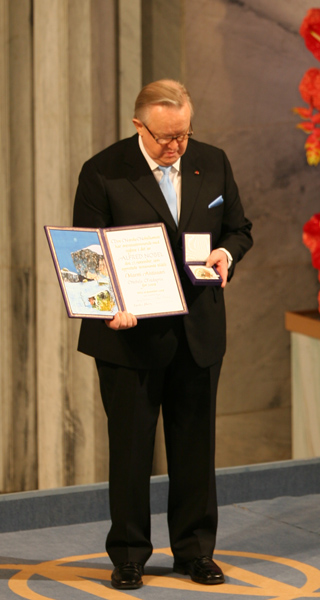
Nobel Peace Prize 2008

On 10 October 2008, Ahtisaari was announced as that year's recipient of the Nobel Peace Prize. Ahtisaari received the prize on 10 December 2008 at Oslo City Hall in Norway. Ahtisaari twice worked to find a solution in Kosovo – first in 1999 and again between 2005 and 2007. The committee said he also worked with others this year to find a peaceful solution to the problems in Iraq. According to the committee, Ahtisaari and his group, Crisis Management Initiative (CMI), also contributed to resolving other conflicts in Northern Ireland, Central Asia, and the Horn of Africa. Ahtisaari invited Prime Minister Matti Vanhanen, Foreign Affairs Minister Alexander Stubb and others to his Nobel event, but not President Halonen.

According to the memoir of the former secretary of the Norwegian Nobel Committee, Geir Lundestad, former Foreign Minister and UN ambassador Keijo Korhonen, who was strongly against awarding the 2008 Nobel Peace Prize to Ahtisaari, wrote a letter to the committee which negatively portrayed Ahtisaari as a person and his merits in international conflict zones.

=== Syria conflict ===
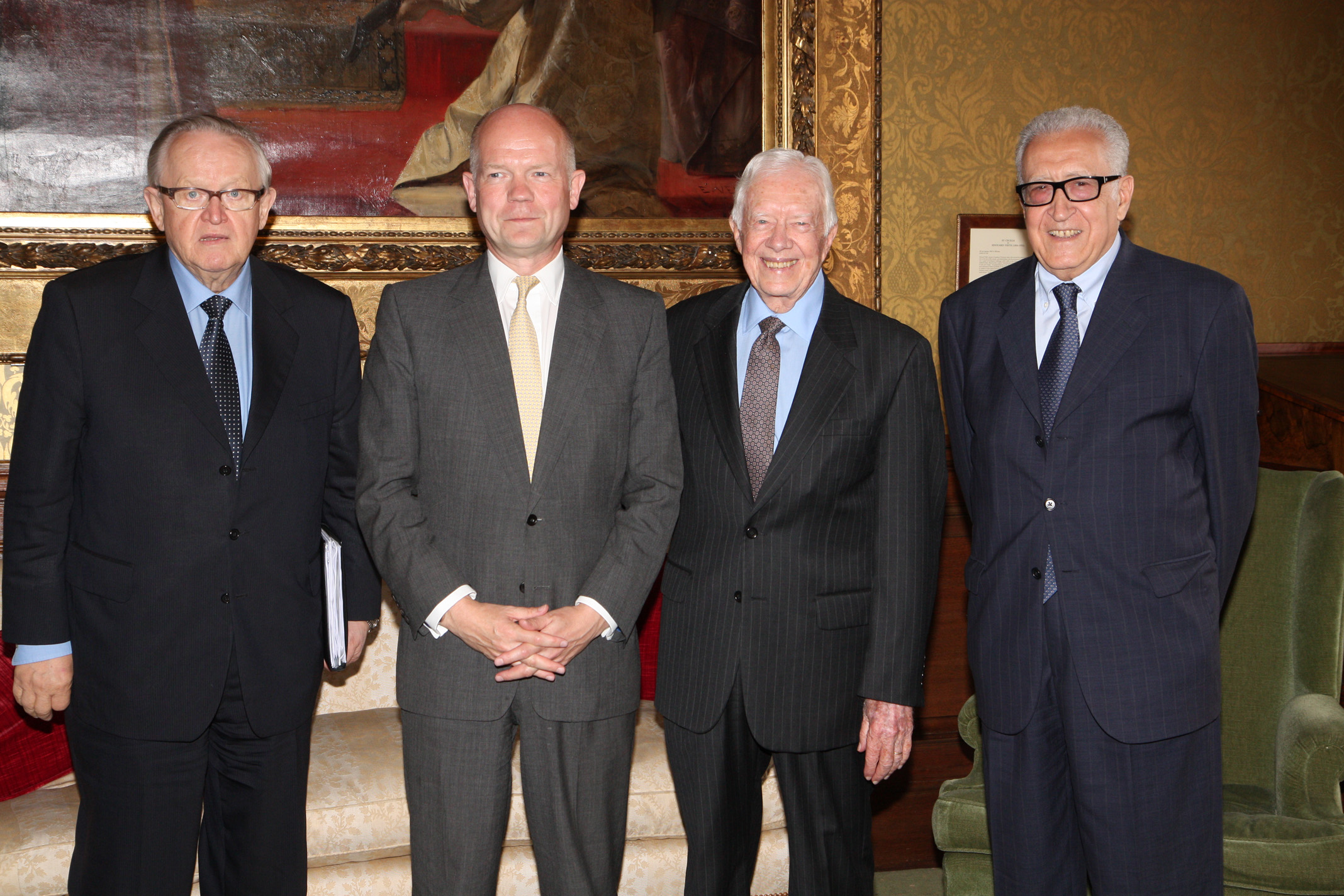
Ahtisaari (first from left) with William Hague, Jimmy Carter, and Lakhdar Brahimi from The Elders group in London, 24 July 2013

In August 2012, Ahtisaari opined on the sectarian violence in Syria and was mentioned as a possible replacement as Joint Envoy there to succeed former Secretary-General Kofi Annan. However, Ahtisaari then told the Finnish state broadcaster YLE that "he wished the mission would fall on someone else" which it ultimately did in the person of Lakhdar Brahimi, a former Algerian foreign minister and longtime U.N. diplomat.

In late 2015, Martti Ahtisaari reiterated charges he already had made in an interview with German broadcaster Deutsche Welle in early 2013 against members of the UN security council on the obstruction of a political solution to the escalating conflict in Syria. Ahtisaari said in an interview in September 2015 that he held talks about Syria with envoys from the five permanent members of the UN security council in February 2012. According to Ahtisaari, Vitaly Churkin, Russian ambassador to the United Nations, laid out three points during a meeting with him, which included not arming the Syrian opposition, commencing talks between Syrian president Assad and the opposition and finding "an elegant way for Assad to step aside". But the US, Britain and France subsequently ignored the proposal. Ahtisaari said in the interview: "Nothing happened because I think all these, and many others, were convinced that Assad would be thrown out of office in a few weeks so there was no need to do anything."

== Personal life, health and death ==
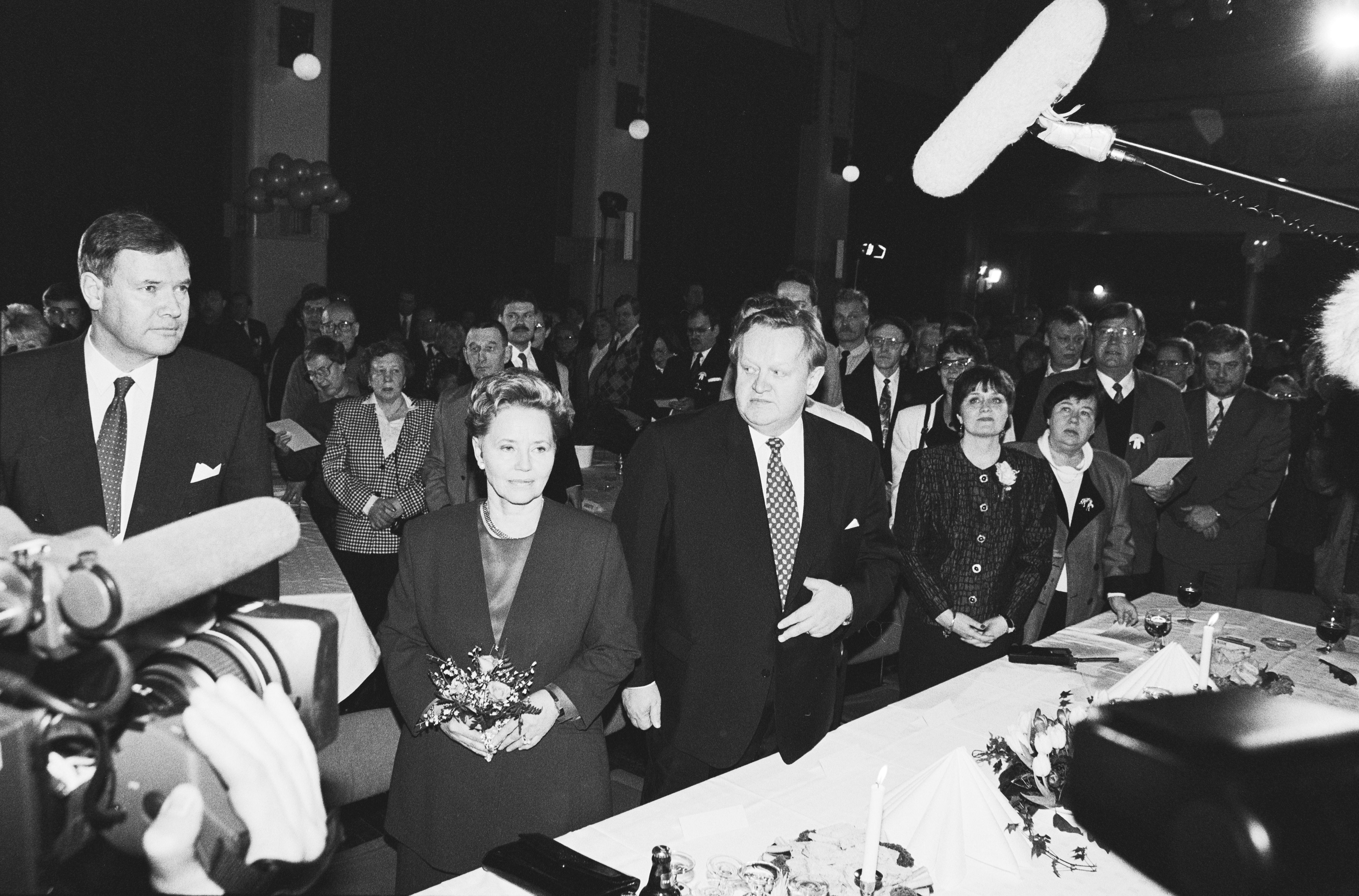
Ahtisaari with his wife Eeva Ahtisaari (second from left), 1994

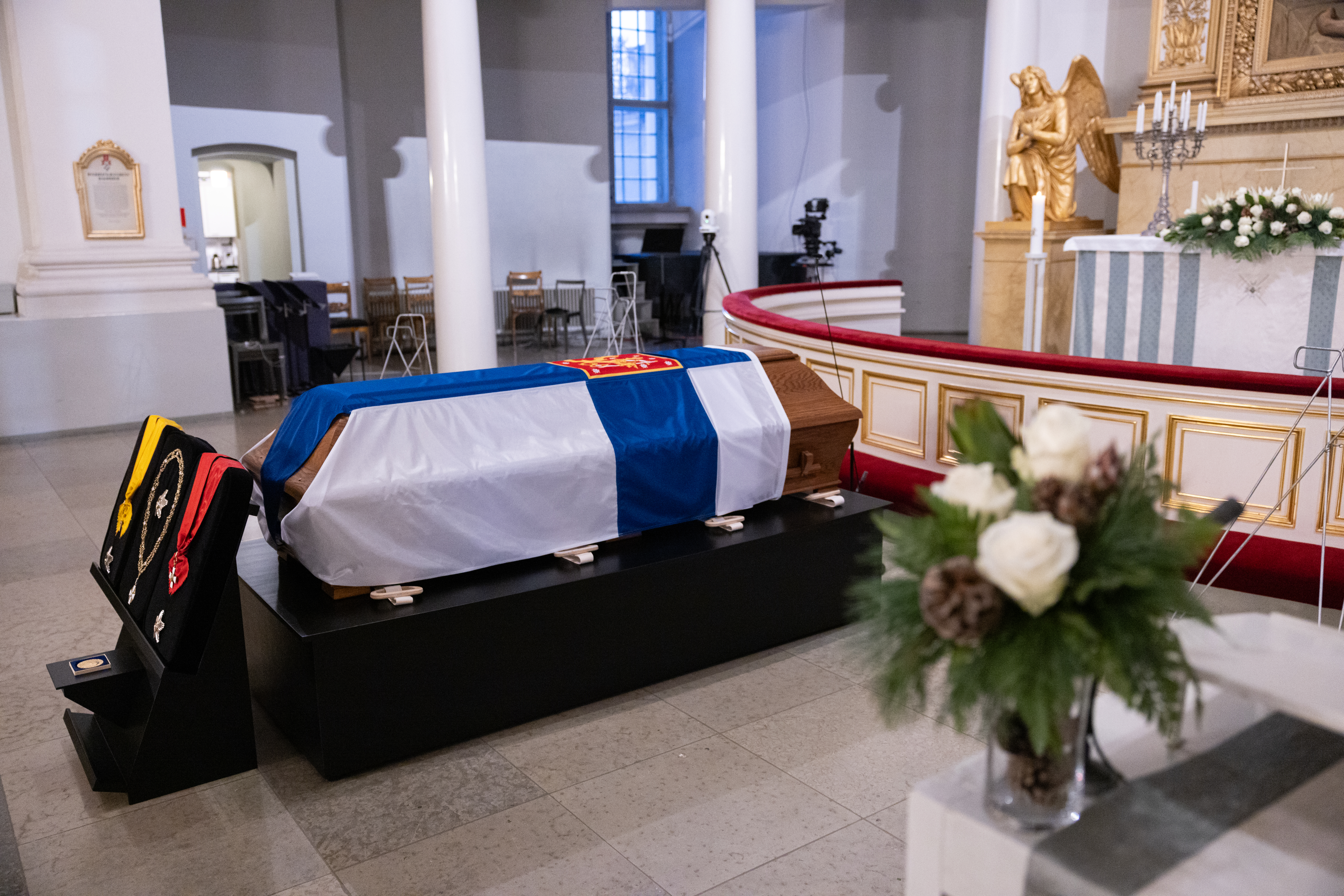
State funeral of Martti Ahtisaari

In 1968, he married Eeva Irmeli Hyvärinen, who was studying history at the University of Helsinki and whom he met as a child at the Lyceum in Kuopio. They had one son, Marko Ahtisaari, who was born in 1969.

On 24 March 2020, amid the large-scale outbreak of COVID-19, it was announced that Ahtisaari had tested positive for the disease. His spouse, Eeva Ahtisaari, was diagnosed with the same virus on 21 March. Eeva Ahtisaari had attended the International Women's Day concert on 8 March at the Helsinki Music Centre while infected. On 14 April 2020 it was announced that Martti and Eeva Ahtisaari were recovering from the coronavirus infection.

On 2 September 2021, it was announced that Ahtisaari had Alzheimer's disease and had retired from public life.

Ahtisaari died from complications of Alzheimer's disease in Helsinki, on 16 October 2023, at age 86. His state funeral was held on 10 November 2023 in Helsinki Cathedral at 1 p.m., after which he was buried at the Hietaniemi Cemetery in Helsinki.

== Honours ==
Coat of Arms of Martti Ahtisaari
- Armiger: Martti Ahtisaari
- Adopted: 1994
- Motto: Se pystyy ken uskaltaa ("The one who dares, can")

=== National honours ===
- Finland:
  - Grand Cross with Collar of the Order of the White Rose of Finland (1999)
  - Grand Cross of the Order of the Cross of Liberty
  - Grand Cross of the Order of the Lion of Finland
  - Saint Henry Cross
  - Grand Cross of the Order of the Holy Lamb

=== Foreign honours ===
- Albania:
  - National Flag Decoration (12 September 2016)
- Australia:
  - Honorary Officer of the Order of Australia (2002)
- Argentina:
  - Grand Cross with Collar of the Order of the Liberator General San Martín (3 March 1997)
- Belgium:
  - Grand Cordon of the Order of Leopold
- Brazil:
  - Grand Cross of the Order of the Southern Cross
- Chile:
  - Collar of the Order of Merit
- Denmark:
  - Knight of the Order of the Elephant (1994)
  - Knight of the Order of the Dannebrog
- Estonia:
  - Collar of the Order of the Cross of Terra Mariana
- France:
  - Grand Cross of the Order of Legion of Honour
- Germany:
  - Grand Cross Special Class of the Order of Merit of the Federal Republic of Germany
- Greece:
  - Grand Cross of the Order of the Redeemer
- Hungary:
  - Grand Cross of the Order of Merit of the Republic of Hungary
- Iceland:
  - Collar with Grand Cross of the Order of the Falcon (26 September 1995)
- Indonesia:
  - Third Class of the Star of the Republic of Indonesia
- Italy:
  - Knight Grand Cross with Collar of the Order of Merit of the Italian Republic (1997)
- Kuwait:
  - Grand Cordon of the Order of Mubarak the Great
- Latvia:
  - Commander Grand Cross of the Order of the Three Stars:
- Lithuania
  - Grand Cross of the Order of Vytautas the Great (1996)
- Malaysia:
  - Honorary Recipient of the Most Exalted Order of the Crown of the Realm (1995)
- Mexico:
  - Collar of the Order of the Aztec Eagle (1999)
- Netherlands:
  - Knight Grand Cross of the Order of the Netherlands Lion
- Norway:
  - Grand Cross with Collar of the Order of St. Olav (1994)
- Poland:
  - Knight of the Order of the White Eagle (1997)
- Romania:
  - Grand Cross of the Order of the Star of Romania
- South Africa:
  - Supreme Companion of the Order of the Companions of O. R. Tambo (16 June 2004)
  - Grand Cross of the Order of Good Hope (1997)
- Spain:
  - Knight of the Collar of the Order of Isabella the Catholic
- Sweden:
  - Knight with Collar (1996) of the Royal Order of the Seraphim (1994)
- Turkey:
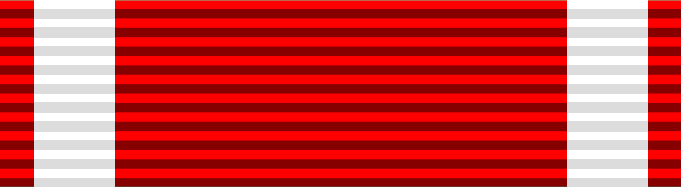
  - First Class of the Order of the State of the Republic of Turkey (1999)
- Ukraine:
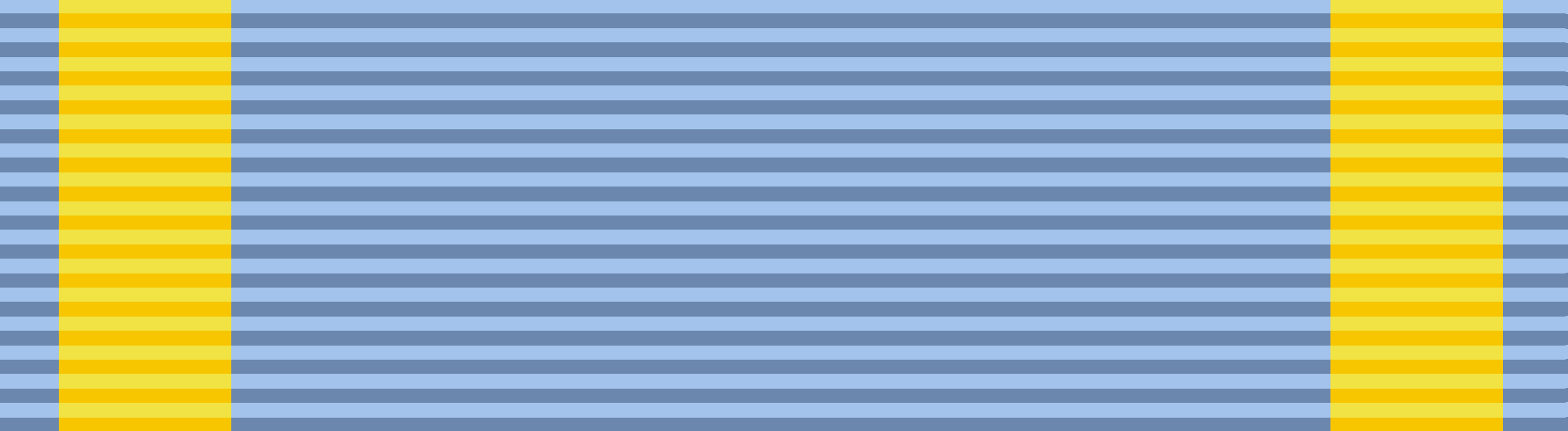
  - First Class of the Order of Yaroslav the Wise
- United Arab Emirates:
  - First Class of the Order of Federation
- United Kingdom:
  - Honorary Knight Grand Cross of the Order of the Bath (1995)

== Awards ==
- 1995: Zamenhof Prize for International Understanding, of the World Esperanto Association
- 1998: Honorary doctorate from Helsinki University of Technology, and from National University of Kyiv-Mohyla Academy
- 2000: J. William Fulbright Prize for International Understanding
- 2000: Freedom medal
- 2000: Germany: Hessian Peace Prize
- 2004: OR Tambo Award
- 2006: Gold Medal of The American-Scandinavian Foundation
- 2007: Germany: Manfred Wörner Medal of the German Ministry of Defense
- 2007: Honorary degree, University of St. Gallen, Switzerland
- 2008: Delta Prize for Global Understanding
- 2008: Félix Houphouët-Boigny Peace Prize
- 2008: Nobel Peace Prize
- 2008: Netherlands: Geuzenpenning
- 2011: Honorary degree, University of Calgary, Canada

== See also ==
- List of peace activists
- List of presidents of Finland

Political offices
Preceded by Mauno Koivisto	President of Finland; 1994–2000	Succeeded by Tarja Halonen
Awards and achievements
Preceded by Al Gore; Intergovernmental Panel on Climate Change	Laureate of the Nobel Peace Prize; 2008	Succeeded by Barack Obama
