= Sharism =

Social movement around sharing within a community

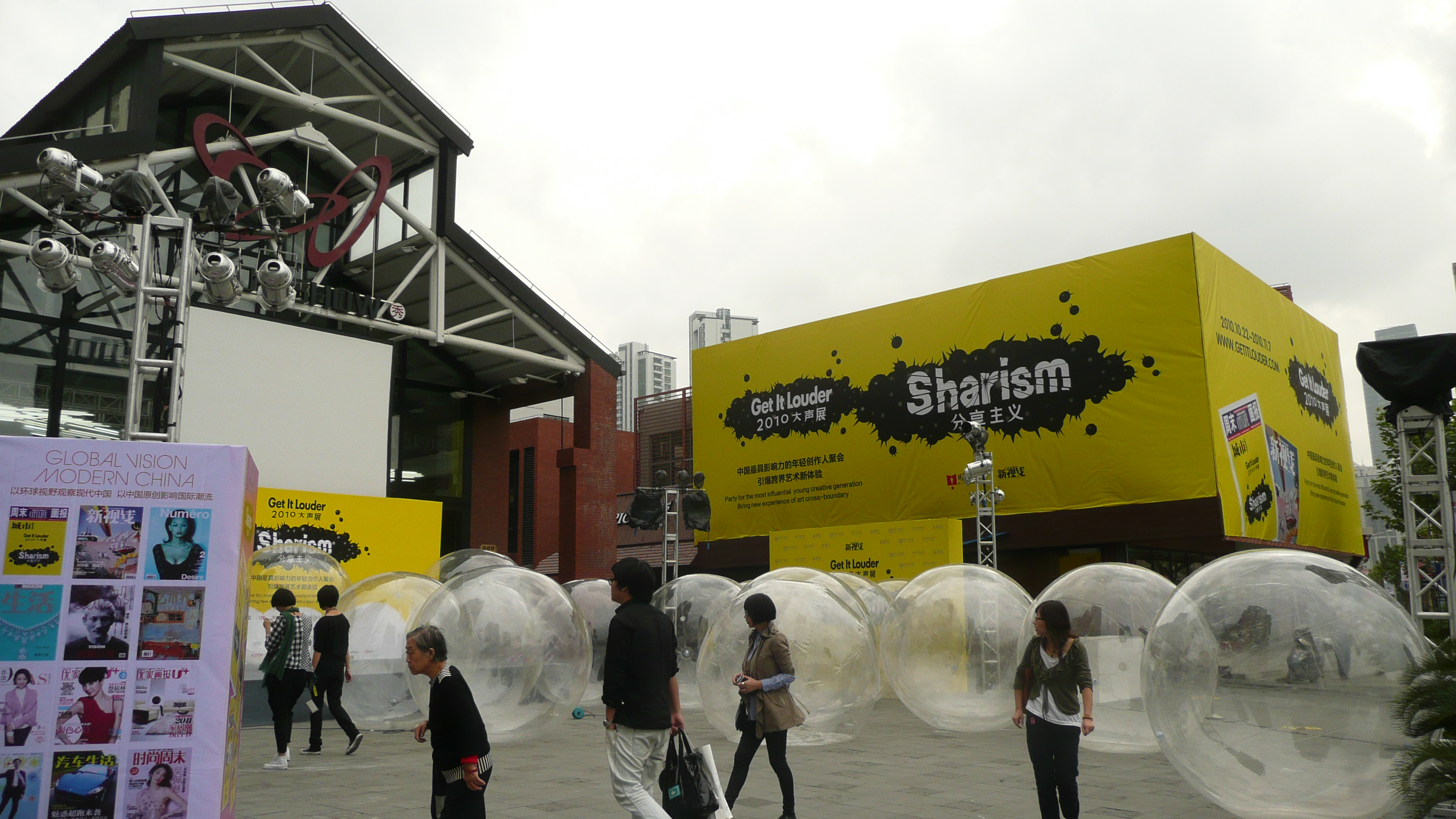
Get It Louder Sharism exhibition in Shanghai

Sharism is a philosophy on sharing content and ideas, developed by Isaac Mao. Inspired by user-generated content, sharism states that the act of sharing something within a community produces a proper value for each of its participants: "the more you share, the more you receive". As knowledge is produced through crowdsourcing, this new kind of shared ownership leads to the production of goods and services where value is distributed through the contributions of everyone involved.

== History ==
Sharism was coined by Isaac Mao in the essay "Sharism: A Mind Revolution" which was originally published in the book Freesouls. Mao draws a comparison between the open distribution model of online information sharing and the neurological networks of the human brain. Following the analogy of an emerging Social Brain, Mao argues that the process of empowering people through sharing leads to collective ways of rethinking social relationships.

Sharism has been particularly focused in China in order to promote the Open Web and combat Internet censorship. Notable proponents of sharism as both a term and practice have included Larry Lessig and Ou Ning. In 2010 during a Creative Commons lecture in Beijing, Lessig mentioned sharism in the context of openness and innovation in creative industries and intellectual property law in China. Also in 2010, Ou in his role as a curator choose sharism as the unifying theme for the Shanghai biennale exhibition "Get It Louder". In an interview about the exhibition, Ou discussed sharism at length and described it as an "Internet concept" that explores the increasingly convoluted relationship between public and private realms."

Sharism Lab was created in 2012 with the purpose of providing experimental and theoretical background for a real-world implementation of sharism.

== Events and by-products ==
Several types of sharism events have been created for people to meet and share things they like or things they make. Sharism Forum was held in October 2010 at the Get It Louder festival in Shanghai, and gathered international speakers, practitioners and activists to discuss the idea of sharism.

Another event called "Sharism Presents" offers an informal setup for people to share whatever they want with the attending audience. Since 2010, Sharism Presents have been hosted in many cities throughout the world, included: Amsterdam, Shanghai, Beijing, Madrid, Barcelona, Brussels, Berlin, Montreal, Singapore, Hong Kong, Tokyo and Seoul.

Sharism Workshops provide a framework for collective production through the act of sharing. Workshops have been held in Beijing, Doha and Warsaw and have included musicians, digital artists, and designers.

In order to offer an easy way to share any kind of work online, the Sharing Agreement has been created in order to work around the increasing complexity of licenses.

== Criticism ==
Many academics point to the downsides of such uncritical belief in the transformative power of technology. User generated content has been reframed as "Loser Generated Content", as the value of this sharing often ends up with companies, and not in the public domain. Within the art world, it has been suggested that there are "dangers of 'sharism", which "lead people to believe that whatever is contemporary must also be avantgarde."

== See also ==
- Sharing economy
- Creative Commons
- Free Software
- Knowledge sharing
- Commons-based peer production
- Copyleft
- Socialism
