= State funeral of Martti Ahtisaari =

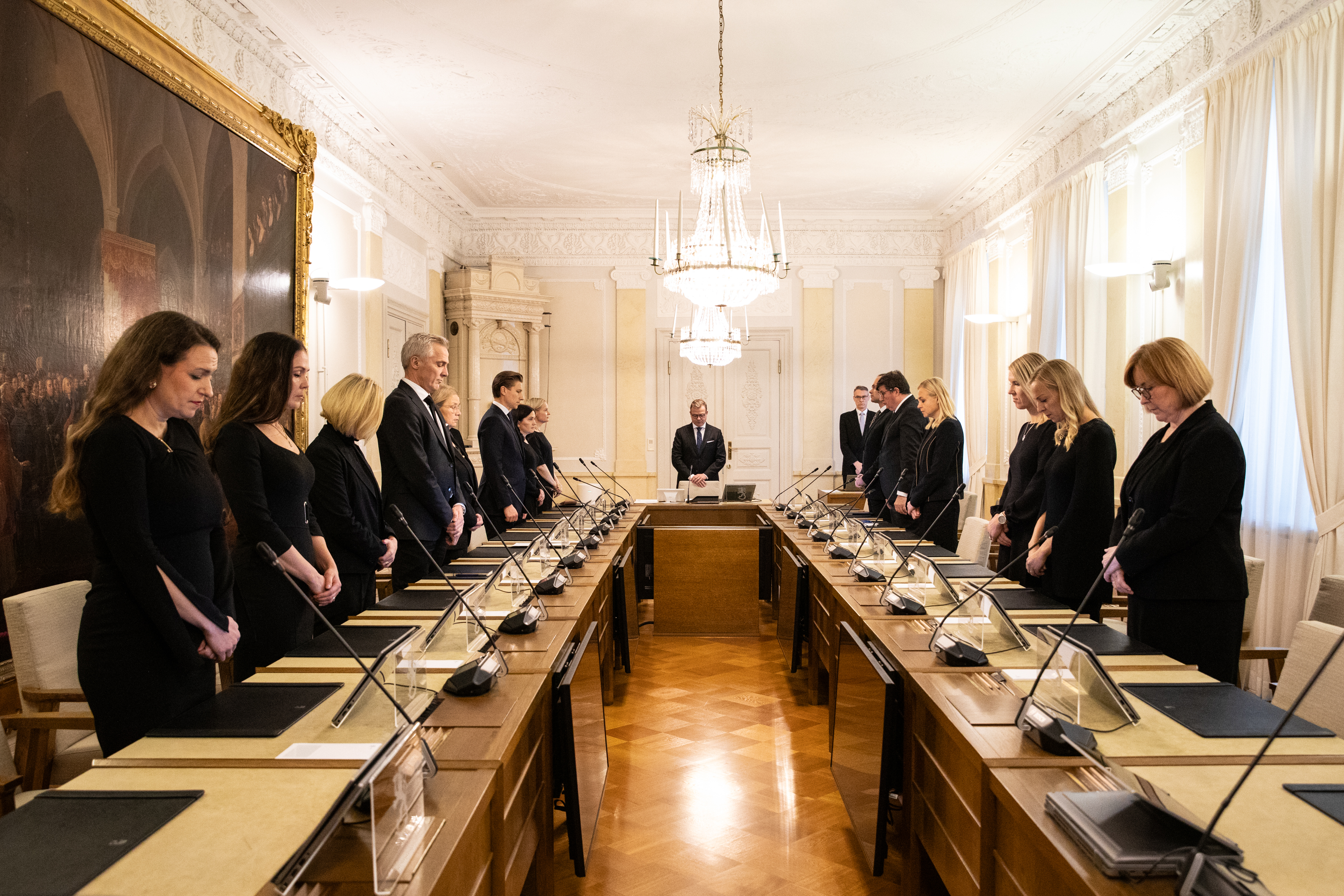
A moment of silence for the members of the Finnish Government in memory of President Ahtisaari on 18 October 2023.

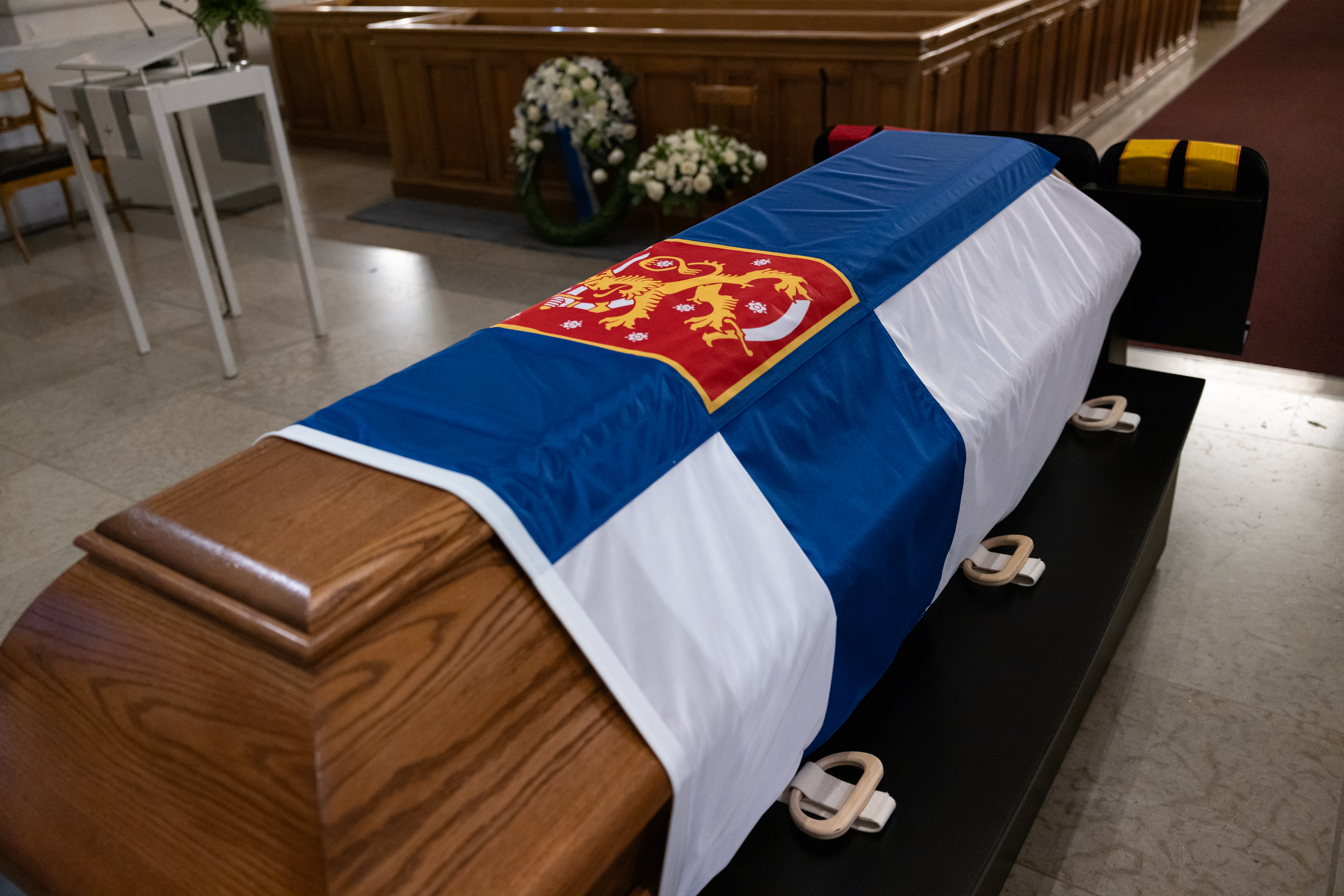
Ahtisaari's remains lie in the Helsinki Cathedral

Martti Ahtisaari, the president of Finland from 1994 to 2000, died on 16 October 2023. The state funeral of Ahtisaari was held on 10 November 2023, also known as St. Martin's Day (Martinpäivä). The funeral service was held in Helsinki Cathedral, where at least 800 guests were expected to attend the service, including 30 international guests, after which he was buried at the Hietaniemi Cemetery in Helsinki, in the same area where presidents Urho Kekkonen, Mauno Koivisto and Risto Ryti are buried.

Notable guests of the service included the president of Namibia Hage Geingob, the king of Sweden Carl XVI Gustaf, the 4th president of Tanzania Jakaya Kikwete, president of Kosovo Vjosa Osmani and 7th president of Ireland Mary Robinson attended the service.

== See also ==
- State funerals in Finland
