= Naser Manzuri =

Iranian novelist and linguist (born 1953)

Naser Manzuri (Azeri: Nasir Mənzuri; Persian: ناصر منظوری; born 1953 in Mianeh) is an Iranian novelist and linguist.

He writes his novels in the Azerbaijani language. He vastly concentrates on Azeri mythical thoughts in his themes and combines with reality. However, he writes his linguistic theoreticals in three languages (Azerbaijani, Persian, and English).

== Bibliography ==
=== Novels ===
- Son Nağıl Son Efsane (The Last Tale, the Last Myth) 1990
- Qaraçuxa (pronounced: Qarachookha, name of some mythical character, in fact, it is the personification of protection and luck for any one.) 1994
- Avava (call for gathering, done by tapping the hand at the mouth on the last moony nights of summer Sonay) 2005
- Oyunum-Oyunum (2023)

=== Scholarly work ===
In his linguistic researches he concentrates on deterministic concepts. His books (written in three languages) are:

- نظام چهاربعدی زبان (Four-dimensional System of Language), 2002
- Deterministically Structuring Concepts, 2003
- Dil ve Ayın Düşünce (Language and Mythical Thought), 2007
- آشوبی‌شدگی در شعر شهريار -1 (Oral Tablets-1) (Sheriyar’s [Azeri poet] Poetry going Chaotic, 1), 2009
- آشوبی‌شدگی در شعر شهريار -2 (Oral Tablets-2) (Sheriyar’s [Azeri poet] Poetry going Chaotic, 2), 2009
- زايش ادبيات (Oral Tablets-4) (Birth of Literature), 2011
- مفهوم صدا (Oral Tablets-5) (Concepts with the Sounds), 2011
- ساختار مفهومی فعل (Oral Tablets-6) (Conceptual Structuring of Verbs), 2012
- نظام فراجمله‌ای در زبان ترکی (Oral Tablets-7) (Ultra-sentential System in Turkish Language), 2012
- ٤ باى، ٤ فصل (Oral Tablets 8) (4 BAYs, 4 Seasons), 2014
- اساطیر یونانی در سیاه‌چاله زبان-فکر (Oral Tablets 9) (Greek Myths in the Black Hole of Language-thought), 2015
- مفهوم "مؤنث" در زبان-فکر (Oral Tablets 10) ("Femininity" as Conceptualized in Language-thought), 2015
- آذ (Oral Tablets 11) (Az), 2017
- Fellik (Oral Tablet 12, 13), 2023
- Aşıq (Oral Tablets 14), 2025
