= State funeral =

Ceremony for nationally significant people

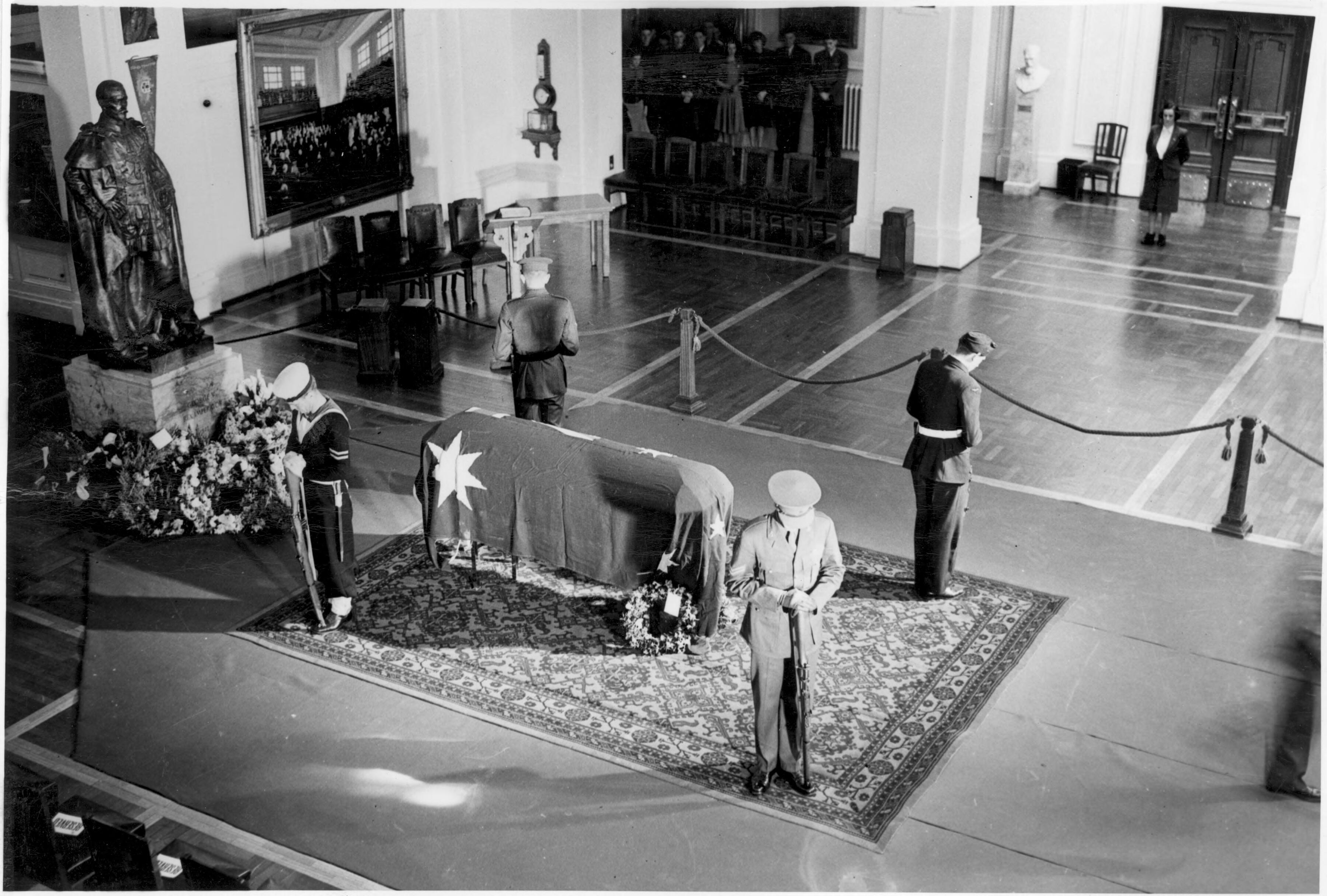
The coffin of John Curtin, Prime Minister of Australia, lying in state inside King's Hall, Old Parliament House, Canberra, on July 6, 1945 after dying in office

A state funeral is a public funeral ceremony, observing the strict rules of protocol, held to honour people of national significance. State funerals often include much pomp and ceremony as well as religious overtones and distinctive elements of military tradition. A state funeral will often receive coverage in national and global media outlets.

== History ==
State funerals existed in antiquity. In ancient Athens, for example, fallen soldiers were regularly buried in a public ceremony. In the Roman Empire, a state funeral (funera publica) could be instructed by the senate for the city of Rome, whereas city councils could instruct a communal state funeral.

== By country ==
=== Australia ===
Surveyor General Lieutenant Colonel William Light (1786–1839) received Australia's first state funeral on October 10, 1839, in Adelaide. Government offices were closed for the day of the funeral, the State's Governor and officials joined the funeral procession, and thousands attended.

The second state funeral in Australia was in Melbourne on January 21, 1863, for explorers Robert O'Hara Burke and William John Wills.

=== Bangladesh ===
12 people have received state funerals in Bangladesh. The first was national poet Kazi Nazrul Islam in 1976, and the most recent the former first Lady and prime minister, Begum Khaleda Zia in 2025.

=== Canada ===
State funerals in Canada are public events held to commemorate former governors general, prime ministers, other members of the cabinet who died in office, and, at the cabinet's discretion, other eminent Canadians. With ceremonial, military, and religious elements incorporated, state funerals are offered and executed by the governor general-in-council, who provides a dignified manner for the Canadian people to mourn a national public figure. Provincial and territorial governments may also perform state funerals for citizens in their particular jurisdictions. However, most state funerals are federal affairs.

As Canada shares the person of its monarch with the other Commonwealth realms, funerals for Canada's sovereigns, as well as for their consorts, typically take place in the monarch's oldest and most populous realm, the United Kingdom. In Canada, a commemoration service is conducted by the federal crown-in-council and sometimes by provincial crowns, as well.

=== Finland ===
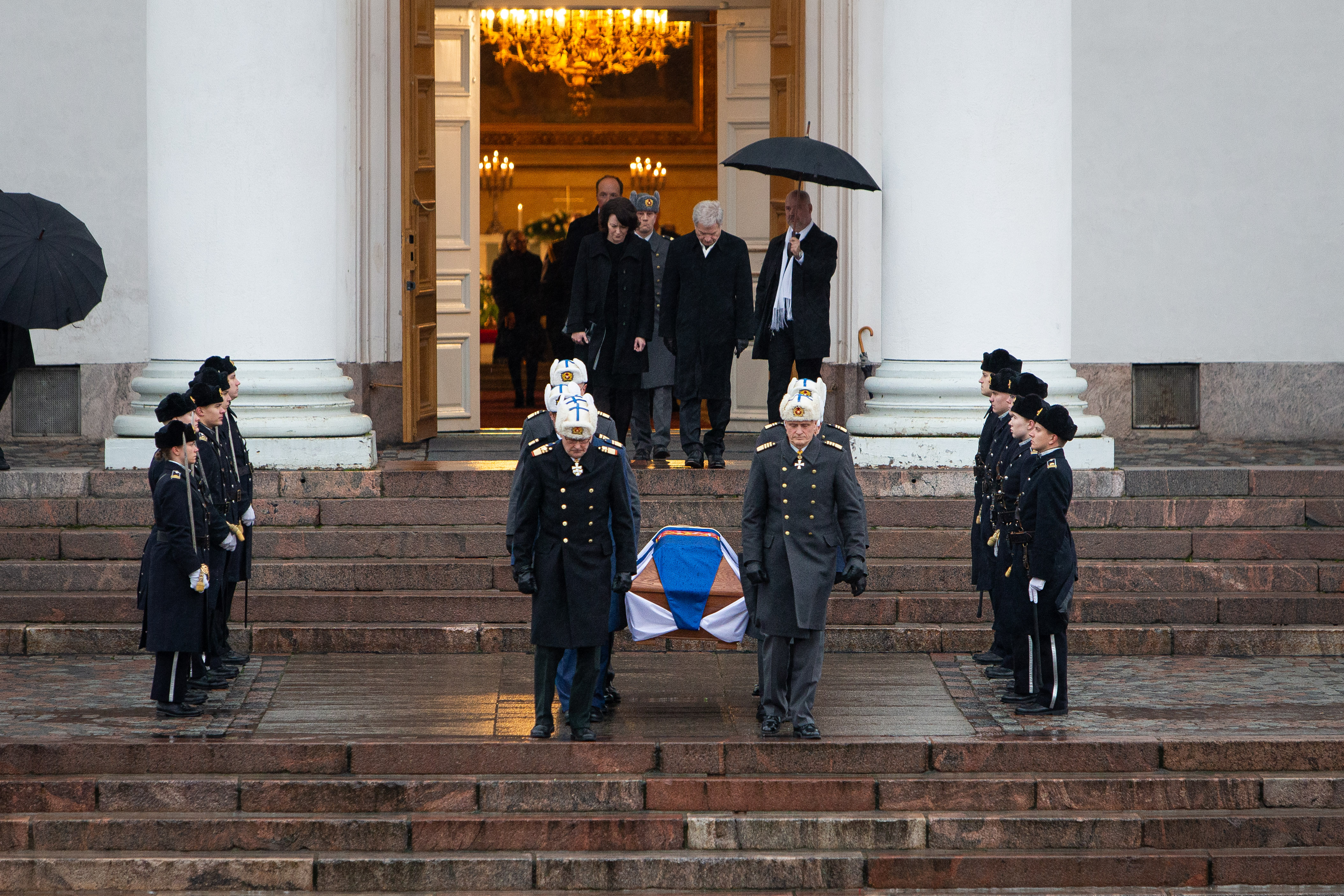
A state funeral of President Martti Ahtisaari on 10 November 2023

In Finland, state funerals continue only for Finnish presidents. In exceptional cases, the Finnish Government may grant or finance a funeral for a very long-serving prime minister, speaker of the parliament, and persons of special national importance. This practice has been in force in Finland since 1989.

=== India ===
In the 21st century, figures including the cartoonist Bal Thackeray, the businessman Ratan Tata, and the former prime minister Manmohan Singh have received state funerals.

=== Italy ===
In Italy, state funerals are granted by law to the current and former presidents of the constitutional entities, such as the Presidency, Parliament, the Government, and the Constitutional Court, as well as to ministers who die while in office. State funerals can also be granted by decree of the Council of Ministers to individuals who provided exceptional service to the country, citizens who brought honor to the nation, or those who died in the line of duty or as victims of terrorism or organized crime.

The official protocol provides for:

- the coffin surrounded by six members in high uniform of either the Carabinieri or the same Armed Forces the departed belonged to
- an honor guard to the coffin at the entrance and the exit of the place in which the ceremony is held
- the presence of one representative of the Government
- an official commemorative oration
- other honors that can be arranged by the prime minister

Public mourning, either national or local, is declared following the provisions of the prime minister's decrees. The flags are flown at half-mast outside public buildings, while inside they display two black ribbons, with the exceptions provided for military flags when required by military protocol.

If the deceased held a public office, the body can lie in state in the building of the office's institution. In other cases, the will of the family, the traditions of the office, or the local customs are followed.

Outside the cases provided for by protocol, for example during natural events that deeply impact the community, solemn funerals can be arranged and the six people who carry the coffins are members of the Civil Protection.

=== Thailand ===
Thai royal funerals (Thai: พระราชพิธีพระบรมศพ; RTGS: Phra Ratcha Phithi Phra Borommasop) are elaborate events, organised as royal ceremonies akin to state funerals. They are held for deceased members of the royal family, and consist of numerous rituals which typically span several months to over a year. Featuring a mixture of Buddhist and animist beliefs, as well as Hindu symbolism, these rituals include the initial rites that take place after death, a lengthy period of lying-in-state, during which Buddhist ceremonies take place, and a final cremation ceremony. For the highest-ranking royalty, the cremation ceremonies are grand public spectacles, featuring the pageantry of large funeral processions and ornate purpose-built funeral pyres or temporary crematoria known as merumat or men. The practices date to at least the 17th century, during the time of the Ayutthaya Kingdom. Today, the cremation ceremonies are held in the royal field of Sanam Luang in the historic centre of Bangkok.

=== United Kingdom ===
In the United Kingdom, state funerals are usually reserved for monarchs. The most recent was the state funeral of Queen Elizabeth II on 19 September 2022.

A state funeral may also be held to honour a highly distinguished figure following the approval of the monarch and Parliament (of the expenditure of public funds). The last non-royal state funeral in the United Kingdom was that of Sir Winston Churchill on 30 January 1965.

Other funerals, including those of senior members of the British royal family and high-ranking public figures, may share many of the characteristics of a state funeral without being categorised as such; for these, the term "ceremonial funeral" is used. In the past fifty years, ceremonial funerals have been held for Louis Mountbatten, 1st Earl Mountbatten of Burma (1979); Diana, Princess of Wales (1997); Queen Elizabeth the Queen Mother (2002); Margaret Thatcher, Baroness Thatcher (2013); and Prince Philip, Duke of Edinburgh (2021). Ceremonial funerals have tended in general to follow the ritual patterns of a state funeral (if on a somewhat smaller scale).

An exception was the funeral of the Duke of Windsor (former King Edward VIII), in 1972. Although the exiled Duke opted for a private family event instead of a full state funeral, it had one distinctive feature of a sovereign's funeral: traditional recitation of Edward's titles as monarch by the Garter King of Arms.

A gun carriage has been used to transport the coffin between locations since Queen Victoria's funeral (1901); it is also accompanied by a procession of military bands and detachments along with mourners and other officials. There may also be a lying in state and other associated ceremonies.

=== United States ===
In the United States, state funerals are the official funeral rites conducted by the federal government in the nation's capital, Washington, D.C., that are offered to a sitting or former president, a president-elect, high government officials and other civilians who have rendered distinguished service to the nation. Administered by the Military District of Washington (MDW), a command unit of the Joint Force Headquarters National Capital Region, state funerals are greatly influenced by protocol, steeped in tradition, and rich in history. However, the overall planning as well as the decision to hold a state funeral, is largely determined by the family of the honoree, upon invitation by the government.

== See also ==
- List of people who have received a state funeral
- Funeral train
- Limbers and caissons
- Lincoln Catafalque
- Lying in repose
- Lying in state
- Military funeral
- Missing man formation
- Riderless horse
- State funerals in Canada
- State funerals in the United States
- Vigil of the Princes
- State Funeral (2019 film)
