= Xiha Life =

Multilingual social networking website

Xiha Life was a multilingual social networking website. It integrates Google's automatic translation software, Google Translate, which enables users to instantly translate comments and posts within the site itself. The user interface has been translated into 42 languages, and the system supports communication in 56 languages. Xiha Life has 750,000 members worldwide, with no single country comprising more than 5% of its membership.

== History ==
Xiha Life was founded on September 28, 2007, by Jani Penttinen, who serves as its CEO. The name, "Xiha", is Mandarin for "happy" or "joyful". In 2009, Xiha was named one of the Red Herring 100 Europe, an award given to promising European tech companies.

== Board of Members ==
Its board includes Jaiku co-founder and former Google Project Manager Jyri Engeström, Jan Achenius and Ville Miettinen. Xiha Life is operated out of Sunnyvale, California, Switzerland, and Finland.
