= Sonay =

In Azerbaijan folklore the last moony nights of summer is called Sonay (so-na-y, سونای). In Azerbaijani mythical thought the sun and the moon are eternally in love. They will never get to each other.

Sonay occurs at autumnal equinox when the day and night are equal so when the full moon of Sonay rises the sun is to set. That is the time that these eternal lovers could see each other face to face, of course, for just a few minutes. That night the Sonay's look is full of love.

The well-known love story of Asli and Kərəm is, in fact, the repetition of Sonay love in reality. Similarly, these two lovers seek for each other. They could see each other for a little while and they lose each other. Then, finally, after so much ordeals or agony when they marry, the wedding night reaching to each other they are burned in fire (as if sun burns)

In the Sonay nights, they make the sound of AVAVA by tapping hands at their mouths, as a call for gathering. Then they gather and play late the moonlight nights. Of the necessarily played games/plays are: Mallaharay and Bənövşə Bəndə Düşə.

It was after Sonay that they used to go for love offerings, engagements and weddings up to Novruz Bayrami (the celebration of new year and starting of spring).

Sonay is equal to a harvest moon in western culture.

Sonay was played as a concert at the Concert Hall of Azadi Tower, Tehran, Iran on February 20, 2024.

== Other sources ==
- Dilmac Journal (34) special issue (2007), Tehran
- Avava, Naser Manzuri, 2005
- Qaraçuxa, Naser Manzuri, 1994
- Scrutiny over Naser Manzuri's AVAVA Novel, Masters Thesis, ('Nasır Menzuri’nin AVAVA ROMANI ÜZERİNE BİR İNCELEME'), Sedef Ahenpençe, yüksek lisans tezi, CELAL BAYAR ÜNİ. SOSYAL BİLİMLER ENS. YENİ TÜRK EDEBİYATI ANABİLİM DALI, 2010
