= Umbra (3D technology company) =

Graphics software technology company

- Type: Subsidiary
- Industry: Video games
- Founded: 2007; 19 years ago in Helsinki, Finland
- Headquarters: Helsinki
- Parent: Amazon
- Website: umbra3d.com

Umbra is a graphics software technology company founded 2007 in Helsinki, Finland. Umbra specializes in occlusion culling, visibility solution technology and provides middleware for video games running on Windows, Linux, iOS, PlayStation 4, Xbox One, PlayStation 3, Xbox 360, Wii U, handheld consoles, and other platforms. In 2021, Amazon acquired Umbra.

Umbra provides the occlusion culling system for the Unity game engine since the Unity 3 release.

Umbra is also available as a plug-in for Unreal Engine 3 and Unreal Engine 4.

Umbra's technology is used in many major video games such as Batman: Arkham Knight, Call of Duty: Ghosts, The Witcher 3: Wild Hunt, Destiny, Until Dawn, Killzone: Shadow Fall, Mass Effect 2, Mass Effect 3, Guild Wars 2, RaiderZ, The Secret World, Lord of the Rings Online, Planetside 2, Alan Wake, Age of Conan: Hyborian Adventures, Grandia Online, EVE Online, Free Realms, Dragon Age Origins, Dragon Age II, Deus Ex: Mankind Divided, and DOOM.

Umbra's technology has been licensed for use in video games by Rocksteady, Bungie, Guerrilla Games, CD Projekt, Microsoft Studios, Team Dakota, Neversoft, Infinity Ward, Shanda, Vicarious Visions, Specular Interactive, Remedy, Red Duck Inc., Splash Damage, Softmax and several others.

== History ==
Umbra was spun off from Hybrid Graphics in 2005. Umbra acquired Hybrid Graphics' dPVS and continued its development. The next generation of this technology, named Umbra, was a hardware accelerated occlusion culling middleware. Umbra was released in September 2007. In 2009, Umbra Occlusion Booster was released, and it was optimized for multi-core systems such as Xbox 360, PlayStation 3 and PC.

In 2011 Umbra mostly concentrated on developing Umbra 3. The solution offers performance optimization by optimizing critical parts of a game such as rendering and by providing tools to help with content streaming and game logic. Umbra 3 builds an internal representation of a game scene and uses this data at runtime to perform efficient queries that can be used to e.g. determine the set of visible objects for the player or determine the set of objects that are within a given distance from a point. The difference from past versions is that Umbra 3 has a pre-process stage where it compiles the visibility data which is then used at runtime to perform visibility-related queries. A new feature in 2012 is the streaming functionality allowing building of visibility data at runtime.

In March 2010, Unity Technologies announced that the next release of Unity would feature built-in occlusion culling preprocessing powered by Umbra. It first appeared in Unity 3. Prior to Unity 5's release Umbra's occlusion culling solution was available only with paid Pro licenses.

Edge Magazine's website next-generation.biz reported on 15 December 2011 that Umbra's technology is an integral part of Bungie's new 3D engine and game.

ArenaNet's Guild Wars 2 was released on 28 August and the game uses Umbra 3.

On 14 August 2012, Umbra announced its partnership with Nintendo which allows the licensing of the Umbra 3 middleware for Wii U developers.

At the Game Developers Conference 2014 Umbra announced Umbra for Cloud and Umbra VR. The latter is based on Umbra's Stereo Camera feature which the company explains allows that "both eyes can use the results of a single occlusion culling operation – effectively halving the required processing time."

On 3 April 2014, Umbra announced that its latest technology was licensed by Wargaming to be used as part of the graphical upgrade being made to World of Tanks. The deal also allows other Wargaming studios to use Umbra's Visibility Technology.

In January 2021, Amazon announced its acquisition of Umbra.

== Products ==
Umbra has developed two products: Umbra Occlusion Booster and Umbra 3.

Umbra Occlusion Booster is GPU accelerated occlusion culling middleware for PC, Xbox 360 and PlayStation 3. This product was released in 2009.

Umbra 3.2 was released on 1 February 2013. The "next-generation" update has several important new features such as streaming which enables streaming open worlds, shadow and light culling as well as hierarchical occluder data which also helps open world performance.

Umbra 3.3 was released on 11 August 2013.

In February 2015, Umbra announced Umbra Cloud and rebranded both the product and the company as simply Umbra.

=== dPVS ===
dPVS is an advanced computer graphics visibility optimization tool. Designed for developing games with large and dynamic [3D] worlds, dPVS computes visibility databases in real time. dPVS also reduces the time required for static PVS computation.

Originally started at Hybrid Graphics, under the name SurRender Umbra, it was the topic of Timo Aila's Master's Thesis, with the collaboration of Ville Miettinen (who was one of the developers of their SurRender engine.) Because of its continuing development, and also to help distinguish that it was not dependent on the SurRender engine, it was renamed dPVS. The technology was eventually spun off into its own company, Umbra Software Ltd.
