= Isaac Mao =

Chinese businessman

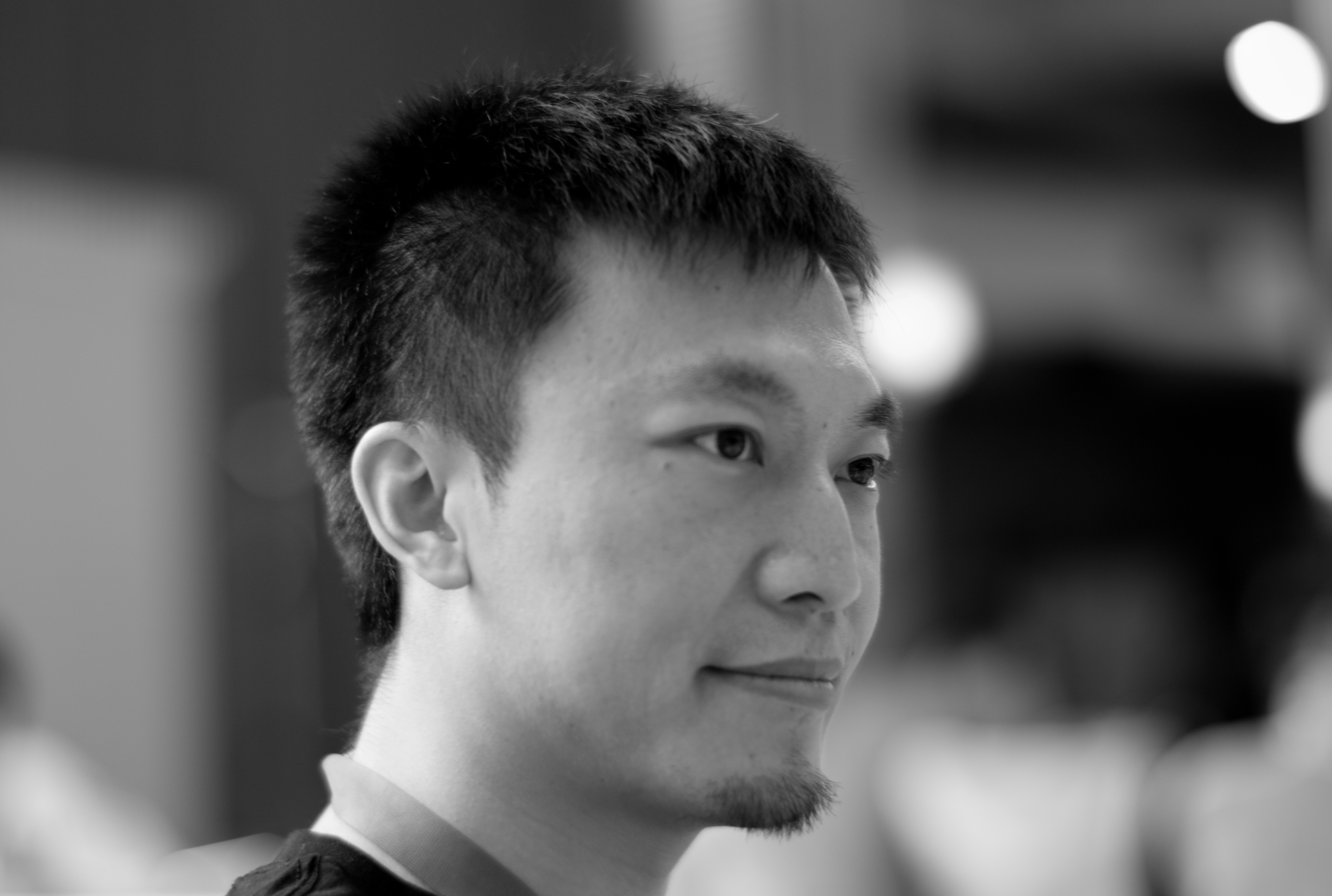
- Born: 毛向輝
- Education: Shanghai Jiao Tong University; Berkman Center for Internet and Society
- Known for: Software, Sharism
- Website: isaacmao.com

Isaac Mao (simplified Chinese: 毛向辉; traditional Chinese: 毛向輝; pinyin: Máo Xiànghuī) is a Chinese software architect, and social media researcher. He is doing research in social learning and for developing the philosophy of Sharism.

== Life and work ==
Mao is a blogger, software architect, researcher in learning and social technology. Mao has written about on-line journalism. Mao's essay "Sharism: A Mind Revolution" appeared in the Freesouls book project.

=== Blogging and blog advocacy ===
Mao has visited some conferences (such as Wikimania about Internet culture, in China and more broadly and other global events on Internet culture. In 2009, he was a speaker at the 40th anniversary of The Internet Conference held at UCLA As a trained software engineer, he has a long history of developing both business and consumer software. He worked as a Chief Architect in the Intel HomeCD project and Tangram BackSchool suite.

As of 2008, Mao published an open letter to Google, challenging the search engine giant to support anti-censorship efforts and change its strategy on China.
