= Dopplr =

- Website type: Social network service
- Available in: English
- Commercial: Yes
- Launched: 2007
- Current status: offline

Dopplr was a free social networking service, launched in 2007, that allowed users to create itineraries of their travel plans and spot correlations with their contacts' travel plans in order to arrange meetings at any point on their journey. Additional features included allowing the user to calculate the carbon footprint their journeys have produced. The site was named after Christian Doppler, discoverer of the Doppler effect. The company was based in the "Silicon Roundabout" area of London.

== Notable staff ==
- Marko Ahtisaari: CEO and co-founder
- Matt Biddulph: CTO and co-founder
- Matt Jones: CDO and co-founder
- Dan Gillmor: Founding Traveller
- Lisa Sounio: Chairman of the Board

== Investors ==
First-round angel investors in the site included Martin Varsavsky, Joichi Ito, Reid Hoffman, Saul Klein and Marko Ahtisaari. Second-round investors in fall 2008 were: Tom Glocer, Esther Dyson, Tyler Brûlé, Joshua Schachter, Yat Siu and Brian Behlendorf.

== Reception ==
A survey carried out in early 2008 on influential technology figures by the Guardian Media Group named Dopplr as a company to watch out for. The Evening Standard named Matt Biddulph and Matt Jones, two of the site's founders, among the thousand most influential people in London in 2007 and again in 2008.

== Shutdown ==
On 28 September 2009, Dopplr announced that they had been acquired by Nokia. Within a year questions were being raised as to the future of the site, with commentators noting that Dopplr's blog had not been updated since two days after the acquisition and its number of unique monthly users had dropped from 39,000 to 29,000. In a statement issued in September 2010 a Nokia spokesperson reported "we have decided to bring it into a maintenance mode ... but will not develop it further at this stage."

In October 2013, the front page was updated with an announcement that the service would close on 1 November 2013, which it subsequently did.
