= Marko Ahtisaari =

Finnish technology entrepreneur and musician

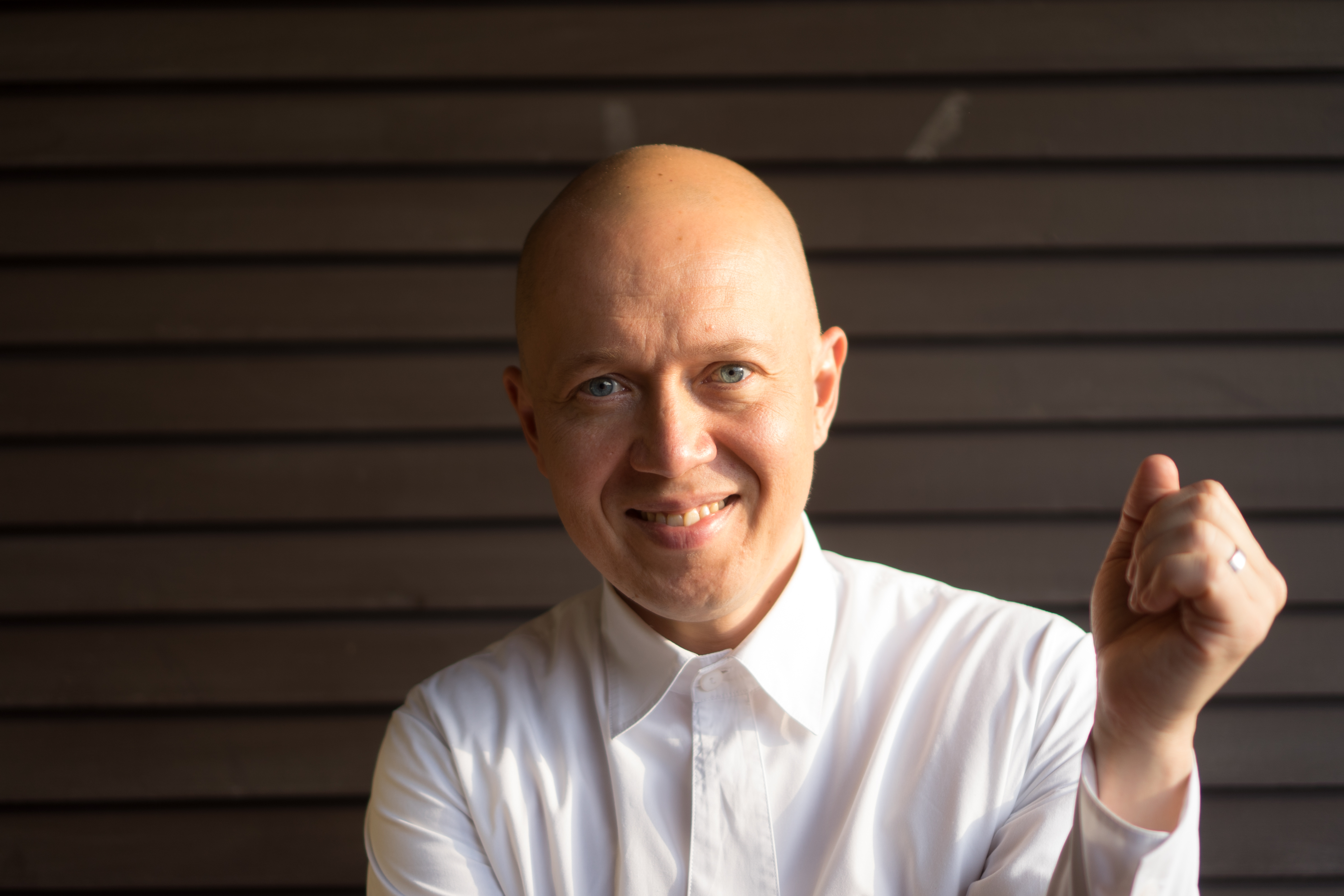
Marko Ahtisaari by Joi Ito in 2013

Marko Ahtisaari (born 6 February 1969 in Helsinki, Finland) is a Finnish technology entrepreneur and musician. Ahtisaari has been CEO and co-founder of two technology companies: Dopplr (acquired by Nokia in 2009) and Sync Project (acquired by Bose in 2018). After the acquisition of Dopplr, Ahtisaari was executive vice president of Design at Nokia and later a Director's Fellow at the MIT Media Lab. He is a composer, bassist and singer in the band Construction.

== Early life ==
Marko Ahtisaari is the son of Martti Ahtisaari, a former UN diplomat and President of Finland, and Eeva Ahtisaari, the former First Lady of Finland. He attended Columbia University, where he studied philosophy, economics and music.

== Work ==
Ahtisaari's business career started at a new media company Satama Interactive in 1998. In 2002 Ahtisaari left the company to join its biggest client, Nokia. He was appointed Director of Design strategy in 2005. In 2006, he left Nokia and joined his former boss, Nokia CEO Pekka Ala-Pietilä to start an advertisement-supported mobile network Blyk. In 2007, Ahtisaari became the founding investor and CEO of online business travel startup Dopplr, which was acquired by Nokia in 2009. Between February 2009 September 2013 Ahtisaari was Head of Product Design at Nokia. In January 2012, he was appointed as a member of the Nokia leadership team. Ahtisaari announced his resignation from Nokia when Microsoft acquired Nokia's devices business in September 2013.

Ahtisaari is co-editor with Laura Houseley of Out of the Blue: The Essence and Ambition of Finnish Design (Gestalten 2014) a survey of Finnish Design. Ahtisaari and Finnish entrepreneur and journalist Jaakko Tapaninen co-authored the book 10x Finland (Teos 2015) for the Finnish-speaking audience on the impact of digitalisation on a country like Finland. The book is based on original interviews with international persons of interest in technology and media including Joi Ito, Stefana Broadbent, Tyler Brule, danah boyd, Joshua Cooper Ramo, and Bret Easton Ellis. In its review the Finnish National daily Helsingin Sanomat called 10x Finland "one of the most interesting books written in Finnish on the effects of digitalisation." Ahtisaari contributed the essay "Intelligent Travel" to the Freesouls project.

In documents released by the United States Department of Justice in 2026 related to Jeffrey Epstein, Ahtisaari's name appears in an email exchange from 2013 in which a third party suggested an introduction between Epstein and Ahtisaari. Ahtisaari has stated that any meeting was brief and did not lead to further contact or cooperation, and he has denied any involvement in Epstein's activities.

== Music ==
Ahtisaari's band Skizm - together with percussionist Mauro Refosco, trumpetist Michael Leonhart, bassist Dan Cooper, singer Carolyn Kelley, and drummer Tobias Gebb - received a NARAS Grammy Showcase Award for new artists.
