= Blyk =

Advertising-funded mobile phone network

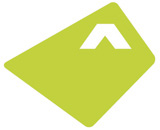
- Type: Private
- Industry: Telecommunications
- Founded: Helsinki, Finland
- Headquarters: Helsinki, Finland
- Area served: UK, the Netherlands
- Key people: Pekka Ala-Pietilä, Antti Öhrling

Blyk /ˈblɪk/ was an ad-supported mobile phone network that offered text messages and customer-to-customer calls, with a capped amount of usage being free of charge. It targeted young people and had offices in Finland, the Netherlands, the United Kingdom and in India.

It was the first mobile network funded by advertising, and was targeted at 16 to 24-year-olds. Users signing up to the network received advertising messages on their mobiles, and in return were given a monthly allowance of free top-up. Blyk was first launched in the United Kingdom, and closed operations there in 2009, becoming instead a partner to other established network operators.

== History ==
Blyk was founded by two Finns, Pekka Ala-Pietilä (formerly president of Nokia), and Antti Öhrling (ex-chairman and founder of the Contra advertising group). Its headquarters were in Helsinki but it also had an office in London. In February 2007 they appointed Jonathan MacDonald from the Ministry of Sound as UK Sales Director. In October 2007 Shaun Gregory was appointed UK CEO; he resigned on 9 January 2009 for personal reasons. Following Gregory's resignation, Antti Ohrling took over as UK CEO.

Before February 2009, the network offered 43 free minutes and 217 free texts to be used each month. Balances were reset after 30 days, so unused credit did not roll over. If the balance was used up before the monthly reset, users could pay 15p/min and 10p/text; thus, the free credit was worth £28.15.

In February 2009, the rates were changed to 24p/min and 8p/text. At this level, the free balance would have been worth £27.68/month. However, the system was also altered so that users' balances now reset to £15.00 every month. This can be spent on any combination of calls, texts, picture messages and data. Some people think this was because the company was making cutbacks due to the recession.

In July 2009, Blyk announced that they were ending their service in the UK at the end of August, to become a partner for other established operators, including Orange in the UK and Vodafone in the Netherlands.

The Blyk service in the United Kingdom ended for all members on 26 August 2009. Blyk became instead a partner to other established operators, globally. According to their website, they were working with Vodafone in the Netherlands, Aircel in India and with Orange in the United Kingdom.

== Reaction ==
The response from the British press towards Blyk placed its emphasis on debating the potential effectiveness of mobile-based advertising, with concerns that it may prove intrusive in a similar manner to pop-ups on websites or spam email. The Guardian commented that "advertisers will have to be careful not to annoy their new users with the mobile equivalent of spam", with Channel 4 stating that the fact that "you have to suffer the ads" was the network's downside. Tech Digest also noted that if advertisers don't embrace the interactivity offered by the network, they may have to resort to spam.

Channel 4's technology correspondent Benjamin Cohen also raised the issue that targeting individuals with advertising for brands such as McDonald's and Coca-Cola could open up a debate about childhood obesity.

Other sources, however, praised the network's approach to its adverts, whereby users can respond to messages they receive free-of-charge to receive a more personal service. SMS Text News stated that this aspect of the network "may well be extremely welcome", and The Times reported that certain analysts believed that Blyk "could provide a boost to the nascent market in mobile marketing".

== Market ==
Blyk was distinguished by the age restriction that it operated for its membership. The 16-24 age range is exclusive and was applied by means of ID checks with several national databases during sign up. Members who joined before turning 25 were not removed from the network on their 25th birthday, but were unable to rejoin if they left.

Membership was by invitation only, available via special promotions and from existing members. Potential members joined the network via its website. As part of the process they were asked a range of profiling questions. Blyk used the information it gathered to target them with relevant advertising messages at a rate of up to 6 a day. On 25 September 2007 it was reported by telegraph.co.uk that the company had secured 44 brands for blyk's service, including Coca-Cola, NatWest, Boots Group, and MasterCard.

On 24 April 2008, Blyk announced that they had reached their twelve-month target of 100,000 clients six months ahead of schedule.

== Relaunch ==
In May 2010, Blyk launched its service in the Netherlands. The service was created in partnership with Vodafone, and it gives targeted ads and content to the young (16- to 29-year-olds) and monthly free Blyk-to-Blyk calls and limited free texts to other networks. The launch advertisers included Beachmasters, Universal Pictures, McDonald's, Pearle, and Electronic Arts.
