= Symbio =

Nordic folk band

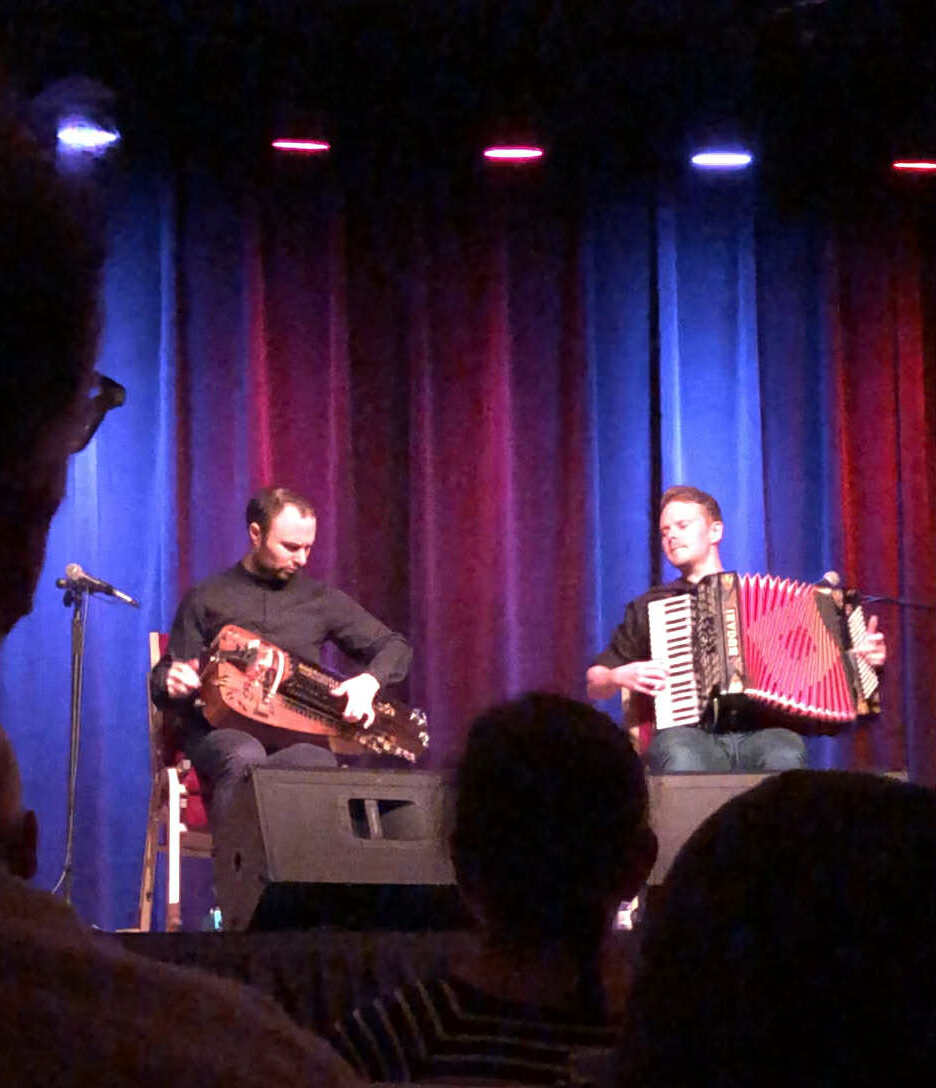
- Symbio in 2022

Background information
- Origin: Sweden
- Years active: Since 2011
- Members: LarsEmil Öjeberget; Johannes Geworkian Hellman
- Website: symbiomusic.com

Symbio are a Swedish folk band composed of LarsEmil Öjeberget and Johannes Geworkian Hellman.

== Band members ==
- LarsEmil Öjeberget – Accordion, stomp box, and electronics
- Johannes Geworkian Hellman – Hurdy-gurdy and electronics

== Discography ==
=== Albums ===
- Phoresy (2016)
- Rising (2018)
- Endeavor (2022)
