= Pekka Ala-Pietilä =

Finnish businessman

Pekka Ala-Pietilä (born 13 January 1957) is CEO and co-founder of Blyk. He was also President of Nokia Corporation (1999–2005) and President of Nokia Mobile Phones (1992–1998). Born in Asikkala, he holds an honorary Doctor in Technology from Tampere University of Technology and in Science from the University of Helsinki, and is a Knight 1st Class of the Order of the White Rose of Finland.
