= Hybrid Graphics =

Graphics software technology company

Hybrid Graphics Ltd. was a graphics software technology company active from 1994 to 2007 in Helsinki, Finland. Acquired by Nvidia in 2006, Hybrid Graphics is now Nvidia Corporation's Helsinki office.

== History ==
Until the year 2000, Hybrid was widely known for its middleware solutions for computer games. Hybrid's other business sector was image-making using 3D graphics, this operation was spun off in 2004 as Fake Graphics Ltd. The company's most important product of that time was the OpenGL based graphics library SurRender 3D (1996–2000). In 2000 Hybrid launched the dPVS (dynamic Potentially Visible Set) visibility optimization middleware that is used in many MMORPGs, including Star Wars Galaxies and EverQuest II. In 2006 the dPVS technology was acquired by Umbra Software Ltd.

Hybrid Graphics provided the first commercial implementations of the OpenGL ES and OpenVG mobile graphics APIs, and was actively involved in the development of the M3G (JSR-184) Java standard, in the context of the Khronos Group and Java Community Process, respectively. Hybrid also sponsored academic research on computer graphics, including multiple papers published in SIGGRAPH.
