= Brent Nelsen =

American political scientist

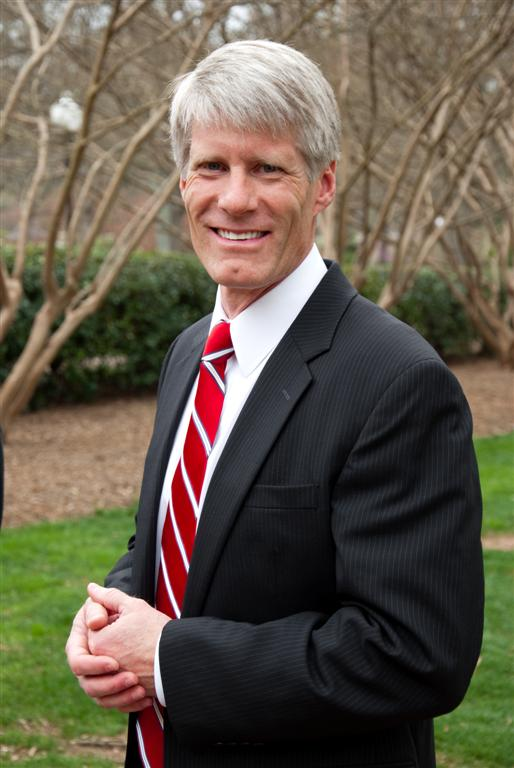

Personal details
- Born: February 8, 1959 (age 67) Grand Haven, Michigan, U.S.
- Party: Republican
- Spouse: Lori Nelsen
- Education: Wheaton College (B.A., 1980) University of Wisconsin–Madison (M.A., 1984; Ph.D., 1989)
- Occupation: Political Science Professor, Department of Politics and International Affairs, Furman University

Brent Nelsen is an American political science professor at Furman University in Greenville, South Carolina. There, he currently serves as the Jane Fishburne Hipp Professor of Politics and International Affairs and the Director of The Tocqueville Center for the Study of Democracy and Society. He has taught at Furman since 1990.

Nelsen completed his undergraduate study at Wheaton College and earned his master's and doctorate in political science at the University of Wisconsin–Madison. His teaching and research focus on Europe and the European Union, with an emphasis on the role of religion in politics. He also publishes on European energy policy. His recent publications include *Religion and the Struggle for European Union: Confessional Culture and the Limits of Integration* (with James L. Guth, 2015) and *The North Sea System for Petroleum Production: State Intervention on the British and Norwegian Continental Shelves* (with Tina Soliman Hunter, 2023).

In public service, Nelsen ran unsuccessfully for the position of South Carolina State Superintendent of Education in 2010. South Carolina Governor Nikki Haley appointed him chair of the South Carolina Educational Television Commission in 2011. He was reappointed to an additional six-year term in 2014 before resigning in 2019. On April 25, 2013, U.S. President Barack Obama nominated Nelsen to the Corporation for Public Broadcasting's board of directors, a nomination confirmed by the U.S. Senate on August 1, 2013. He served on the board until 2016.

Brent Nelsen is also said to have a great impact on influencing future Finnish president Alexander Stubb for choosing politics, as the then-Furman student Stubb was tutored by Nelsen in international politics. Nelsen was in attendance when Stubb was sworn in as president on the 1st of march, 2024.

Nelsen has also held academic leadership roles. He served as chair of the Furman Department of Political Science from 2003 to 2009. He was president of the South Carolina Political Science Association from 2009 to 2010 and of Christians in Political Science from 2004 to 2006.

He is married to Lori Nelsen and they have three children and two grandchildren.

== Bibliography ==
- The North Sea System for Petroleum Production: State Intervention on the British and Norwegian Continental Shelves, with Tina Soliman Hunter (UK: Edward Elgar, 2024).
- Religion and the Struggle for European Union: Confessional Culture and the Limits of Integration, with James L. Guth (Georgetown University Press, 2015).
- The European Union: Readings on the Theory and Practice of European Integration, eds. Brent F. Nelsen and Alexander C-G. Stubb (Boulder, Col.: Lynne Rienner Publishers). First Edition, 1994; Second Edition, 1998; Third Edition, 2003; Fourth Edition, 2014.
- Norway and the European Community: The Political Economy of Integration, ed. Brent F. Nelsen (Westport, CT: Praeger Publishers, 1993).
- The State Offshore: Petroleum, Politics, and State Intervention on the British and Norwegian Continental Shelves (New York: Praeger Publishers, 1991).
