= Alexander Stubb =

President of Finland since 2024

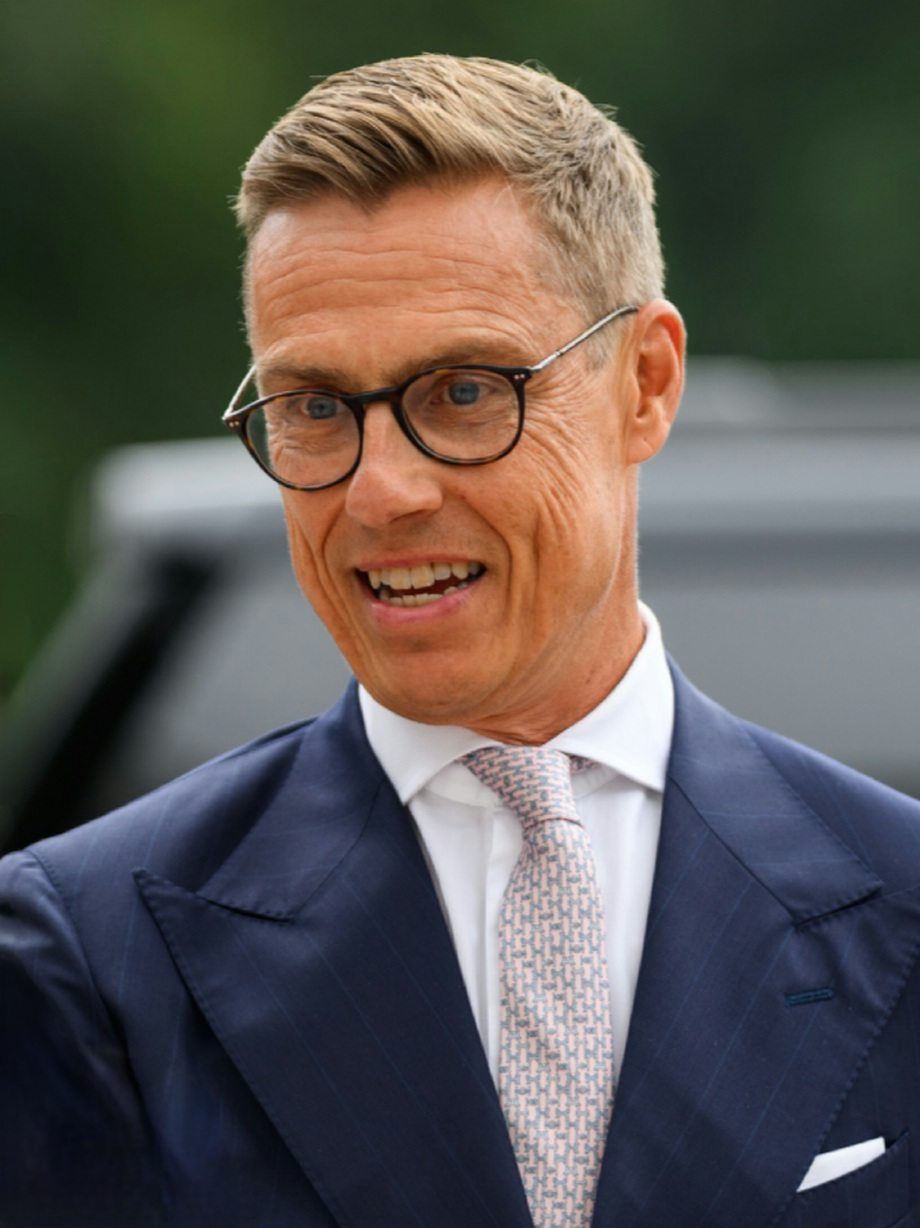
- Stubb in 2025

13th President of Finland
- Incumbent
- Assumed office 1 March 2024
- Prime Minister: Petteri Orpo
- Preceded by: Sauli Niinistö

43rd Prime Minister of Finland
- In office 24 June 2014 – 29 May 2015
- President: Sauli Niinistö
- Deputy: Antti Rinne
- Preceded by: Jyrki Katainen
- Succeeded by: Juha Sipilä
Ministerial positions
Minister of Finance
In office 29 May 2015 – 22 June 2016
Prime Minister	Juha Sipilä
Preceded by	Antti Rinne
Succeeded by	Petteri Orpo
Minister for European Affairs and Trade
In office 22 June 2011 – 24 June 2014
Prime Minister	Jyrki Katainen
Preceded by	Astrid Thors
Succeeded by	Lenita Toivakka
Minister for Foreign Affairs
In office 4 April 2008 – 22 June 2011
Prime Minister	Matti Vanhanen; Mari Kiviniemi
Preceded by	Ilkka Kanerva
Succeeded by	Erkki Tuomioja

Leader of the National Coalition Party
- In office 14 June 2014 – 11 June 2016
- Preceded by: Jyrki Katainen
- Succeeded by: Petteri Orpo

Member of the Finnish Parliament for Uusimaa
- In office 20 April 2011 – 30 July 2017

Member of the European Parliament for Finland
- In office 20 July 2004 – 3 April 2008

Personal details
- Born: Cai-Göran Alexander Stubb; 1 April 1968 (age 58) Helsinki, Finland
- Party: Independent (since 2024)
- Other political affiliations: National Coalition (until 2024)
- Spouse: Suzanne Innes (m. 1998)
- Children: 2
- Relatives: Göran Stubb (father); Kai Setälä (maternal grandfather)
- Education: Furman University (BA); Sorbonne University (GrDip); College of Europe (MA); London School of Economics (PhD)
- Website: Official website

Military service
- Allegiance: Finland
- Branch/service: Finnish Army
- Rank: Lance corporal

Cai-Göran Alexander Stubb (Note: Finland Swedish pronunciation: [ˈkɑi ˈjœːrɑn ɑlekˈsɑndær ˈstʉbː]) (born 1 April 1968) is a Finnish politician serving as the president of Finland since 2024. A member of the National Coalition Party, he previously served as prime minister of Finland from 2014 to 2015 and has held several senior ministerial posts since 2008.

Rising in politics as a researcher specialised in the European Union, he was elected to the European Parliament in 2004 and was appointed Minister for Foreign Affairs in 2008. In 2011, he was elected to the Parliament of Finland and was later appointed Minister for European Affairs and Trade in the Cabinet of Jyrki Katainen.

In 2014, Stubb succeeded Katainen as leader of the National Coalition Party and was appointed prime minister by President Sauli Niinistö on 24 June, forming a five-party coalition government. Following his party's loss in the 2015 parliamentary election, he served as Minister of Finance under Prime Minister Juha Sipilä. After losing the party leadership to Petteri Orpo in June 2016, Stubb stepped down as finance minister and resigned from parliament in 2017 to become vice-president of the European Investment Bank. He later served as director and professor at the European University Institute's School of Transnational Governance until 2023.

In 2023, Stubb announced his candidacy in the 2024 Finnish presidential election. He won the second round with 51.6% of the vote against former foreign minister Pekka Haavisto and took office as president in March 2024. Stubb is the second Finland-Swedish president in Finland's history, after Carl Gustaf Emil Mannerheim, and the first to be elected to the office.

== Early life and education ==
Stubb was born in Helsinki into a bilingual family; his father, Göran Stubb, is a native Swedish-speaker and his mother, Christel Stubb (née Setälä), was a native Finnish speaker. Stubb spoke both languages at home. While Stubb is a native of Helsinki, he has family roots from the Pedersöre municipality located in the Swedish-speaking Ostrobothnia, where there is also a village called Stubb. (Note: The name Stubb is Swedish, probably meaning "stump".) His father worked in the business of professional ice hockey; he was the CEO of the Finnish Ice Hockey Association from 1976 to 1983, and also worked as the NHL Director of Euro Scouting. Through his mother, he is descended from the Setälä family, and his maternal grandfather was professor Kai Setälä.

Stubb spent his childhood in Lehtisaari, Helsinki. He played ice hockey in HIFK until his teen years. He started playing golf when he was twelve years old and during high school played in the Finnish national golf team. In 1986, Stubb graduated from Mainland High School in Daytona Beach, Florida, U.S., and, two years later, graduated from Gymnasiet Lärkan in Helsinki, then completed his military service at Santahamina.

Stubb won a golf scholarship to Furman University in Greenville, South Carolina, U.S. He was a member of the Finnish national golf team and intended to become a professional golfer after graduation, but studying with political scientist Brent Nelsen and other faculty caused him to quit golf after a year to focus on his studies. Stubb graduated with a BA degree in political science from Furman University in 1993.

The following year he studied French and obtained a diploma in French Language and Civilisation from the Sorbonne University, Paris, in 1994. Stubb speaks five languages: Swedish, Finnish, English and French fluently (the first three without any meaningful accent), and to a lesser extent German.

In 1995, Stubb graduated with an MA degree in political science (European affairs) from the College of Europe in Bruges, Belgium. He then went on to pursue a doctorate at the London School of Economics and Political Science under the supervision of William Wallace, Baron Wallace of Saltaire, obtaining his PhD degree in international relations in June 1999. Wallace later said: "LSE has had a number of extremely bright Finnish students in recent years – but Alex was one of the most outstanding." Stubb's thesis was called Flexible Integration and the Amsterdam Treaty: negotiating differentiation in the 1996–97 IGC and it dealt with the 1996–97 Intergovernmental Conference of the European Union.

== Early career ==
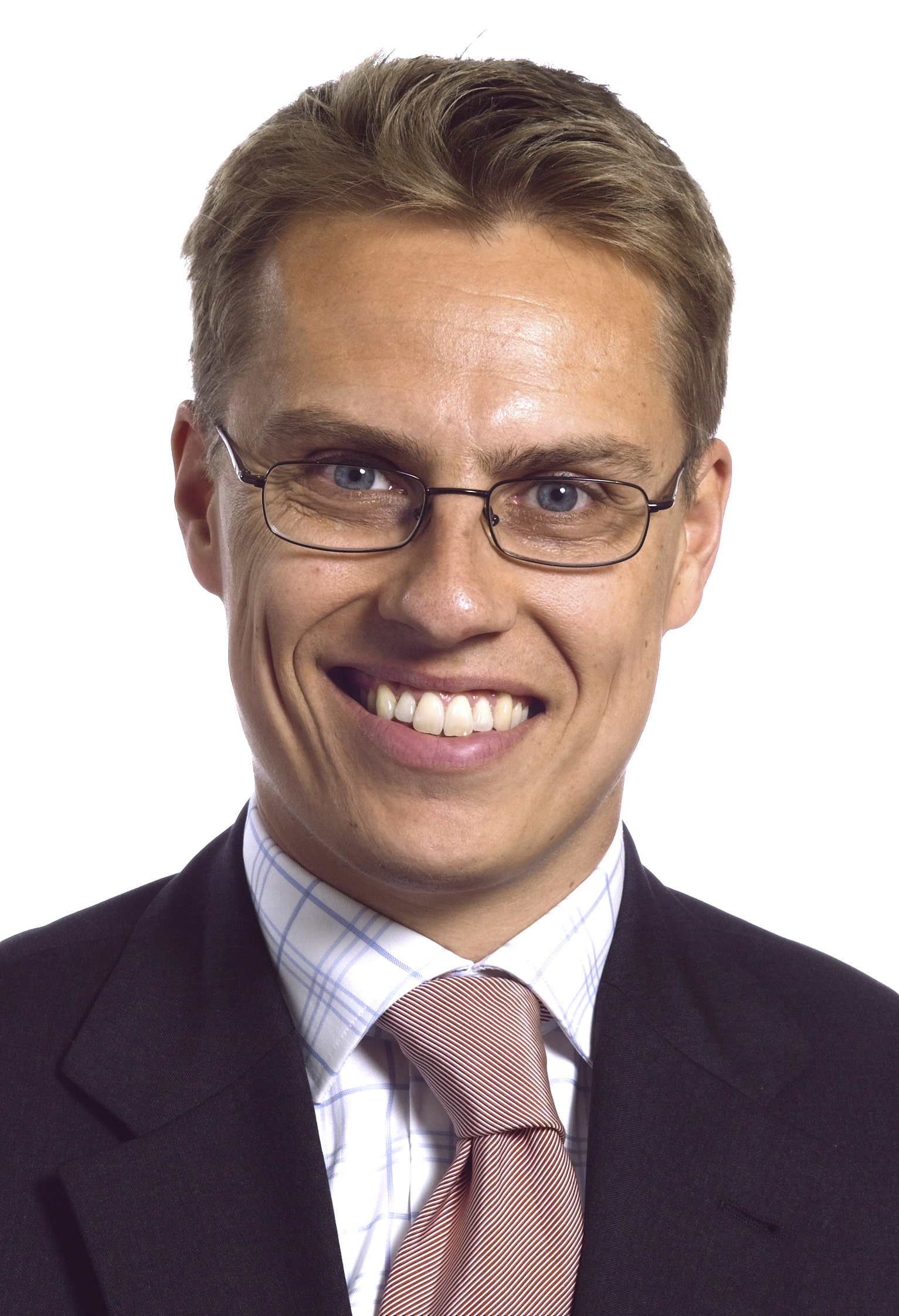
Stubb's portrait as an MEP, 2004

Between 1995 and 1997, Stubb was a researcher at the Finnish Ministry for Foreign Affairs, and later at the Academy of Finland from 1997 to 1999. In 1997 he began to work also as a columnist.

From 1999 to 2001, Stubb was a researcher at the Permanent Representation of Finland to the EU in Brussels, and a member of the Finnish government's delegation to the intergovernmental negotiations for the Treaty of Nice. In 2000, he became a visiting professor at the College of Europe. Following the IGC's conclusion in 2001 he became an adviser to the President of the European Commission Romano Prodi and a member of the Commission Task Force on the European Convention. In 2003 he returned to Finland's Representation to the EU as a counsellor. When that ended in 2004, he stood for the National Coalition Party in the election to the European Parliament.

== Political career ==
=== European Parliament (2004–2008) ===
Stubb served as an MEP for Finland from 2004 to 2008. He was elected in 2004 with 115,225 votes (the second highest number of votes in Finland for that election) as a member of the National Coalition Party. As that party was a member of the EPP, he sat in the European People's Party-European Democrats group. During this time he became one of the most well-known members of the Parliament.

Stubb was a member of the Committee on Budgetary Control and a vice-president of the Committee on Internal Market and Consumer Protection. He was a substitute member of the Committee on Constitutional Affairs and the Delegation to the EU-Turkey Joint Parliamentary Committee (as of August 2007).

In 2006, he wrote a report for the Parliament on the EU's interpretation costs, which was adopted by the Parliament. He called for greater awareness of the costs of translation, which he calculated as 511 million euros in 2005 for the Parliament, Commission and Council together. Despite the costs and the need for some changes, he underlined that multilingualism is one of the EU's main assets.

Stubb was vice-president of European Parliament Intergroup on LGBT Rights.

=== Minister for Foreign Affairs (2008–2011) ===
On 1 April 2008, Stubb's 40th birthday, the Finnish government announced that Stubb would be appointed its new Minister for Foreign Affairs following a scandal surrounding his predecessor, Ilkka Kanerva. Stubb was sworn in on 4 April. The decision to appoint him was unanimous and his seat in the European Parliament was taken up by Sirpa Pietikäinen, a former environment minister.

On his appointment, Stubb was described as a competent politician and a supporter of Finland's accession to NATO, stating that he does not understand Finland's non-alignment policy.

In July 2010, Stubb invited the head of Al-Jazeera Wadah Khanfar and former President Martti Ahtisaari to discuss about the role of media in conflict resolution. In October 2010, Stubb visited the Middle East and discussed the Middle Eastern conflict with U.S. Secretary of State Hillary Clinton.

In 2010, Stubb and Sweden's Minister for Foreign Affairs Carl Bildt proposed the European Institute of Peace. They developed a joint non-paper that was addressed to EU High Representative Catherine Ashton. They referred to the limits of traditional diplomacy and emphasised the added value that capacities beyond those available to high-level decision-makers could have. At the same time, the idea of a European Institute of Peace gained increasing attention among members of the European Parliament (MEP) and was particularly supported by German MEP Franziska Brantner and French MEP Alain Lamassoure. The institute was founded in 2014.

In 2010 Stubb and Finnish sign language rapper Signmark – who had become the first deaf person to sign a recording contract with an international record company – worked together to organize Silent Shout event to support sign language speakers. Stubb and Signmark also later collaborated for bringing attention to disabled people in international forums.

Stubb does not believe the President of Finland needs to attend meetings of the European Council in addition to the Prime Minister. Jyrki Katainen, the Finnish Finance Minister and chairman of National Coalition Party, supported Stubb stating he was surprising, courageous and that he "puts a smile on one's face".

As the Foreign Minister of Finland, Stubb was the Chairman-in-Office of the Organization for Security and Co-operation in Europe from 5 April 2008 to 31 December 2008. The Russo-Georgian War occurred during this period, and OSCE brokered an agreement to send military observers to the area.

In January 2011, Stubb and EU Foreign Commissioner Catherine Ashton worked together to help hundreds of beaten and imprisoned opposition activists in Belarus.

During the 2011 Egyptian revolution, Stubb expressed hope that power in Egypt would be transferred to a democratically elected government as fast as possible and without violence.

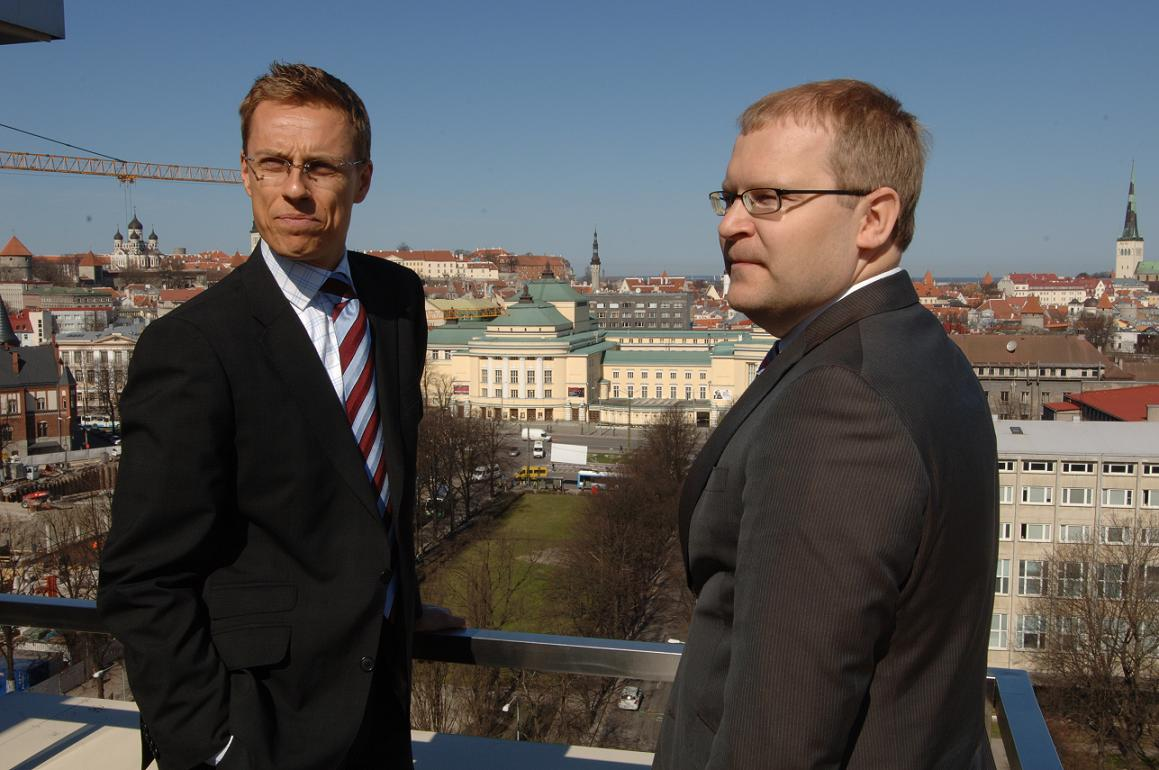
Stubb with Urmas Paet, Estonian Minister of Foreign Affairs (at the time), in 2008

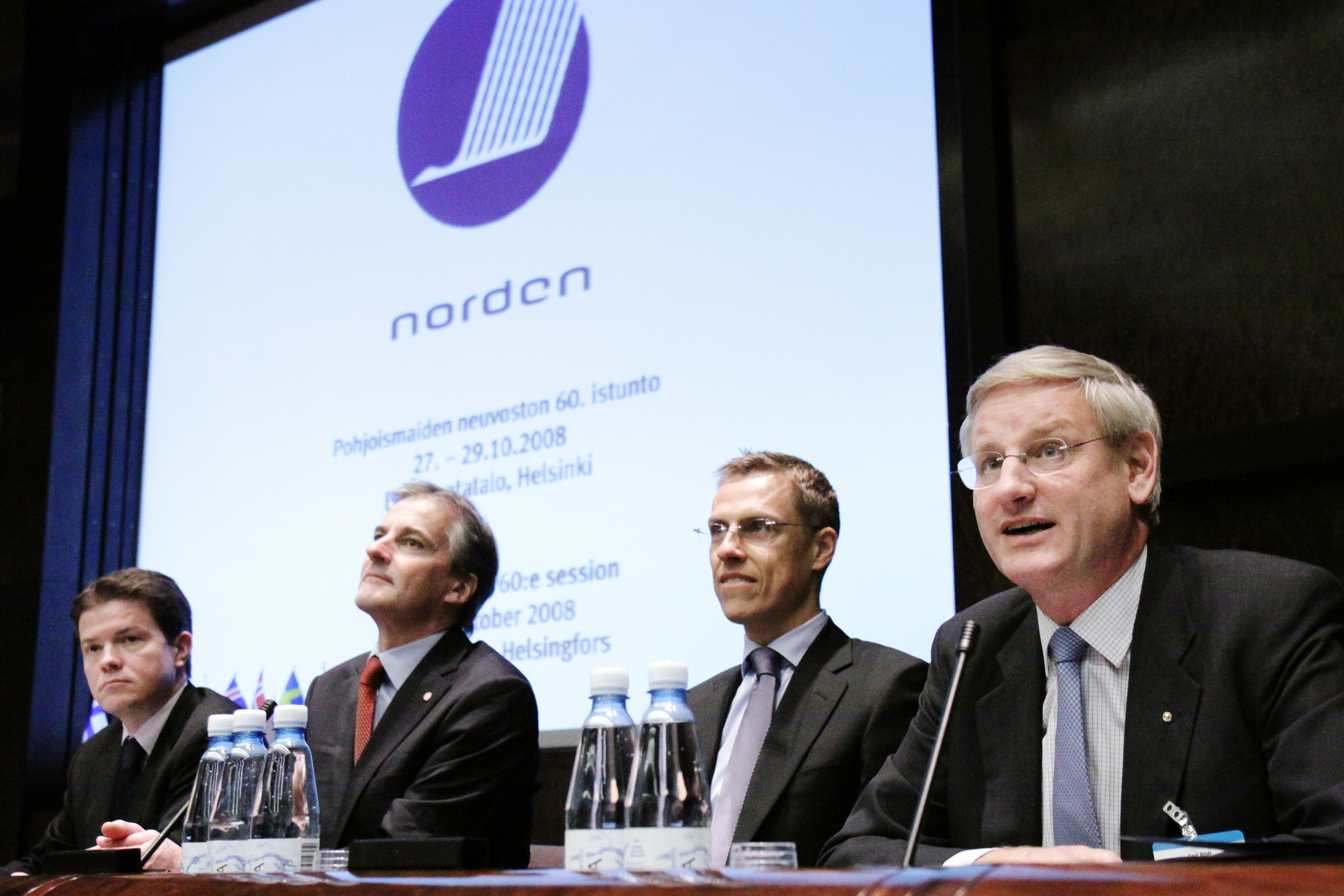
Stubb in Nordic Council in 2008

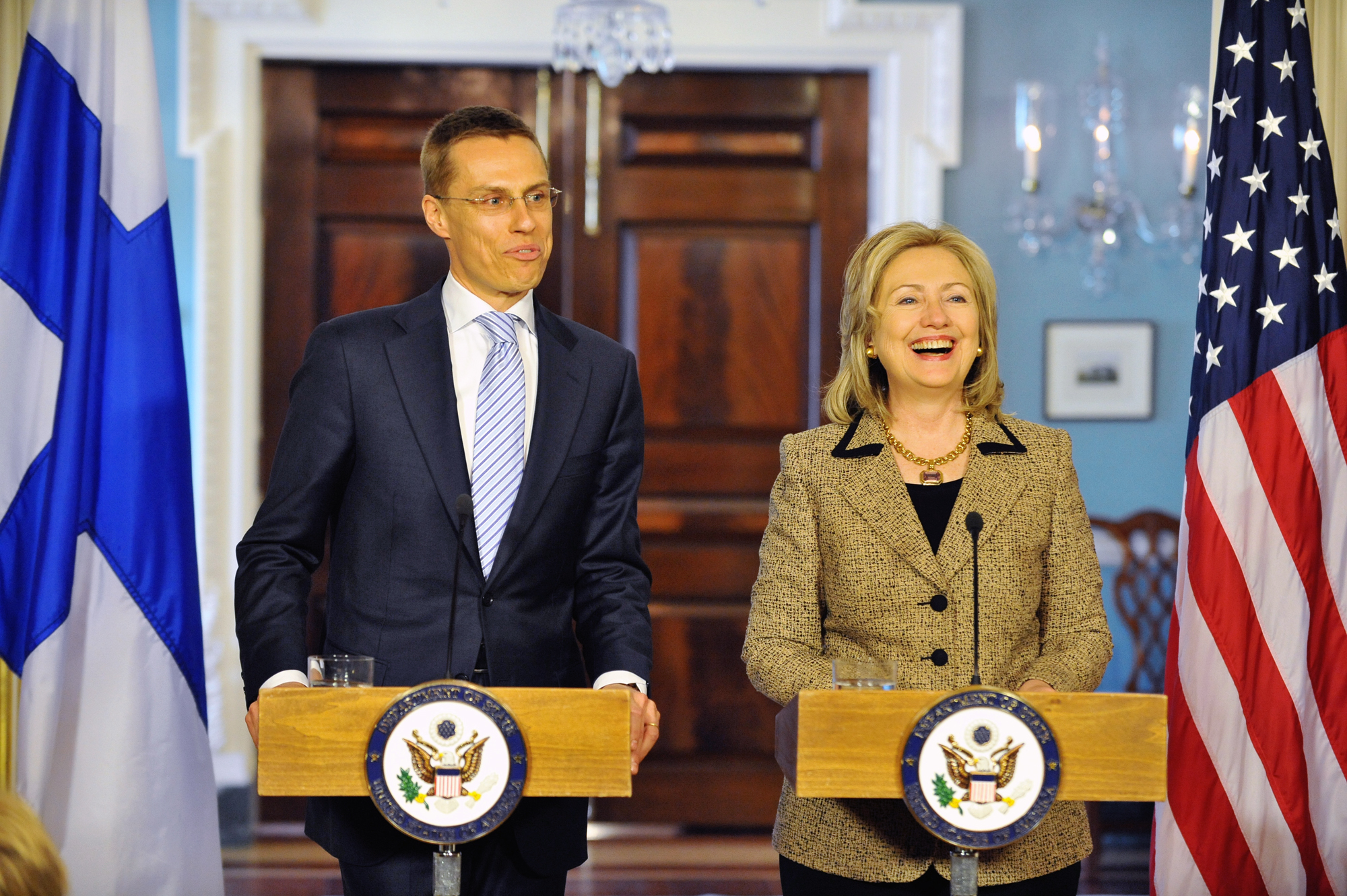
Stubb with the Secretary of State Hillary Clinton in 2011

=== Minister for European Affairs and Foreign Trade (2011–2014) ===
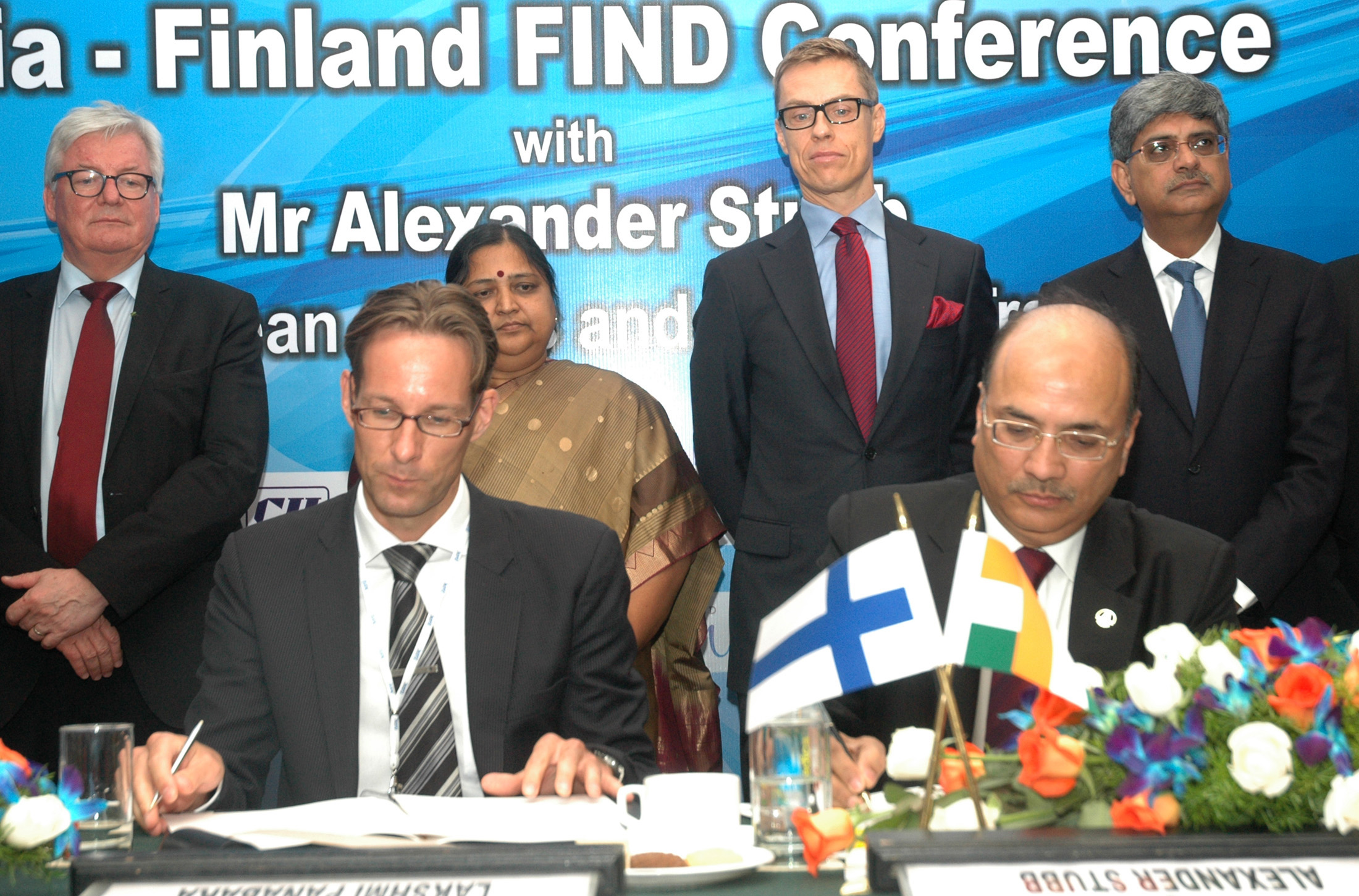
Stubb in India, 2013

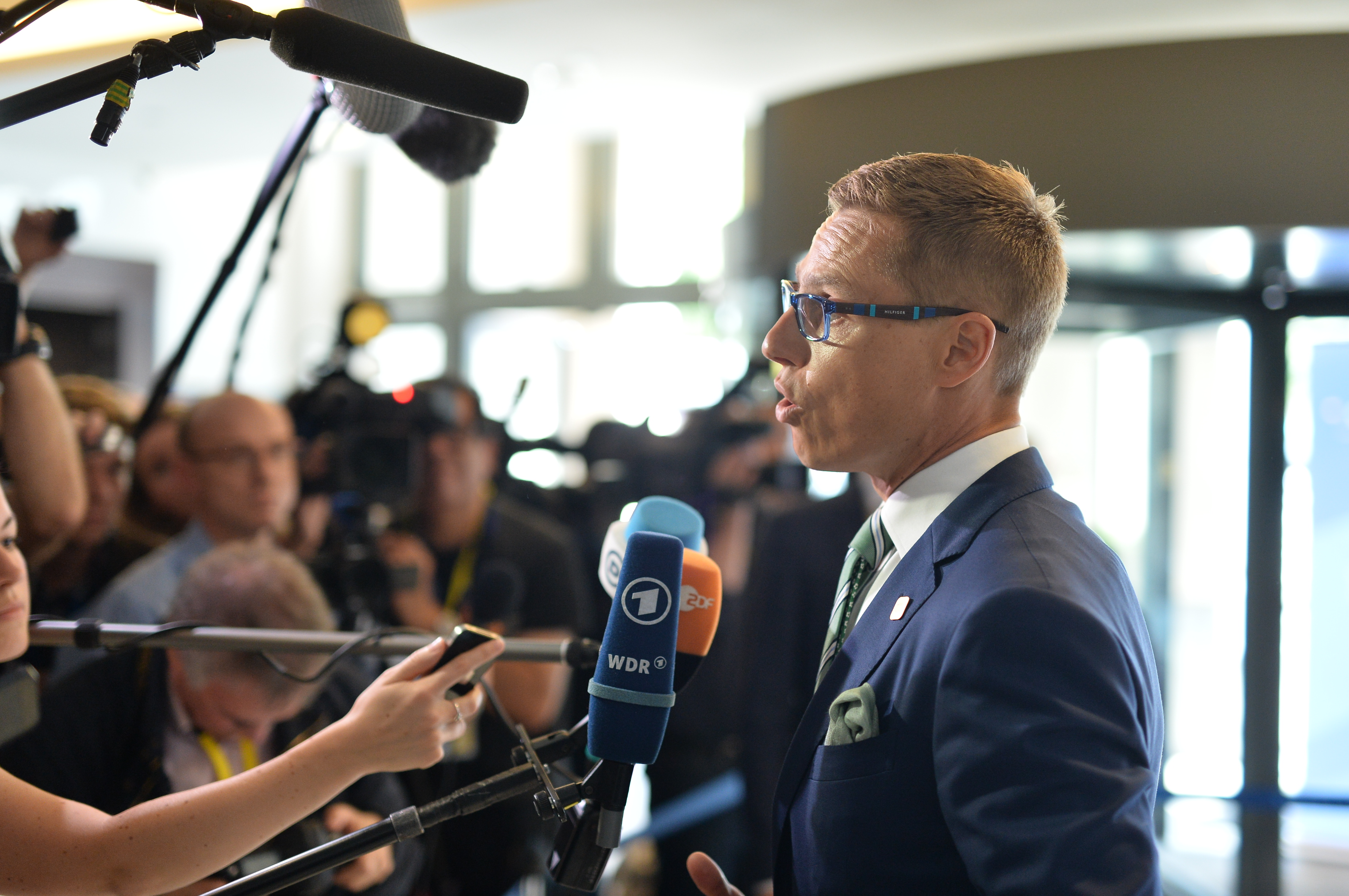
Stubb in the EPP Summit in July 2014

In 2011, Stubb stood for election to the Finnish Parliament for the first time and was elected MP. He was the second-most-popular candidate in the election, in which the National Coalition Party became the largest party. In the government negotiations the Foreign Affairs ministerial portfolio went to the Social Democrats. Stubb became Minister for Europe and Foreign Trade in Jyrki Katainen's cabinet.

During Euromaidan, Stubb argued that money should be used as a force for good in geo-political relations, stating: "As I have said before, money is the best peace mediator" and "Money should be given the Nobel Peace Prize". (As Prime Minister he would later change his stance after further escalation in Eastern Ukraine, describing EU's sanctions against Russia necessary.) Stubb stated that the sanctions against Russia would not be removed until Russia met the requirements set by the EU.

=== Prime Minister (2014–2015) ===
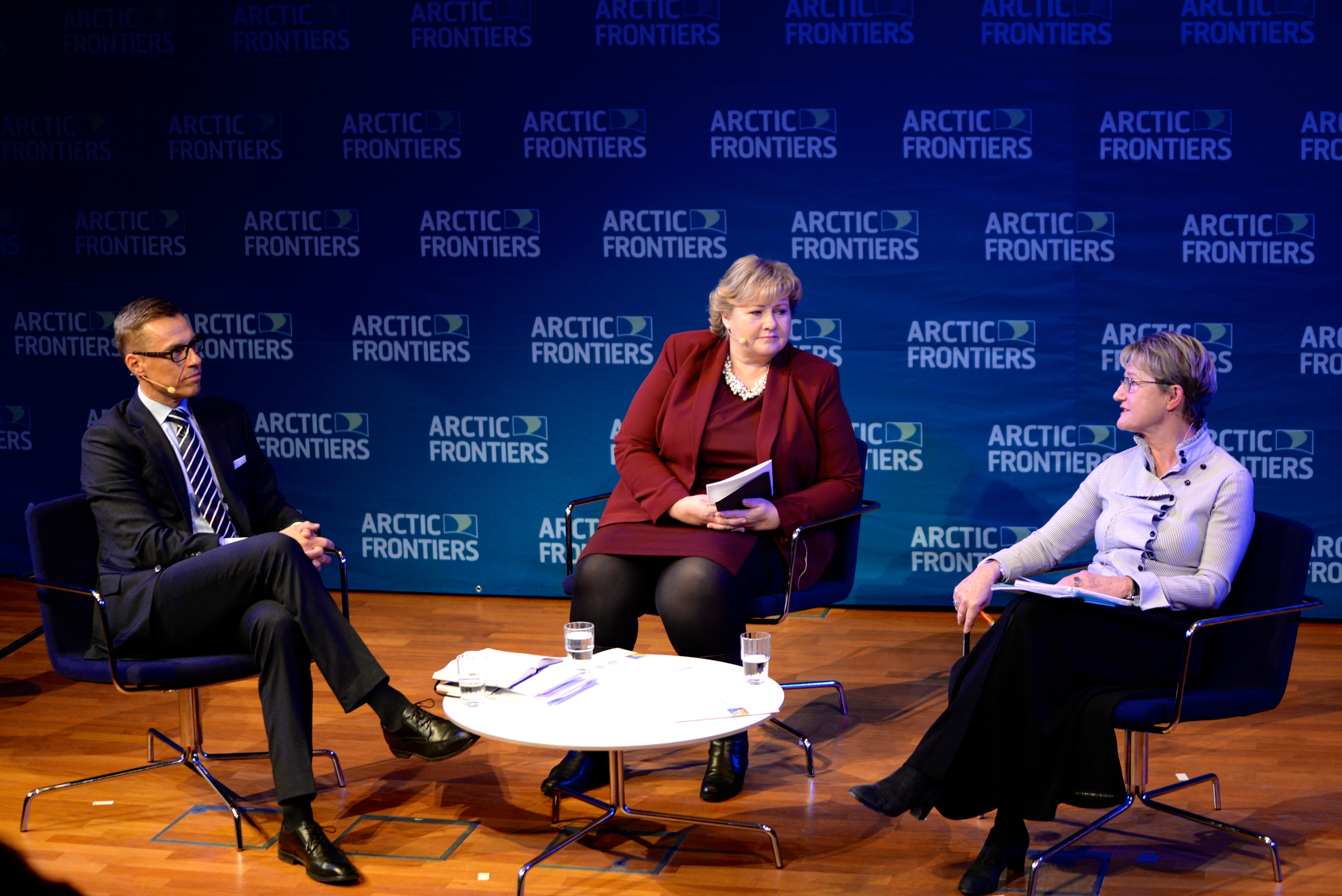
Alexander Stubb, Erna Solberg & Kristina Persson in 2015

When Jyrki Katainen stepped down as Prime Minister and Chairman of the National Coalition Party, Stubb was elected as party chairman in June 2014 over his two rivals, Paula Risikko and Jan Vapaavuori. He formed a five party government coalition, and was officially appointed Prime Minister by President Sauli Niinistö on 24 June. One of the challenges the Prime Minister faced is the relationship between Finland and neighboring Russia. This had always been a difficult issue for Finland, as it affected Finland's willingness to become a NATO member. The Russo-Ukrainian war as well as the dispute over free trade between Russia and Finland made the issue thornier.

Stubb supported the proposal to implement basic income experiments in the country. In November 2014, Stubb organized Northern Future Forum, a meeting of Prime Ministers of Northern Europe, in Startup Sauna in Aalto University campus. In March 2015, Stubb invited companies and officials to an event to discuss industrial Internet and Internet of Things.

In the election held in April 2015, Stubb's National Coalition Party lost its status as the largest party, coming in as second in vote share and third in seats. Coalition negotiations began on 8 May between the winning Center Party, Finns Party and National Coalition Party. He resigned from the office days after the election and left office on 29 May 2015.

=== Minister of Finance (2015–2016) ===
Stubb was appointed Minister of Finance on 29 May 2015 by newly elected Prime Minister Juha Sipilä. Stubb demanded "structural reforms, structural reforms and more structural reforms". In November 2015, Stubb said at the Finnish Parliament that about 90 percent of the Finnish authoritatives supported introduction of administrative registration. However, it was revealed that in reality only about 10 percent of them supported it.

Stubb's term as Minister of Finance drew criticism due to his perceived insensitivity towards the effects of the spending cuts he introduced, which affected the Finnish welfare state and public education system. An instance of Stubb and Sipilä bumping fists after the end of a conference that announced a deal between Finnish trade unions and the Confederation of Finnish Industries was interpreted as a sign of mockery towards the trade unions.

In November and December 2015, Stubb was in the middle of a scandal when he was accused of lying to the Finnish Parliament consistently and deliberately. In November, Stubb had said to Parliament that 90 percent of the experts who had given a statement were supporting the government's pact to make it possible for Finns to own publicly listed companies' stock through nominee accounts. The real number was 10 percent, opposite of what Stubb had said. Chancellor of Justice Jaakko Jonkka received multiple complaints over Stubb. In his reply, Jonkka stated that Stubb's mistake in numbers was not deliberate, but was rather an unfortunate, whilst understandable, result of a fast-paced discussion over a policy draft.

Partly as a result of a series of Stubb's gaffes, such as insensitive tweets, in spring 2016, MP Elina Lepomäki and Minister of Interior Petteri Orpo announced that they would challenge Stubb in June's party conference. On 11 June, Stubb lost the election against Orpo, who became the new leader of the National Coalition Party. Orpo soon announced that he would take Stubb's seat as the Minister of Finance. In return, he offered Stubb the role of Minister for European Affairs and Foreign Trade, but Stubb declined and decided to continue as a Member of Parliament.

=== European Investment Bank VP (2017–2020) ===
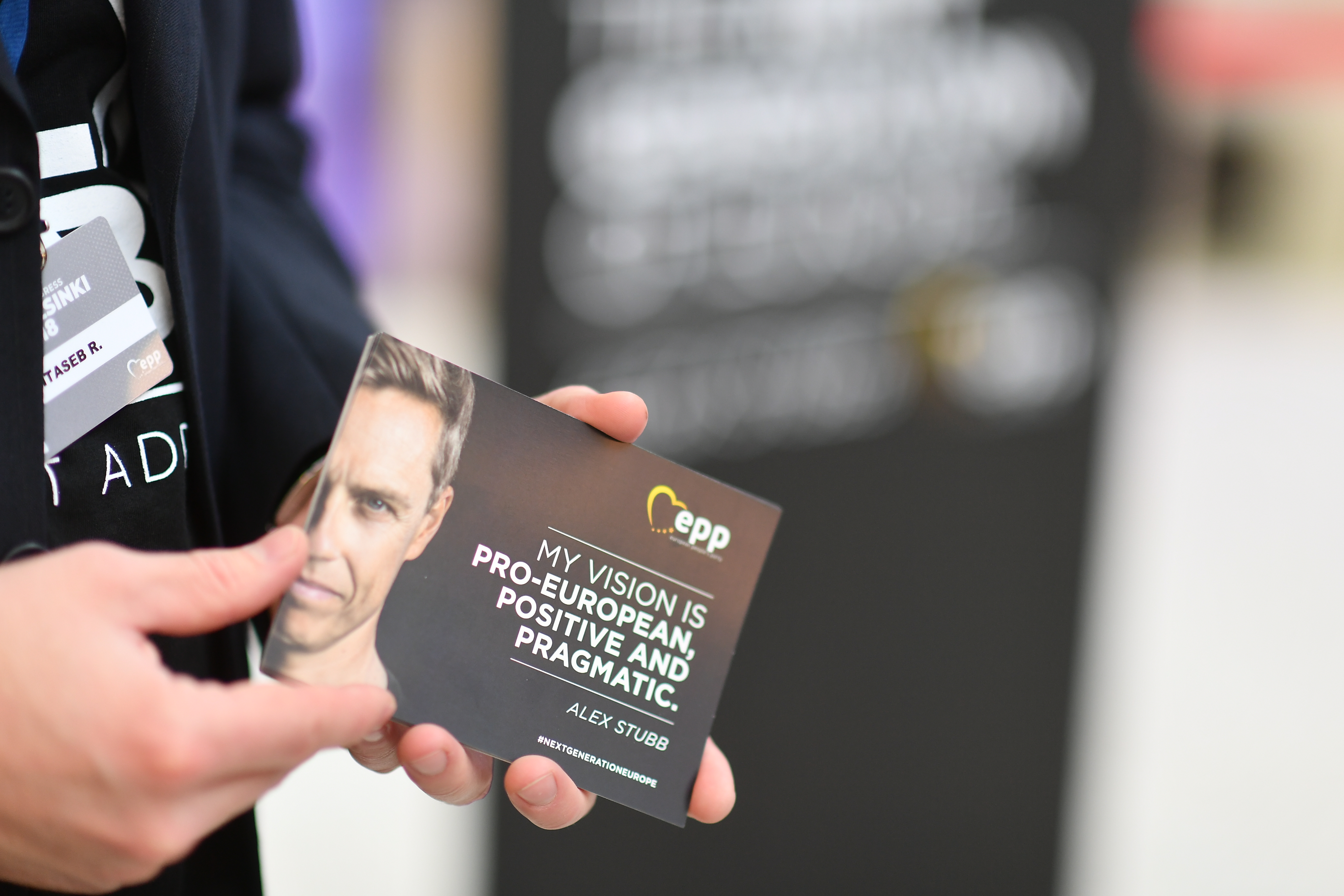
Alexander Stubb's 2018 European People's Party candidate card

On 15 June 2017, Stubb was chosen as the vice-president of the European Investment Bank, after the previous representative from Finland Jan Vapaavuori had vacated the seat. He left his duties in the Parliament on 30 July 2017 in order to assume his new position. Stubb later commented that he had no interest in returning to the Finnish politics, but could be interested in running for the presidency of the European Commission or European Council.

In June 2017, Stubb was nominated by former President Martti Ahtisaari to assume the leadership of the Crisis Management Initiative, a non-governmental organisation that works to prevent and resolve conflicts. His position was confirmed by the board on 29 November 2017.

On 2 October 2018, Stubb launched his bid for presidency of the European Commission as the lead candidate of the European People's Party. On 8 November 2018, Stubb lost in EPP's Spitzenkandidat election against Manfred Weber, the group leader for the European People's Party in the European Parliament.

=== Professor (2020–2024) ===
In January 2020, as Stubb's term at the European Investment Bank was ending, he was chosen as the director and professor of the School of Transnational Governance-based within the European University Institute in Florence, Italy. He started in the position on 1 May 2020.

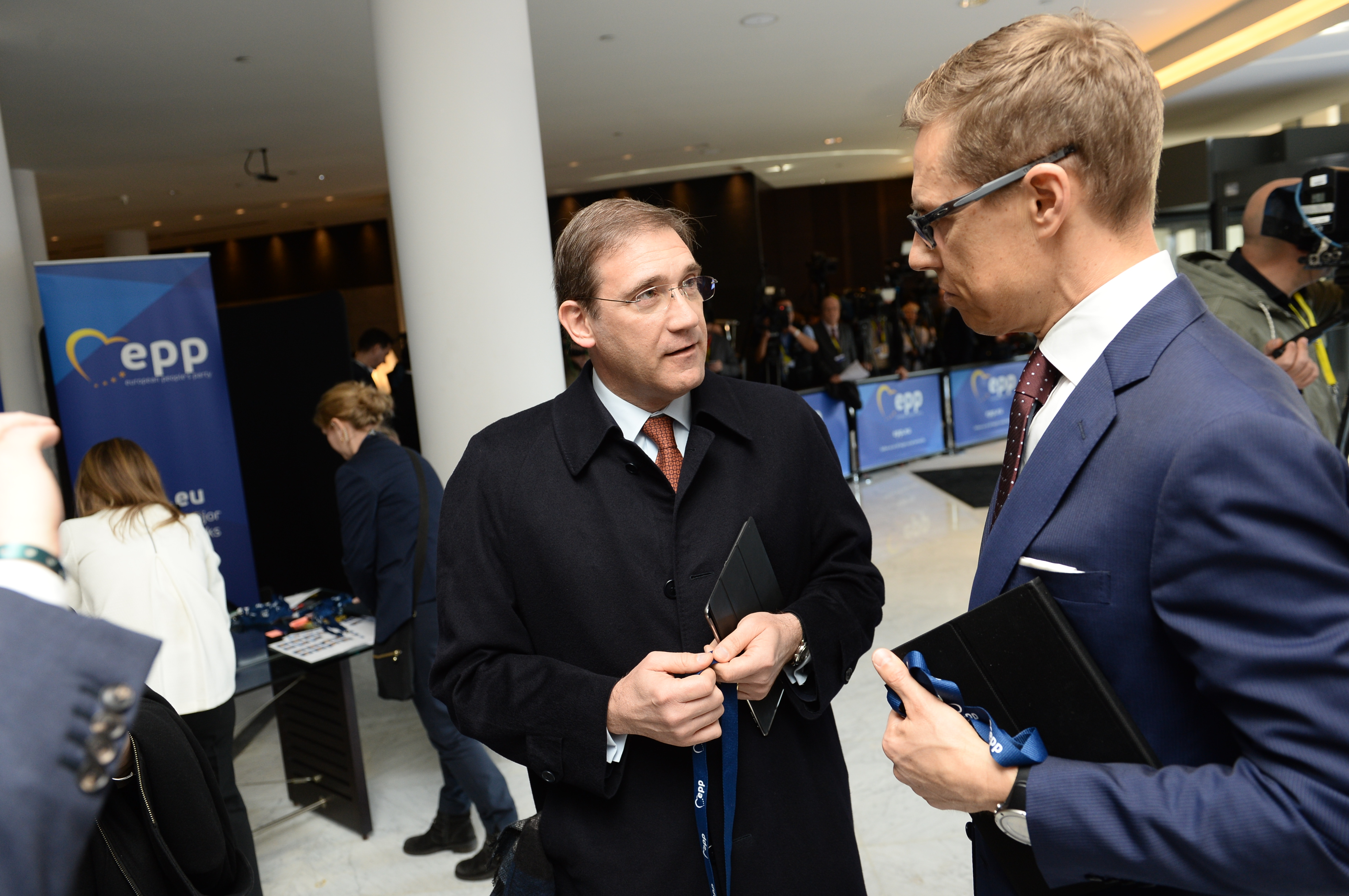
Stubb and Pedro Passos Coelho in 2016

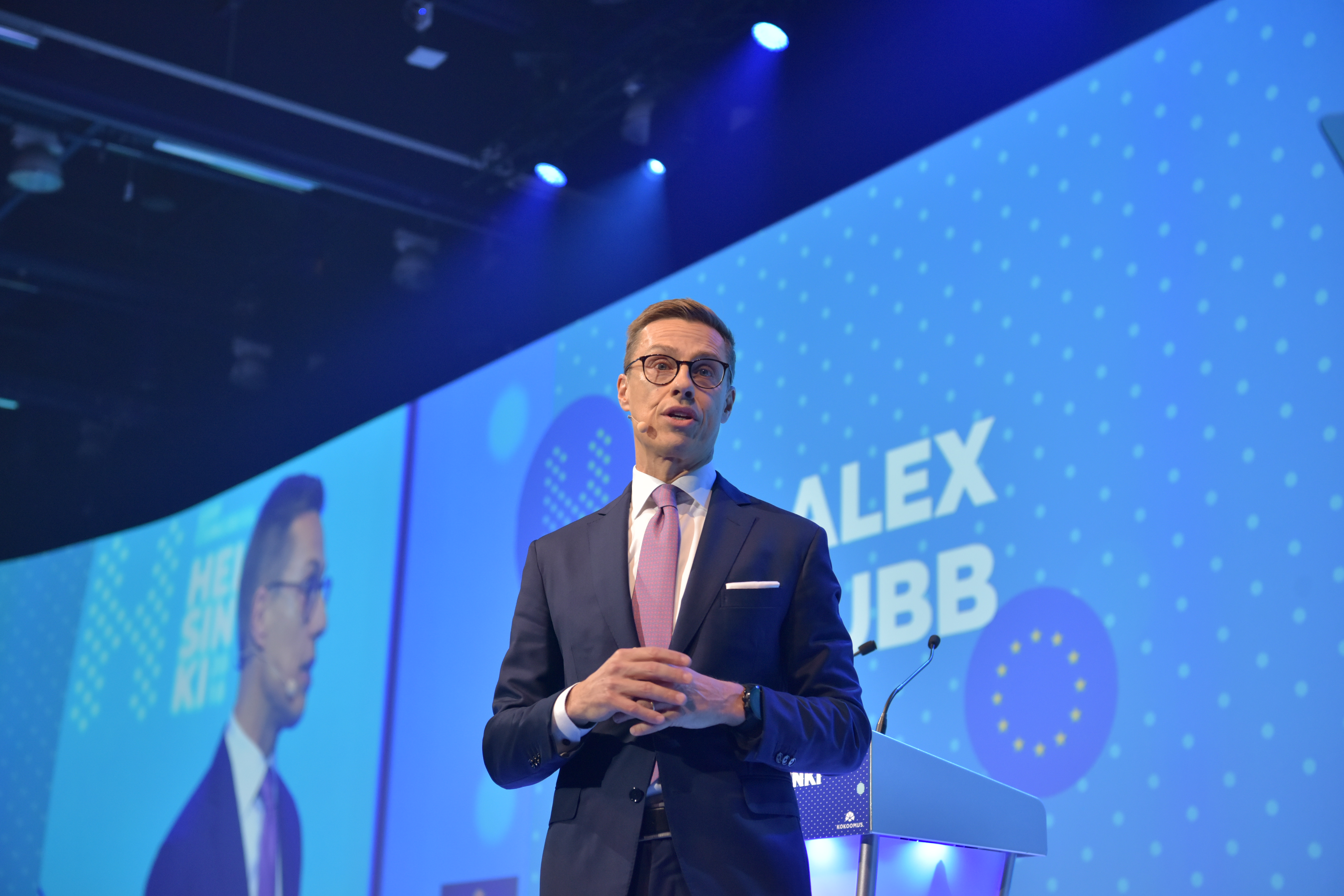
Stubb in EPP Helsinki Congress in 2018

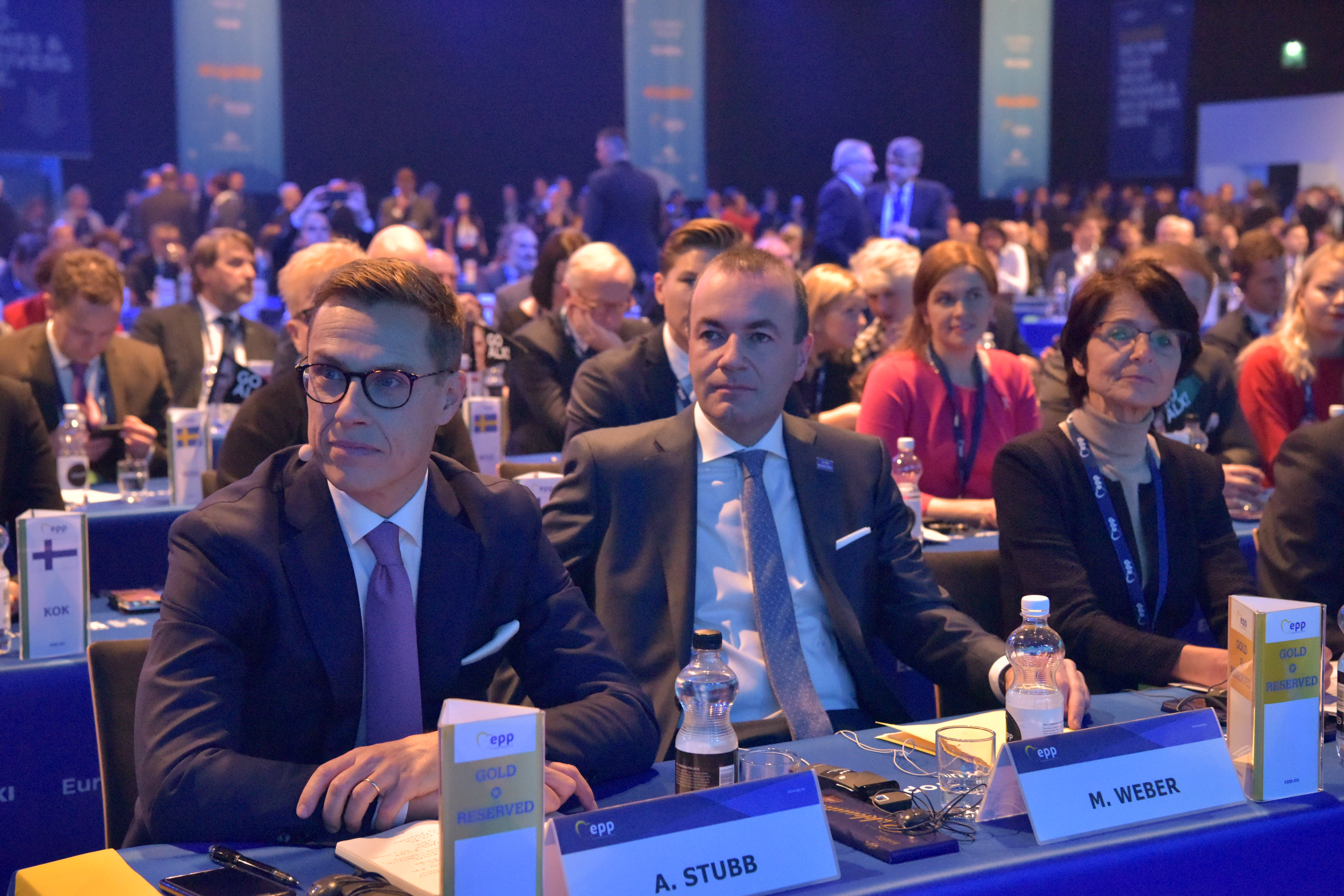
Alexander Stubb and Manfred Weber in 2018

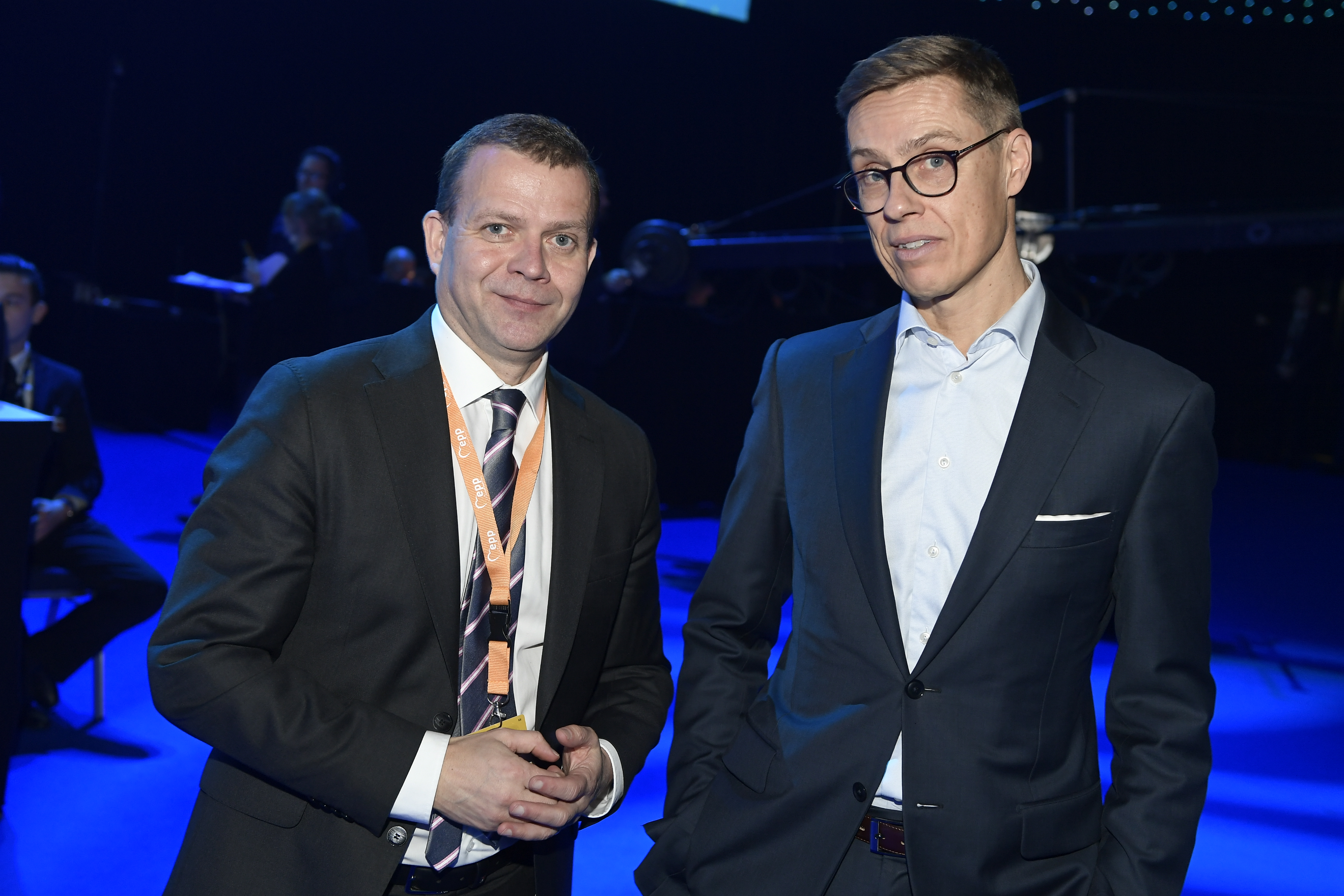
Stubb with Petteri Orpo in 2019

=== 2024 Finnish presidential election ===
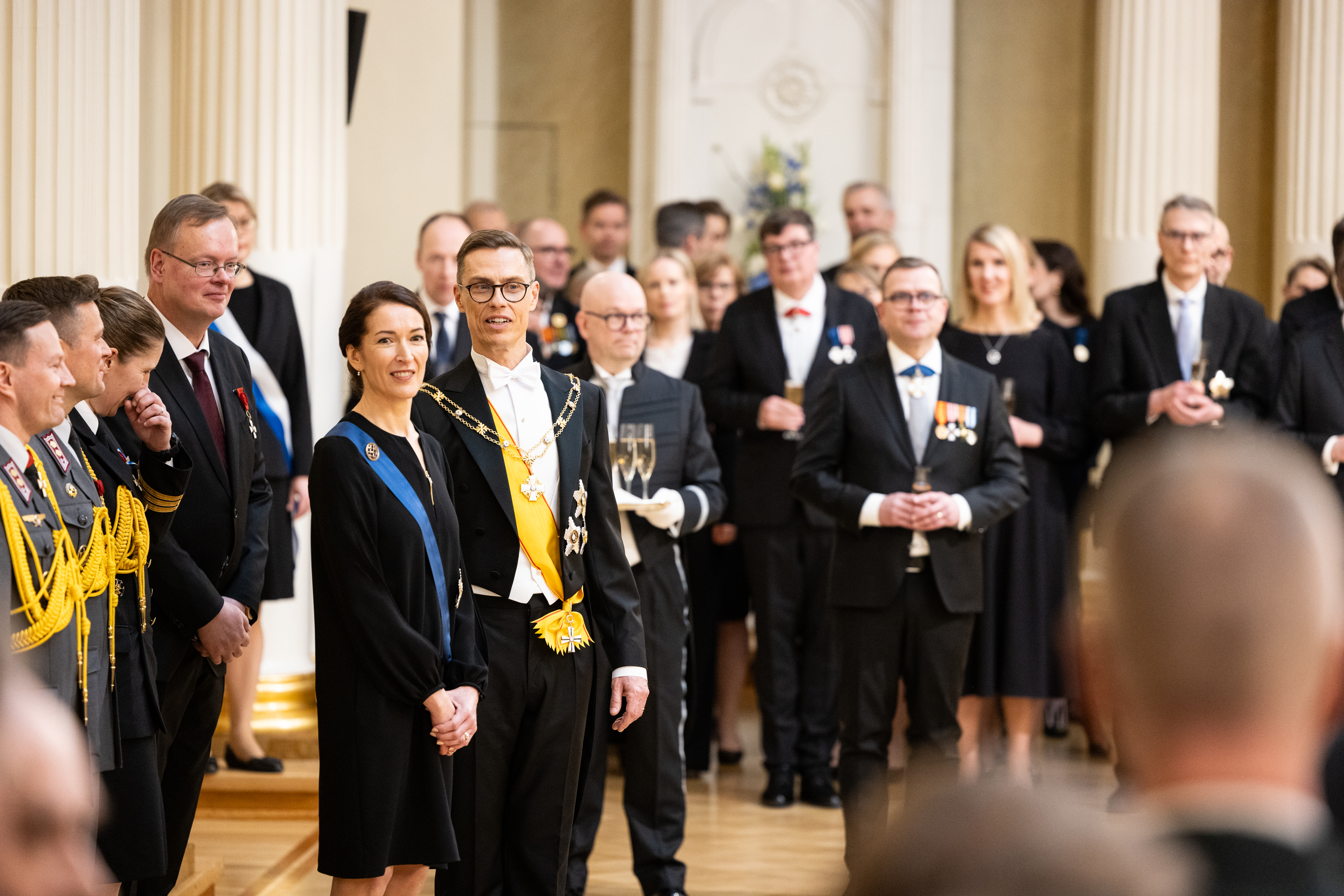
Presidential inauguration

Ahead of the Finnish presidential election in January 2024, Stubb was constantly among the names that were mentioned as the National Coalition Party's presidential candidate. When asked about the topic, Stubb replied that he had promised to seriously consider candidacy if the party asked him to be their candidate. On 14 August 2023, the board of the National Coalition Party decided to formally request Stubb to be the presidential candidate. On 16 August 2023, Stubb announced that he would accept National Coalition Party's candidacy in the presidential election.

With 27.21% of the total vote count, Stubb gained the most votes in the first round of voting and faced the former Minister for Foreign Affairs Pekka Haavisto in the second round. Stubb won the second round with 51.4% of the votes.

=== Presidency (2024–present) ===
Alexander Stubb in Rovaniemi

Stubb succeeded Sauli Niinistö as President of Finland on 1 March 2024 when he was sworn in before Finland's parliament. Stubb is the first President from the Swedish-speaking minority since Carl Gustaf Emil Mannerheim, who ruled the country from 1944 to 1946.

In September 2024, Stubb said that Finland was not ready to recognize a Palestinian state. He defended Finland's decision to buy a missile defense system called David's Sling from Israel despite the ongoing Gaza war. In May 2025, he called on Israel to lift the blockade and allow humanitarian aid to enter Gaza.

In October 2025, Stubb swore in an interview with the BBC that "Finland will never recognize the Crimean peninsula or the Donetsk and Luhansk regions as part of Russia."

In July 2025, Stubb confirmed the decision for Finland to withdraw from the Ottawa Treaty after the Finnish Parliament had voted in favor of it by a vote of 157–18 in June. That same month, Stubb voiced support for secondary sanctions against Russia that would impose 500% tariffs on countries that buy Russian oil, natural gas, uranium and other exports.

On 1 March 2026, Stubb condemned Iran's retaliatory strikes against regional countries as "unjustifiable and indiscriminate." His statement came in the aftermath of a joint U.S.–Israeli military operation targeting Iran.

In April 2026, Alexander Stubb made a two-day visit to Canada, joining Canadian Prime Minister Mark Carney for an ice hockey game at Ottawa. The visit aimed to deepen cooperation between Finland and Canada in the areas of trade, defense, technology, energy, and Arctic policy.

In October 2026 Stubb and the Prime Minister of Norway Jonas Gahr Støre had a telephone conversation with Vladimir Putin. The topics of discussion were the arrangements for negotiations between Ukraine, Russia and the United States. The negotiations are tentatively planned to be held next month at Abu Dhabi.

==== Relationship with President Donald Trump ====
With the start of Donald Trump's presidency, Stubb started to establish a good personal relationship with President Trump, leveraging "golf diplomacy" and direct access to position Finland as a key interlocutor between Washington and Brussels. This started with an unofficial visit to Mar-a-Lago in March 2025, where the two leaders discussed global security issues, such as the war in Ukraine while playing golf and having a lunch. Reuters reported that Stubb had hopes of leveraging Finland's icebreaker building for diplomacy.

In August 2025, Stubb took part in the multilateral White House meeting on Ukraine alongside powerful European leaders raising international attention. In October 2025, Stubb and Donald Trump signed a memorandum of understanding about "icebreaker cooperation". Sources such as Fox News and the BBC news have reported on the deal and developments since the visit to Mar-a-Lago in March 2025 as an unlikely friendship. Further, Stubb played central role in negotiations in late 2025, acting as a primary point of contact for the White House in Europe, relaying European concerns about peace deal proposed by the Russian side resolving the Russo-Ukrainian war.

Jason Moyer, an expert on transatlantic relationships, stated to the BBC he believes that the newfound influence, which he described as outsized, in Washington can be attributed to a personal relationship with Trump as well as continued support for Ukraine and expertise with the arctic environment and Russia. Multiple international experts, such as Keir Giles, have also praised the relationship and diplomacy with Trump as exceptional and skillful. They also joined Moyer in describing the influence of Finland as having been strengthened. Some international correspondents, however, warned that relationships with Trump come and go.

In April 2026 Politico continued to report on Stubb as a trusted confidante to Trump in Europe. However, in June 2026 Stubb stated, according to Finnish newspaper Iltalehti, to Politico in an interview that the conflicts in Greenland, Venezuela, and Iran had somewhat changed Trump's approach to allies.

==== Overseas visits ====
The same day he was sworn in, King Carl XVI Gustaf invited Stubb to visit Sweden in April. On 7 March 2024, Stubb made his first foreign trip as Finland's new president to NATO's Nordic Response military exercise in northern Norway. In July, he attended the 2024 Washington summit, Finland's second NATO summit as a member of the alliance and the first during his presidency.

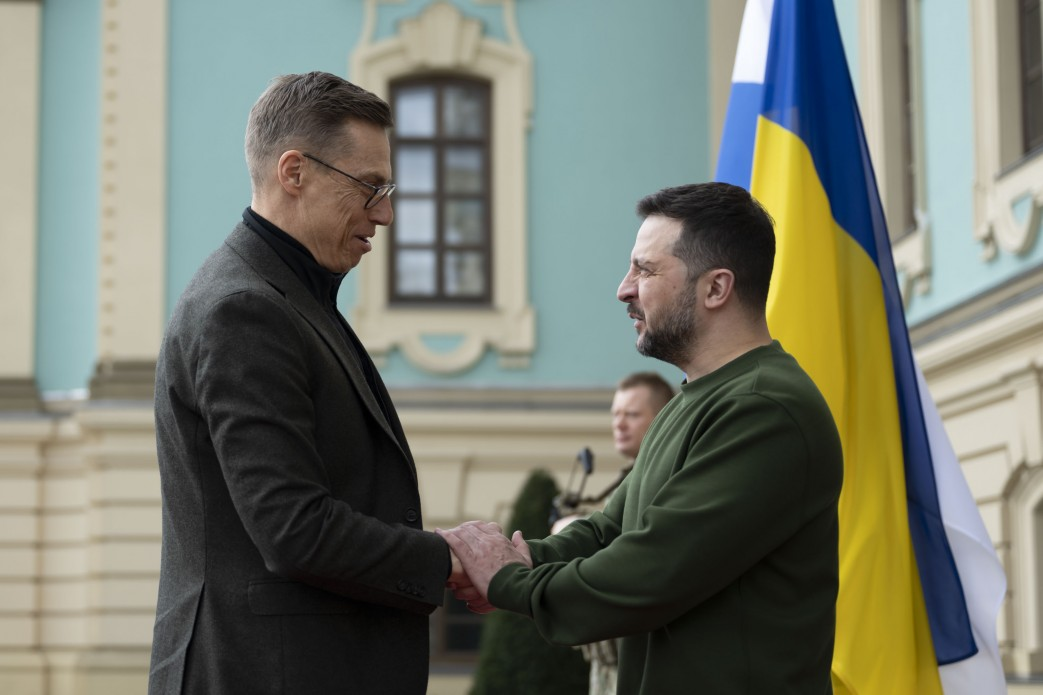
Stubb with President of Ukraine Volodymyr Zelenskyy in 2024

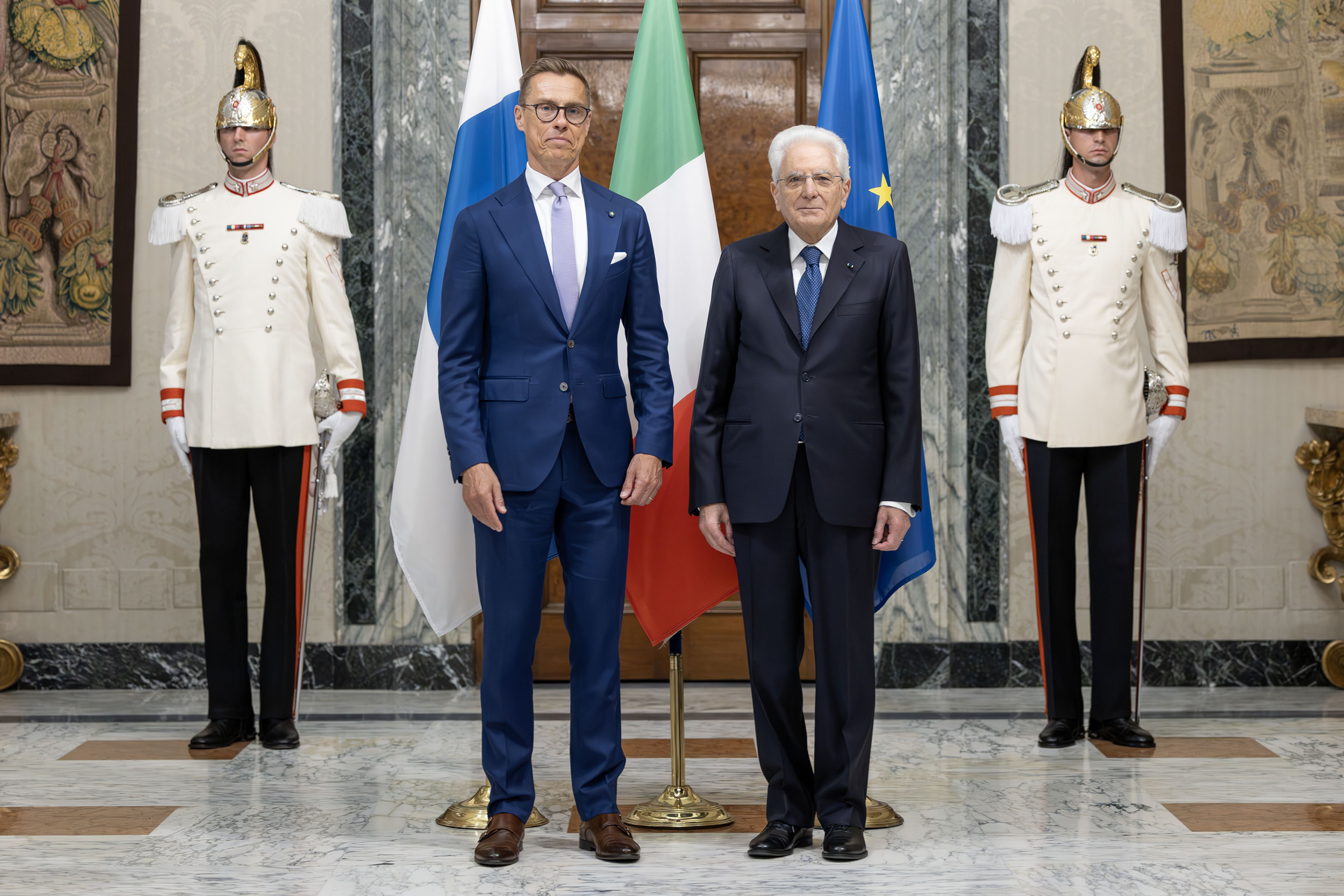
Stubb with President of Italy Sergio Mattarella in 2024

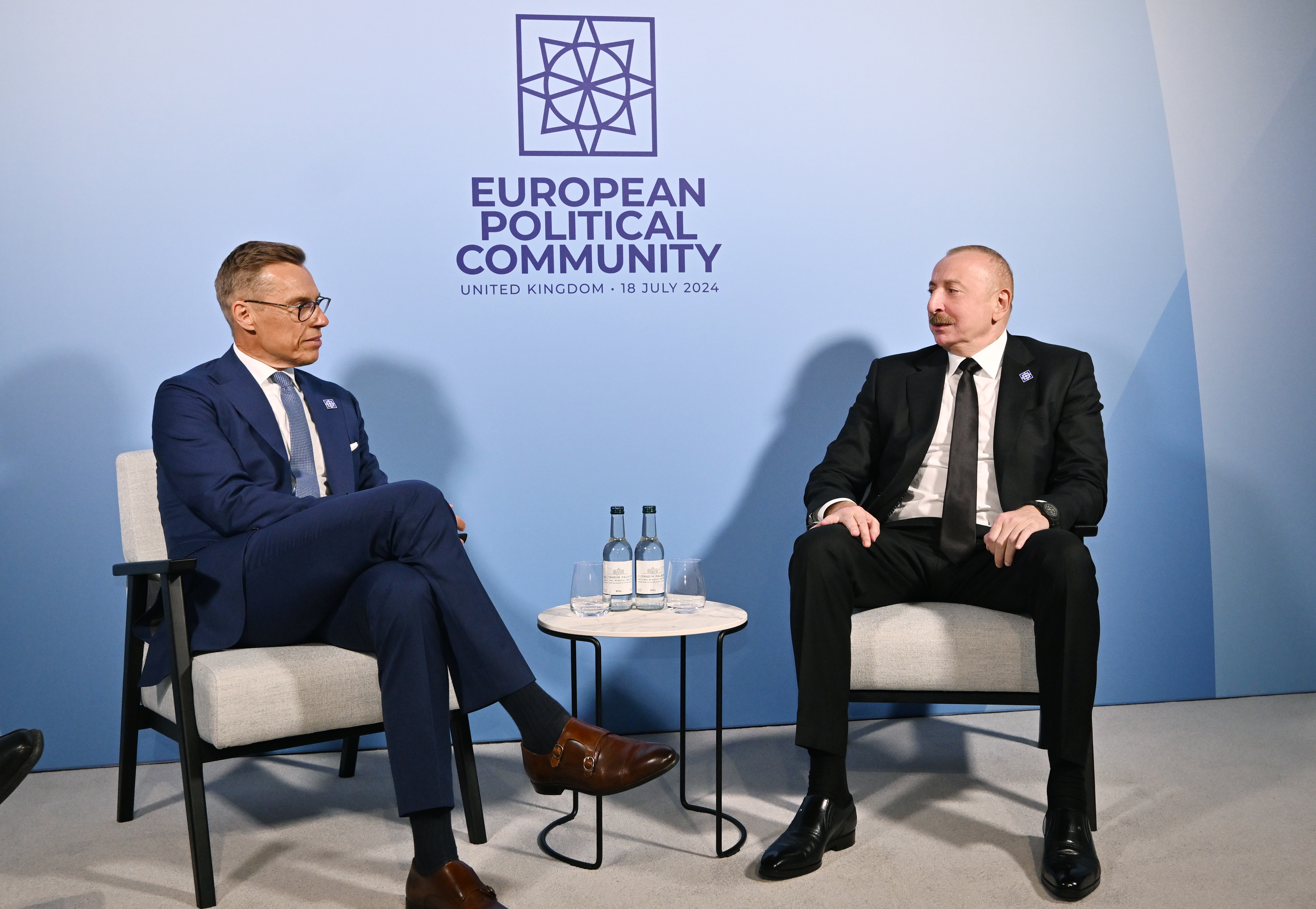
Stubb with Azerbaijani President Ilham Aliyev in 2024

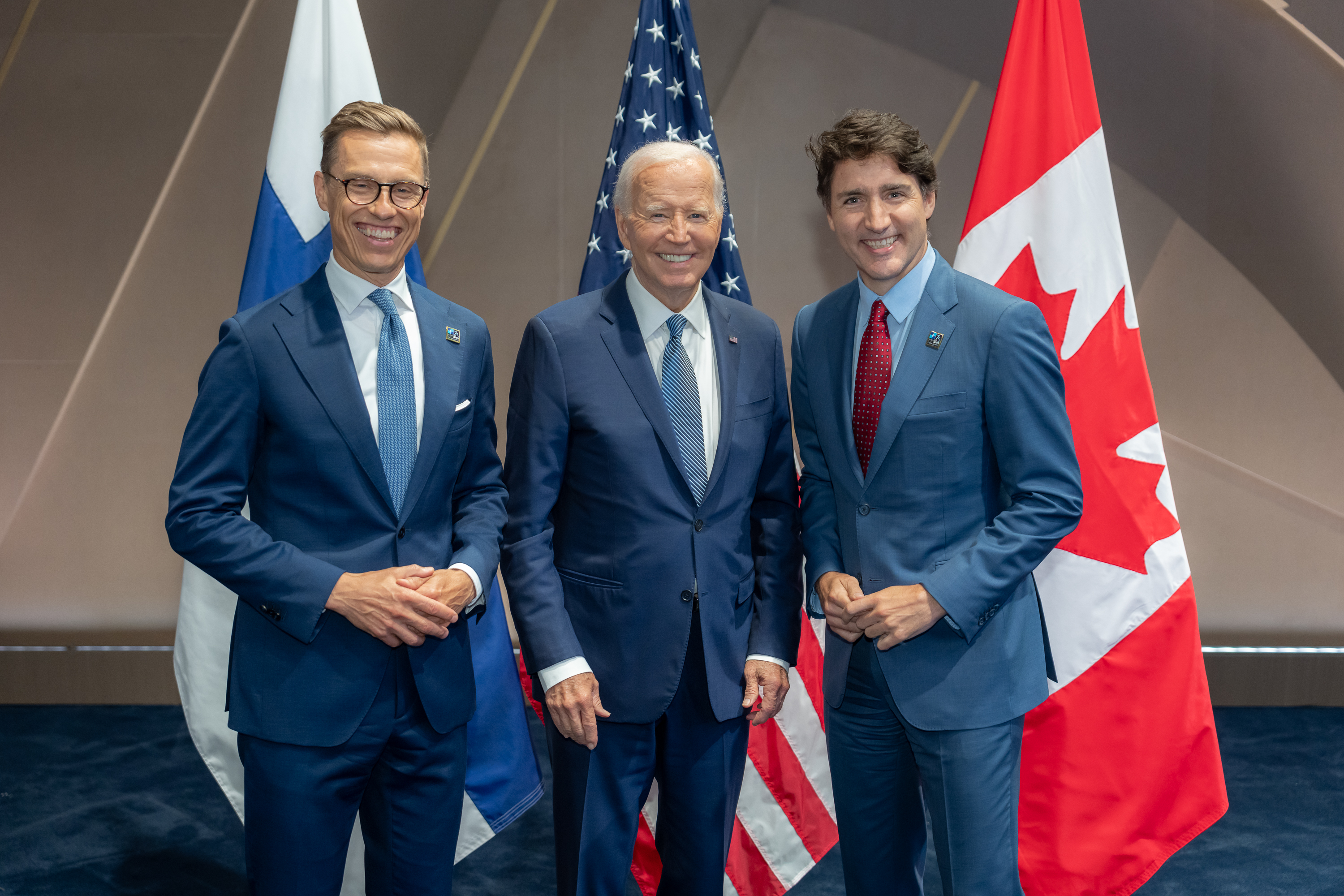
Stubb meets with U.S. President Joe Biden and Canadian Prime Minister Justin Trudeau in Washington, D.C. in 2024

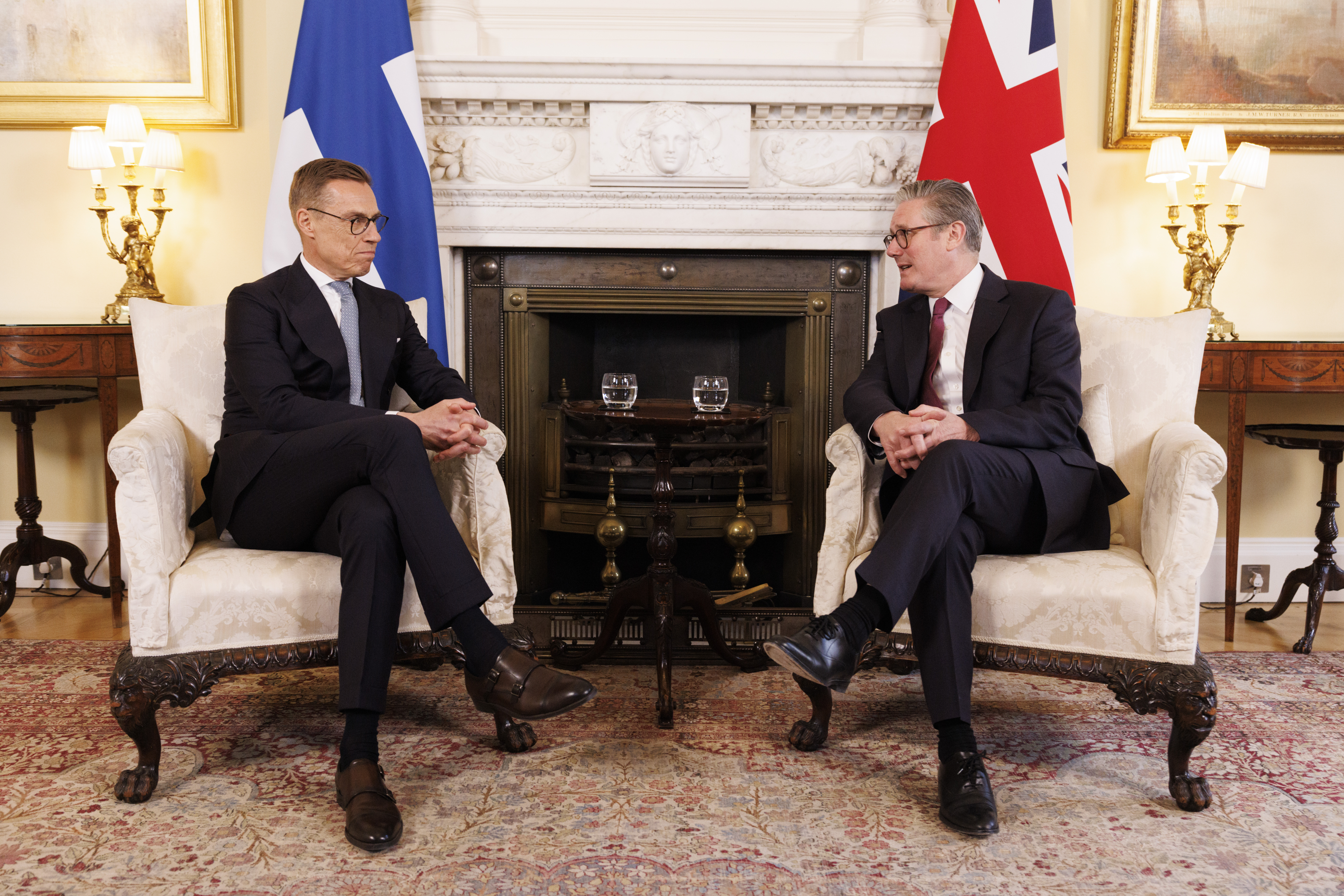
Stubb with British Prime Minister Keir Starmer in 2025

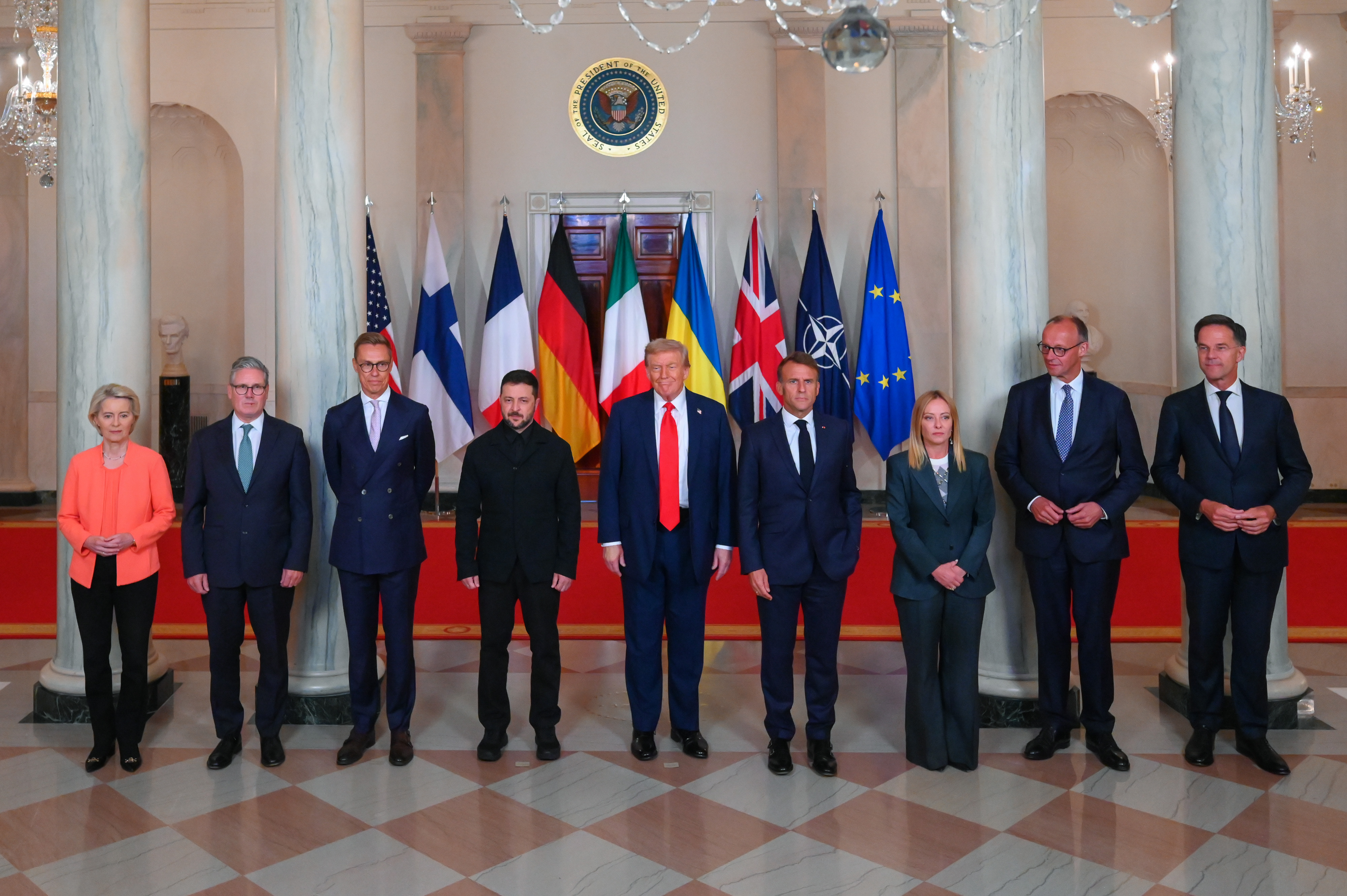
Stubb with European leaders, Ukrainian President Volodymyr Zelenskyy and U.S. President Donald Trump in Washington, D.C. in 2025

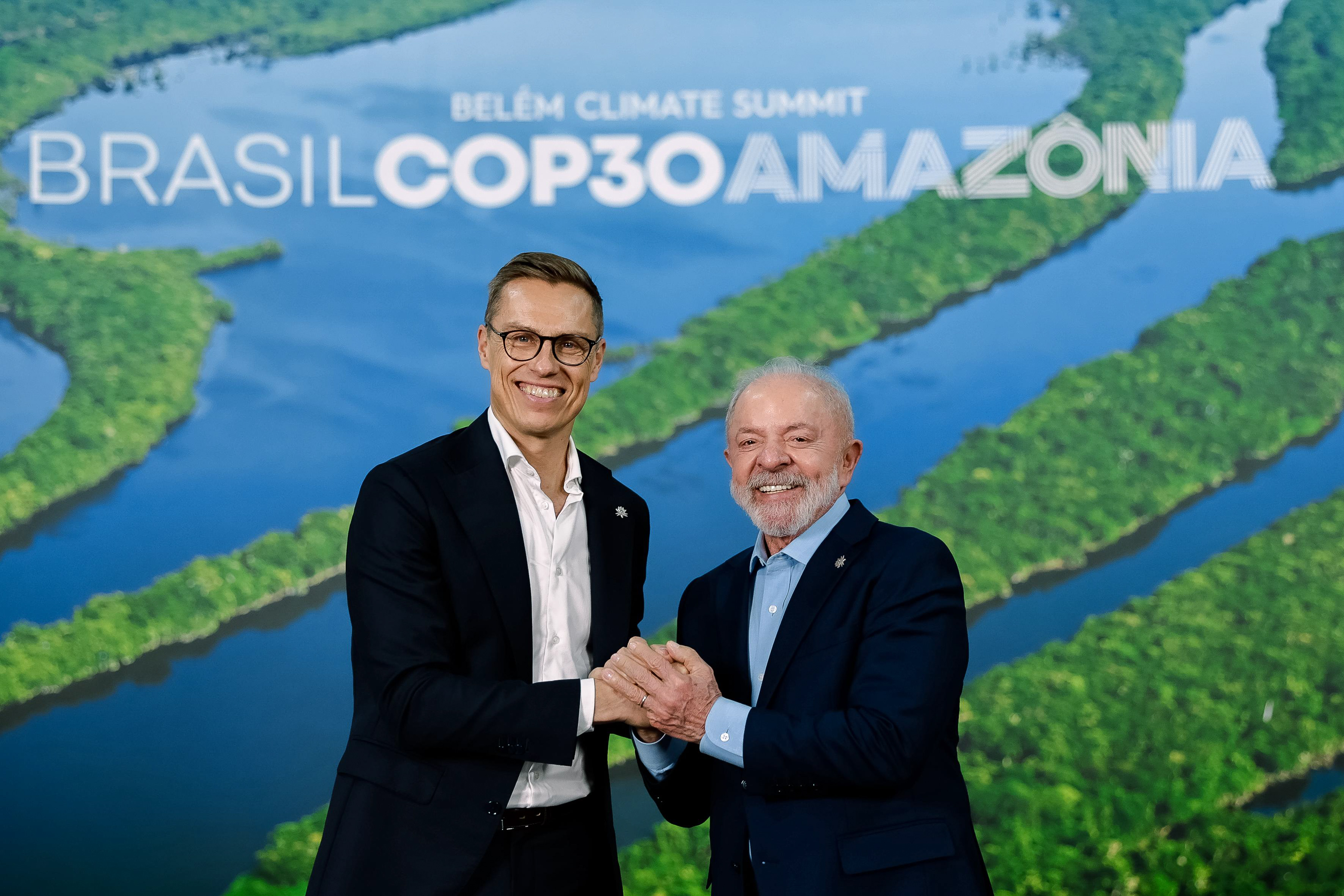
Stubb with President of Brazil Luiz Inácio Lula da Silva in 2025

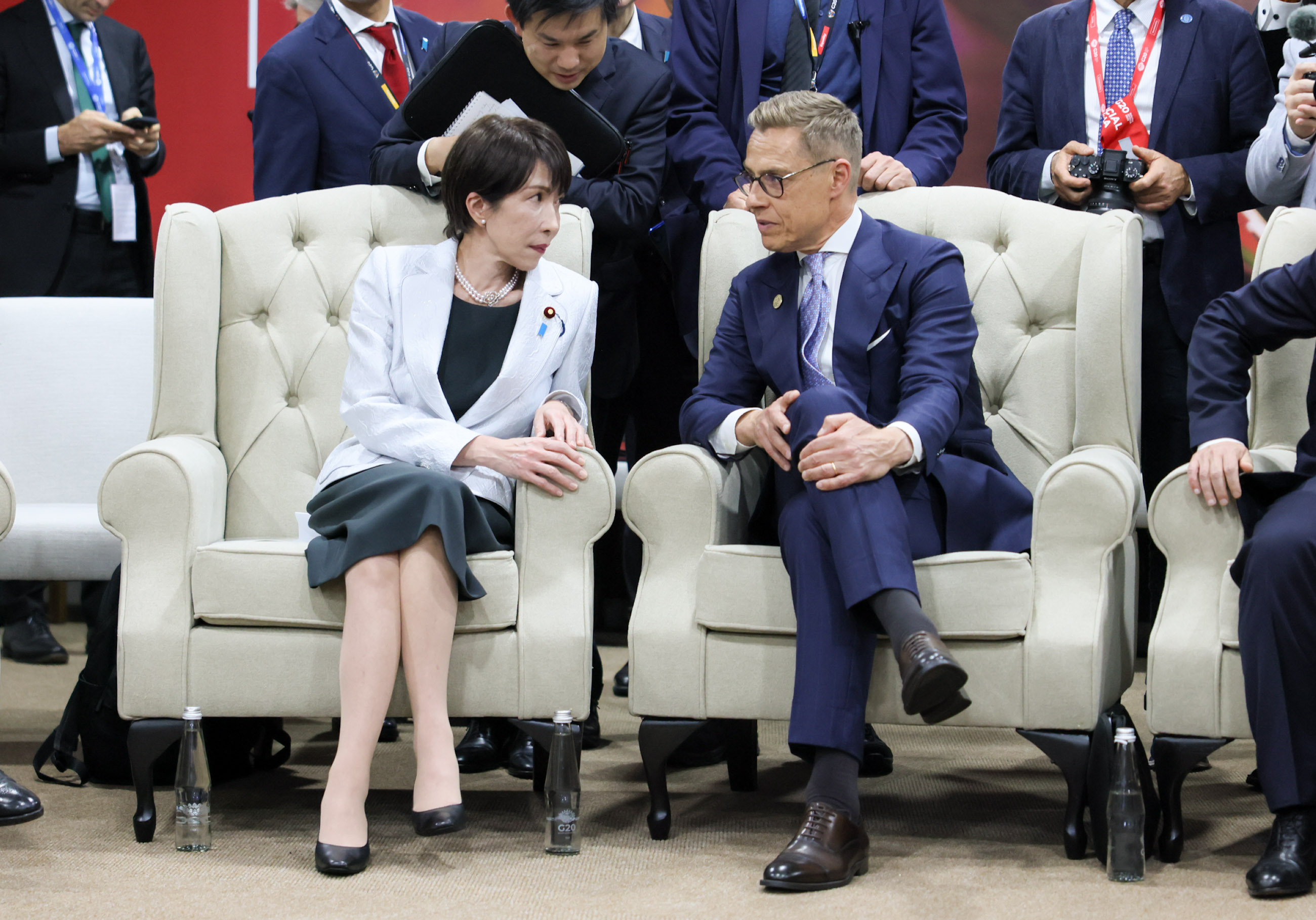
Stubb with Prime Minister of Japan Sanae Takaichi in 2025

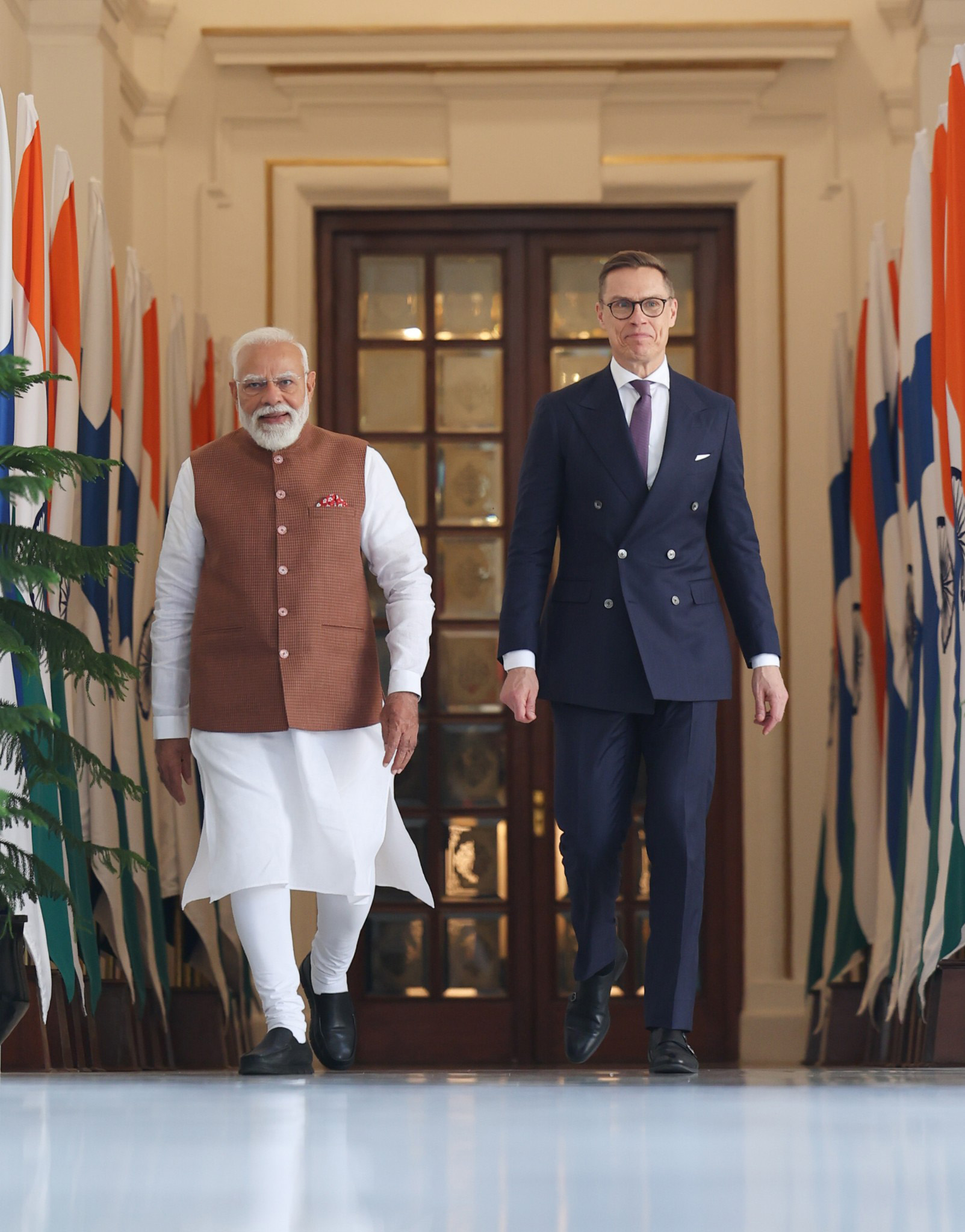
Stubb with Prime Minister of India Narendra Modi in 2026

== Political views ==
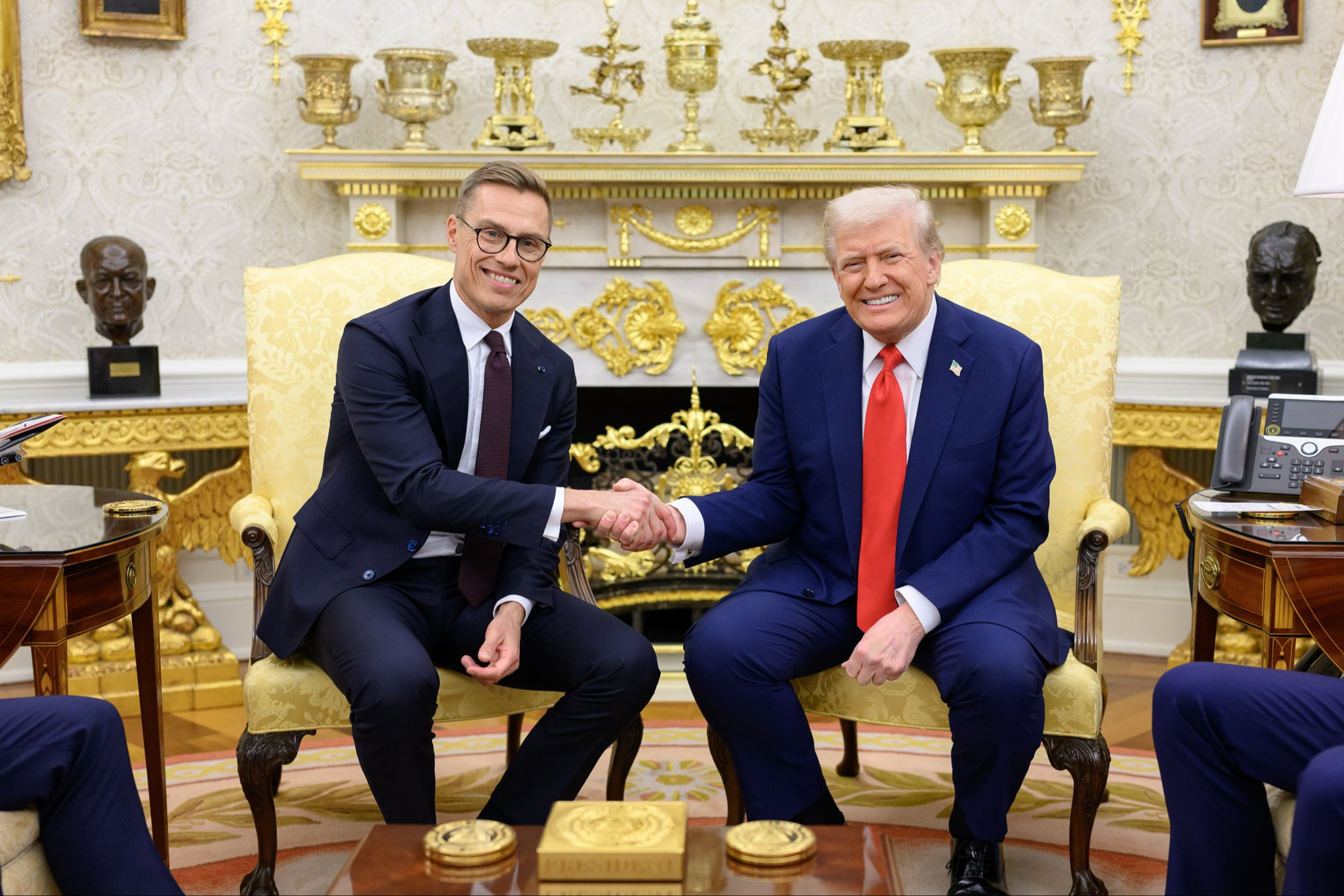
Stubb has emphasized strong relations with the United States throughout his career. Stubb with U.S. President Donald Trump at the White House in 2025.

Stubb is a proponent of deepening European integration. When he was the Minister for Foreign Affairs in 2008, Stubb gave a speech in which he argued in favour of the EU taking an active role in international politics. He noted that while the EU is the world's largest economy, it is not a superpower but a regional soft power. When running for party leadership in 2014, he described himself as an "academic federalist", although "in practice a functionalist" with regard to the EU. Stubb, for example, opposes eurobonds. He also insisted that he is no longer the "pure federalist" that he used to be when he was a researcher. Stubb expressed his support for Turkey's EU membership in 2010. He warned that Brexit could pose a "Lehman Brothers moment" that could lead to the collapse of the EU. Stubb held early on that Finland should apply for membership of NATO. Stubb also firmly opposes Russia's war against Ukraine and has thus tried to strongly influence the US government to offer its support to Ukraine, including by holding close discussions with President Donald Trump. Because of this, Politico has ranked Stubb as one of Europe's most influential figures in 2025.

Stubb is seen as a representative of the National Coalition Party's liberal wing. He has characterised himself as a liberal, as well as a moderate liberal. Stubb wants to bring about a "more positive way of doing politics". He believes everyone should be appreciated and respected even when there are disagreements. He supports same-sex marriage, and has been the patron of Helsinki's gay pride parade. He supports multiculturalism, and believes that increasing immigration to Finland is necessary. Stubb believes that the most important political divide in modern politics is that between the supporters of globalisation (like himself) and opponents of globalisation. During his presidential campaign, he announced that his foreign and security policies would be consensual, and contingent upon existential circumstances. According to Stubb, among the former Finnish presidents, Martti Ahtisaari has been his role model and mentor, while he did not appreciate Urho Kekkonen at all, characterizing the Finland of his childhood as "Kekkoslovakia". (Note: A combination of names Kekkonen and Czechoslovakia)

== Other work ==
An active columnist, Stubb has stated that he has "always been of the opinion that matters must be discussed openly and honestly". Since his professorship at the College of Europe, Stubb has published 16 books, dozens of academic articles, and hundreds of columns. In 2016, Stubb started to write columns for the Financial Times. Stubb maintains a blog. He is also one of the most active Twitter users among European leaders. He has co-authored an e-book in Finnish about what to do on Twitter. Stubb also used TikTok for a while before he was elected as the next president of Finland.

Stubb regularly contributes to the STG channel on YouTube (EUI School of Transnational Governance). His book Alaston totuus ja muita kirjoituksia suomalaisista ja eurooppalaisista – The Naked Truth and Other Stories About Finns and Europeans (ISBN 978-951-0-35175-8), a collection of his columns for the Finnair in-flight magazine Blue Wings, was published in a bilingual Finnish–English edition by WSOY in 2009. Stubb has received the Schwarzkopf Foundation prize.

Stubb also publishes his book The Triangle of Power: Rebalancing the New World Order in January 2026, and before that he also wrote an article for Foreign Affairs displaying the main point of the book. In the article he argues, that the post-Cold War era of a "liberal international order" has ended, replaced by a new era of disorder and competition of multiple poles of the world, but he also advocates a solution by his approach called "values-based realism".

== Personal life ==
=== Relationship in America ===
In the early 1990s, when Stubb went to the United States to study, he met fellow student Kerstin Armstrong (née Reinhold), and they dated at university for three years. Ultimately, differences in their religious beliefs led to them deciding to end the relationship.

=== Family ===
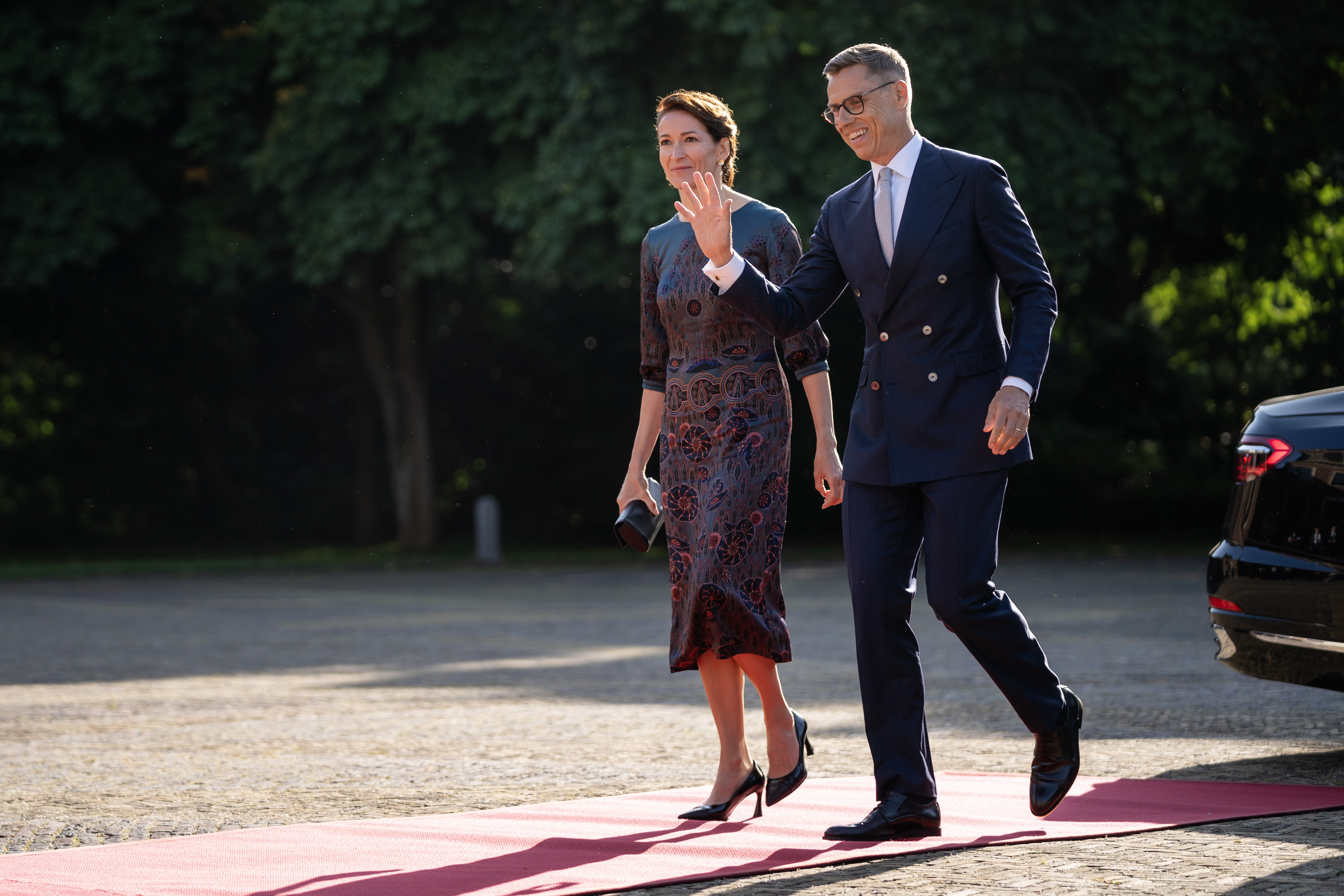
Alexander Stubb and his wife Suzanne Innes-Stubb

Stubb is married to Suzanne Innes-Stubb, a British lawyer whom he met at the College of Europe in Bruges. They have two children (born in 2001 and 2004). She is the first person of overseas origin to become the First Lady of Finland. Stubb resided in Westend, Espoo, before his election as president. He previously owned two cats but one died in 2024. He also owns a cat which he adopted from a rescue organisation in 2016.

Alexander Stubb belongs to the Evangelical Lutheran Church of Finland.

=== Sports enthusiasm ===
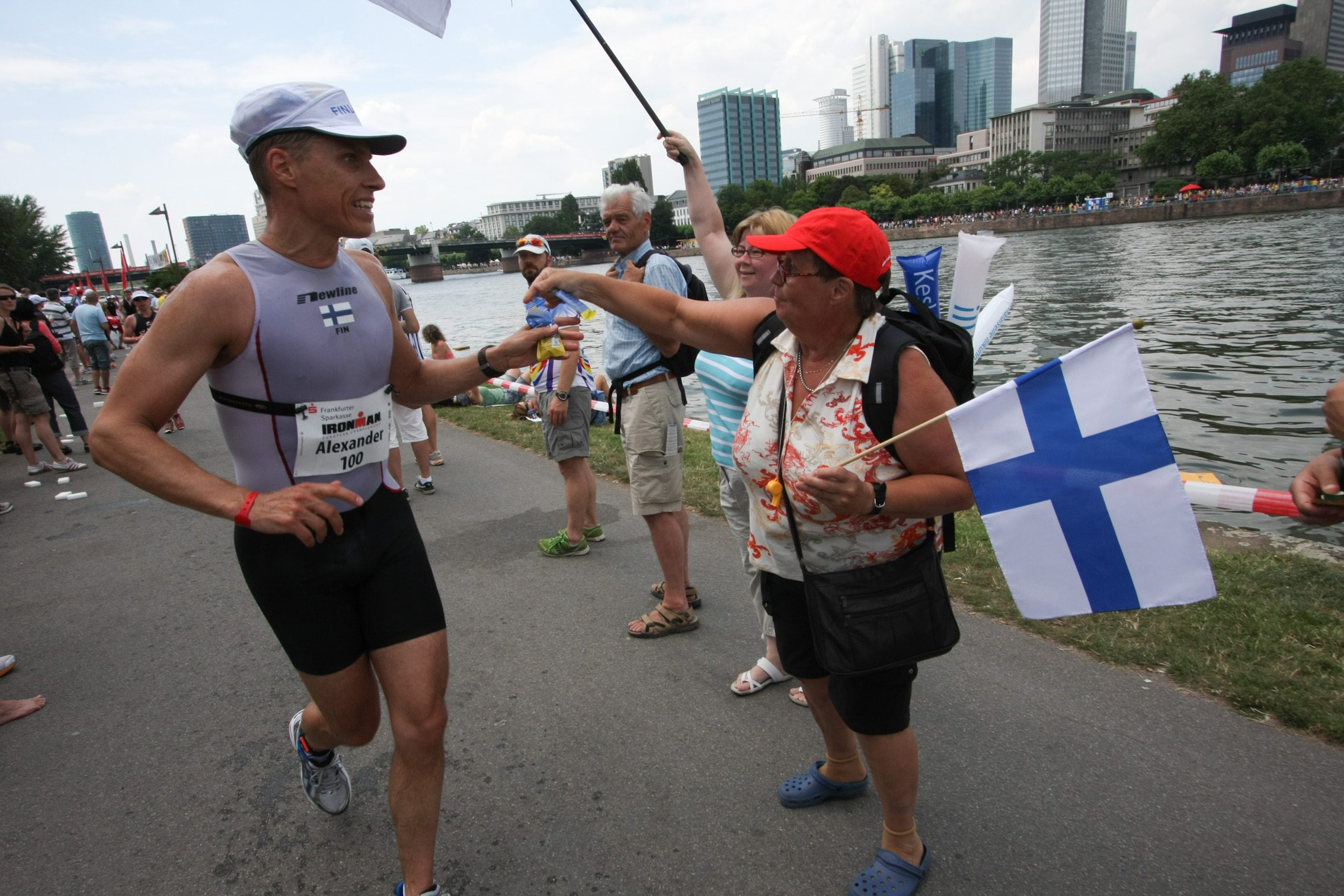
Stubb in Frankfurt 2009

Stubb played ice hockey for HIFK as a youth but stopped playing in the B-juniors. He often attends HIFK's home games, at the Helsinki Ice Hall. After ice hockey, Stubb moved on to golf and became a member of the Helsinki Golf Club in the mid-1980s. He was able to study at Furman University in the United States on a partial golf scholarship in the late 1980s.

Stubb regularly competes in marathons and triathlons and has finished Ironman Triathlons. In the 2012 Frankfurt Ironman, he competed with "Iron Birds Finland", a team of 18 people competing to support leukemia research. In the 2013 Ironman Sweden (in Kalmar), His time was 9:55'47. He ran his best marathon time, 3:08:13, in the 2015 Frankfurt Marathon. In July 2025, Stubb participated in the Triathlon competition held in Joroinen, Finland under the pseudonym "A.S.", placing in 2nd place.

In the winter, Alexander Stubb uses ice swimming as a stress management tool. He has shared several photos of his swimming trips on social media, and has been practicing the hobby in places like Munkkiniemi in Helsinki.

=== Languages ===
Stubb is a polyglot. He speaks and understands both Finnish and Swedish natively, and speaks fluent English and French, and to a lesser extent German. In 2020 it was reported that he was studying Italian.

== Electoral history ==
=== Finnish presidential election ===
Year	Votes	Percentage	Result
2024	882,113	27.21%	Advanced to second round
2024	1,575,444	51.62%	Elected

=== European Parliament elections ===
Year	Constituency	Votes	Percentage	Result
2004	Finland, European Union	115,224	6.96%	Elected
2014	Finland, European Union	148,190	8.57%	Elected

=== Finland Parliamentary elections ===
Year	Constituency	Votes	Percentage	Result
2011	Uusimaa, Finland	41,768	8.24%	Elected
2015	Uusimaa, Finland	27,129	5.22%	Elected

== Honours ==
=== National honours ===
- Finland: Commander of the Order of the White Rose of Finland (6 December 2010)
- Finland: Cross of Merit for War Invalids (27 April 2015)
- Finland: Grand Master and Commander Grand Cross with Collar of the Order of the White Rose of Finland (1 March 2024) ex officio as President of the Republic
- Finland: Grand Master and Commander Grand Cross of the Order of the Lion of Finland (1 March 2024) ex officio as President of the Republic
- Finland: Grand Master and Commander Grand Cross of the Order of the Cross of Liberty (1 March 2024) ex officio as President of the Republic
- Finland: Cross of Merit of the Tammenlehvä Heritage Association (3 November 2025)

=== Foreign honours ===
- Denmark: Knight of the Order of the Elephant (4 March 2025)
- Estonia:
  - Collar of the Order of the Cross of Terra Mariana (23 May 2024)
  - First Class of the Order of the Cross of Terra Mariana (9 May 2014)
- France: Officer of the Order of Legion of Honour (1 June 2018)
- Iceland: Grand Cross with Collar of the Order of the Falcon (7 October 2025)
- Italy: Knight Grand Cross of the Order of Merit of the Italian Republic (5 September 2008)
- Latvia: Commander Grand Cross with Chain of the Order of the Three Stars (16 September 2025)
- Lithuania: Grand Cross with Golden Chain of the Order of Vytautas the Great (14 May 2026)
- Luxembourg: Knight of the Order of the Gold Lion of the House of Nassau (29 September 2026)
- Netherlands: Knight Grand Cross of the Order of the Lion of the Netherlands (11 December 2025)
- Norway:
  - Knight Grand Cross of the Order of Saint Olav (15 October 2024)
  - Knight Grand Cross of the Royal Norwegian Order of Merit (10 October 2012)
- Spain: Collar of the Order of Isabella the Catholic (30 September 2026)
- Sweden: Knight of the Royal Order of the Seraphim (23 April 2024)
- Ukraine:
  - Order of Liberty (24 August 2026)
  - Order of Prince Yaroslav the Wise, 1st class (11 September 2025)

=== Other honours ===
- Germany:
  - Walther-Rathenau-Preis – Walther Rathenau Institut (November 2026)
- United States:
  - Global Citizen Awards – Atlantic Council (September 2026)
  - Leadership Award – Freedom House (May 2026)

=== Honorary doctorates ===
- Finland: Honorary Doctor of Business Sciences – LUT University (June 2012)
- United States: Honorary Doctor of Philosophy – Furman University (6 May 2017)
- Finland: Honorary Doctor of Arts – University of the Arts Helsinki (17 August 2024)
- Finland: Honorary Doctor of Philosophy – University of Vaasa (29 April 2025)
- Finland: Honorary Doctor of Business Administration – Aalto University (22 May 2026)
- Finland: Honorary Doctor of sports sciences – University of Jyväskylä (23 May 2026)

== Cabinets ==
- Stubb Cabinet

== See also ==
- List of presidents of Finland

== Notes ==
Political offices
Preceded by Ilkka Kanerva	Minister for Foreign Affairs; 2008–2011	Succeeded by Erkki Tuomioja
Preceded by Astrid Thors	Minister for European Affairs and Trade; 2011–2014	Succeeded by Lenita Toivakka
Preceded by Jyrki Katainen	Prime Minister of Finland; 2014–2015	Succeeded by Juha Sipilä
Preceded by Antti Rinne	Minister of Finance; 2015–2016	Succeeded by Petteri Orpo
Preceded by Sauli Niinistö	President of Finland; 2024–present	Incumbent
Party political offices
Preceded by Jyrki Katainen	Leader of the National Coalition Party; 2014–2016	Succeeded by Petteri Orpo
Academic offices
Preceded by Mariano Rajoy	Invocation Speaker of the College of Europe; 2015	Succeeded by Jean-Claude Juncker
