= Kai Setälä =

Finnish physician and professor (1913–2005)

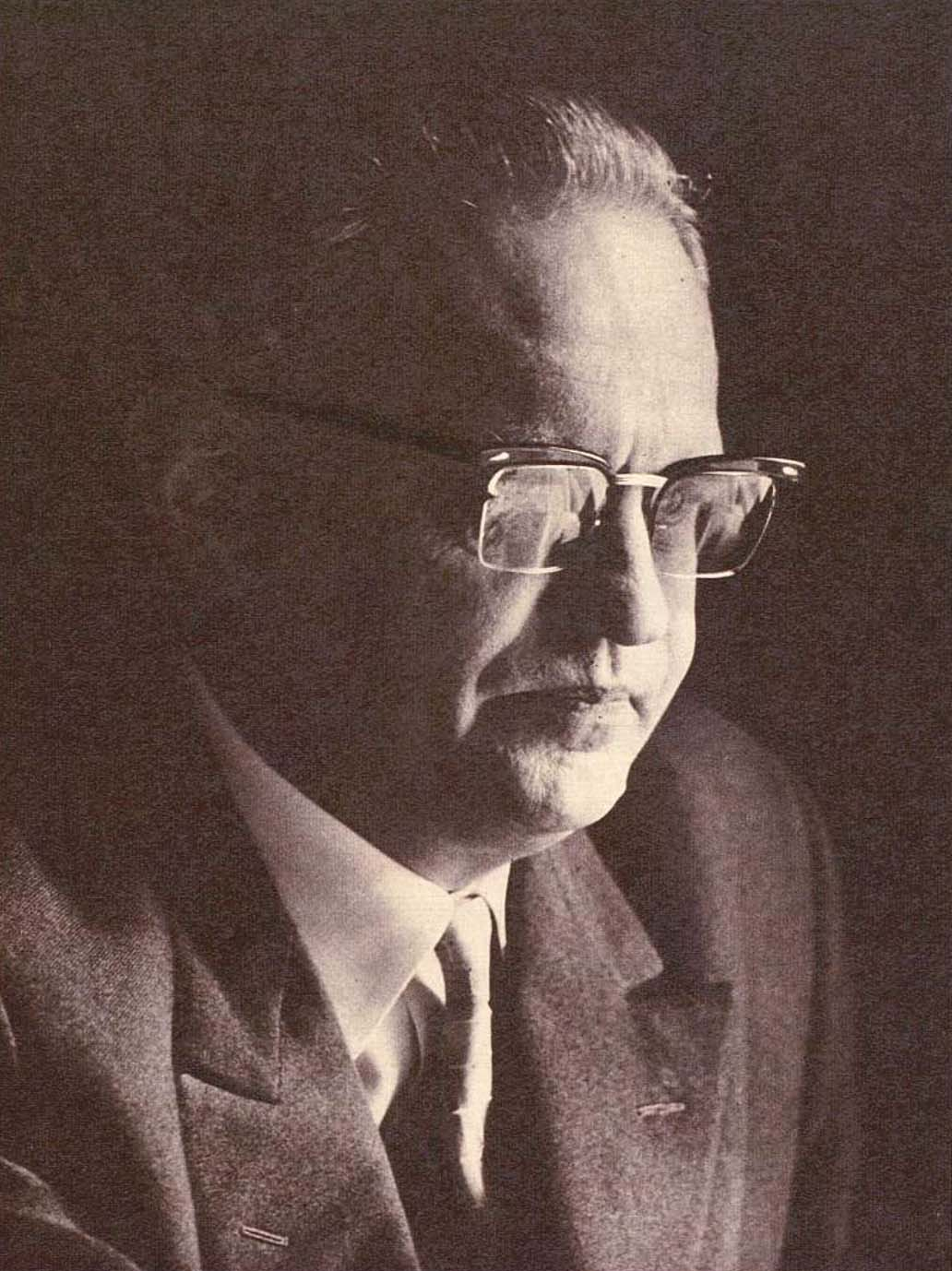
- Setälä in 1962
- Born: Kai Martin Edvard Setälä; 13 September 1913; Pori, Finland
- Died: 12 May 2005 (aged 91); Helsinki, Finland
- Spouse: Inger Ekman (m. 1942; died 1986)
- Children: 3; including Christel Stubb
- Parent(s): Emil Setälä; Helmi Snellman
- Relatives: Erkki Setälä (brother); Eemil Nestor Setälä (great-uncle); Alexander Stubb (grandson)

Academic background
- Education: University of Helsinki

Academic work
- Main interests: Anatomical pathology

Kai Martin Edvard Setälä (13 September 1913, Pori – 12 May 2005, Helsinki) was a Finnish physician and professor of pathological anatomy at the University of Helsinki. Through his daughter Christel, he was the maternal grandfather of Alexander Stubb, the 13th president of Finland. Setälä himself was the great-nephew of professor E. N. Setälä (1864–1935), the Counsellor of State, the Chairman of the Senate of Finland and co-author of the Finnish Declaration of Independence.

== Life ==
Setälä's parents were pharmacist Emil Eino Fredrik Setälä (1888–1963) and Helmi Emilia Snellman (1889–1952). Setälä graduated from Nurmes joint school in 1933 and graduated with a medical degree in 1941, when he also defended his doctorate in medicine and surgery. In 1942, he married Inger Maria Torsdotter Ekman (1922–1986). He received his qualification as a specialist in x-ray examination and treatment in 1946 and his specialist qualification in radiation therapy for cancer diseases in 1949. Setälä was a docent of radiotherapy at the University of Helsinki from 1948 to 1953, when he became a professor. Before that, he had worked for both the university and several different hospitals. Setälä held numerous positions of trust at home and abroad, he was, among other things, a founding member and vice-chairman of the Cancer Foundation at the end of the 1940s.

In the 1960s, Setälä launched a product called Antiscal for the treatment of baldness.

== Sources ==
=== Further reading ===
- Oksa, Anna-Marja; Kirpilä, Juhani; Motti, Sisko (1963). Suomen lääkärit 1962 (in Finnish). Helsinki: Suomen Lääkäriliitto.
