= Independence Day Reception =

Annual event on the Independence Day of Finland

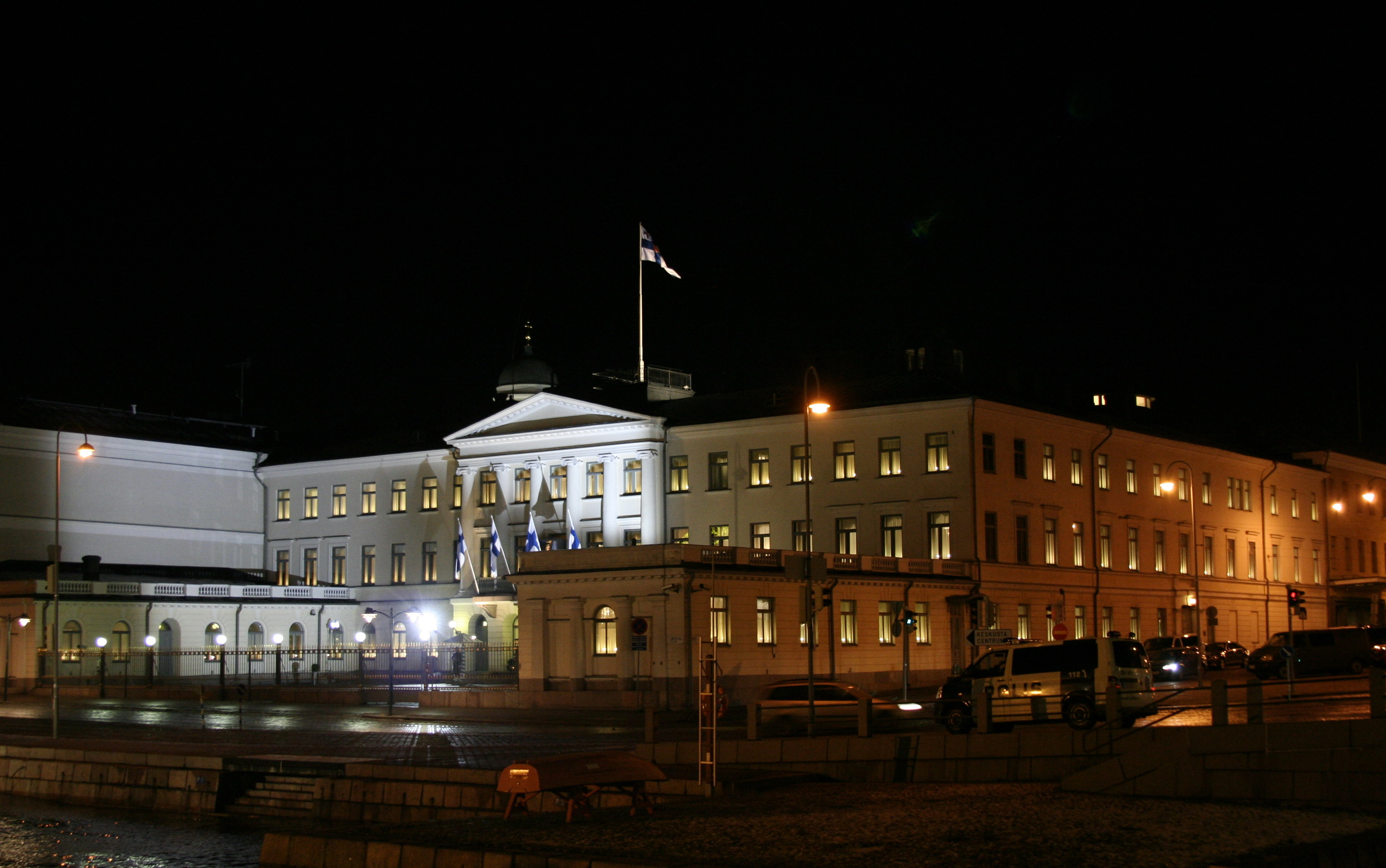
Presidential palace on the Independence Day 2011.

The Independence Day Reception (Finnish: Itsenäisyyspäivän vastaanotto; Swedish: Självständighetsdagens festmottagning) is an annual event organised by the President of Finland at the Presidential Palace in Helsinki on 6 December, Finland's Independence Day. Invitations are sent to all members of parliament and other representatives of the national and municipal governments, the ambassadors to Finland, representatives of NGOs, important business people, and people who distinguished themselves during the year in the arts, sports, sciences, and other fields.

== History ==
=== Growing tradition ===
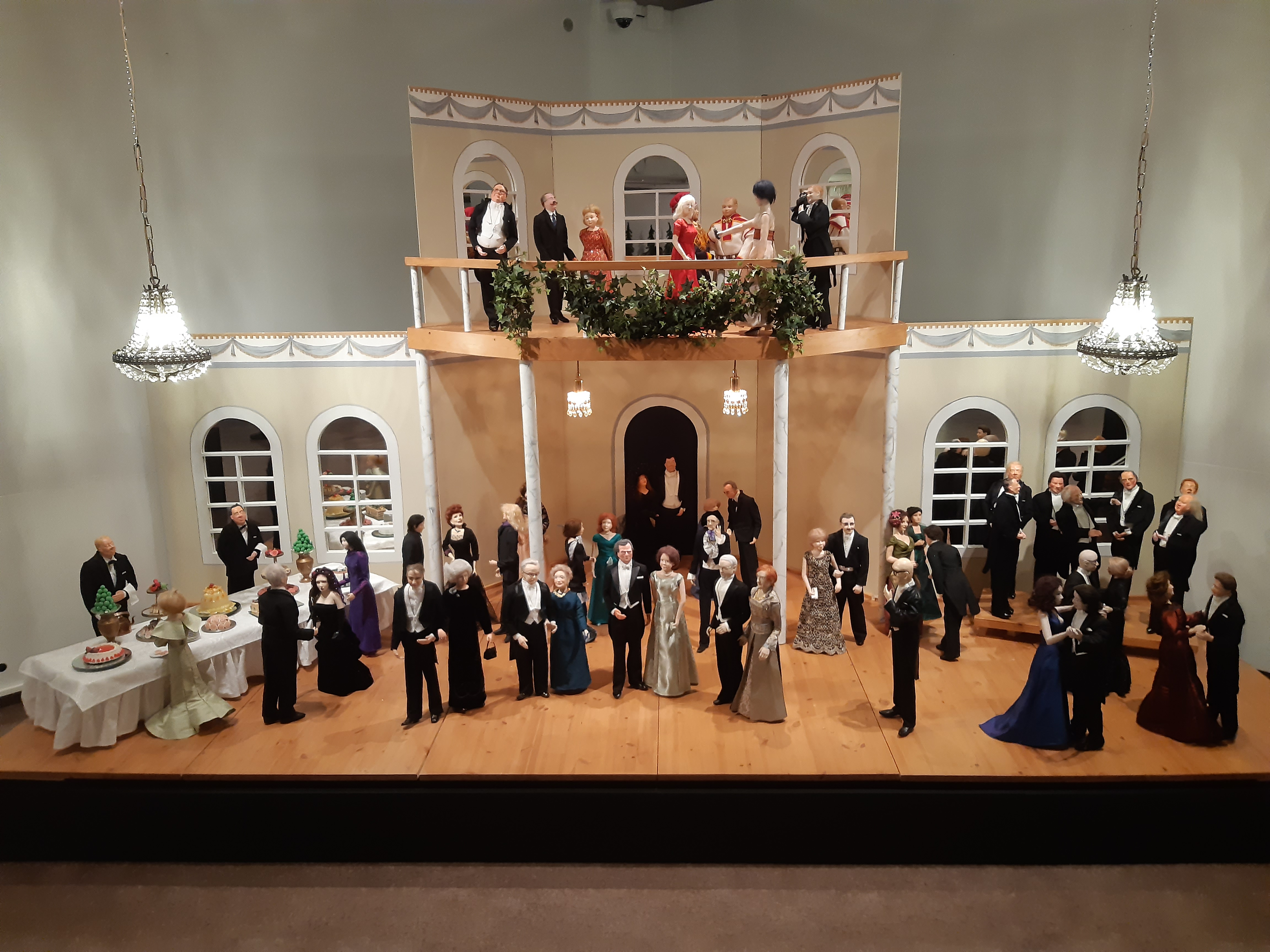
Dollhouse of Independence Day Reception

The tradition of Independence Day Receptions began after Finnish Independence in 1919. The first, an afternoon reception, was hosted by president K. J. Ståhlberg and his daughter Aino Ståhlberg. The reception had approximately 150 guests and lasted for an hour. Guests were offered coffee and refreshments in the Gothic hall of the Presidential Palace.

The first evening reception was hosted by Ståhlberg and his wife in 1922, when the ceremony also included the now-traditional presidential greeting of guests, and a dance. Serving of alcohol at the event started after the abolition of the Finnish prohibition law in 1934. During the reign of president Kyösti Kallio in 1937 and 1938, there was no dancing or serving of alcohol due to prevailing religious beliefs. In the era of president J. K. Paasikivi the serving of punch was begun. Short films were made about the reception to be shown in movie theatres before the main feature.

Reporters were allowed in to cover the reception for the first time in 1949. The first live television broadcast of the reception was in 1967.

Due to the influence of president Urho Kekkonen's wife Sylvi, artists and writers were invited to the reception in 1966, and she hosted discussions with them in the Yellow Salon. At its height, there were up to 2300 guests at the Independence Day Reception. In 1968 the speciality at the reception was letkajenkka. The public was especially interested in whom the recently widowed president Kekkonen danced with at the 1978 reception (Satu Östring-Procopé).

After Mauno Koivisto became president in 1982, the event was once more hosted by a presidential couple and also their daughter, 'the princess of the republic', Assi Koivisto, who started a Chicken Dance at the reception. Tellervo Koivisto, the wife of president Koivisto, wanted to change the reception back to an afternoon coffee event, but eventually gave up after facing strong resistance.

During the era of president Martti Ahtisaari, jazz was brought to the Yellow Salon, and salty snacks, regional dishes and wines were added to the menu.

=== The years without reception ===
In the young Finnish Republic of the 1930s, neither the presidential institution nor the Independence Day reception were yet a tradition. An example of this is that in the year 1931, the reception was not held due to the 70th birthday of president P. E. Svinhufvud occurring in the same month. In 1932, the reception was skipped due to the state visit of the Swedish crown prince. The reception in 1933, during the Great Depression, was cancelled due to the lack of ingredients needed for preparing the banquet; this was also a show of solidarity towards the general public's struggle with poverty. The longest break in the tradition came with World War II when the reception was not held for seven years, 1939 - 1945. Thus, presidents Risto Ryti and Gustaf Mannerheim never got to host the event.

The Independence Day Reception was not held in the presidential palace in these years:

- 1926 President Lauri Kristian Relander was ill
- 1931 President Pehr Evind Svinhufvud had his 70th birthday on December 15
- 1932 The state visit of the Swedish crown prince Gustaf Adolf
- 1933 Economic depression
- 1939 Winter War
- 1940 President Kyösti Kallio was ill
- 1941–1942 Continuation War
- 1943 The reception was held in the Fire department of the City of Turku by president Risto Ryti. This was the first time in the history of Finnish independence for the reception to have been held outside Helsinki.
- 1944 Lapland War
- 1945 President Gustaf Mannerheim was ill
- 1952 President J. K. Paasikivi was ill
- 1972 Due to the refurbishment of the Presidential Palace, the reception was held at the Finlandia Hall by the Prime Minister, Kalevi Sorsa. President Urho Kekkonen was in attendance.
- 1974 President Urho Kekkonen's spouse Sylvi Kekkonen died on 2 December; period of national mourning.
- 1981 President Urho Kekkonen was ill: the reception was held in Finlandia Hall hosted by the Minister of the Interior Eino Uusitalo, as the Prime Minister Mauno Koivisto was the acting president at the moment.
- 2013 Refurbishment of the Presidential Palace: Independence Day Concert and Reception (without the dance) was held at Tampere Hall; this was the second time the reception was held outside Helsinki.
- 2020 Independence Day was celebrated remotely because of coronavirus restrictions. Instead of a reception, a television broadcast was made from the Presidential Palace and from all over Finland.
- 2021 Independence Day Reception was cancelled because of coronavirus restrictions.

== Invitees ==
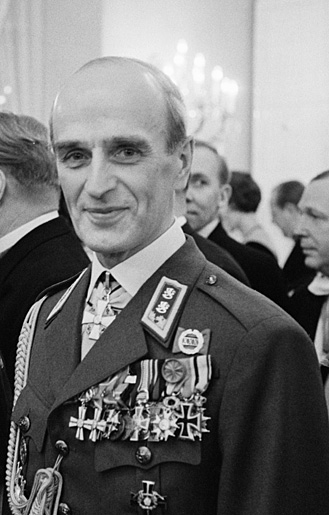
Adolf Ehrnrooth at the Independence Day Reception in 1963.

On average, about 1800 guests are invited to the Independence Day Reception every year. Some are invited due to their status: yearly invites are sent to the members of the Council of State, Members of parliament, Diplomats, bishops, Finnish members of the European parliament, chancellors and rectors of Finnish Universities, military generals and the most senior officials of the Judiciary. Former presidents, prime ministers and speakers of the parliament are also among regular invitees. President Martti Ahtisaari began the tradition of inviting all Knights of the Mannerheim cross, who had previously been summoned to the reception by president Koivisto in 1987. The invites to the senior state officials rotate, so that invitations are sent every second or third year.

Each year, approximately a third of the guests receive their first invite to the event. It has been a custom to invite the most prominent members of business and cultural life. The number of performing artists increased during the era of president Tarja Halonen.

In 2009, the invitations were embedded with a microchip due to safety concerns. The chips were used for identity verification.

The dress code for the occasion is very solemn, in the spirit of a White Tie event: the invitees are instructed to wear a "tailcoat and dress suit". Medallions of Honor can be worn in their original size. Men can use a dark suit - but not a tuxedo − instead of a tailcoat; for women the "evening dress" means a full-length gown made from a fine material, accompanied by jewellery. Artists have been given more leeway in following the dress code. Clergymen, police officers and military officers etc. arrive in their ceremonial dress.

Both men and women can dress in the traditional folk costume if they so choose. According to experts, it is the best option for the occasion, as it fits the etiquette and also emphasises Finland's national identity.

== The ceremony ==
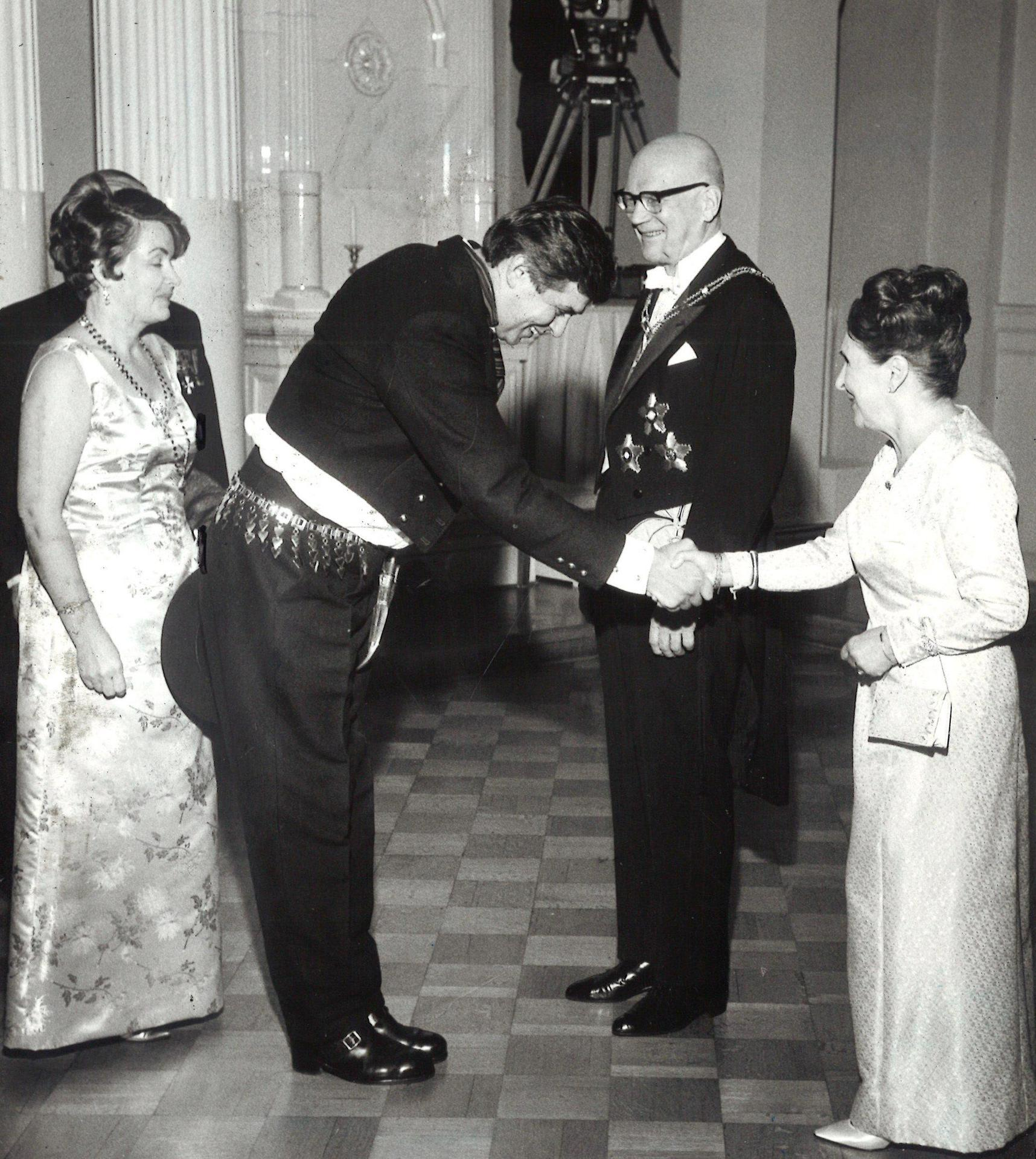
Actor Tarmo Manni greeting Sylvi Kekkonen in 1965.

Traditionally all guests greet the president personally upon entering. The first guests - war veterans - enter from the Mariankatu entrance, accompanied by the sounds of Jäger March by Jean Sibelius. The first to greet the president are the Knights of the Mannerheim cross. Between 1994 - 2000 the first guest to enter the Palace was always the General of Infantry Adolf Ehrnrooth. Years 2001 - 2007, the procession was headed by Captain Pentti Iisalo. Captain Tuomas Gerdt was the first in 2008 - 2010, 2012 and 2014–2015. In 2011, when Gerdt was not able to attend, the President was first greeted by Antti Henttonen. In 2013 the first was war veteran Vihtori Siivo. In 2016 and 2017, the president was greeted first by General Jaakko Valtanen, and he was on both occasions followed by veterans Torsten Liljeberg in 2016 and Erkki Pitkänen in 2017, respectively.

While the guests enter, cadets from the National Defence University stand to order with their swords. After the veterans have entered, the entrance order for guests from the Mariankatu entrance is free and depends more on the order of arrival of the guests, who include members of parliament, athletes and representatives from the fields of arts, sciences and financial life.

After the Mariankatu entrance is closed, the proceedings continue with the guests entering from the Pohjoisesplanadi entrance in the following order:

1. Bishops, headed by the Archbishop of the largest religious body in Finland, the Evangelical Lutheran Church of Finland
2. Members of the Parliament of Åland and Sami Parliament of Finland
3. Generals
4. Commanders of the Grand Cross
5. Presidents of the judiciary and representatives of the Prosecutor's office
6. Members of the Academy of Finland, followed by the chancellors and rectors of Universities
7. Former Speakers of Parliament and former Prime Ministers
8. Council of State in the order of protocol; Prime Minister, Minister of Finance, Minister of Foreign Affairs, etc., ending with the Chancellor of Justice
9. Speaker and Deputy Speakers of the Parliament of Finland, followed by the secretariat of the parliament
10. Diplomats in order by seniority, Ambassadors and representatives from international organisations
11. Former Presidents of Finland

After the former presidents have entered, the former and current presidents pose with their spouses for press photography.

The recipe for the punch offered at the reception is a secret. After the guests have entered, coffee is served, followed by the dances, which are traditionally begun by the President, with guests joining in later on. The music is traditionally provided by Kaartin Soittokunta.

== Publicity ==
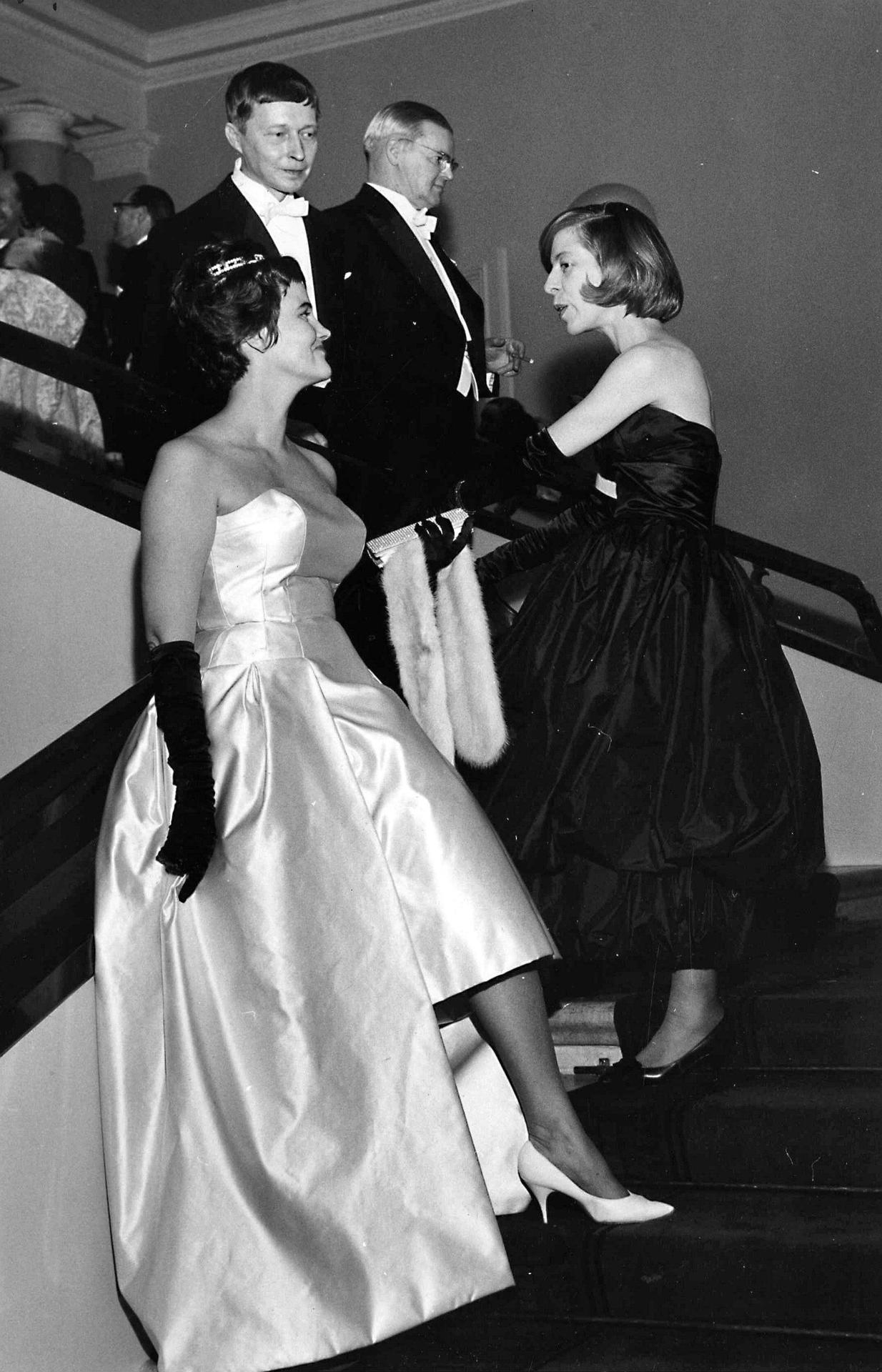
Designers Nanny Still and Birger Kaipiainen accompanied by Mrs. Maggi Kaipiainen at the stairwell of the Presidential Palace in 1960.

It is customary that the press begins to speculate about the names of the invitees to the Independence Day Reception weeks in advance, along with the selection of gowns and possible partners for the guests. Especially female guests often order special gowns for the occasion from well-known designers.

=== Finnish Broadcasting Company ===
The first radio broadcast of the event, made by the Finnish Broadcasting Company, was heard in 1949. Televised broadcasts began in 1957. Live television broadcasts were made in 1967, 1968 and since 1982. Between 1969 and 1980, only ten, edited-down programmes of the reception were aired. In the new millennium, the live broadcasts have been focusing mainly on the celebrities attending the event.

The broadcast from the Independence Day Reception is very popular in Finland. For example, in 2008, it was the most followed programme on television, gathering over 1.5 million live viewers. In 2009 over 2.2 million viewers tuned in. In 2017, the broadcast reached 3.6 million viewers out of the population of 5.5 million, with the sustained average viewership of 2.66 million.

=== Audience of the main televised broadcast ===
Year	Audience	Ref
2008	1 748 000	
2009	2 200 000	
2010	2 123 000	
2011	2 324 000	
2012	2 189 000	
2013	2 045 000	
2014	2 147 000	
2015	2 472 000	
2016	2 610 000	
2017	2 660 000	
2018	2 510 000	

== The Gatecrashers' Reception ==
From the beginning of the 1990s until 2003, and again in 2006, the Independence Day Reception was accompanied by protests known as the "Gatecrashers' Reception". In 2013, when the Independence Day event was held in the city of Tampere, it was accompanied by protesters with balaclavas and Timo Jutila masks, and due to violence, dozens were arrested by the 300 police officers present to secure the event.
