= Arajärvi =

Arajärvi is a Finnish surname. Notable people with the surname include:

- Juhani Arajärvi (1867–1941), Finnish politician
- Pentti Arajärvi (born 1948), Finnish law academic
- Terttu Arajärvi (1922–2014), Finnish paediatrician; mother of Pentti Arajärvi
