= Spouses of presidents of Finland =

Spouse of the president of Finland
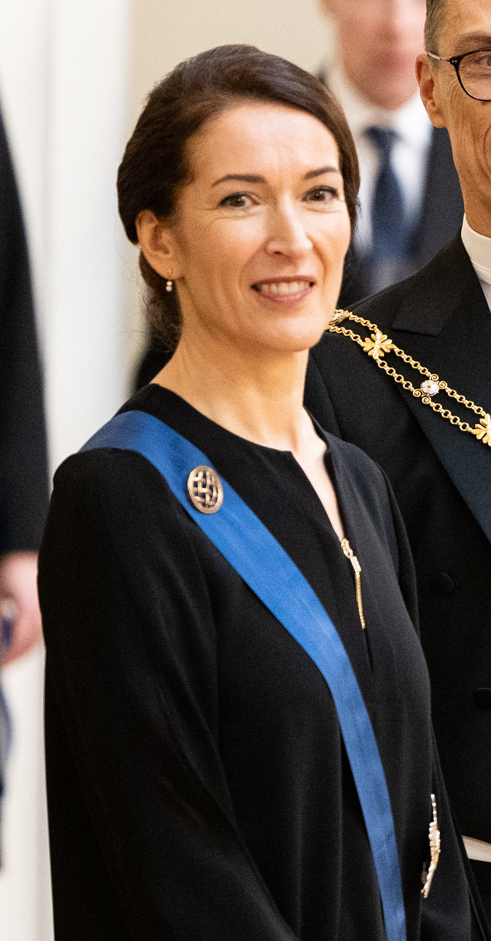
- Incumbent; Suzanne Innes-Stubb since 1 March 2024
- Residence: Presidential Palace (ceremonial); Mäntyniemi (residential); Kultaranta (summer residence)
- Inaugural holder: Ester Ståhlberg
- Formation: July 26, 1919 (107 years ago)

The spouse of the president of Finland has no official role or title, but they often play a ceremonial role alongside the president of Finland.

The first presidential spouse was Ester Ståhlberg, who married the then-incumbent President K. J. Ståhlberg in 1920.

The current spouse is Suzanne Innes-Stubb, wife of President Alexander Stubb, who has held the position since 1 March 2024.

The only man to have been spouse of a president of Finland is Pentti Arajärvi, the partner and husband of President Tarja Halonen, who served from 2000 to 2012. They married in 2000 in Mäntyniemi, during her first term.

== Spouses ==
President	In office	Spouse	Marriage years	Children
K. J. Ståhlberg 1919–1925	1919–1920	Hedvig Ståhlberg	1893–1917 †	Kaarlo Ståhlberg
K. J. Ståhlberg 1919–1925	1919–1920	Hedvig Ståhlberg	1893–1917 †	Aino Kjerrman
K. J. Ståhlberg 1919–1925	1919–1920	Hedvig Ståhlberg	1893–1917 †	Elli Schauman
K. J. Ståhlberg 1919–1925	1919–1920	Hedvig Ståhlberg	1893–1917 †	Aune Ståhlberg
K. J. Ståhlberg 1919–1925	1919–1920	Hedvig Ståhlberg	1893–1917 †	Juho Ståhlberg
K. J. Ståhlberg 1919–1925	1919–1920	Hedvig Ståhlberg	1893–1917 †	Kyllikki Tuominen
K. J. Ståhlberg 1919–1925	1919–1920	Ester Ståhlberg	1920–1950	
L. K. Relander1925–1931	1920–1925	Signe Relander	1906–1942	Maja-Lisa Backman
L. K. Relander1925–1931	1920–1925	Signe Relander	1906–1942	Ragnar Relander
P. E. Svinhufvud1931–1937	1931–1937	Ellen Svinhufvud	1889–1944	Yngve Svinhufvud
P. E. Svinhufvud1931–1937	1931–1937	Ellen Svinhufvud	1889–1944	Gretel Sommar
P. E. Svinhufvud1931–1937	1931–1937	Ellen Svinhufvud	1889–1944	Mary Alftan
P. E. Svinhufvud1931–1937	1931–1937	Ellen Svinhufvud	1889–1944	Eino Svinhufvud
P. E. Svinhufvud1931–1937	1931–1937	Ellen Svinhufvud	1889–1944	Arne Svinhufvud
P. E. Svinhufvud1931–1937	1931–1937	Ellen Svinhufvud	1889–1944	Veikko Svinhufvud
Kyösti Kallio1937–1940	1937–1940†	Kaisa Kallio	1902–1940†	Vieno Kallio
Kyösti Kallio1937–1940	1937–1940†	Kaisa Kallio	1902–1940†	Veikko Kallio
Kyösti Kallio1937–1940	1937–1940†	Kaisa Kallio	1902–1940†	Kerttu Saalasti
Kyösti Kallio1937–1940	1937–1940†	Kaisa Kallio	1902–1940†	Kalervo Kallio
Kyösti Kallio1937–1940	1937–1940†	Kaisa Kallio	1902–1940†	Kaino Pihlajamaa
Kyösti Kallio1937–1940	1937–1940†	Kaisa Kallio	1902–1940†	Katri Kaarlonen
Risto Ryti1940–1944	1940–1944	Gerda Ryti	1916–1956	Henrik Ryti
Risto Ryti1940–1944	1940–1944	Gerda Ryti	1916–1956	Niilo Ryti
Risto Ryti1940–1944	1940–1944	Gerda Ryti	1916–1956	Eva Saxén
Gustaf Mannerheim 1944–1946	1944–1946	Anastasija Mannerheim	1892–1919	Anastasie Mannerheim
Gustaf Mannerheim 1944–1946	1944–1946	Anastasija Mannerheim	1892–1919	Sophie Mannerheim
J. K. Paasikivi1946–1956	1946–1956	Anna Paasikivi	1897–1931 †	Annikki Paasikivi
J. K. Paasikivi1946–1956	1946–1956	Anna Paasikivi	1897–1931 †	Wellamo Ant-Wuorinen
J. K. Paasikivi1946–1956	1946–1956	Anna Paasikivi	1897–1931 †	Juhani Paasikivi
J. K. Paasikivi1946–1956	1946–1956	Anna Paasikivi	1897–1931 †	Varma Paasikivi
J. K. Paasikivi1946–1956	1946–1956	Alli Paasikivi	1934–1956	
Urho Kekkonen1956–1982	1956–1974†			
Urho Kekkonen1956–1982	1956–1974†	Sylvi Kekkonen	1926–1974 †	Matti Kekkonen
Urho Kekkonen1956–1982	1956–1974†	Sylvi Kekkonen	1926–1974 †	Taneli Kekkonen
Mauno Koivisto1982–1994	1982–1994	Tellervo Koivisto	1952–2017	Assi Koivisto
Martti Ahtisaari 1994–2000	1994–2000	Eeva Ahtisaari	1968–2023	Marko Ahtisaari
Tarja Halonen 2000–2012	2000–2012	Kari Pekkonen	cohabitation	Anna Halonen
Tarja Halonen 2000–2012	2000–2012	Pentti Arajärvi	2000–present	
Sauli Niinistö 2012–2024	2012–2024	Marja-Leena Niinistö	1974–1995 †	Nuutti Niinistö
Sauli Niinistö 2012–2024	2012–2024	Marja-Leena Niinistö	1974–1995 †	Matias Niinistö
Sauli Niinistö 2012–2024	2012–2024	Jenni Haukio	2009–present	Aaro Niinistö
Alexander Stubb 2024–	2024–	Suzanne Innes-Stubb	1998–present	Emilie Stubb
Alexander Stubb 2024–	2024–	Suzanne Innes-Stubb	1998–present	Oliver Stubb

== Gallery ==
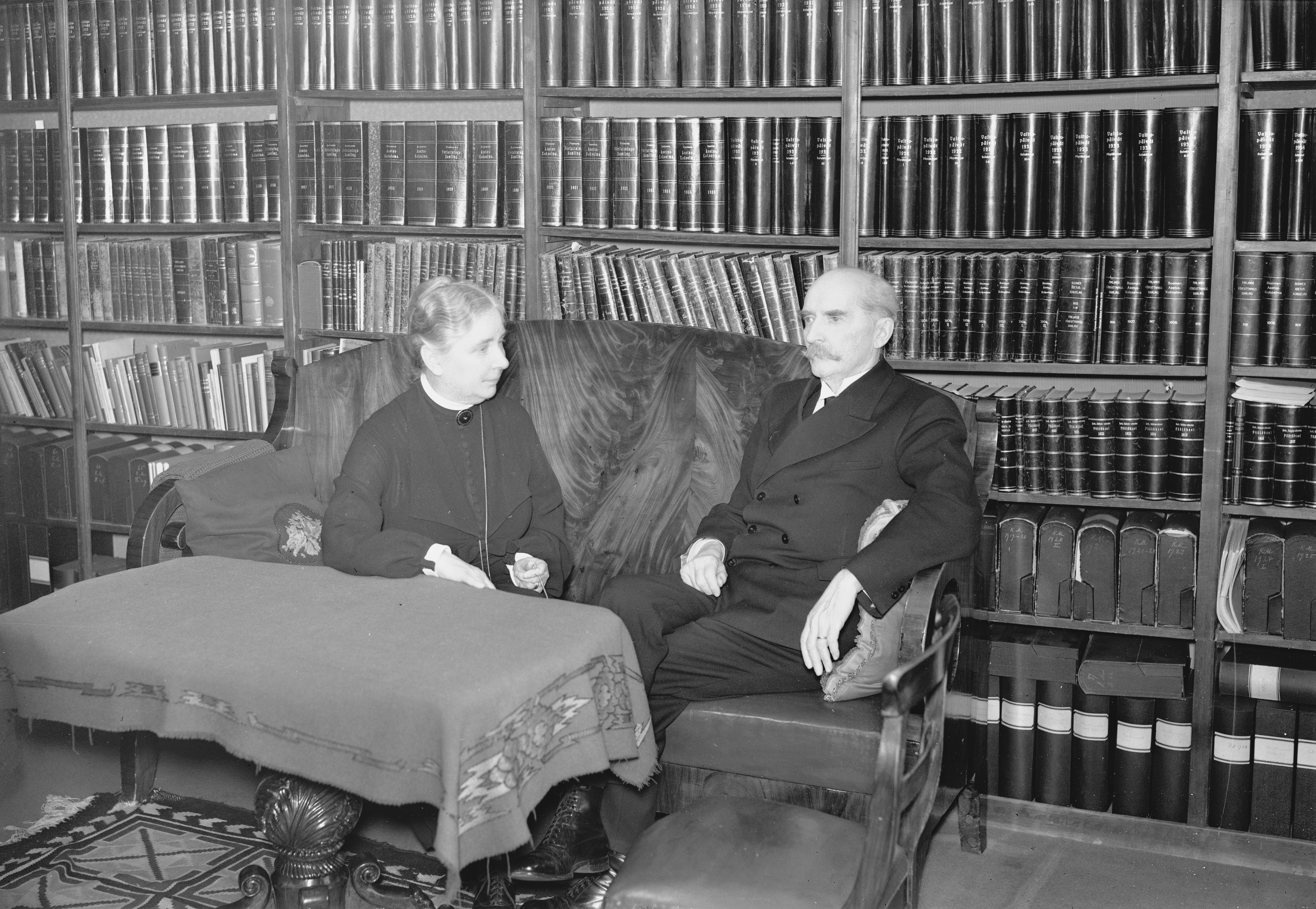
President K. J. Ståhlberg and his wife, Ester Ståhlberg

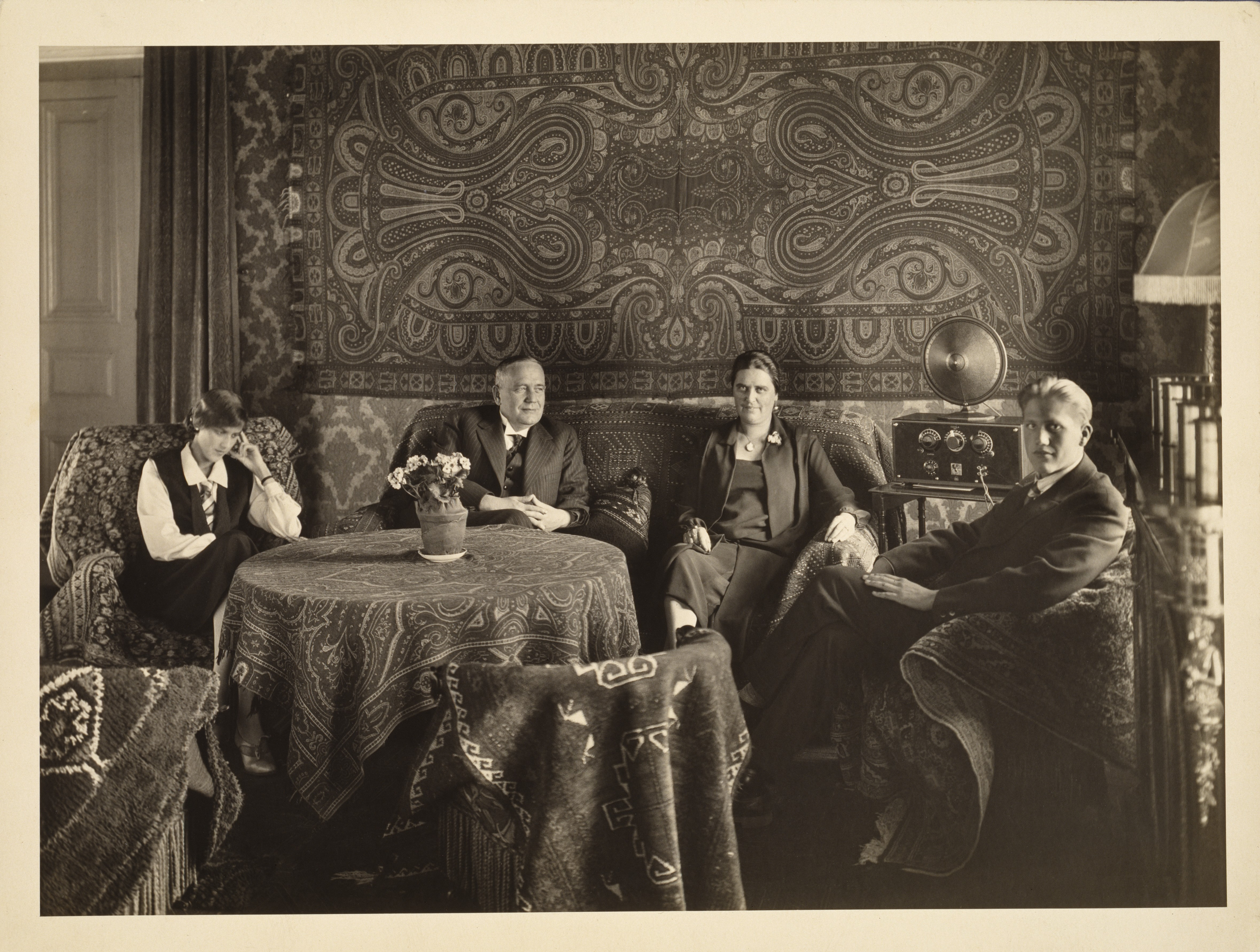
President L.K. Relander and his wife, Signe Relander

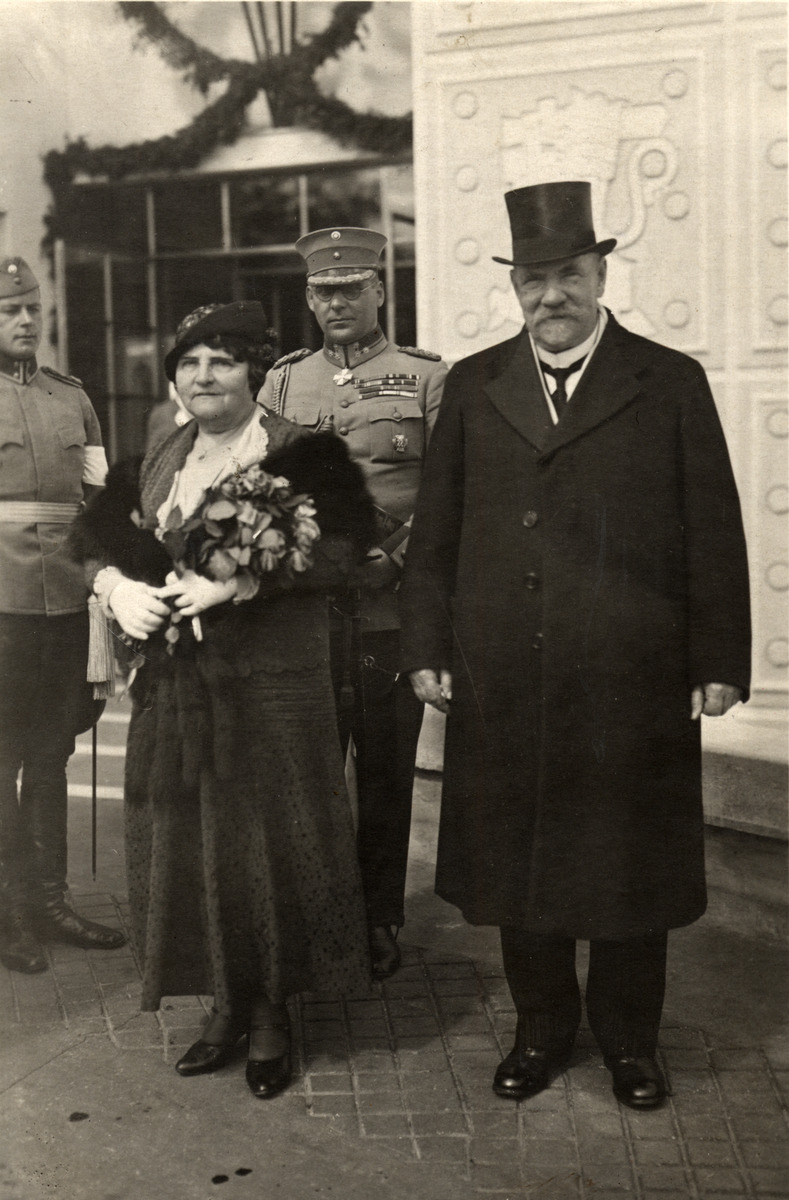
President P. E. Svinhufvud and his wife, Ellen Svinhufvud

President Kyösti Kallio and his wife, Kaisa Kallio

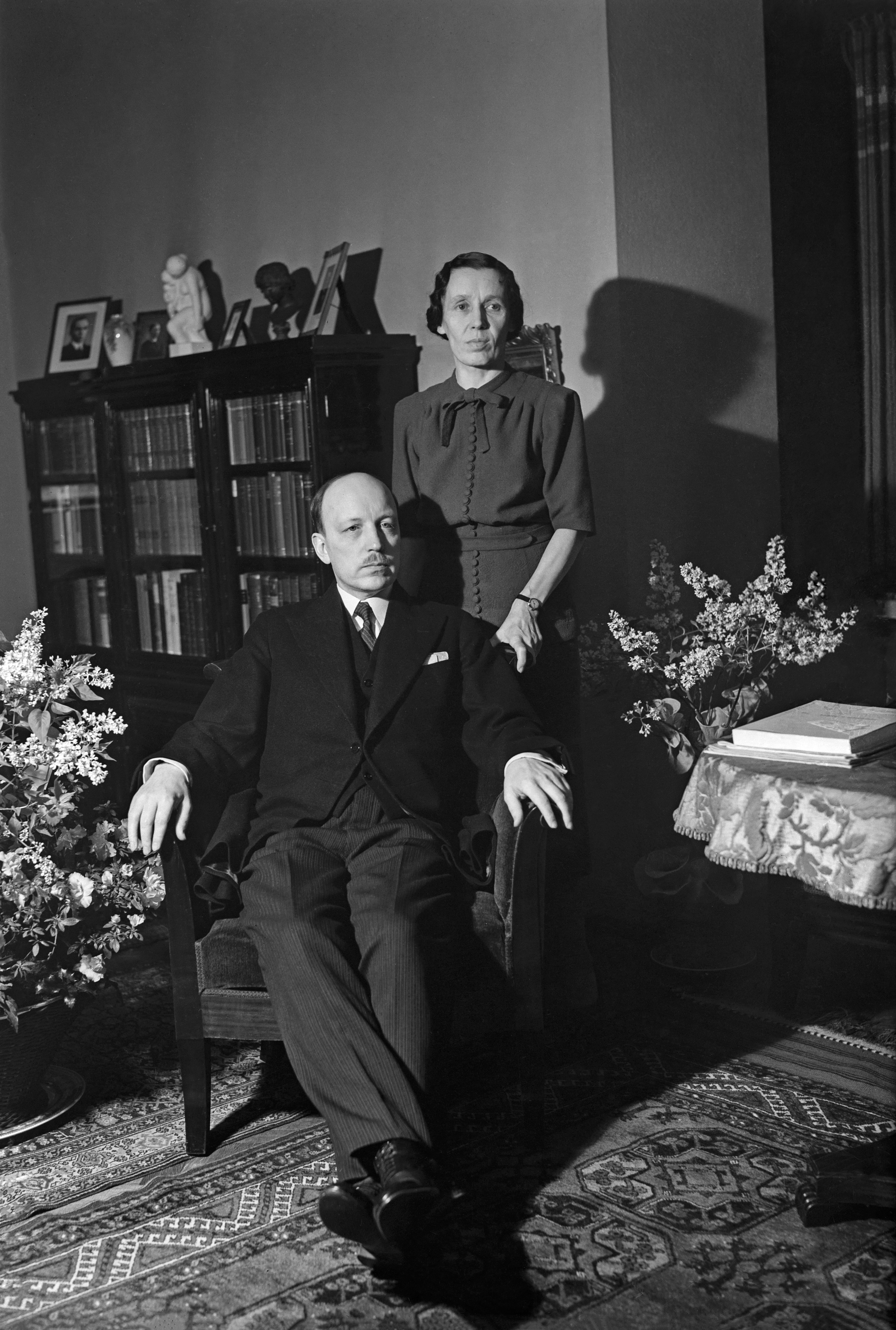
President Risto Ryti and his wife, Gerda Ryti

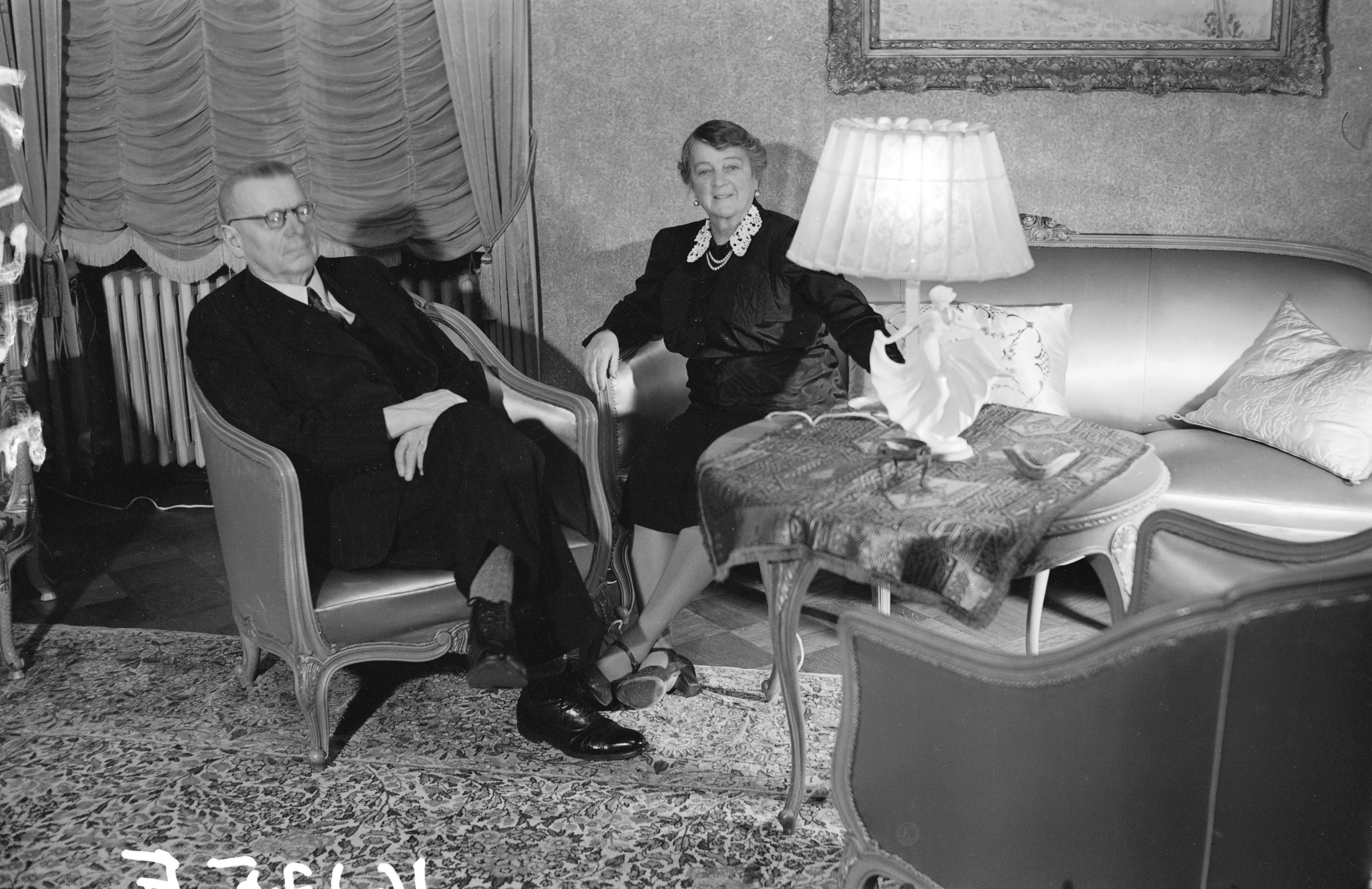
President J. K. Paasikivi and his wife, Alli Paasikivi

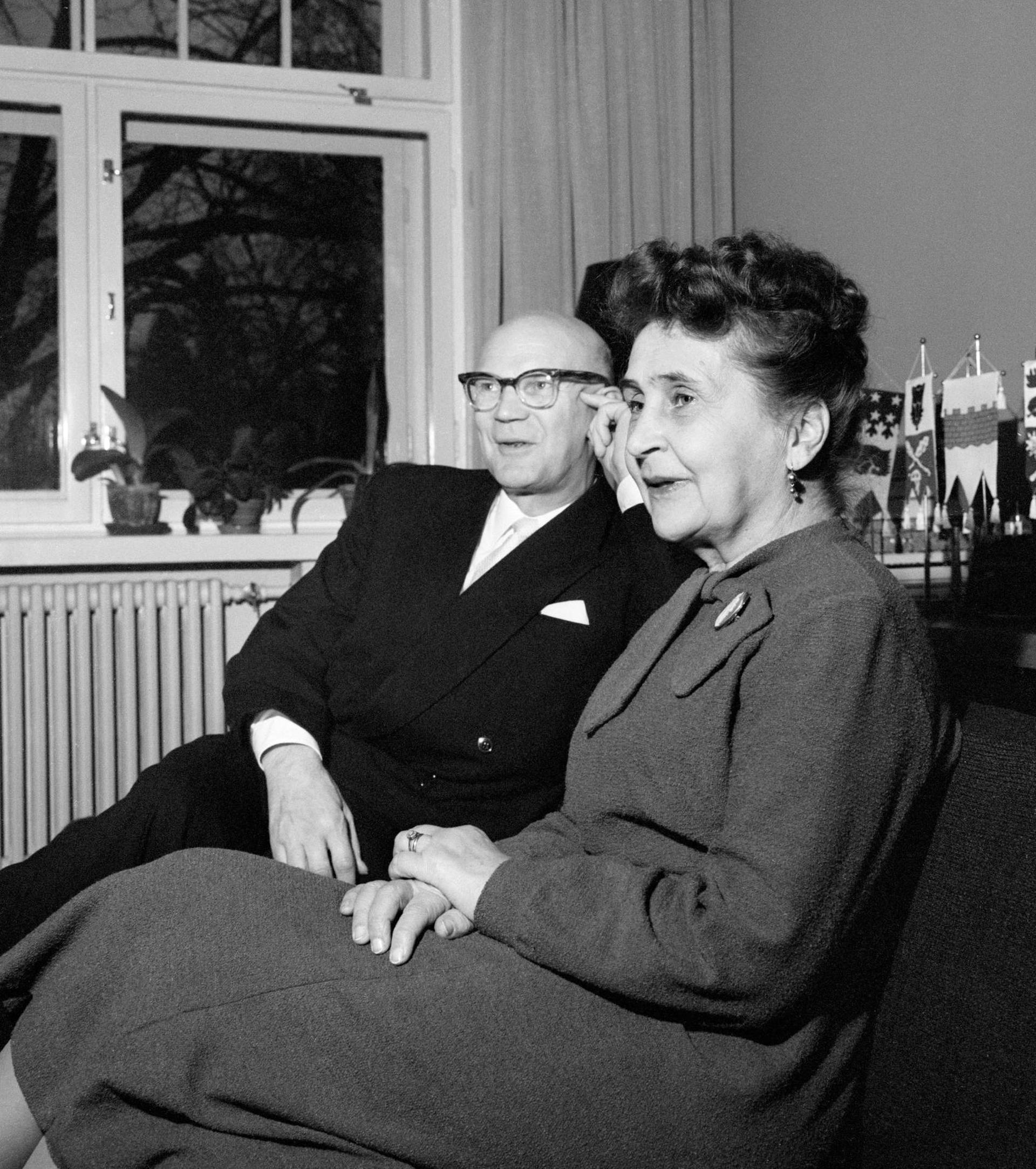
President Urho Kekkonen and his wife, Sylvi Kekkonen

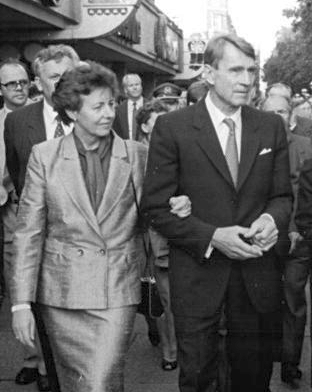
President Mauno Koivisto and his wife, Tellervo Koivisto

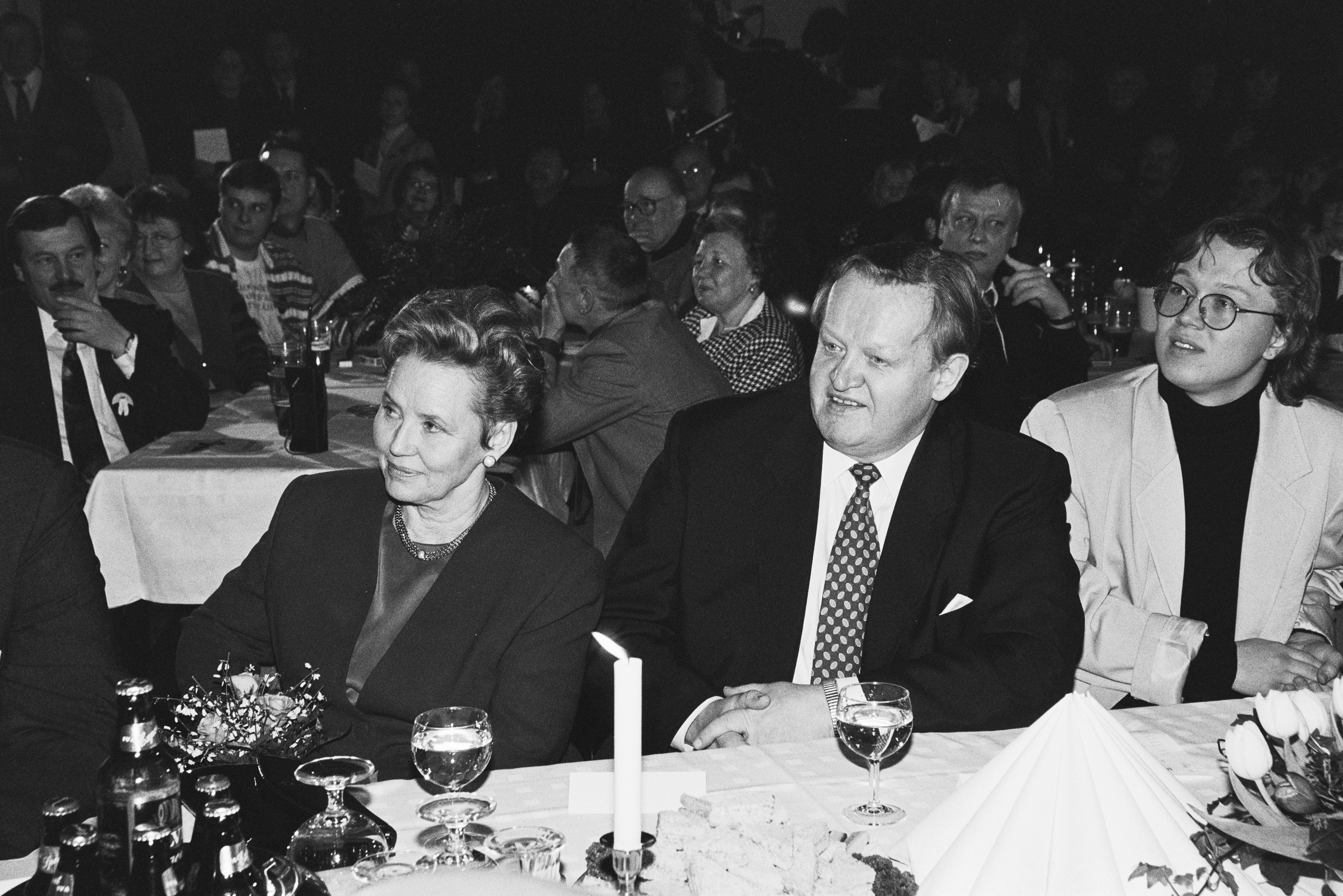
President Martti Ahtisaari and his wife, Eeva Ahtisaari

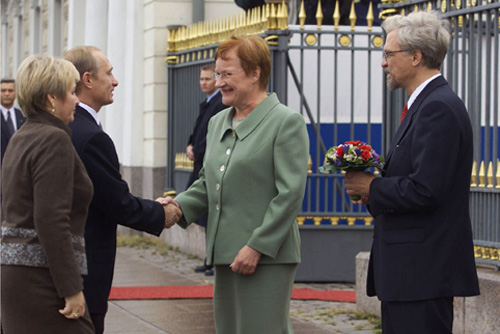
President Tarja Halonen and her husband, Dr Pentti Arajärvi

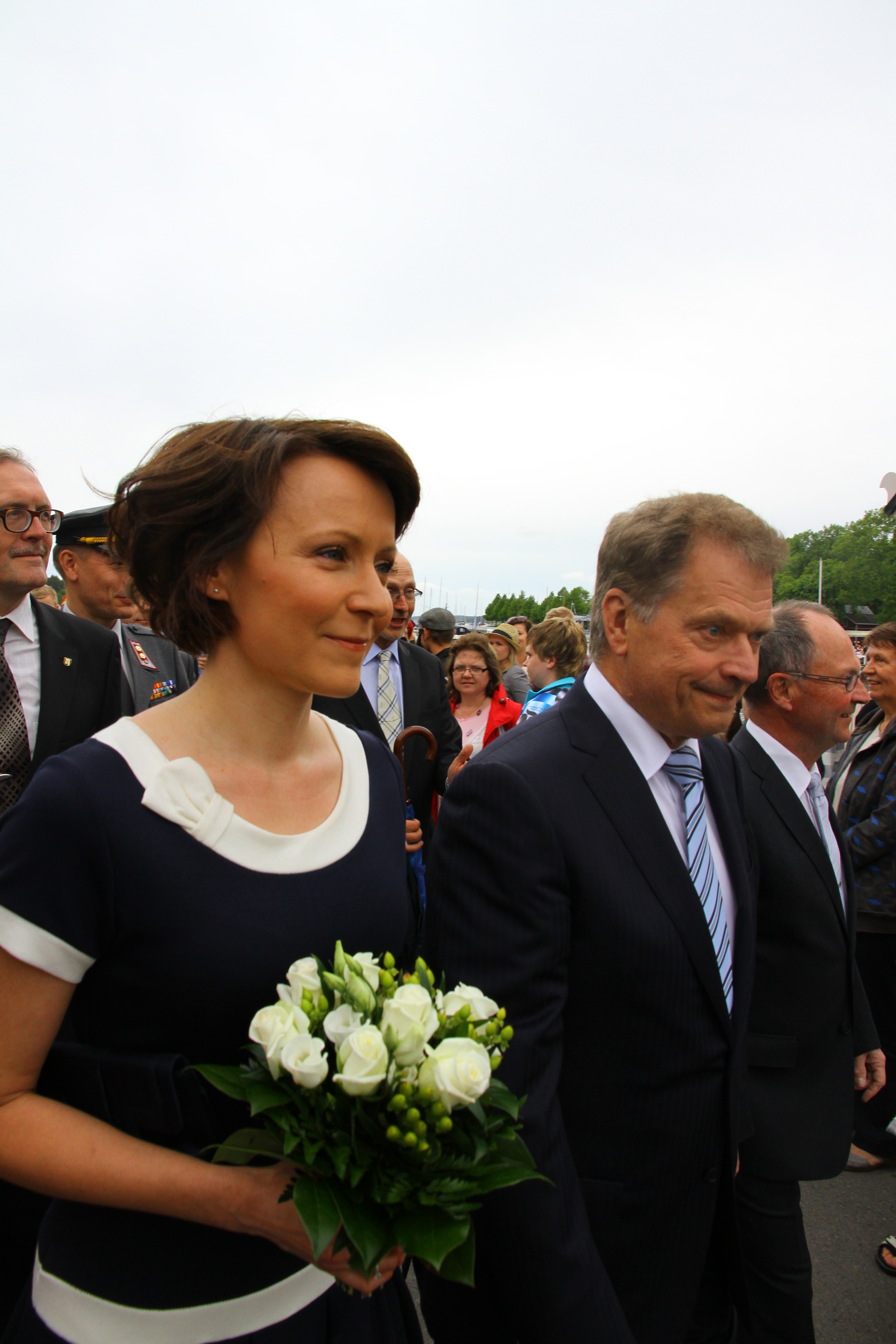
President Sauli Niinistö and his wife, Jenni Haukio

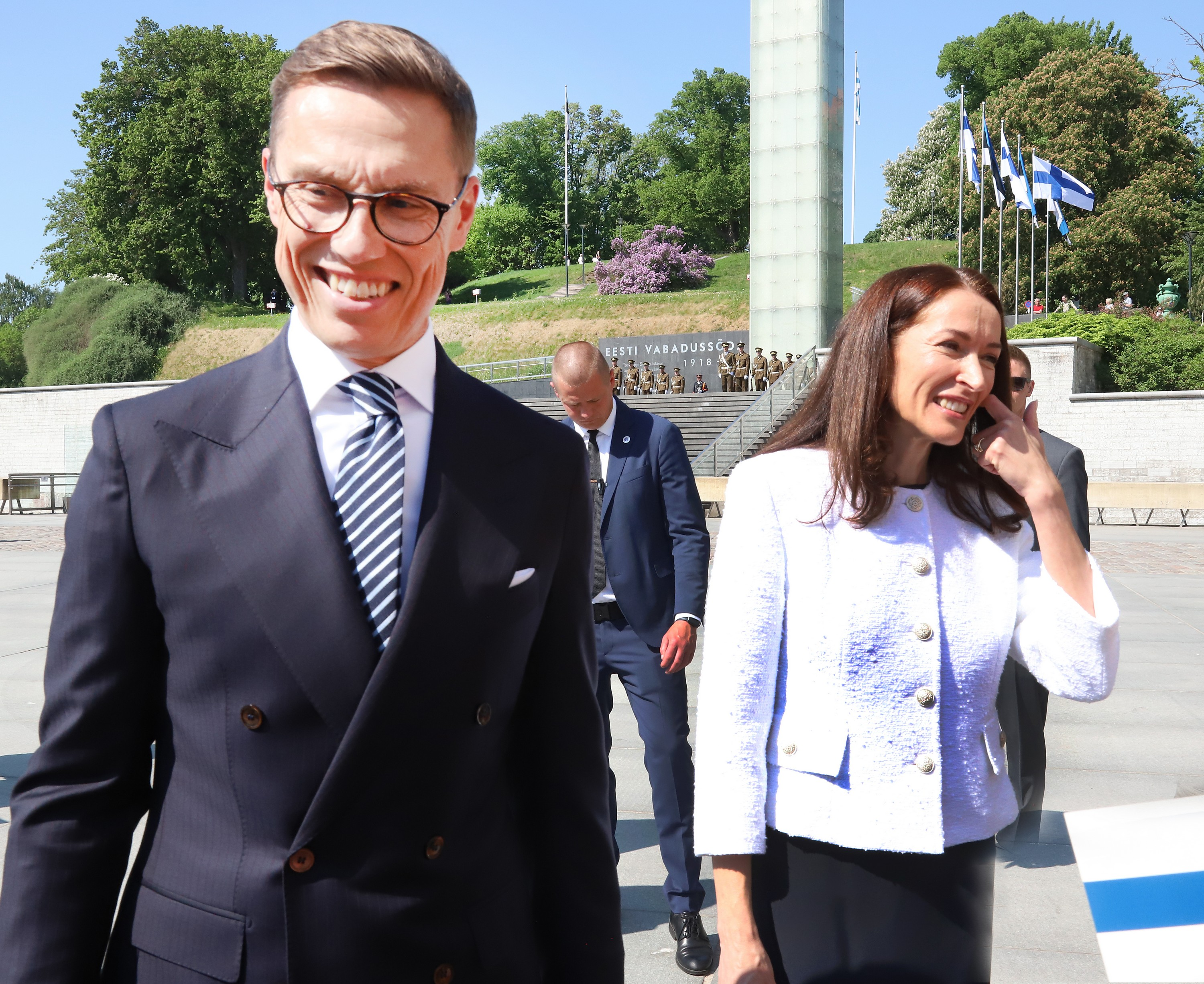
President Alexander Stubb and his wife, Suzanne Innes-Stubb

== Sources ==
- Väyrynen, Raimo (1992). Tasavallan presidentit (1919–1931) (in Finnish). Vol. I. Weilin+Göös, Espoo. ISBN 951-35-5426-0.
- Väyrynen, Raimo (1994). Tasavallan presidentit (1931–1940) (in Finnish). Vol. II.
- Väyrynen, Raimo (1996). Tasavallan presidentit (1940–1956) (in Finnish). Vol. III. ISBN 951355872X.
- Väyrynen, Raimo (1998). Tasavallan presidentit (1956–1981) (in Finnish). Vol. IV.
- Väyrynen, Raimo (2000). Tasavallan presidentit (1981-1994) (in Finnish). Vol. V.
