= Gerda Ryti =

First Lady of Finland 1940–1944

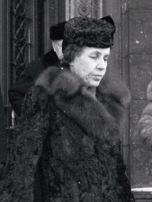
- Gerda Ryti in 1945
- Born: Gerda Paula Serlachius; 11 October 1886; Viipuri, Grand Duchy of Finland
- Died: 8 September 1984 (aged 97); Helsinki, Finland
- Spouse: Risto Ryti (m. 1916; died 1956)

Gerda Ryti (née Serlachius; 11 October 1886 – 8 September 1984) was the wife of Finland's fifth president, Risto Ryti, serving as the First Lady of Finland from 1940 until 1944.

Gerda Paula Serlachius was born as the second child to Senator and Justice Counselor (Oikeusneuvos) Julian Serlachius and Paula née Söderhjelm. Her elder brother was Eric J. Serlachius, who became a lawyer and, later, Minister of Justice.

She received her primary and secondary education in her native Swedish. She went on to study German language, literature and history of art at a university in Dresden, Germany, and later English language in London.

In 1916, she married her brother's business partner, the lawyer and politician, and future President of Finland, Risto Ryti. The couple had three children.

Her cultured upbringing, education and excellent language skills (she spoke five languages fluently) came useful in her role as the wife of Risto Ryti, in his high-profile positions as the Governor of the Bank of Finland, later as the Prime Minister, and finally President. She was known as a hardworking First Lady, who supported her husband during his wartime premiership and presidency, and the war's difficult aftermath.

Her personal interests included parapsychology, which she had studied while in the UK, as well as spiritualism.
