= Eeva Ahtisaari =

Finnish teacher and historian

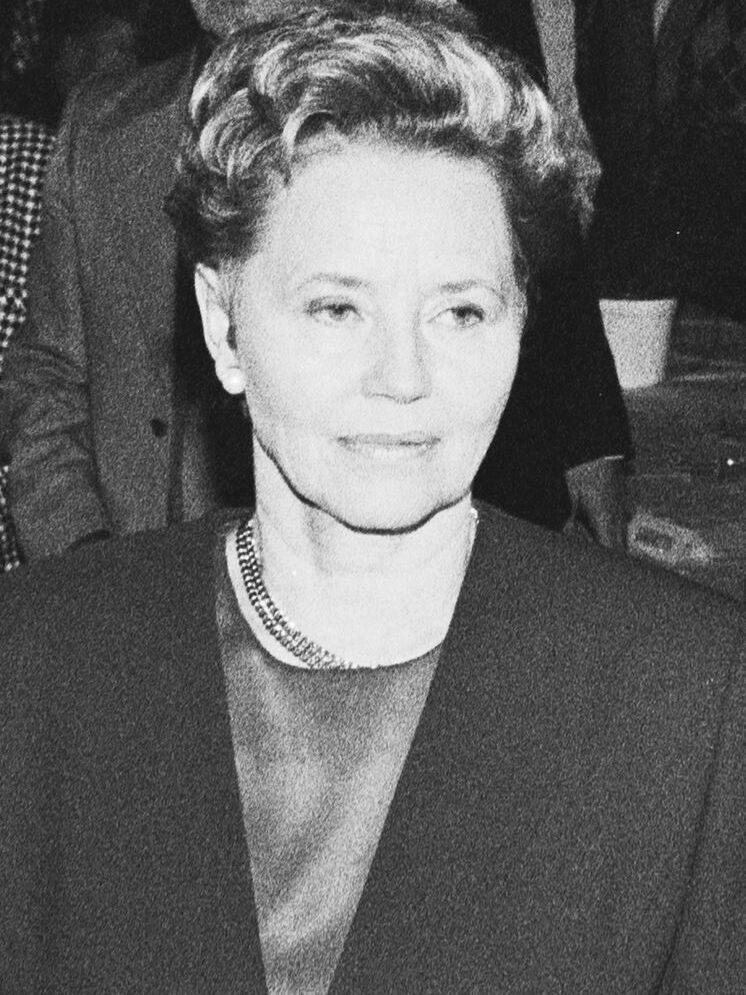
- Eeva Ahtisaari in 1994

Spouse of the President of Finland
- In role March 1, 1994 – March 1, 2000
- President: Martti Ahtisaari
- Preceded by: Tellervo Koivisto
- Succeeded by: Pentti Arajärvi

Personal details
- Born: June 18, 1936 (age 90) Varkaus, Finland
- Spouse: Martti Ahtisaari (m. 1968; died 2023)
- Education: University of Helsinki
- Occupation: Bachelor of Arts (1962); Master of Arts (1988)

Eeva Irmeli Ahtisaari (née Hyvärinen, born June 18, 1936) is a Finnish teacher and historian who was the First Lady of Finland from 1994 to 2000. She was married to the late 10th President of Finland Martti Ahtisaari. Their son is the musician Marko Ahtisaari.

== Life ==
Eeva Ahtisaari graduated from the University of Helsinki in 1962 and worked as a history teacher in Kuopio, Rovaniemi and Espoo. In 1974–1989, Ahtisaari lived in Tanzania and Namibia as her husband Martti Ahtisaari worked as a diplomat and UN Special Representative. Ahtisaari's autobiography Juuret ja siivet (Roots and Wings) was published in 2002.

On 21 March 2020, it was announced that Eeva Ahtisaari was tested positive for the coronavirus. She attended the International Women's Day concert on 8 March at the Helsinki Music Centre while infected. The former President of Finland Tarja Halonen was also present at the concert but she was not infected.

== Honours ==
=== National honours ===
- Grand Cross of the Order of the White Rose of Finland (1994)

=== Foreign honours ===
- Denmark: Grand Cross of the Order of the Dannebrog
- Estonia: First Class of the Order of the Cross of Terra Mariana (1995)
- Iceland: Grand Cross of the Order of the Falcon (26 September 1995)
- Sweden: Member Grand Cross of the Royal Order of the Polar Star (1994)
- Namibia: Honorary citizenship (1992)

== Literal works ==
- Yksi kamari – kaksi sukupuolta: Suomen eduskunnan ensimmäiset naiset, Helsinki; Parliament of Finland, 1997. ISBN 951-69240-2-6
- Juuret ja siivet, Helsinki; WSOY, 2002. ISBN 951-02729-6-5
- Eeva Ahtisaari, Maija Kauppinen, Aura Korppi-Tommola: Tavoitteena tasa-arvo: Suomen Naisyhdistys 125 vuotta, Helsinki; Finnish Literature Society, 2009. ISBN 978-952-22211-0-0
