= Jenni Haukio =

Finnish poet and first lady of Finland (born 1977)

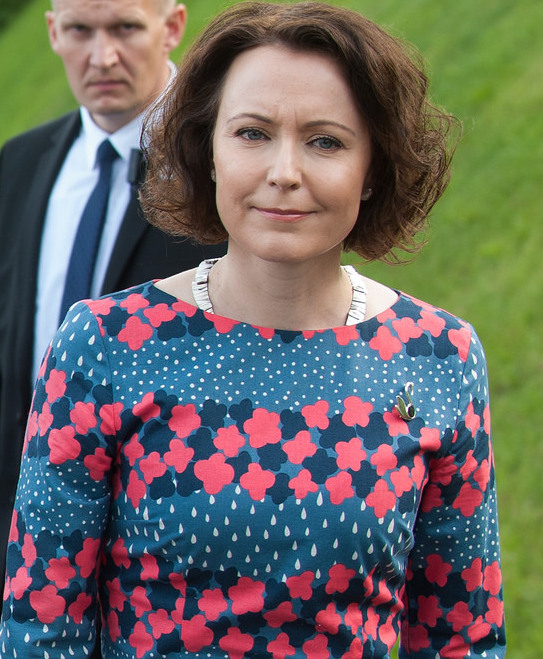
- Haukio in 2017

Spouse of the President of Finland
- In role 1 March 2012 – 1 March 2024
- President: Sauli Niinistö
- Preceded by: Pentti Arajärvi
- Succeeded by: Suzanne Innes-Stubb

Personal details
- Born: Jenni Elina Haukio; 7 April 1977 (age 49) Pori, Finland
- Spouse: Sauli Niinistö (m. 2009)
- Children: 1
- Education: University of Turku (M.Soc.Sc.); University of Helsinki (D.Soc.Sc.)
- Occupation: Poet

Jenni Elina Haukio (born 7 April 1977) is a Finnish poet, political scientist and the spouse of the president of Finland from 2012 to 2024. She is the second wife of the former president of Finland, Sauli Niinistö.

== Career ==
Haukio graduated from the University of Turku with a master of political sciences degree in 2001. She completed her political science doctoral thesis on the digitisation of party campaigns at the University of Helsinki in 2022.

She worked at the University of Turku, first as a research assistant and then as a communications officer. From 2003 to 2005, she was a parliamentary assistant, and from 2005 to 2012 she worked for the National Coalition Party. Since February 2012, Haukio has been the programme manager for the Turku Book Fair.

Haukio has published three poetry collections. The first one won a national debut poet contest, Runo-Kaarina, in 1999.

== Personal life ==
Haukio met Sauli Niinistö, then a widower, in 2005, while she was working for the National Coalition Party. Haukio interviewed Niinistö for the party's Nykypäivä magazine. They later became a couple, but they kept their relationship a secret from the public until their marriage on 3 January 2009. Their first child, a son named Aaro Veli Väinämö Niinistö, was born on 2 February 2018.

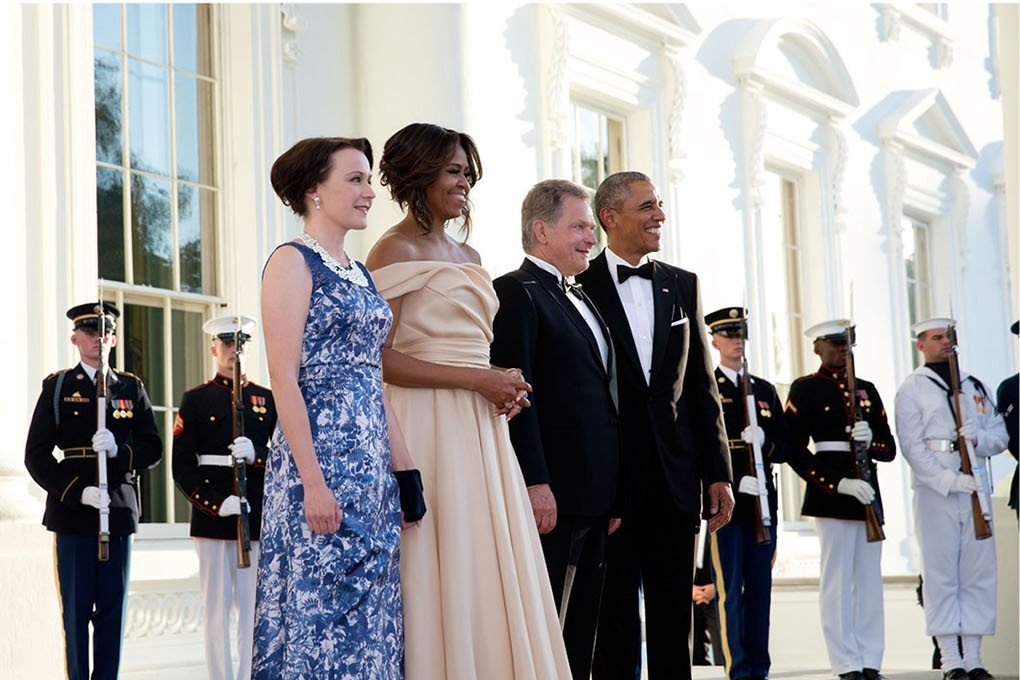
The Obamas, Sauli Niinistö and Jenni Haukio before the State Dinner in 2016

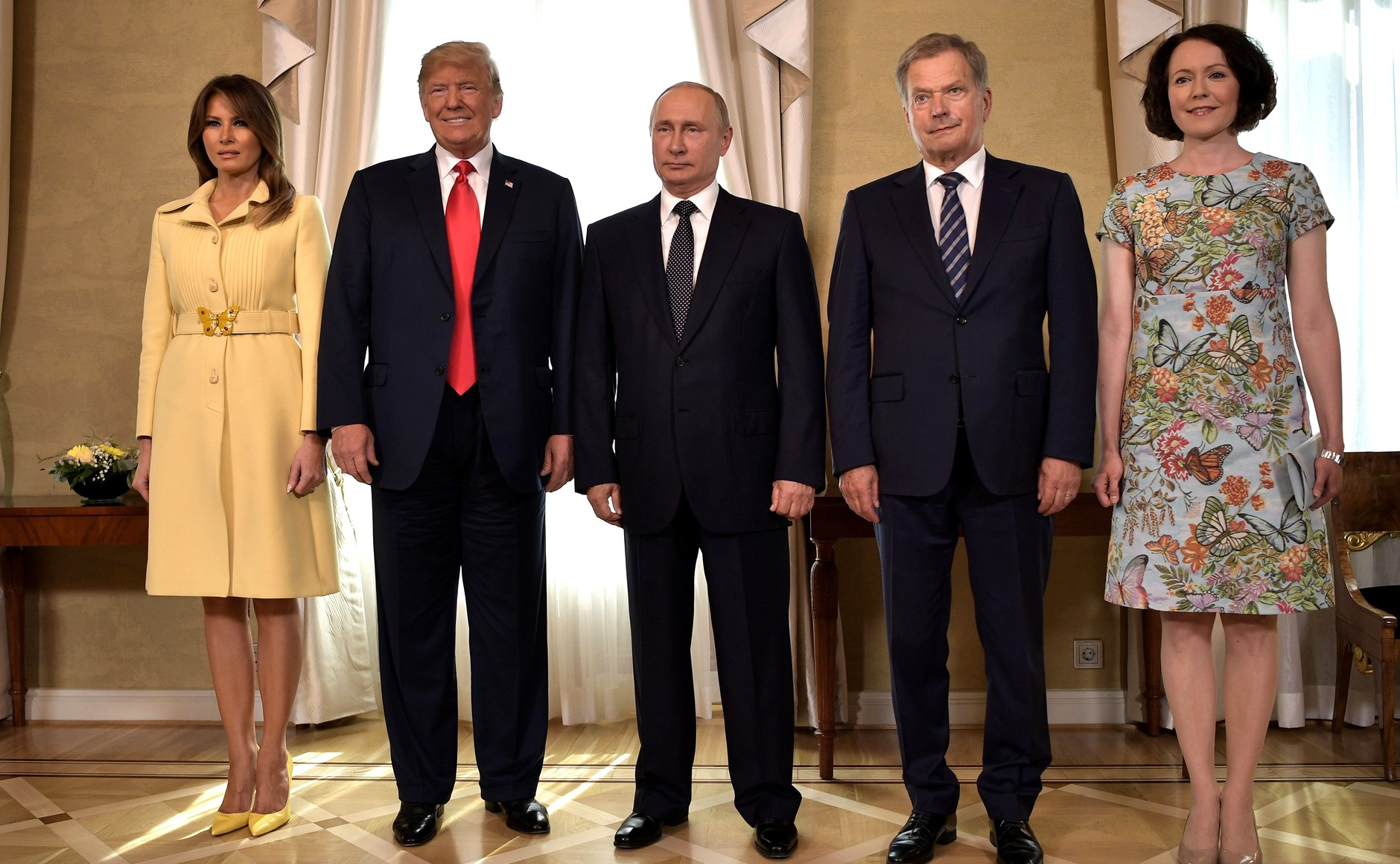
Jenni Haukio (right) with US-First Lady Melania Trump, US-President Donald Trump, Russian President Vladimir Putin and Sauli Niinistö in the 2018 Russia–United States Summit in Helsinki.

== Honours ==
=== Finnish decorations ===
- Finland: Commander Grand Cross of the Order of the White Rose of Finland

=== Foreign decorations ===
- Denmark: Grand Cross of the Order of the Dannebrog (April 2013)
- Estonia: First Class of the Order of the Cross of Terra Mariana (May 2014)
- France: Grand Cross of the Order of National Merit (July 2013)
- Germany: Grand Cross 1st class of the Order of Merit of the Federal Republic of Germany (September 2018)
- Iceland: Grand Cross of the Order of the Falcon (May 2018)
- Italy: Knight Grand Cross of the Order of Merit of the Italian Republic (23 October 2023)
- Latvia: Commander Grand Cross of the Order of the Three Stars (October 2013)
- Luxembourg: Cross of Honour of the Order of Adolphe of Nassau (10 May 2016)
- Norway: Grand Cross of the Royal Norwegian Order of Merit (October 2012)
- Poland: Grand Cross of the Order of Merit of the Republic of Poland (March 2015)
- Sweden:
  - Member Grand Cross of the Order of the Polar Star (April 2012)
  - Recipient of the 70th Birthday Badge Medal of King Carl XVI Gustaf (30 April 2016)
  - Recipient of the Golden Jubilee Medal of King Carl XVI Gustaf (15 September 2023)

Unofficial roles
| Preceded by Pentti Arajärvi | Spouse of the President of Finland; 2012–2024 | Succeeded by Suzanne Innes-Stubb |
