= Suzanne Innes-Stubb =

British-Finnish attorney (born 1970)

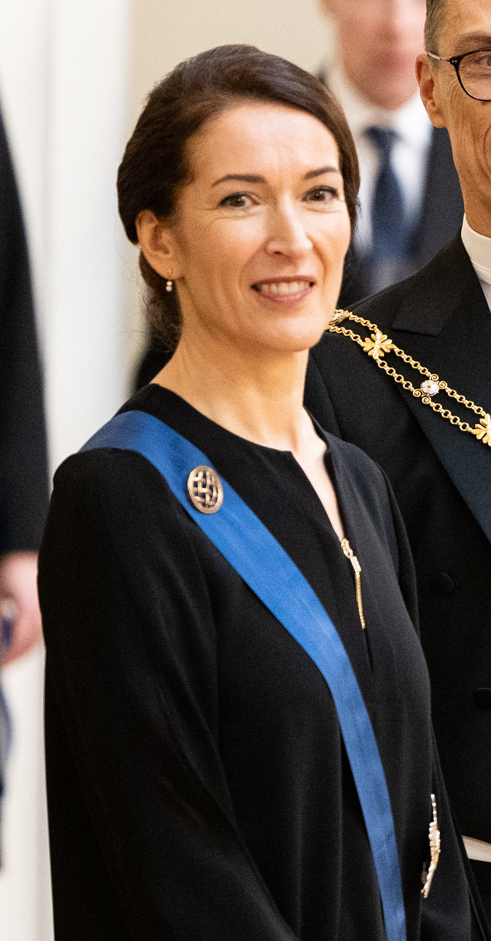
- Innes-Stubb in 2024

Spouse of the President of Finland
- Assumed role 1 March 2024
- President: Alexander Stubb
- Preceded by: Jenni Haukio

Spouse of the Prime Minister of Finland
- In role 24 June 2014 – 29 May 2015
- Prime Minister: Alexander Stubb
- Preceded by: Mervi Katainen
- Succeeded by: Minna-Maaria Sipilä

Personal details
- Born: 25 January 1970 (age 56) Solihull, Warwickshire, England
- Citizenship: United Kingdom; Finland
- Spouse: Alexander Stubb (m. 1998)
- Children: 2
- Education: Bachelor of Science (1992); Master of Laws (1995); University of Surrey; College of Europe

Suzanne Elizabeth Innes-Stubb (born 25 January 1970) is a British-Finnish attorney and the wife of Alexander Stubb, President of Finland. She is the first person of non-Finnish origin who is the spouse of the President of Finland during the presidency, while the first non-Finnish spouse of a president was Gustaf Mannerheim's first wife who was Russian. Innes-Stubb worked as Head of Global Compliance at KONE.

== Early life ==
Suzanne Innes was born in Solihull, England. Her mother is from Essex and her father is of Scottish descent. Both of her parents were teachers. Her brothers still farm their mother's family farm near Stansted Airport.

Innes studied law, French and German at the University of Surrey and graduated with a Bachelor of Science in 1992. She went on to study European Union law at the College of Europe in Bruges, Belgium. She earned her LLM degree in 1995.

== Career ==
While living in Brussels in 1999, Innes-Stubb worked for the law firm White & Case. When the family moved to Helsinki, she started working for the firm's Helsinki office.

In 2014, Innes-Stubb started working as Head of Legal for the Finnish media group Sanoma. Innes-Stubb began working for the Finnish elevator engineering company KONE as the Head of Global Compliance in 2017. In March 2024, she resigned in order to start in a new position at Aalto University starting September 2024.

== Personal life ==
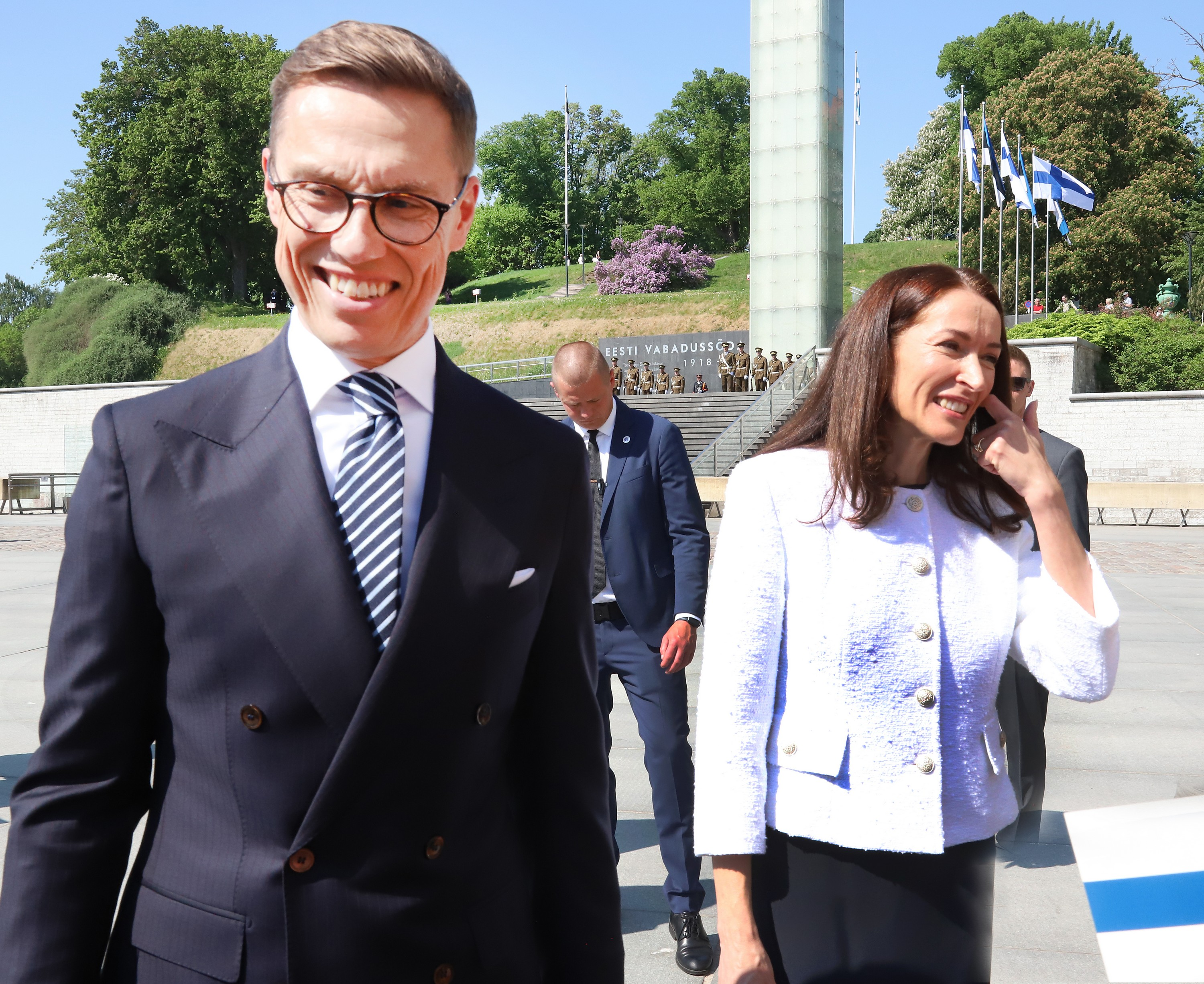
Alexander Stubb and Suzanne Innes-Stubb in 2024

Innes met Stubb in 1994 while studying law at the College of Europe in Bruges, Belgium. They were engaged in 1997 and married in 1998. The couple has two children, Emilie (born in 2001) and Oliver (born in 2004).

In addition to English, Innes-Stubb speaks French, German, Finnish, and Swedish.

== Honours ==
=== National decorations ===
- Finland: Commander Grand Cross of the Order of the White Rose of Finland (27 February 2024)

=== Foreign decorations ===
- Denmark: Dame Grand Cross of the Order of the Dannebrog (4 March 2025)
- Estonia: Member 1st Class of the Order of the Cross of Terra Mariana (23 May 2024)
- Iceland: Grand Cross of the Order of the Falcon (7 October 2025)
- Latvia: Commander Grand Cross of the Order of the Three Stars (16 September 2025)
- Luxembourg: Cross of Honour of the Order of Adolphe of Nassau (29 September 2026)
- Netherlands: Grand Cross of the Order of the Crown (11 December 2025)
- Norway: Grand Cross of the Order of Merit (15 October 2024)
- Spain: Grand Cross of the Order of Isabella the Catholic (30 September 2026)
- Sweden: Commander Grand Cross of the Royal Order of the Polar Star (23 April 2024)
- Ukraine: Member 1st Class of the Order of Princess Olga (12 September 2025)

Unofficial roles
Preceded by Jenni Haukio	Spouse of the President of Finland; 2024–present	Incumbent
