= Veikko Svinhufvud =

Finnish forester, farmer and politician (1908–1969)

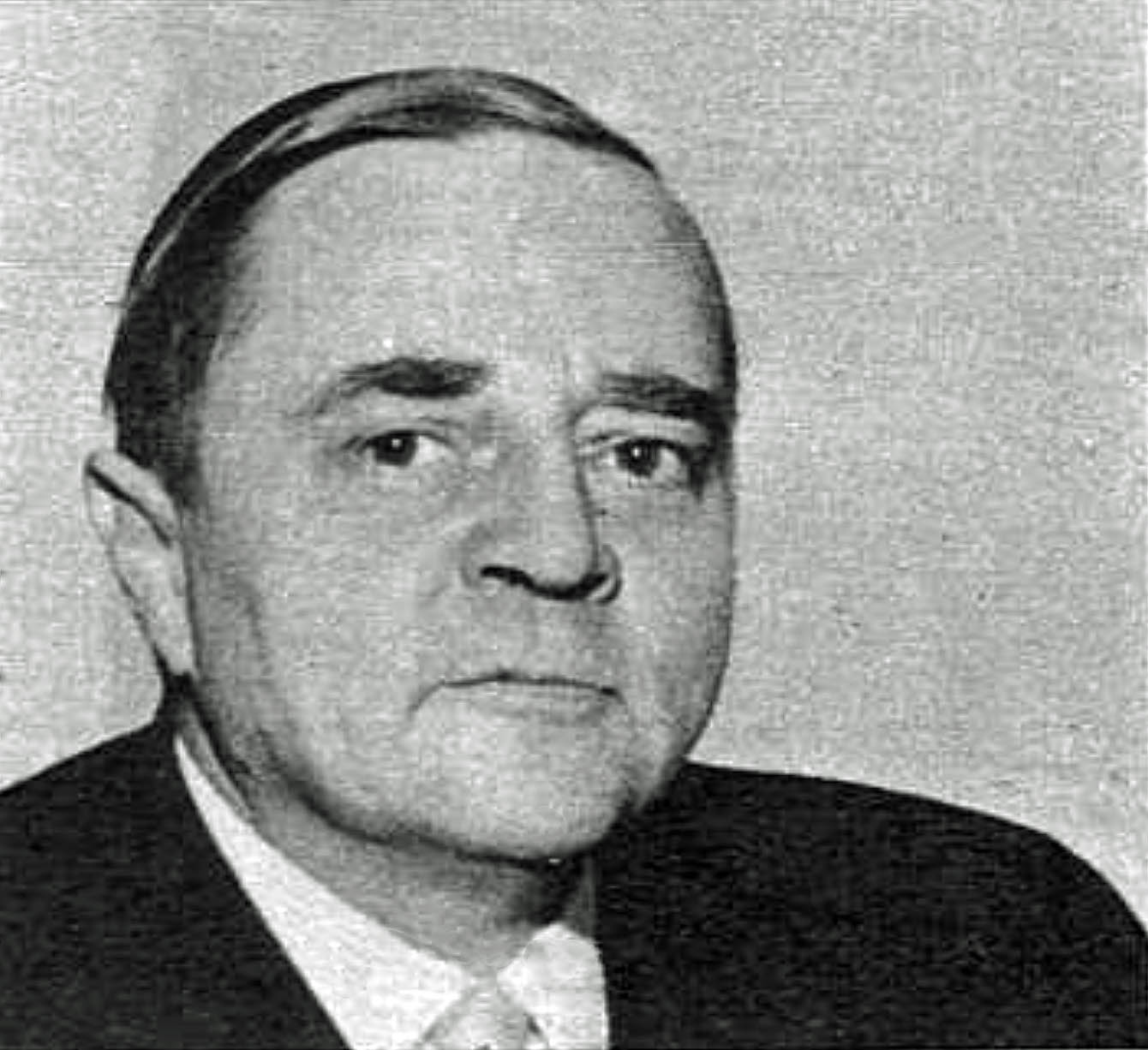
Veikko Svinhufvud in 1965

Veikko Eivind Svinhufvud (15 February 1908 – 28 February 1969) was a Finnish forester, farmer and politician, born in Heinola. He was a member of the Parliament of Finland from 1958 to 1966, representing the Agrarian League, which changed its name to Centre Party in 1965. He was a presidential elector in the 1956 and 1962 presidential elections. He was the son of President Pehr Evind Svinhufvud.
