= Pentti Arajärvi =

Finnish law academic (born 1948)

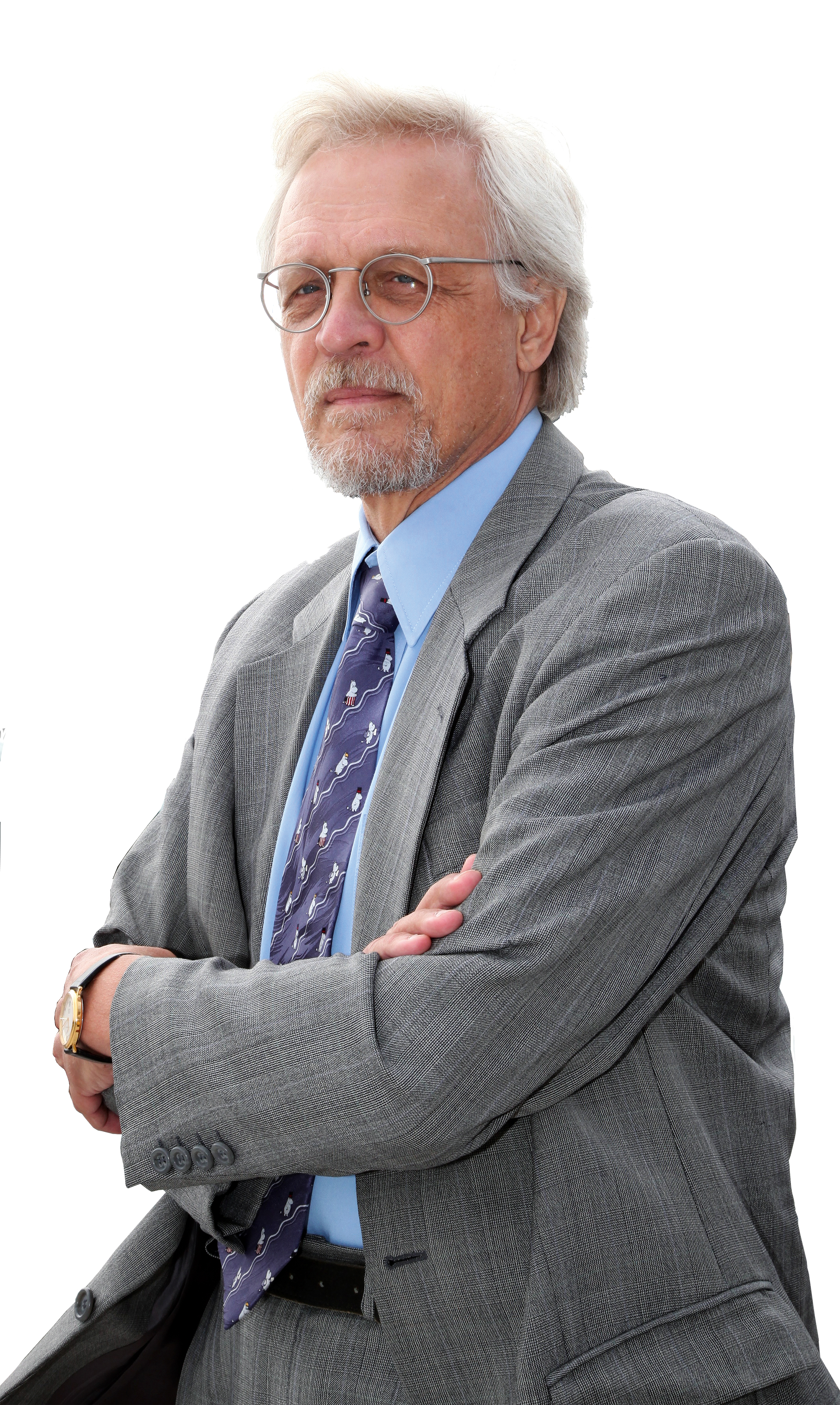
- Arajärvi in 2012

Spouse of the President of Finland
- In office 26 August 2000 – 1 March 2012
- President: Tarja Halonen
- Preceded by: Eeva Ahtisaari
- Succeeded by: Jenni Haukio

Personal details
- Born: 2 June 1948 (age 78) Helsinki, Finland
- Party: Social Democratic Party of Finland
- Spouse: Tarja Halonen (m. 2000)
- Children: 1
- Education: University of Helsinki
- Occupation: Doctor of Law

Pentti Ilkka Olavi Arajärvi (born 2 June 1948) is a Finnish Doctor of Law, Professor Emeritus and Docent of the University of Helsinki, a former civil service official and a Social Democratic politician from Helsinki. Arajärvi was awarded the honorary title of valiokuntaneuvos ("Committee Counselor") for his work in parliamentary committees. He is the spouse of Tarja Halonen, who was the President of Finland between 2000 and 2012.

Arajärvi was elected to the Helsinki City Council in the 2012 municipal elections.

== Personal life ==
On 26 August 2000, after a relationship of more than fifteen years, Arajärvi married his longtime partner, Tarja Halonen, who was at the time the President of Finland, in a civil ceremony at her official residence, Mäntyniemi. The couple has no children. Arajärvi has an adult son from a previous relationship.

Arajärvi's mother was the paediatrician and psychiatrist Terttu Arajärvi.

== Honours ==
=== National honours ===
- Finland: Grand Cross of the Order of the White Rose

=== Foreign honours ===
- Belgium: Grand Cross of the Order of the Crown
- Estonia:
  - First Class of the Order of the Cross of Terra Mariana (2000)
  - First Class of the Order of the White Star (2007)
- Iceland: Grand Cross of the Order of the Falcon
- Latvia: Commander Grand Cross of the Order of the Three Stars
- Luxembourg: Grand Cross of the Order of Adolphe of Nassau
- Portugal: Grand Cross of the Order of Prince Henry
- Sweden:
  - Commander Grand Cross of the Royal Order of the Polar Star
  - Commander 1st Class of the Royal Order of the Polar Star
