= Terttu Arajärvi =

Finnish paediatrician (1922–2014)

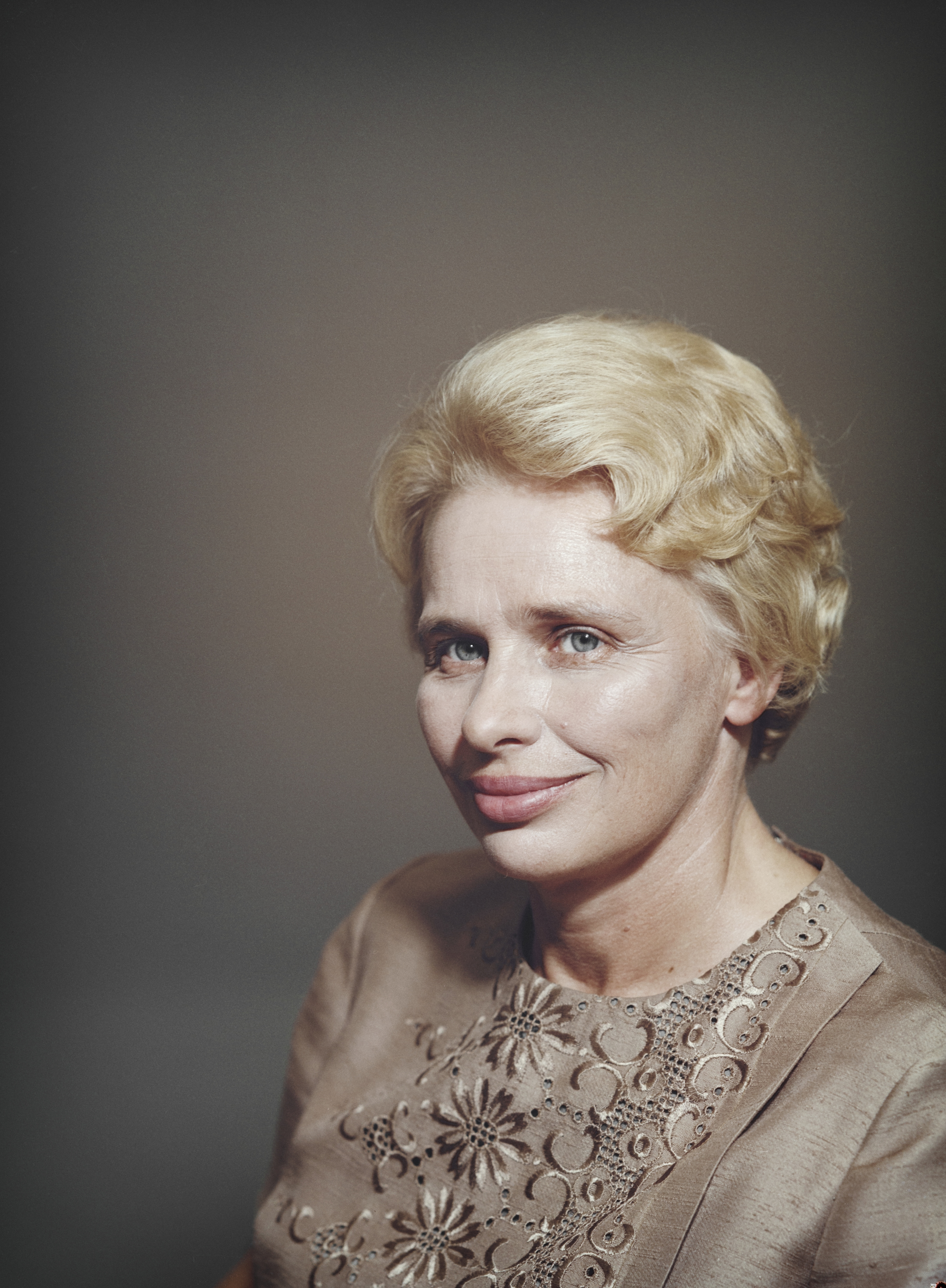
- Born: Terttu Marjatta Hanhilammi; 2 June 1922; Hausjärvi, Finland
- Died: 22 January 2014 (aged 91); Helsinki, Finland
- Occupations: Psychiatrist, professor
- Children: 4, incl. Pentti Arajärvi

Academic background
- Education: University of Helsinki
- Thesis: Microscopic investigations into the capillaries of newborn, especially premature infants (1953)

Academic work
- Discipline: Psychiatry
- Sub-discipline: Child and adolescent psychiatry
- Institutions: University of Helsinki

Terttu Arajärvi (née Hanhilammi; 2 June 1922 – 22 January 2014) was a Finnish paediatrician, notable as a pioneer and the first professor of child psychiatry in Finland.

== Education ==
Arajärvi graduated from the University of Helsinki school of medicine in 1944 specialising in paediatrics. She obtained her licenciate in 1948, and doctorate in medicine and surgery in 1953 with a thesis titled Microscopic investigations into the capillaries of newborn, especially premature infants.

However, she failed to secure a paediatrics post at the university, which she herself attributed to being a woman, and consequently decided to retrain in the emerging field of child psychiatry instead.

== Career ==
Arajärvi worked in a broad range of clinical and policy roles in children's healthcare and medicine, as well as in areas of parenting advisory and education.

She served at the Lastenlinna children's hospital, part of the Helsinki University Central Hospital, for over thirty years from 1954 until 1985, the last 12 of which as its Chief of Medicine.

In her later career Arajärvi held a number of senior advisory positions with the government of Finland, and took an active role in many Finnish and international professional bodies, including vice-presidency of the Union of European Paedopsychiatrists (now the European Society for Child and Adolescent Psychiatry).

She published over 60 scientific papers, as well as several academic and popular books in the fields of child health, psychiatry and psychology, and parenting.

== Personal life ==
Terttu Hanhilammi married the lawyer Tauno Arajärvi in 1947, and the couple had four children, the eldest of whom is the professor of law emeritus Pentti Arajärvi.
