= Ester Ståhlberg =

First Lady of Finland (1870–1950)

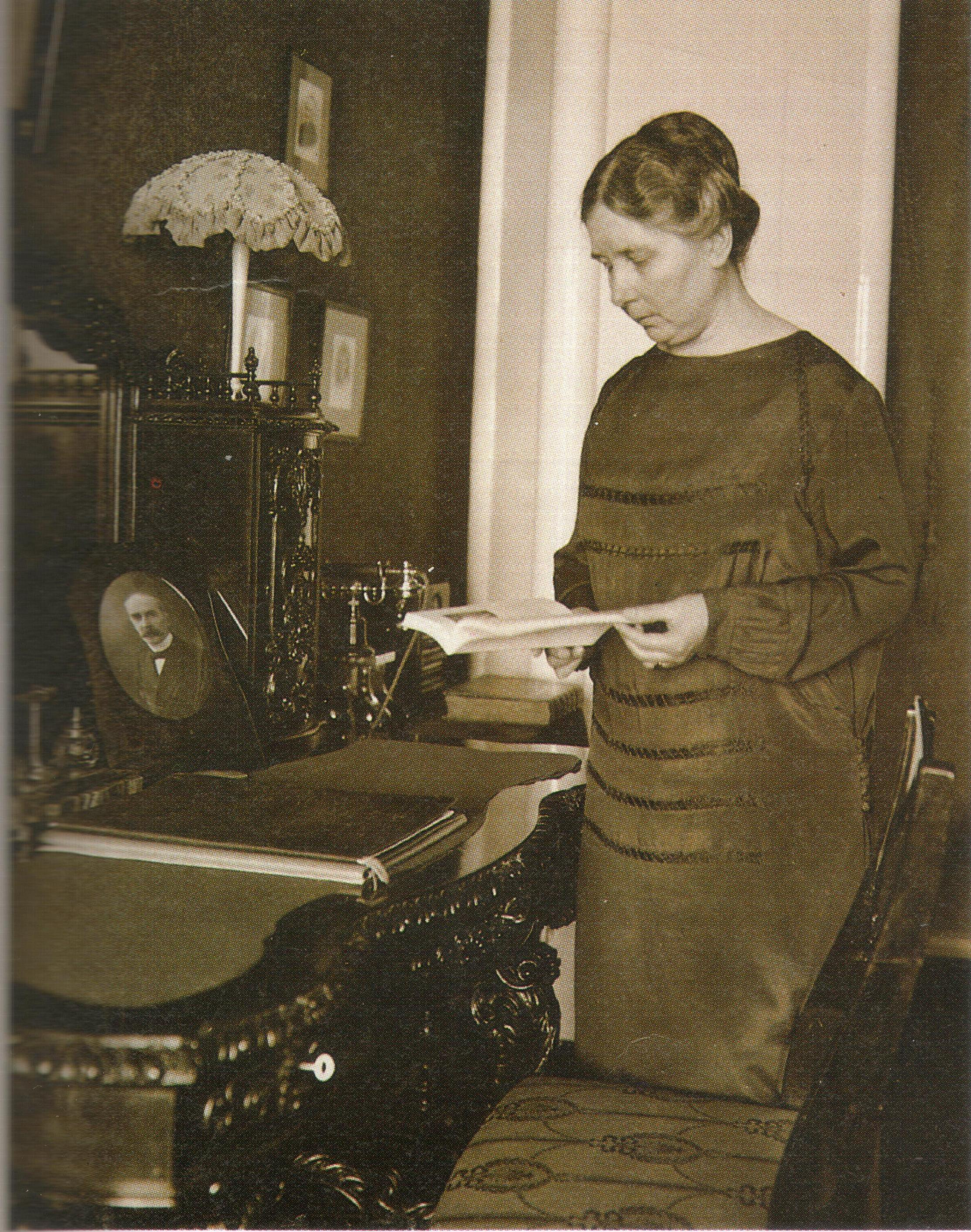
- Born: February 17, 1870 Vaasa, Finland
- Died: July 21, 1950 (aged 80) Helsinki, Finland

Ester Ståhlberg, née Elfving (February 17, 1870 – July 21, 1950) was a Finnish writer and educator and the first First Lady of Finland. She was the wife of president Kaarlo Juho Ståhlberg.

The daughter of Karl Oskar Elfving, mayor, and Jenny Nyman, she was born Ester Elfving in Vaasa, went on to study in Oulu and then continued with post-graduate studies in Helsinki. For a time, she taught Swedish.

After the death of her first husband in 1917, she was named to the child welfare department of the Finnish Ministry of Social Affairs.

From 1912 to 1919, Ståhlberg served on the editorial board of Valvoja magazine. She was editor of Aamu magazine from 1926 to 1931.

She also published novels and biographies, including a biography of Mathilda Wrede.

In 1922, she founded Koteja kodittomille lapsille ("Home for Homeless Children"), later known as Pelastakaa Lapset ("Save the Children").

Ståhlberg was married twice: first to Karl Hällström, a pharmacist, who died in 1917. In 1920, she married the widower Kaarlo Juho Ståhlberg, during his term as the first President of Finland.

She died in Helsinki.
