= Tellervo Koivisto =

Finnish politician (born 1929)

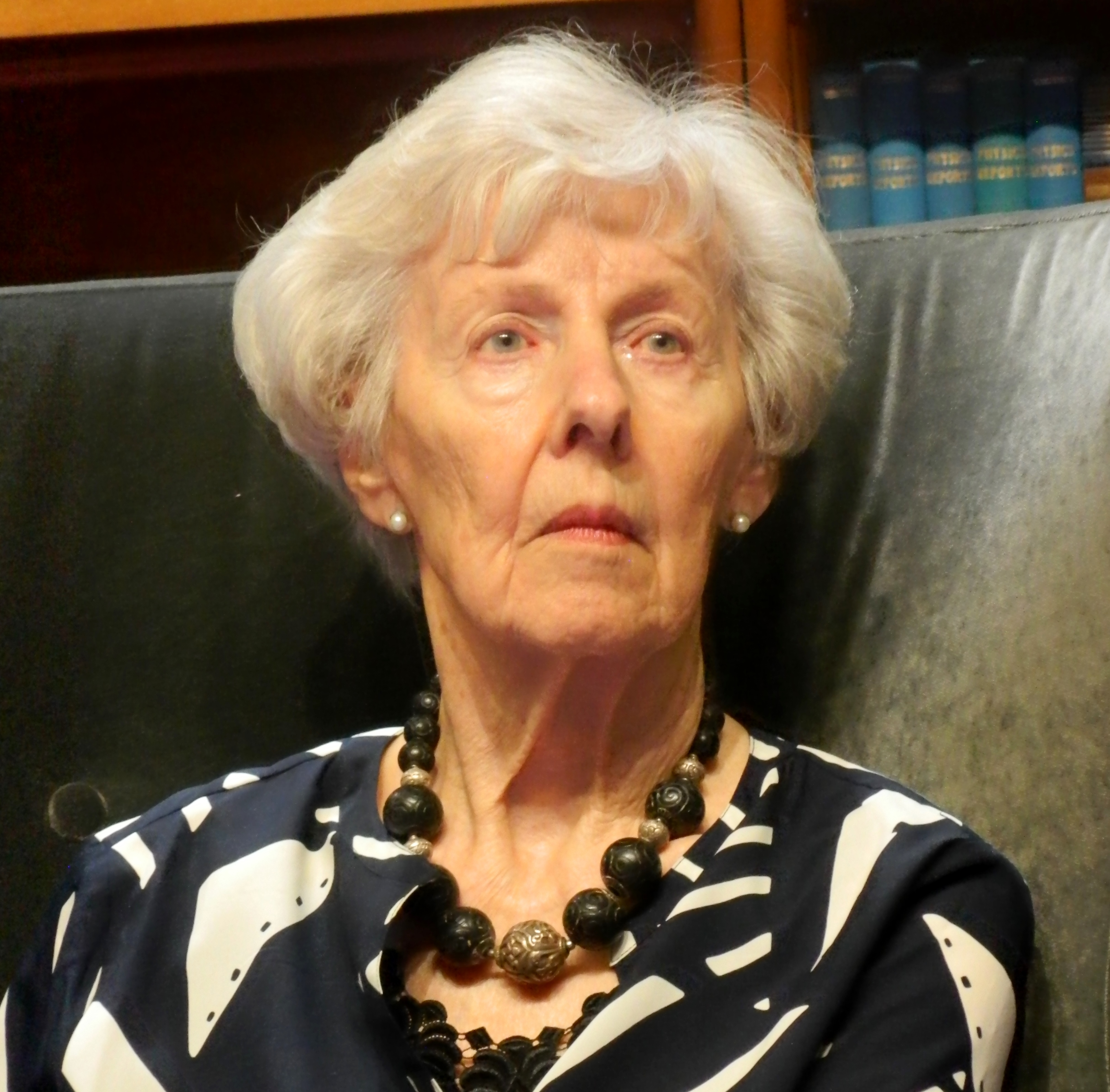
- Koivisto in 2017

Spouse of the President of Finland
- In role 27 January 1982 – 1 March 1994
- President: Mauno Koivisto
- Preceded by: Sylvi Kekkonen
- Succeeded by: Eeva Ahtisaari

Personal details
- Born: Taimi Tellervo Kankaanranta; 2 January 1929 (age 97) Punkalaidun, Finland
- Spouse: Mauno Koivisto (m. 1952; died 2017)
- Education: Turku School of Economics (1953)
- Occupation: Bachelor of Economics

Taimi Tellervo Koivisto (née Kankaanranta; born 2 January 1929) is a Finnish politician who was First Lady of Finland from 1982 to 1994 as the wife of president Mauno Koivisto. She also served as a member of the Finnish parliament, representing the Social Democratic Party of Finland.

== Life ==
Tellrvo was born to a farmer's family in the Western Finnish municipality Punkalaidun, in the Satakunta region. After finishing the primary school, Koivisto went to a high school in Huittinen, where she graduated in 1949. Koivisto entered the Turku School of Economics, and met her future husband in Turku in December 1950. She was married to Mauno Koivisto on 22 June 1952. In 1953, Koivisto graduated from the Turku School of Economics and worked as a teacher since 1954. In 1957, she became a housewife, when her daughter Assi was born. Assi was later voted into the electoral college during the 1982 presidential election.

In the late 1960s and the early 1970s Koivisto was active in the feminist organization Yhdistys 9, and worked as a columnist for the news magazine Suomen Kuvalehti 1968–1972. She became a member of the Finnish parliament in the 1972 election, but withdrew from parliament after one season and ran for the City Council of Helsinki in 1976. During her husband's presidential term, Koivisto was more focused on social issues and charity work than on her ceremonial position of the First Lady.

In her 1999 autobiography Koivisto wrote openly of her depression which was launched at the age of 70 by her childhood memories of school bullying. On her 90th birthday, Koivisto told about the mistreatment she had experienced during her school years. She was abused by the local priest who was her religion teacher. Koivisto was spanked on her bare buttocks, and the priest made questions of her periods. Koivisto described his behaviour as "sadistic". Inspired by the Me Too movement, Koivisto also told about the sexual harassment she had experienced in the Finnish parliament.

On 25 December 2020, Koivisto was hospitalized after falling at her home which resulted in her breaking her hip.

== Gallery ==
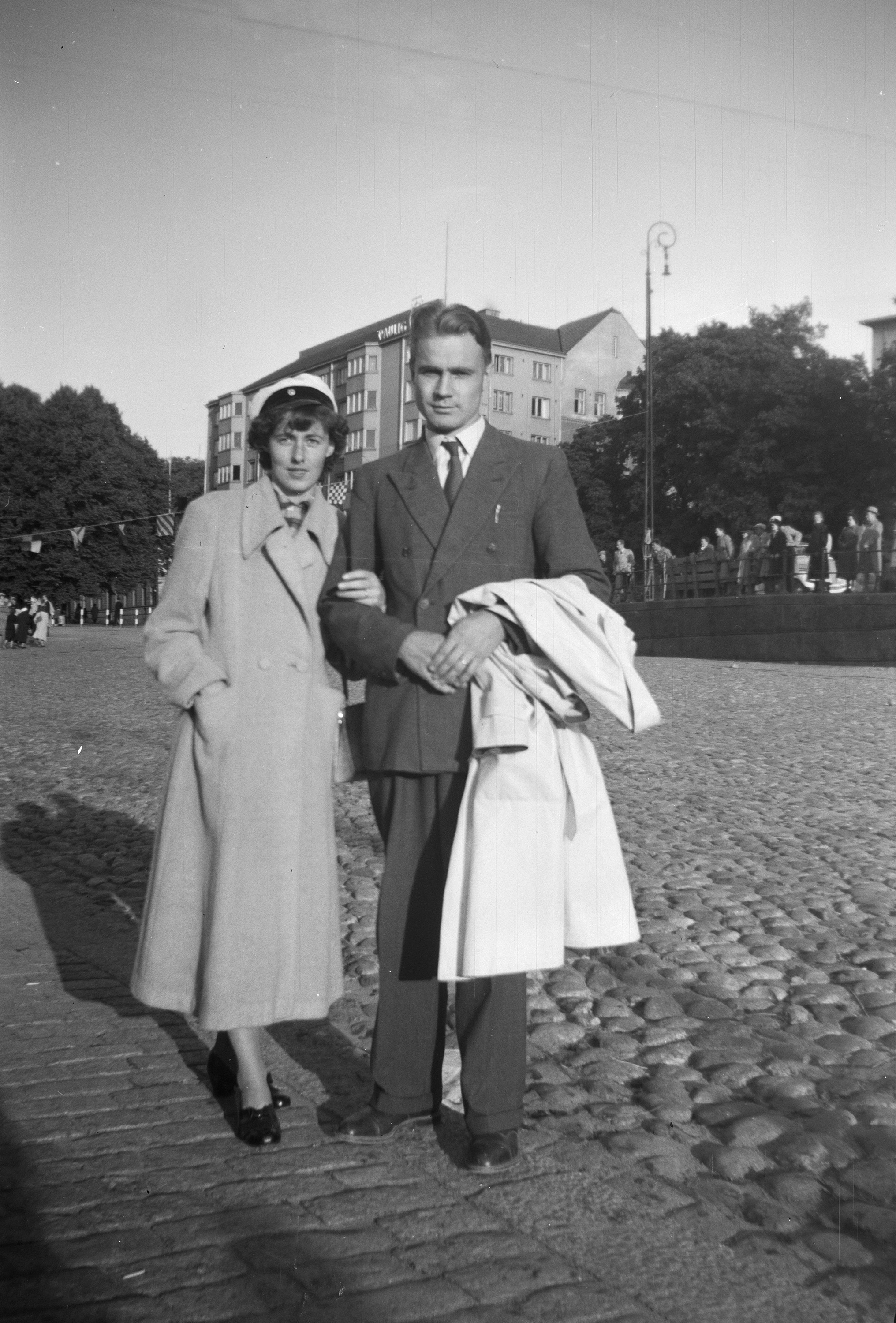
Tellervo Koivisto and Mauno Koivisto in 1950s

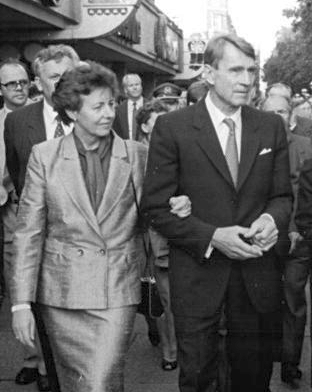
Tellervo Koivisto with Mauno Koivisto, the president of Finland in Dresden, German Democratic Republic (30 September 1987)

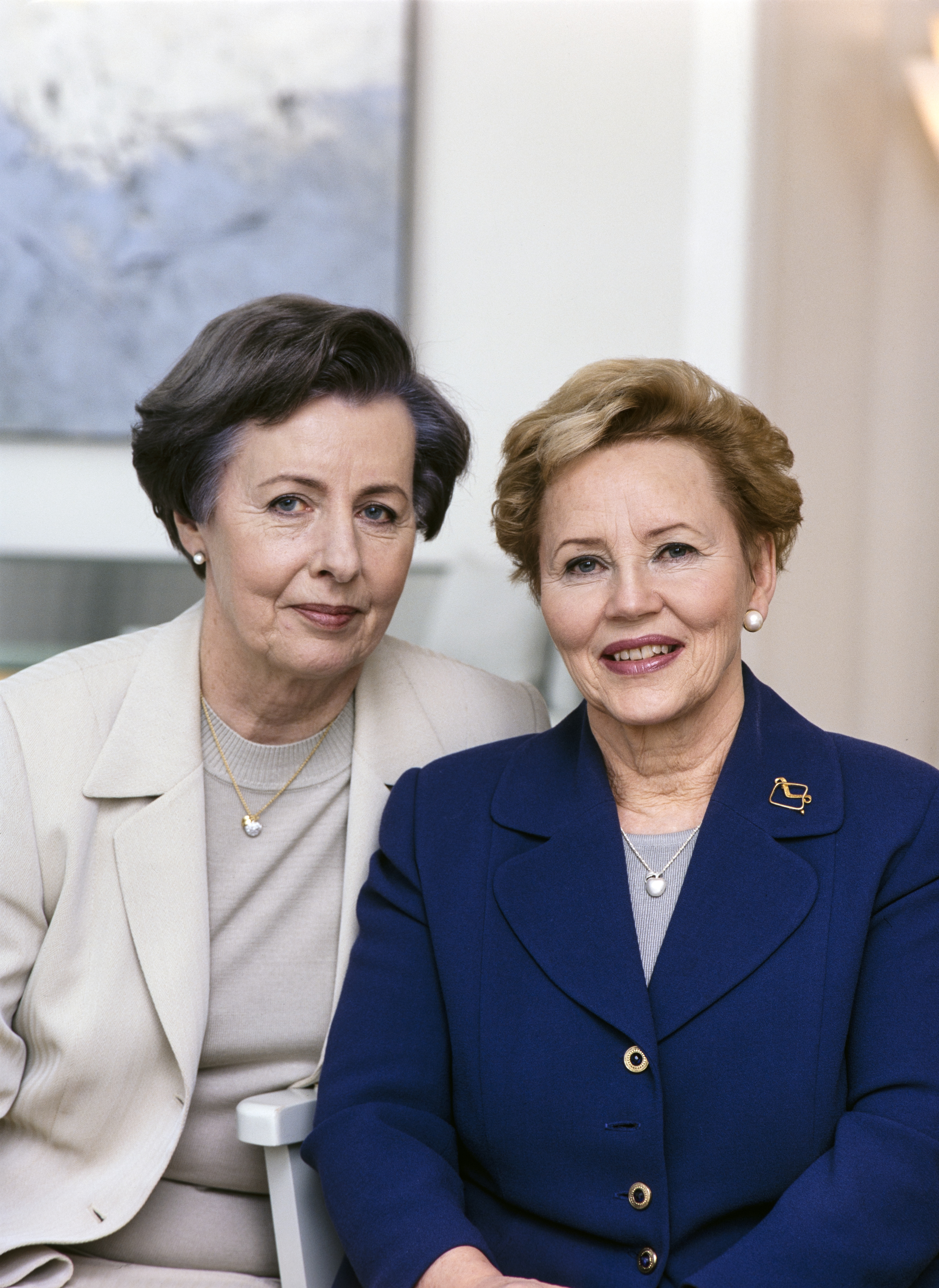
Tellervo Koivisto and Eeva Ahtisaari in 2000

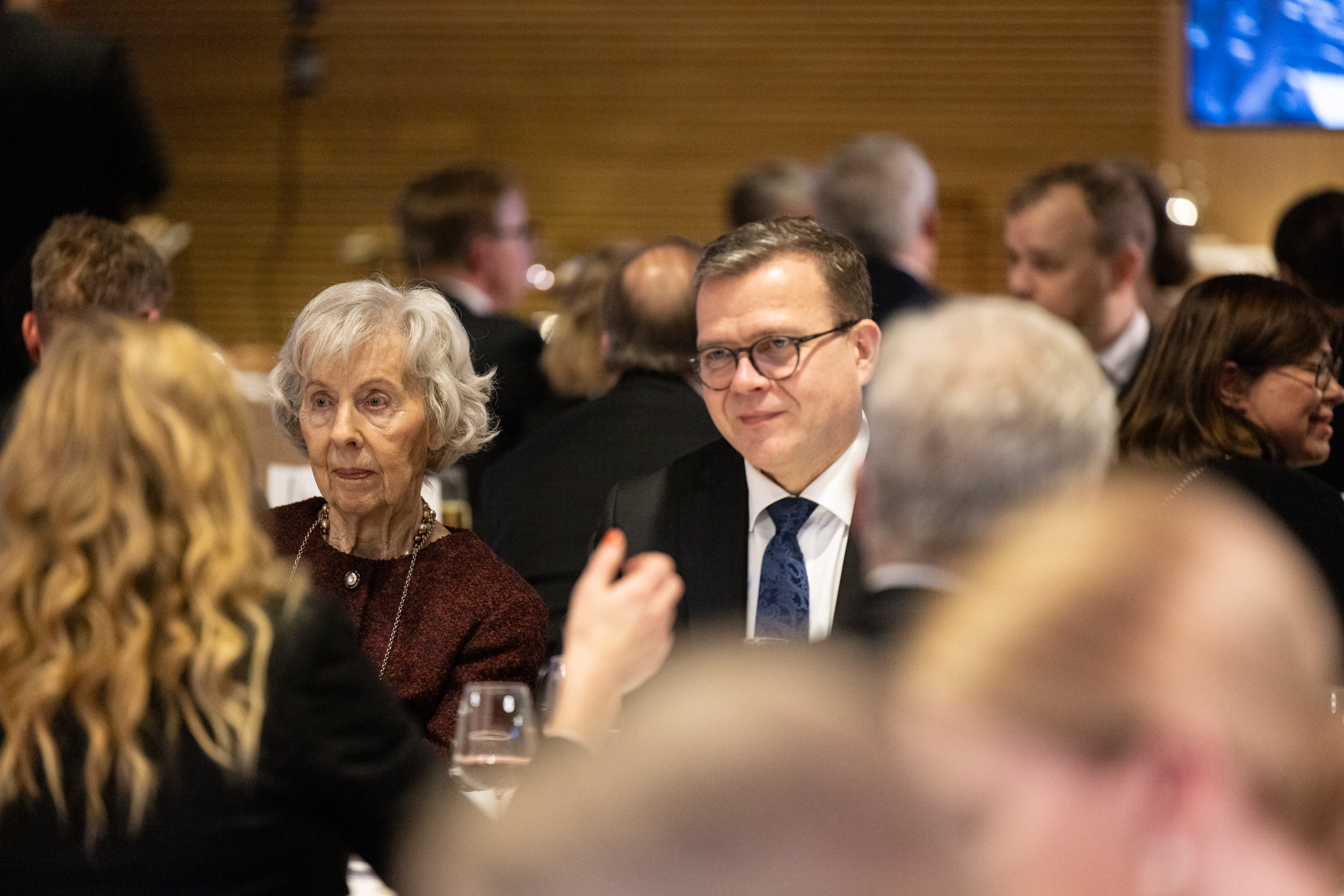
Tellervo Koivisto and Petteri Orpo in 2023

== Honours ==
=== National honour ===
- Grand Cross of the Order of the White Rose of Finland
- (Finland) Grand Cross of the Order of the Holy Lamb

=== Foreign honours ===
- Estonia: First Class of the Order of the Cross of Terra Mariana
- Norway: Grand Cross of the Order of St. Olav
- Portugal: Grand Cross of the Order of Prince Henry
- Sweden: Member Grand Cross of the Royal Order of the Polar Star

== Literary works ==
- Elämän siivellä: Päiväkirjan lehtiä, Helsinki; Kirjayhtymä, 1970.
- Päiväkirjan uudet sivut, Helsinki; Otava, 1999. ISBN 978-951-11642-6-5
