= Relander =

Relander is a surname. Notable people with the surname include:

- Allan Ferdinand Relander (1901–1990), Finnish seafarer
- Andreas Relander (1829–1902), Finnish Active State Councillor
- Anna Inkeri Relander (1888–1945), Finnish writer
- Artur Relander (1862–1934), Finnish politician
- Arvo Relander (1936–2012), Finnish doctor
- Bertha Relander (1866–1942), Finnish music teacher
- Einar Relander (1876–1964), Finnish dentist, musician, and author
- Erik Relander (1937–2011), Finnish historian
- Erika Relander (1879–1937), Finnish painter and teacher
- Evald Relander (1856–1926), Finnish agronomist; father of Lauri Kristian Relander
- Felix Fridolf Relander (1864–1925), Finnish Bishop
- Hugo Relander (1865–1947), Finnish mathematician and politician
- Ilmari Relander (businessman) (1910–1997), Finnish businessman
- Ilmari Relander (colonel) (1894–1932), Finnish colonel
- Jukka Relander (born 1967), Finnish bureaucrat
- Kaj-Erik Relander, Finnish businessman and investor
- Karl Konrad Relander, birth name of Konrad ReijoWaara (1853–1936), Finnish health educator
- Lauri Kristian Relander (1883–1942), Finnish politician and 2nd President of Finland
- Oskar Relander (1863–1930), Finnish pedagogue and scholar
- Ragnar Relander (1910–1970), Finnish painter
- Ritva Lehtelä-Relander (1939–2015), Finnish pianist
- Robin Relander (died 2019), Finnish actor
- Signe Relander (1886–1962), wife of Lauri Kristian Relander
- Sven Relander (1897–1956), Finnish actor
- Tauno Relander (1892–1977), Finnish physician and genealogist
- Timo Relander (1931–2016), Finnish politician

== See also ==
- Rylander
