= Ragnar Relander =

Finnish painter (1910–1970)

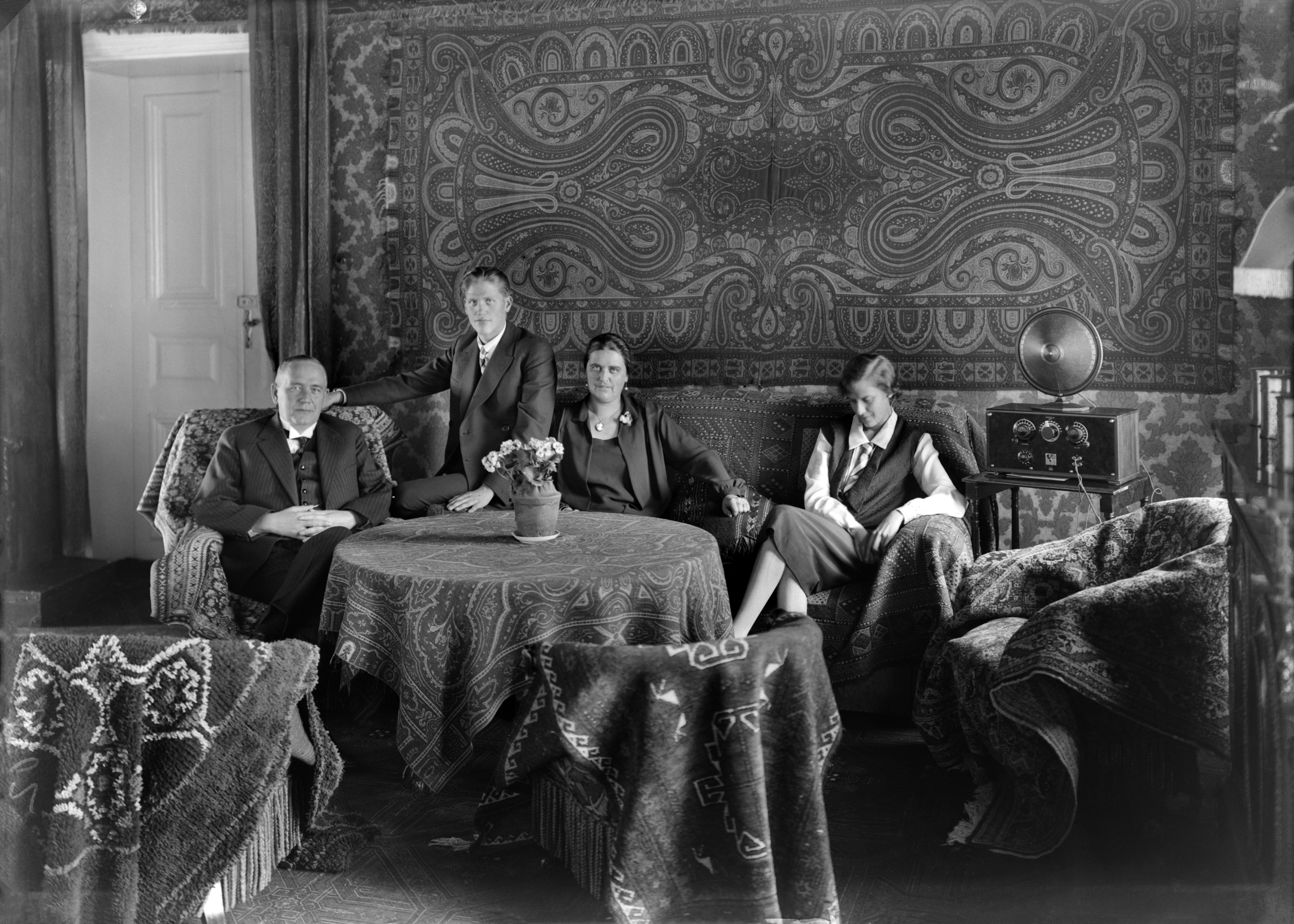
- Ragnar (second to left) with his parents and sister at the Helsinki Presidential Palace in 1928
- Born: Ragnar Olavi Kristian Relander; August 10, 1910
- Died: August 26, 1970 (aged 60)
- Occupation: Painter
- Parent(s): Lauri Kristian Relander; Signe Relander

Ragnar Olavi Kristian Relander (August 10, 1910 – August 26, 1970) was a Finnish painter and the son of Lauri Kristian Relander, the second president of Finland.

== Biography ==
Relander was born in 1910 to Lauri Kristian Relander, who at the time was an agricultural researcher for the Finnish government, and Signe Relander. He also had a sister, Maja-Lisa.

In 1930, Relander graduated from the Helsinki Finnish Private Lyceum, and studied from 1931 to 1934 at the Academy of Fine Arts, Helsinki, followed by the Académie de la Grande Chaumière from 1937 to 1938. His first art exhibition was in Helsinki in 1931.

Among his works include the 1961 Savings Bank medal, which features his father on the obverse.

Relander died in 1970.
