= Evald Relander =

Finnish teacher and bank manager (1856–1926)

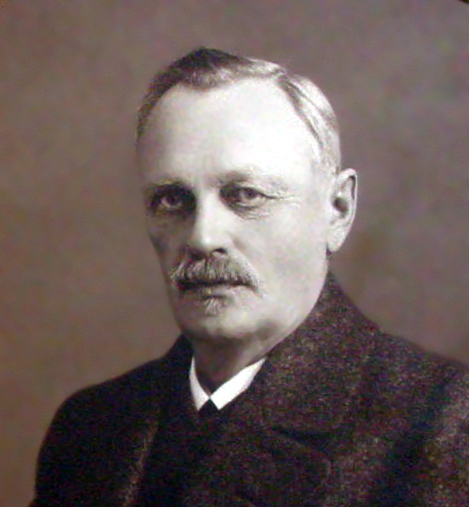
- Born: Ewald Kristian Relander; 7 January 1856; Vyborg, Grand Duchy of Finland
- Died: 9 October 1926 (aged 70); Vyborg, Finland
- Occupations: Teacher; rector; banker
- Title: Maanviljelysneuvos ("agricultural councillor")
- Spouse(s): Gertrud Maria Olsoni (m. 1882–1898) Wilhelmina Kihl (m. 1900)
- Children: 5, including Lars Kristian

Evald Kristian Relander (January 7, 1856 – October 9, 1926) was a Finnish teacher and banker who received the title of agricultural councillor (maanviljelysneuvos). His son was Lauri Kristian Relander, the second President of the Republic of Finland.

Relander's parents were chaplain Erik Kristian Relander (1812–1877) and Maria Wilhelmina Wahlberg (1822–1904). Relander attended six grades of middle school in Joensuu, but then went to study at a business college in Turku. After graduating, he worked as an assistant teacher and accountant at an agricultural school in Kurkijoki. However, after studying in Mustiala, he graduated as an agronomist. After working as both a teacher and school principal in Kurkijoki, Relander moved to Elisenvaara in 1897 as a teacher and principal. Relander held, among other things, several positions of trust and organization, and he also served as the manager of the Elisenvaara branch of the Kansallis-Osake-Pankki from 1916. Relander, who retired in 1921, received the title of agricultural councillor in 1920. He died in Vyborg in 1926.

Evald Relander became the first father to see his child become president of the republic; the next time this happened was not until 2024, when Göran Stubb saw his son Alexander Stubb take the oath of office.
