= President of Finland =

Head of state

President of the Republic of Finland
- Suomen tasavallan presidentti (Finnish); Republiken Finlands president (Swedish)
- Presidential Standard

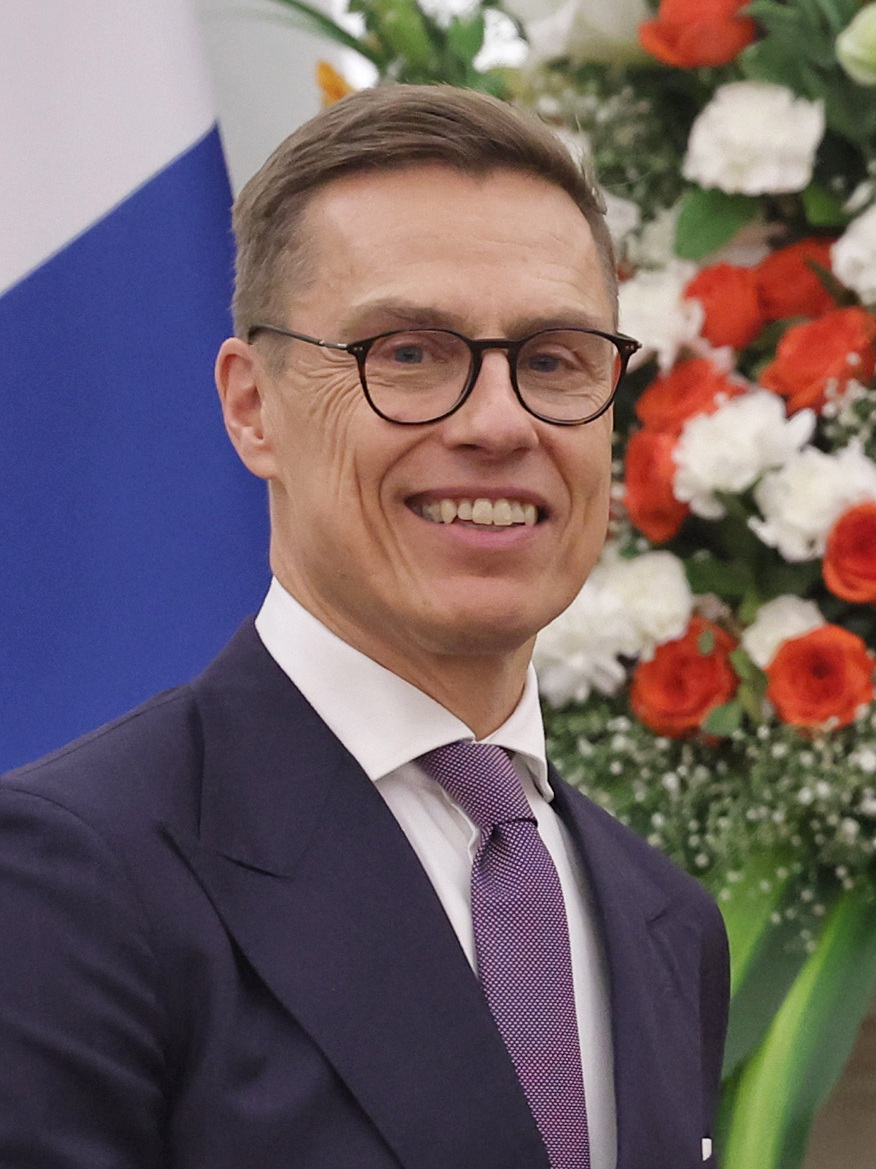
- Incumbent; Alexander Stubb since 1 March 2024
- Executive branch of the Finnish Government; Office of the President of Finland
- Style: Mr. President of the Republic (informal); His Excellency (diplomatic)
- Type: Head of state; Commander-in-chief
- Residence: Presidential Palace (ceremonial); Mäntyniemi (residential); Kultaranta (summer residence)
- Appointer: Direct election
- Term length: Six years, renewable once consecutively
- Constituting instrument: Constitution of Finland (2000)
- Inaugural holder: Kaarlo Juho Ståhlberg
- Formation: 26 July 1919; 107 years ago
- Deputy: Prime Minister of Finland
- Salary: €160,000 annually
- Website: President of the Republic of Finland

Björneborgarnas marsch (MID)
"March of the Björneborgers" or "March of the Pori Regiment" from the 19th century; known as the Song of the President of Finland

The president of the Republic of Finland (Finnish: Suomen tasavallan presidentti; Swedish: republiken Finlands president) is the head of state of Finland. The incumbent president is Alexander Stubb, since 1 March 2024. He was elected president for the first time in 2024.

The president is directly elected by universal suffrage for a term of six years. Since 1994, no president may be elected for more than two consecutive terms. The president must be a natural-born Finnish citizen. The presidential office was established in the Constitution Act of 1919. Under the Constitution of Finland, executive power is vested in the Finnish Government and the president, with the latter possessing only residual powers. Only formally, the president ranks first in the protocol, before the speaker of the parliament and the prime minister of Finland.

Finland has for most of its independence had a semi-presidential system in which the president had much authority and power over both foreign and domestic policy, but constitutional amendments adopted in 1991, 2000 and 2012 reduced the president's powers and moved the country towards a more parliamentary system. The president still leads the nation's foreign policy in conjunction with the Government, and is the commander-in-chief of the Finnish Defence Forces.

== Election and term ==
=== Election ===
The president is elected by direct popular vote. Candidates can be nominated by registered political parties that won at least one seat in the previous parliamentary elections. Alternatively, a candidate may also be nominated by 20,000 enfranchised citizens. It is common practice for each political party to set its own, distinct candidate.

If only one candidate is nominated, that candidate becomes president without an election. Otherwise, the first round of balloting takes place on the fourth Sunday of January in the election year. The elections are two-staged. If one of the candidates receives more than half of the votes cast, that candidate is elected president. If no candidate wins a majority in the first stage, the top two candidates compete in a second round two weeks later. The candidate who then receives more votes is elected. In the event of a tie, the outcome is determined by lot. The Government confirms the outcome and, if necessary, conducts the drawing of lots. The president assumes office on the first day of the month following the election.

=== History ===
Between 1925 and 1988, the president was elected indirectly by an electoral college made up of electors chosen by voters in the presidential election. In the 1988 presidential election, a direct and an indirect election were conducted in parallel: if no candidate could gain a majority, the president was elected by an electoral college formed in the same elections. Since 1994, the president has been elected by a direct popular vote.

Several exceptional presidential elections have been held:

- 1919, the first president, K. J. Ståhlberg, was elected by the Finnish Parliament under the transitional provision of the constitution that had just come into force.
- 1940, President Kyösti Kallio announced his resignation and the electors, who were voted for the 1937 presidential election, also elected Prime Minister Risto Ryti as president for Kallio's unused term (a little over two years until 1943), because electoral college elections could not be held during the martial law that began with the Winter War.
- 1943, the president (Ryti again) was also elected by the 1937 electors, exceptionally for a term of only two years, because of the Continuation War.
- 1944, Ryti announced his resignation and as the Continuation War continued, the Parliament, by an emergency law, appointed the Commander-in-Chief of the Finnish Armed Forces, Marshal of Finland Gustaf Mannerheim as president for a six-year term.
- 1946, Mannerheim announced his resignation and, as the martial law was still in effect, Parliament elected Prime Minister J. K. Paasikivi as President for Mannerheim's unused term (almost four years until 1950).
- 1973, a emergency law enacted by Parliament – although there was no state of emergency in Finland – extended President Urho Kekkonen's third term, which had begun in 1968, by four years (from 1974 to 1978).
- 1981, Kekkonen announced his resignation almost two and a half years before the end of his (fourth) term and Prime Minister Mauno Koivisto was elected as his successor normally by the electors and for a six-year term in 1982.

==== Inauguration ====
The president-elect, accompanied by the Speaker of the Parliament and the outgoing president, assumes office on the first day of the month following the election by making a solemn affirmation in both Finnish and Swedish at a ceremony in Parliament House. The affirmation is specified in Section 56 of the Constitution, and in English reads "I, [N. N.], elected by the people of Finland as the President of the Republic, hereby affirm that in my presidential duties I shall sincerely and conscientiously observe the Constitution and the laws of the Republic, and to the best of my ability promote the wellbeing of the people of Finland."

The term of the president-elect begins at the moment the affirmation has been made (around 12:20 on the day of the inauguration). After the inauguration, the new president, accompanied by their predecessor, inspects the guard of honour outside Parliament House.

==== Incapacity and succession ====
The president of Finland does not have a vice president. If the president is temporarily prevented from performing their duties, such as due to an international trip from where they are unable to return quickly during a time when such may be required, the prime minister serves as acting president until the president's incapacity ceases. If the president dies in office or if the Government declares that the president is permanently unable to carry out the duties of office, a new election is triggered to determine a successor. If the prime minister is unavailable, the duties are carried out by the minister deputising for the prime minister.

==== Impeachment ====
If the chancellor of justice, the parliamentary ombudsman or the Government deem that the president is guilty of treason or high treason, or crimes against humanity, the matter shall be communicated to Parliament. If Parliament, by three-fourths of the votes cast, decides that charges are to be brought, the Prosecutor-General prosecutes the president in the High Court of Impeachment and the president abstains from office for the duration of the proceedings. There is, however, no mechanism laid out in the Constitution or other laws for removing a president from office.

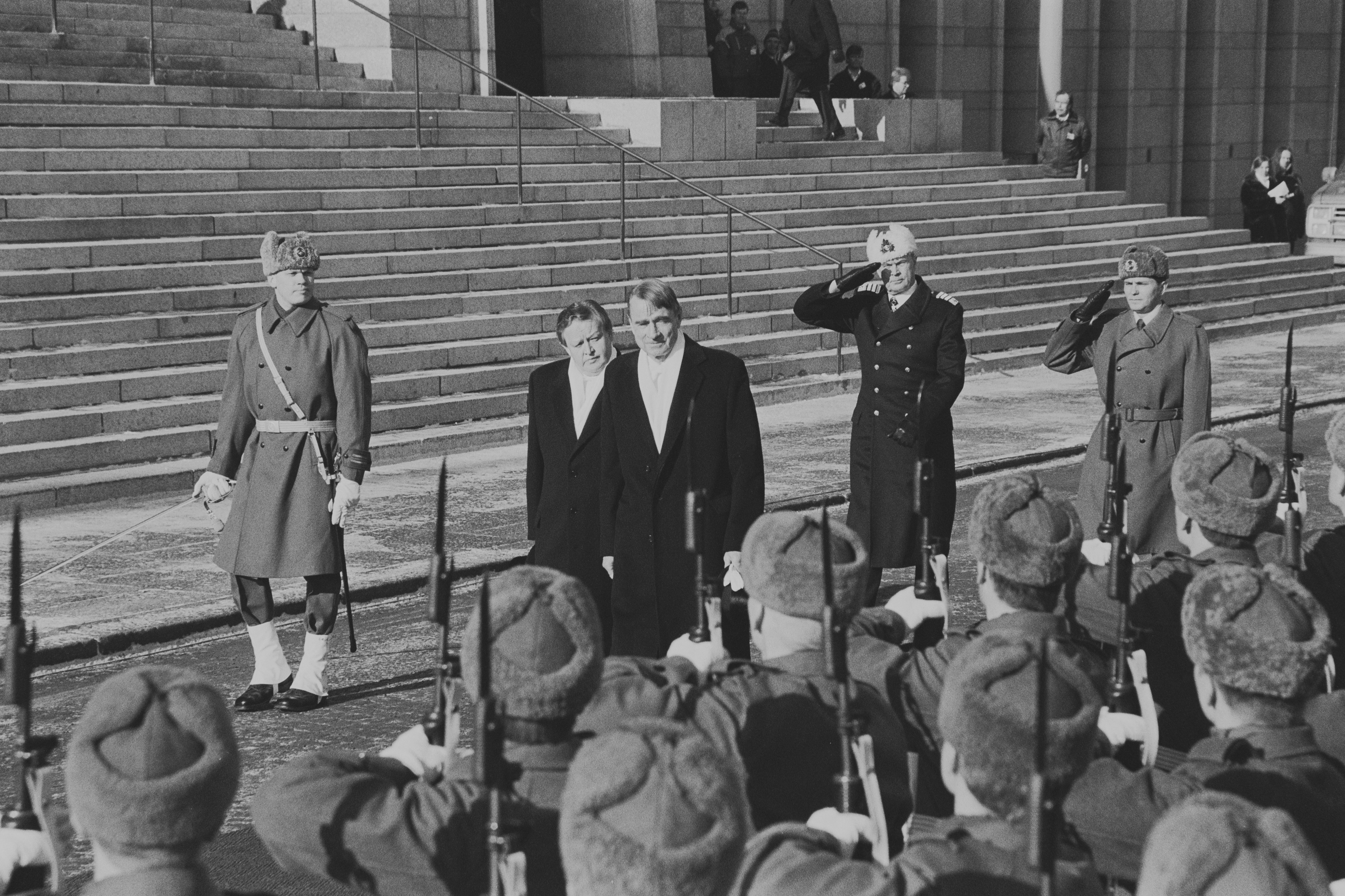
Newly sworn President Martti Ahtisaari (2nd left) inspects the company of honor with outgoing President Koivisto (c.), followed by others, c. 1994

== Duties and powers ==
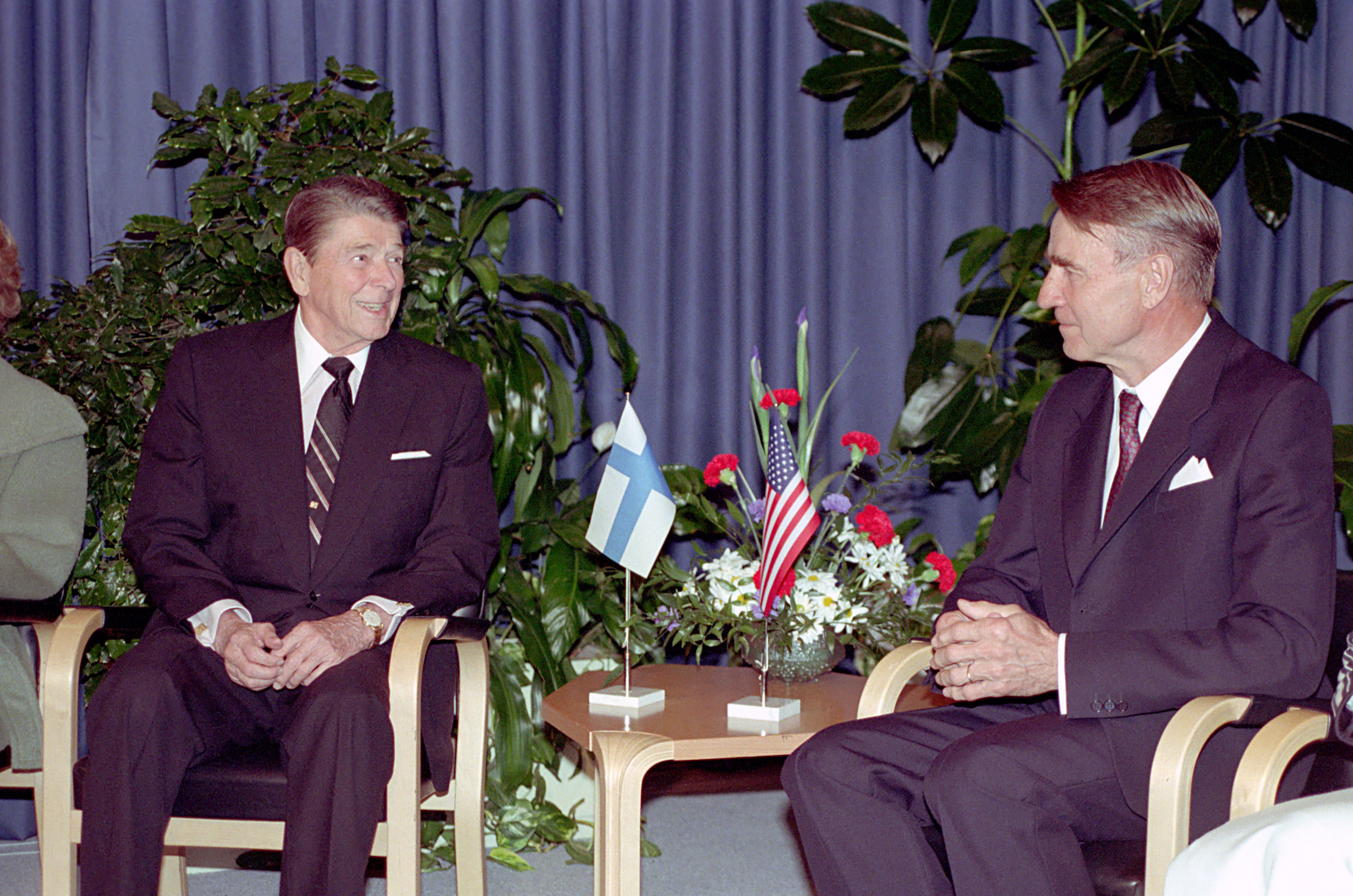
Mauno Koivisto with President Ronald Reagan during a trip to Finland

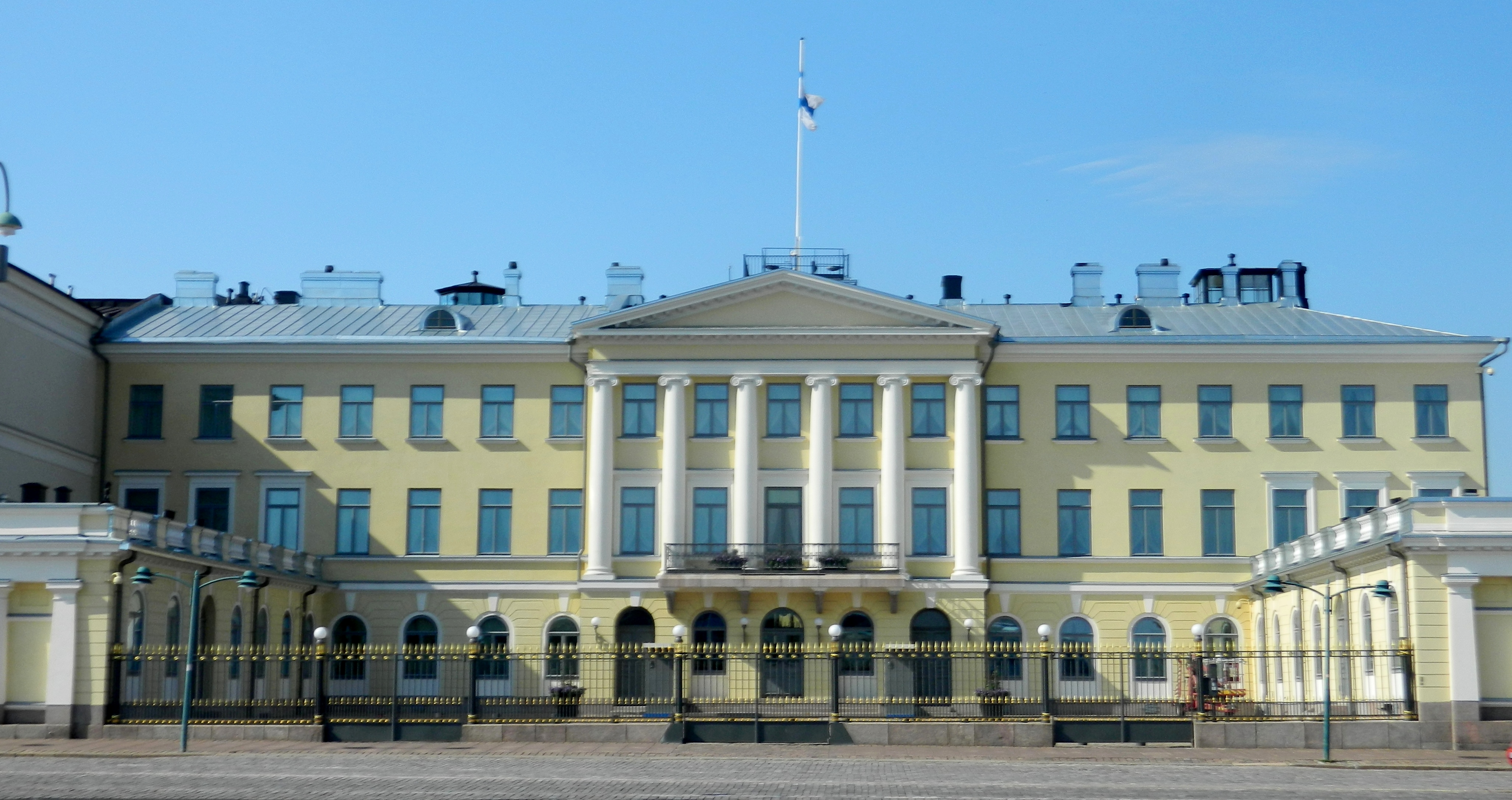
The Presidential Palace, Helsinki is the official state residence of the president

The president's functions and powers are directly defined in the Constitution. In addition to those specified there, the president also discharges functions assigned to the president in other laws. Under the Constitution of Finland, executive power is vested in the president and the Government, which must enjoy the confidence of parliament. This principle is reflected in other provisions of the constitution concerning the president's functions and powers dealing with legislation, decrees, and appointment of public officials. Custom dictates that the president renounces any party affiliation while serving, to remain above day-to-day politics.

The president exercises governmental powers "in council" with the Finnish Government, echoing the royal curia regis. The session is customarily arranged once a week. There is quorum of five ministers and the chancellor of justice is present as well. In the session, the respective ministers present the topic and a proposal for decision. Based on the proposal, the president makes his decision. The president may depart from the proposal and may return the proposal to the Government for reconsideration. There is no voting and normally there are no speeches aside from the aforementioned proposals. Except for approvals of new laws and appointments, the Government may present the issue to the Parliament, which will make the final decision on the matter on the Government's proposal.

The president was originally vested with fairly broad executive power, particularly in the realm of foreign policy. Constitutional amendments enacted in 1999 reduced the president's powers somewhat, and the president now shares executive authority with the Prime Minister. Nevertheless, presidents are still seen as providing a measure of stability, given that it is all but impossible for one party to win an outright majority in Parliament.

=== Ordering premature parliamentary elections ===
Upon the proposal of the prime minister, the president may, having consulted the parliamentary groups and while Parliament is in session, order the holding of premature parliamentary election. The new parliament is chosen for a normal four-year term. Parliament itself may decide when to end its session before the election day. From 1919 to 1991 the president's power to order a premature election was unqualified and he could do so whenever considered necessary. Presidents have ordered premature parliamentary elections on seven occasions. The president declares each annual session of parliament open and closes the last Annual Session. This is done in a speech at each opening and closing ceremony.

=== Emergency powers ===
Under the Preparedness Act, in exceptional circumstances the president may issue a decree authorising the government to exercise emergency powers for up to one year at a time. The decree must be submitted to Parliament for its approval. Should the powers available under the Preparedness Act prove inadequate in an emergency, additional powers can be assumed under the State of Defence Act. The president may declare a state of defence by decree for a maximum of three months initially. If necessary, it can be extended for a maximum of one year at a time. A state of defence may also be declared in a region of the country. The decree must be submitted to parliament for approval.

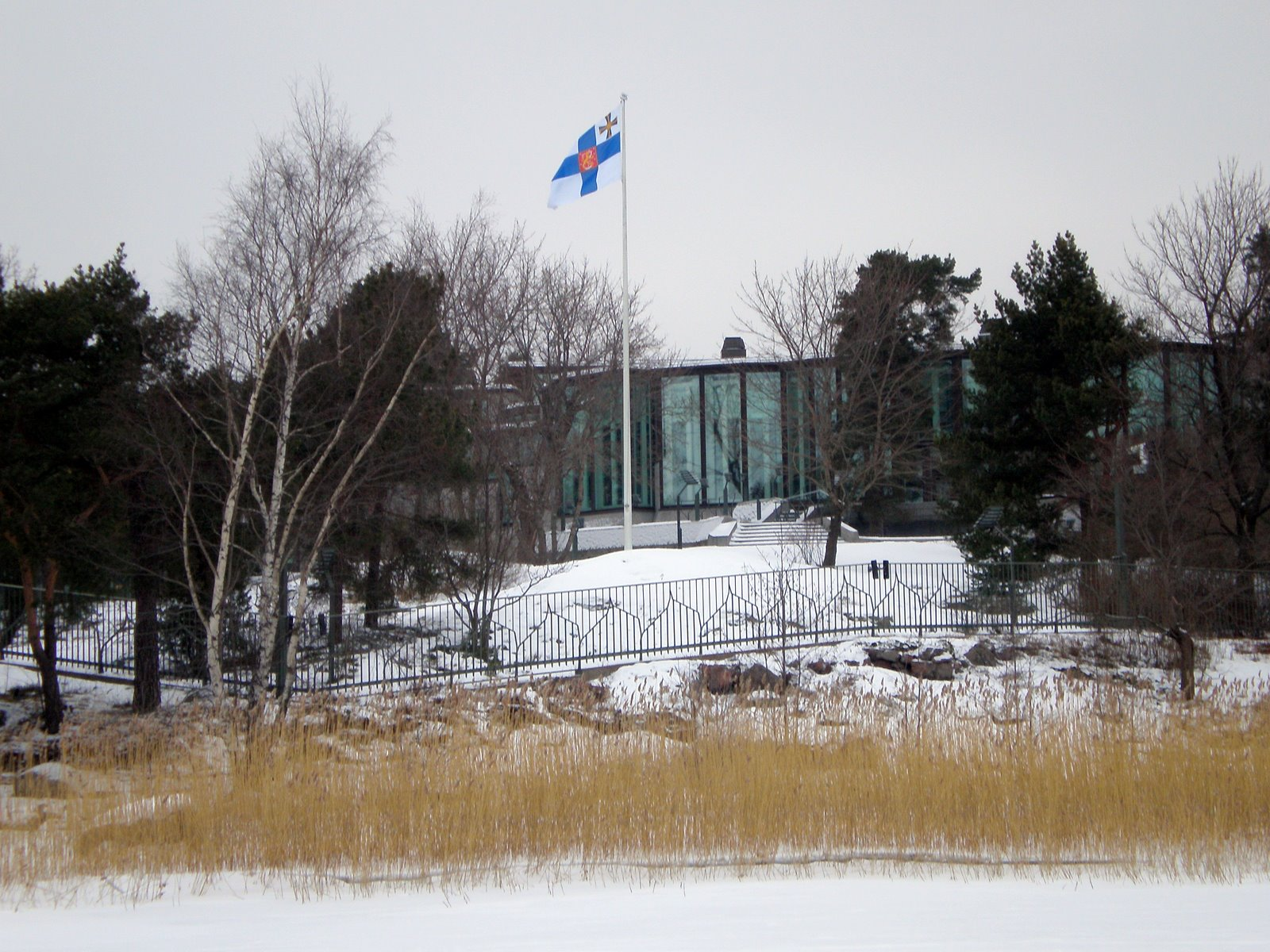
Mäntyniemi, the private residence of the president

=== Appointing and discharging ministers ===
The prime minister and other members of the Government are appointed and discharged by the president of the republic. After parliamentary elections or in any other situation where the government has resigned, the president, taking into account the result of consultations between the parliamentary groups and having heard the view of the speaker, submits a nominee for prime minister to Parliament. If confirmed by Parliament with a majority of the votes cast, the president then proceeds to appoint the prime minister and other ministers. The president is constitutionally required to dismiss a government or any minister as soon as that government has lost the confidence of Parliament.

=== Other appointing powers ===
Presidential Standard of 1944–1946, during the presidency of Gustaf Mannerheim

Presidential Standard of 1920–1944 and 1946–1978

Presidential Standard since 1978

The president appoints:

- Governor, and other members of the board of the Bank of Finland
- Chancellor of justice and the vice-chancellor of justice
- Prosecutor-general and the vice prosecutor-general
- Ambassadors and heads of diplomatic missions abroad
- Executive of Kela (Social Insurance Institution)
- Secretary general and presenters at Office of the President of the Republic

Most of the appointment process is conducted at the respective ministry: The Office of the President does not process preparations or presentations of the appointment. Nevertheless, presidents have used these powers publicly, even against the internal recommendation of the agency.

In addition, the president appoints or gives commission to:

- Officers of the Finnish Defence Forces and the Finnish Border Guard
- Permanent judges, including presidents and members of the Supreme Court and the Supreme Administrative Court, presidents and members of the courts of appeal and administrative courts of appeal.

=== International relations ===
The president conducts Finland's foreign policy in co-operation with the Finnish Government. The provisions of treaties and other international obligations are implemented by acts of parliament if they are of legislative nature. Otherwise a presidential or governmental decree is used. Presidential or governmental degree is also used to further implement any act of parliament providing the obligations. In both cases of decree use, governmental degree is used if the matter concerns the EU or otherwise is not provided by the authorising act. Decisions on war and peace are taken by the president with the assent of parliament.

=== Legislation ===
The president must sign and approve all bills adopted by Parliament before they become law. The president must decide on ratification within three months of receiving the bill and may request an opinion from the Supreme Court or the Supreme Administrative Court before giving assent. Should the president refuse assent or fail to decide on the matter in time, Parliament reconsiders the bill and can readopt it with a majority of votes cast. The bill will then enter into force without ratification. If Parliament fails to readopt the bill, it is deemed to have lapsed.

=== Presidential pardon ===
In single cases, the president has the power of pardon from a penalty or any other criminal sanction imposed by a court. General pardon requires an act of parliament.

The power of pardon has effectively become the instrument to limit life imprisonment to 12 years or more, since successive presidents have eventually given pardon to all felons. The president, however, retains the power to deny pardon. In autumn 2006, the regular paroling of convicts serving a life sentence power was transferred to the Helsinki Court of Appeals, and the peculiar arrangement, where the president exercises judicial power, ended. The presidential power of giving pardon is, however, retained. Its use has diminished under president Sauli Niinistö, who exercised the power particularly sparingly.

In 2022 the Supreme Court of Finland issued an advisory opinion that interpreted restrictions on business practise to be criminal sanctions as defined in the constitution In overturning a previous precedent that limited the scope of pardons the court relied on the reasonings of lawmakers for replacing "punishment" with "criminal sanction" when codifying the constitution and the intent of lawmakers when creating the law on business restrictions. Furthermore, the court relied on the judicial practise surrounding the restriction.

=== Commander-in-chief of the defence forces ===
The president of the republic is the commander-in-chief of the Finnish Defence Forces, but may delegate this position to another Finnish citizen. Delegation of the position of commander-in-chief is an exception to the principle that the president cannot delegate functions to others. The last time this has occurred was in the Second World War (to Field Marshal Carl Gustaf Emil Mannerheim). The president commissions officers and decides on the mobilisation of the Defence Forces. If Parliament is not in session when a decision to mobilise is taken, it must be immediately convened. As commander-in-chief, the president has the power to issue military orders concerning general guidelines for military defence, significant changes in military preparedness and the principles according to which military defence is implemented.

Decisions concerning military orders are made by the president in conjunction with the prime minister, and the minister of defence. The president decides on military appointments in conjunction with the minister of defence.

=== Decorations ===
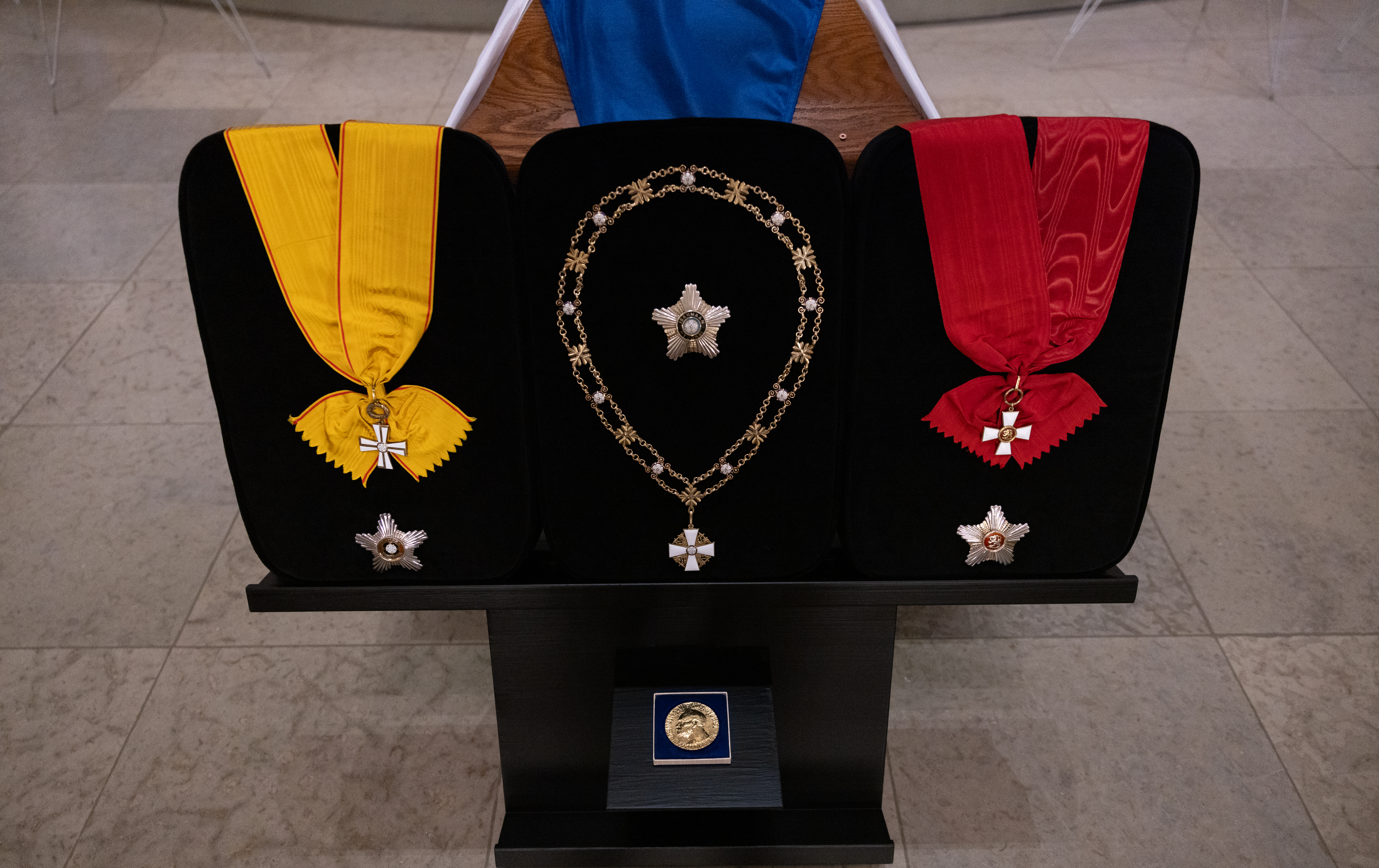
All three Finnish orders on display at the state funeral of Martti Ahtisaari together with his Nobel Peace Prize.

The president, as grand master, awards decorations and medals belonging to the Order of the White Rose of Finland, the Order of the Lion of Finland and the Order of the Cross of Liberty to Finnish and foreign citizens. Likewise, titles of honor are awarded by the president; these include, for example, "professor" and different "counsellor" titles. These titles are symbolic, carry no responsibilities and have a similar role as knighting in monarchies. The highest titles are valtioneuvos (statesman) and vuorineuvos (industrial).

=== Speeches ===
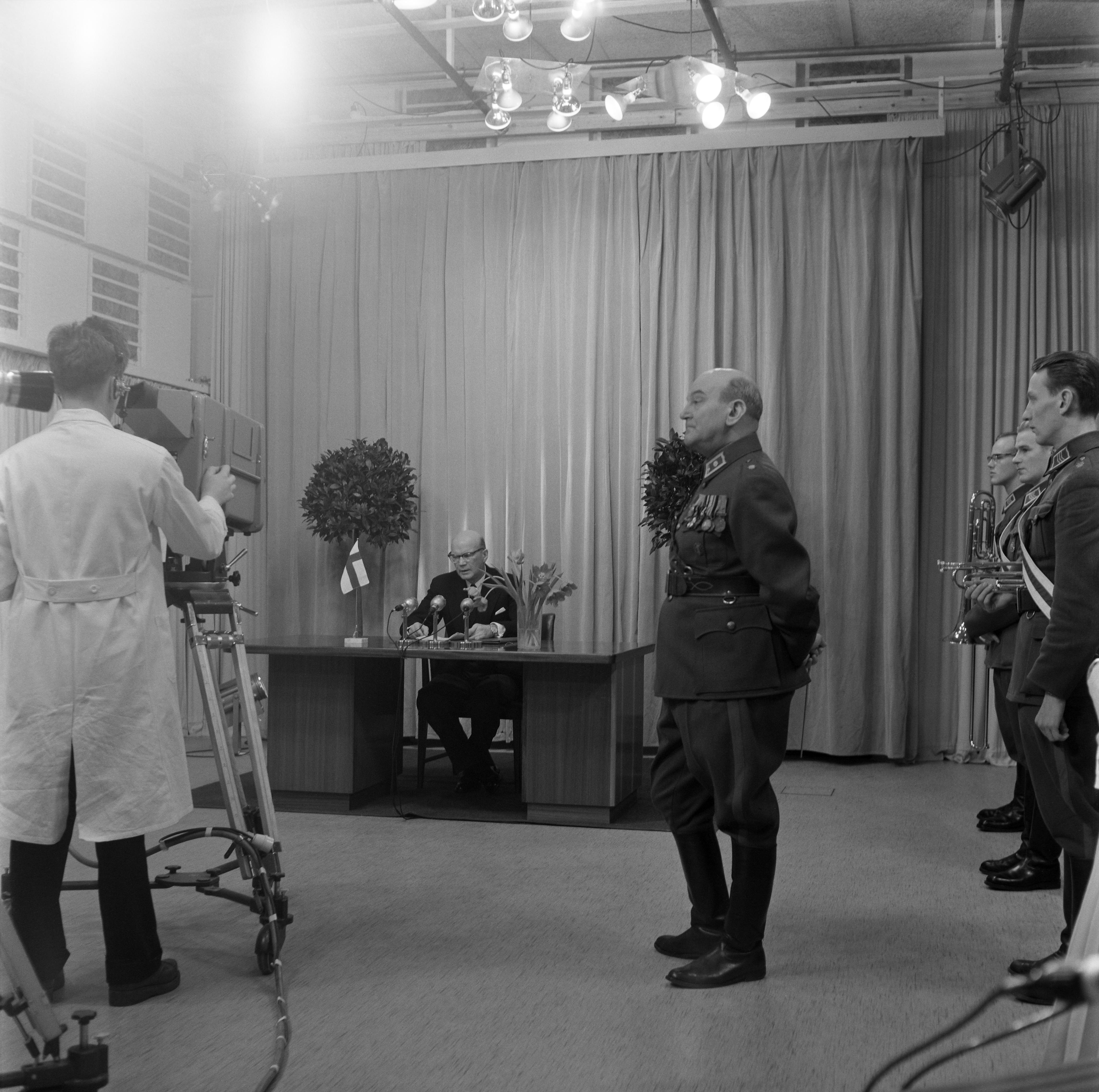
Urho Kekkonen's New Year's speech (1.1.1958)

The president makes a number of important public speeches and statements each year. The most notable of these are the annual New Year's Speech on 1 January, and the speech at the opening of each annual session of parliament.

=== Compensation ===
From 2012 to 2013, the president received an annual salary of 160,000 euros. The salary and other benefits are exempt from all taxes. In 2013, the salary was cut to 126,000 euros on the initiative of Sauli Niinistö. As of 1 March 2024, the salary was restored to its previous amount of 160,000 euros. In addition to the salary the president is entitled to an apartment as well as necessary staff. Any president who serves for six years or longer is entitled to a full pension at "sixty percent of the currently valid remuneration of the president of the republic" as well as living arrangements. The president's salary and housing benefits are tax-free.

== Official residences ==
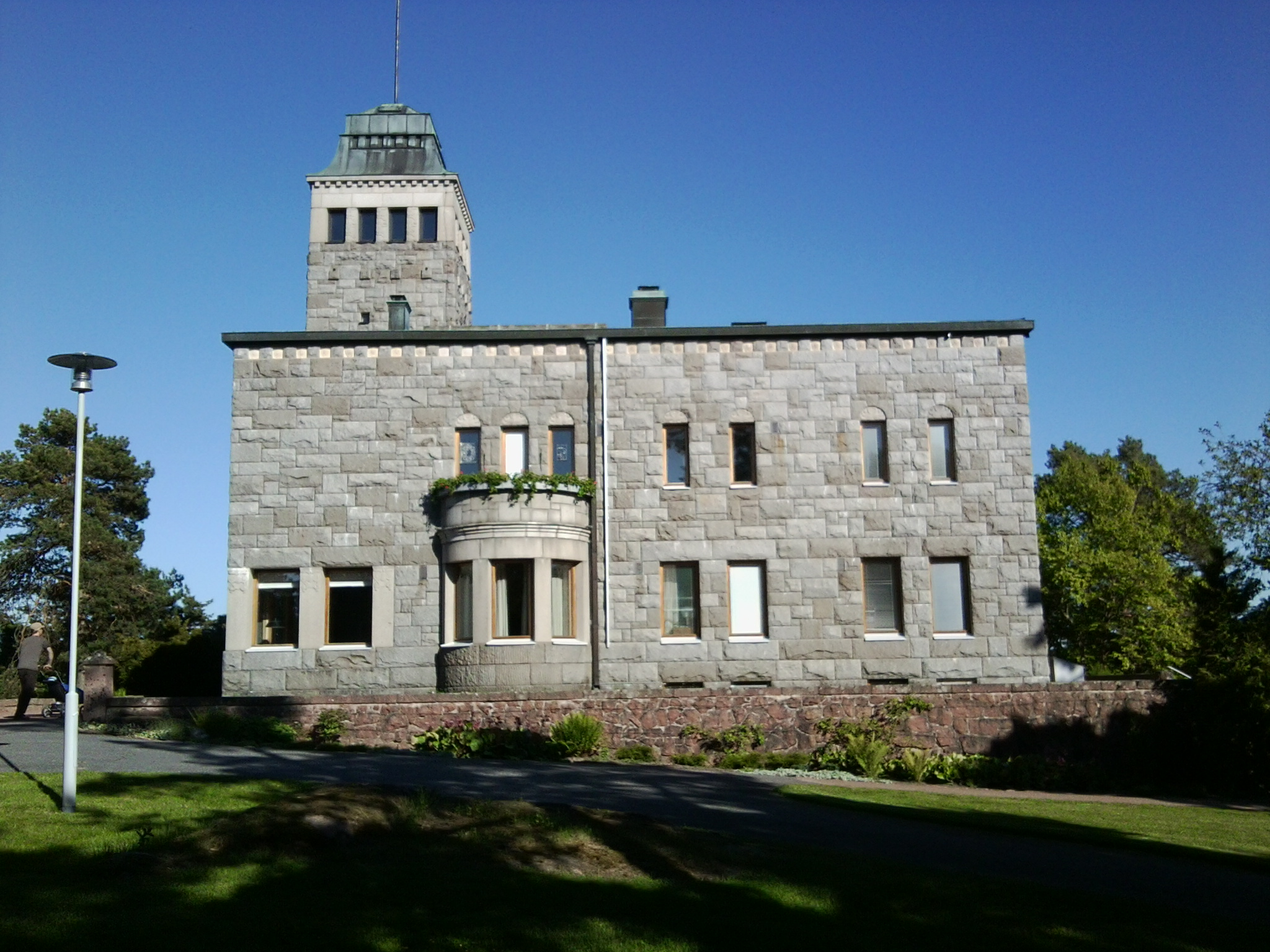
Kultaranta, the summer residence of the President of Finland

The president has the use of three properties for residential and hospitality purposes: the Presidential Palace and Mäntyniemi, both in Helsinki, and Kultaranta in Naantali on the west coast near Turku.

=== Independence Day Reception ===
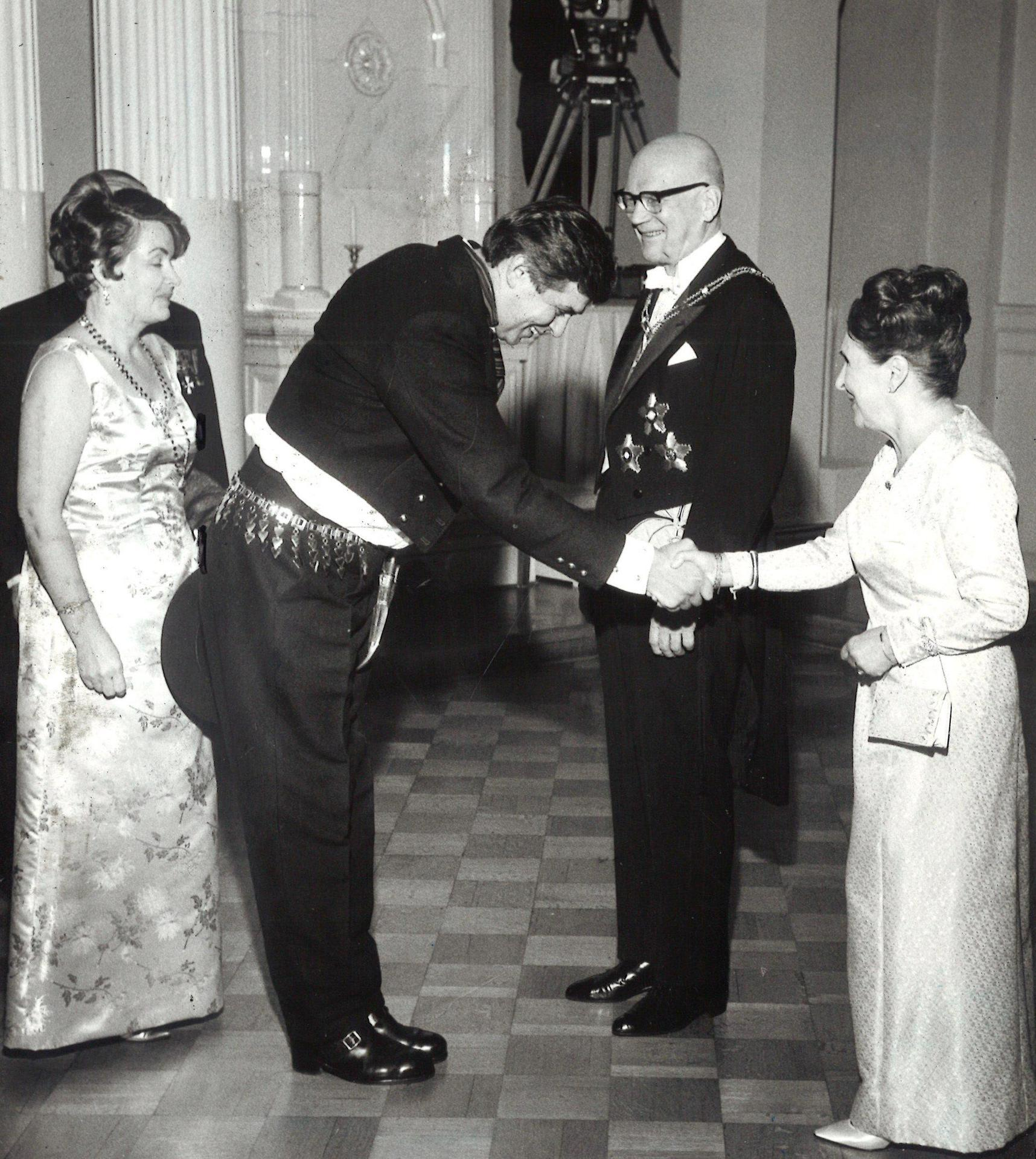
Actor Tarmo Manni greeting President Urho Kekkonen's wife Sylvi Kekkonen at the 1965 Independence Day Reception in the Presidential Palace

The traditional Independence Day Reception (in Finnish: Linnanjuhlat, "the Castle Ball") at the Presidential Palace on 6 December is one of the key annual events in the presidential calendar. It originated as a celebration of Finland's national independence and pride, and although nowadays it is seen by some as a glorified social party, the reception is broadcast every year on Finnish television and has very high viewer ratings. The number of guests invited has varied from about 1,600 to 2,000. With the exception of ambassadors to Finland, only Finnish citizens are invited.

The history of the Independence Day reception stretches back to 1919, when the first afternoon reception was held at the Presidential Palace. In 1922, President Ståhlberg hosted the first evening reception at the palace, with the reception beginning at nine o' clock. Guests included the Government, diplomats, Members of Parliament, high-ranking officers, senior civil servants, artists and other prominent people. Music and dancing were on the programme and the reception lasted until late night. Similar receptions have been held ever since, though less regularly in the beginning.

Since 1946 the Independence Day reception has taken place at the Presidential Palace every year with six exceptions. In 1952 it was cancelled on account of President Paasikivi's illness. In 1972 it was held at Finlandia Hall in connection with the Independence Day concert, with the Prime Minister as host, because the Presidential Palace was being renovated. In 1974 it was cancelled on account of the death of President Kekkonen's wife only a few days prior to the reception. In 1981 it was held at Finlandia Hall after the Independence Day concert, with Deputy Prime Minister Eino Uusitalo as host, because President Kekkonen had resigned in October and Acting President Mauno Koivisto was campaigning for the presidency. In 2013, the reception was held at the Tampere Hall in central Tampere, because the Presidential Palace in Helsinki was undergoing repairs at the time. This was the first time during the era of independence that the reception was held outside Helsinki. In 2020, the reception was cancelled because of the ongoing COVID-19 pandemic.

The president and president's spouse greet the guests individually in the State Hall at the beginning of the evening. Later on there is dancing, music provided by the Guards Band, and a traditional buffet.

== History ==
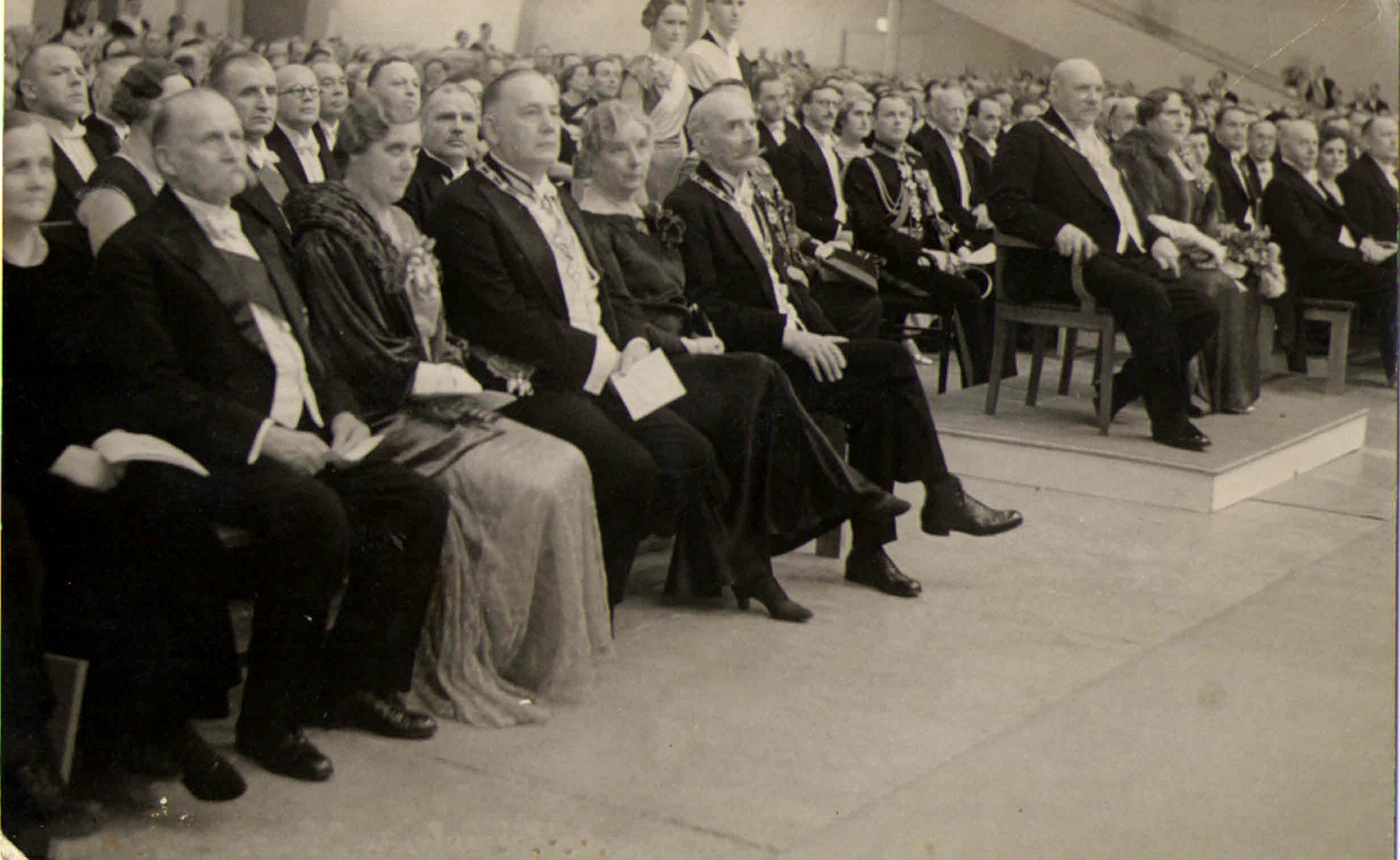
The President of Finland P. E. Svinhufvud's 75th birthday on 15 December 1936. Svinhufvud sitting on the dais with his wife Ellen; from them to the left, the President K. J. Ståhlberg and his wife Ester, the President Lauri Kristian Relander and his wife Signe as well as the Prime Minister, later President Kyösti Kallio and his wife Kaisa. To the upper left of Signe Relander is the Minister of Justice, later President Urho Kekkonen

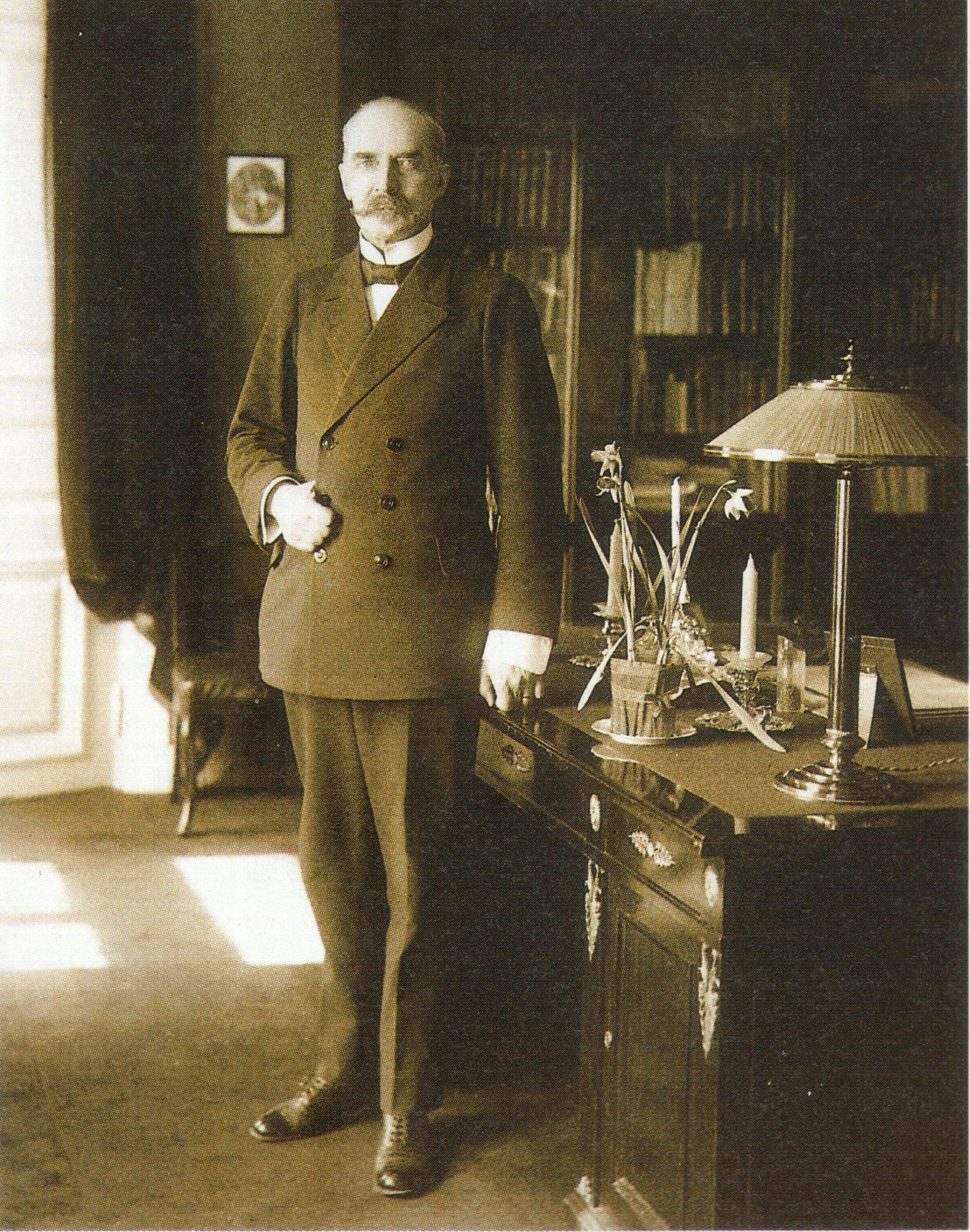
K. J. Ståhlberg, the 1st President of Finland, at his office in 1919

After Finland's independence and the Civil War in Finland the matter of whether Finland should be a republic or a constitutional monarchy was much debated (see Frederick Charles of Hesse), and the outcome was a compromise: a rather monarchy-like, strong presidency with great powers over Finland's foreign affairs, the appointment of the Government and the officers of the civil service. The Constitution was changed in 2000, to redistribute some of this power to Parliament and the Government. The Constitution specifies how the principles of parliamentarism are to be followed. Most significantly, the president can no longer nominate the prime minister or individual ministers independently. For example, this power was previously used to form governments where the party in plurality was excluded. Regarding the right to dissolve Parliament, consultation with the prime minister and heads of parliamentary groups was made mandatory before Parliament could be dissolved and new elections ordered. Furthermore, some appointing powers, such as appointment of provincial governors and department heads at ministries, were transferred to the Government.

=== Pre-republican heads of state ===
From the declaration of Finland's independence on 6 December 1917 until the end of the Finnish Civil War in May 1918, Pehr Evind Svinhufvud was the head of state of White Finland in his capacity as chairman of the Senate. Between May 1918 and July 1919, Finland had two regents (Finnish: valtionhoitaja, Swedish: stathållare, lit. Care-taker of State) and, for a time, an elected king, although the latter renounced the throne:

- Pehr Evind Svinhufvud, Regent (18 May 1918 – 12 December 1918)
  - Prince Frederick Charles of Hesse, elected as King of Finland on 7 October 1918 but never took office and renounced the throne on 4 December after Germany's defeat in World War I – he had not time enough to arrive in Finland before the political climate changed following the end of the war. It is said that his regnal name was to be Väinö I of Finland ("Väinö" obviously referring to Väinämöinen, one of the main characters in the Finnish national epic Kalevala), but due to there not being contemporary records of this name it is widely considered a popular misbelief, probably created by columnist Väinö Nuorteva.
- Carl Gustaf Emil Mannerheim, Regent (12 December 1918 – 26 July 1919)

Both Svinhufvud and Mannerheim later served as president of Finland.

Gallery of Presidential state cars from different eras

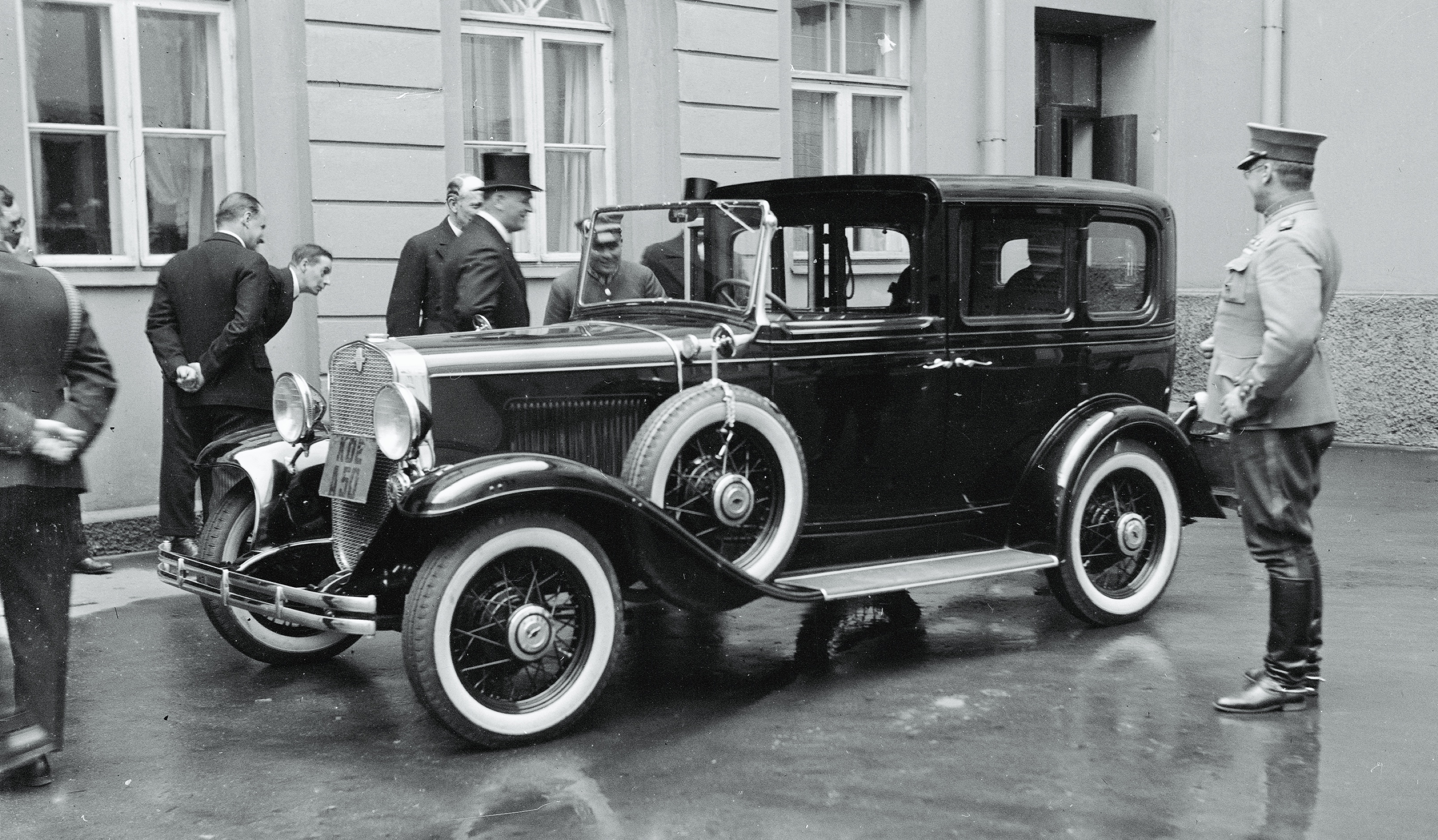
Chrysler Imperial from 1931

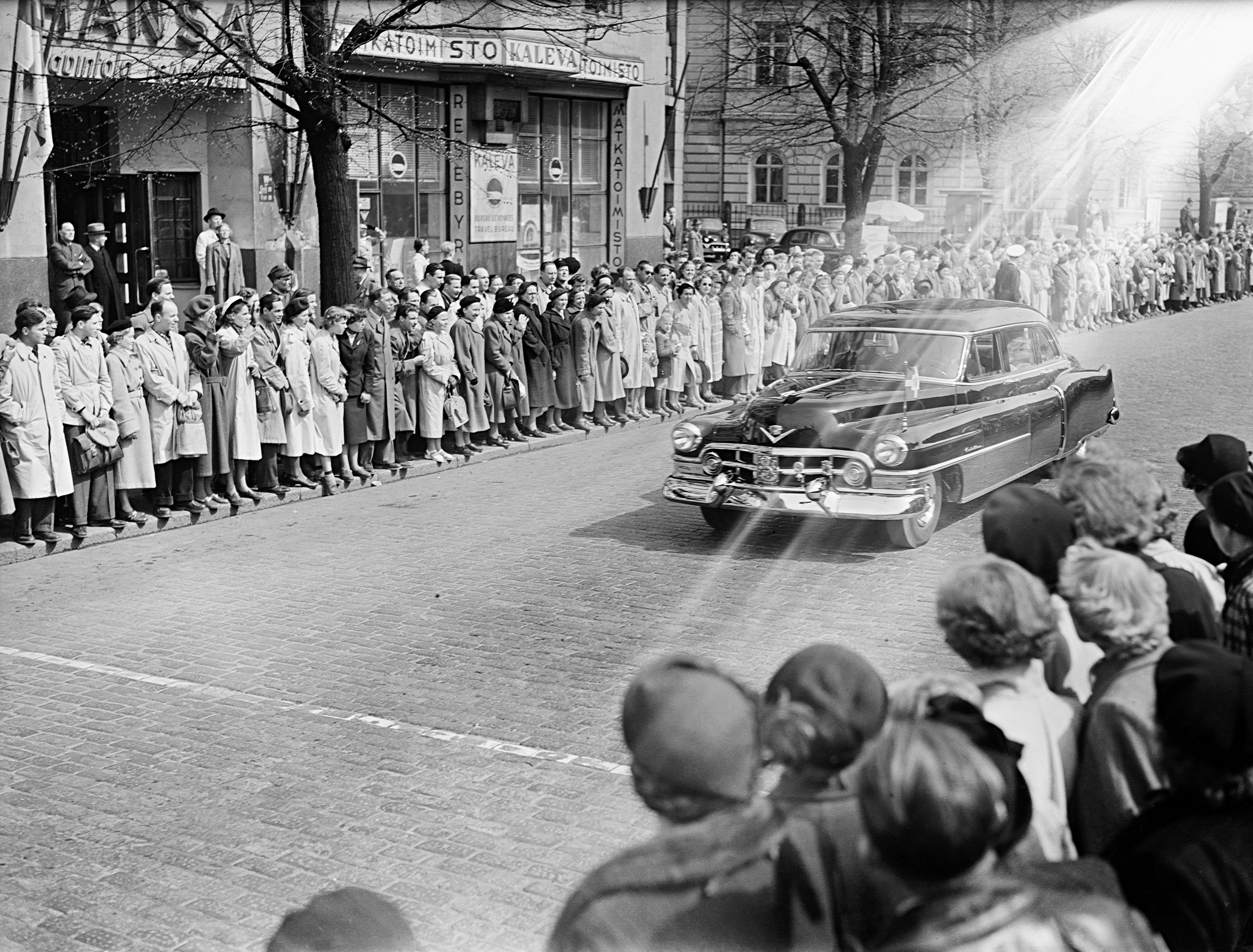
Cadillac from 1952

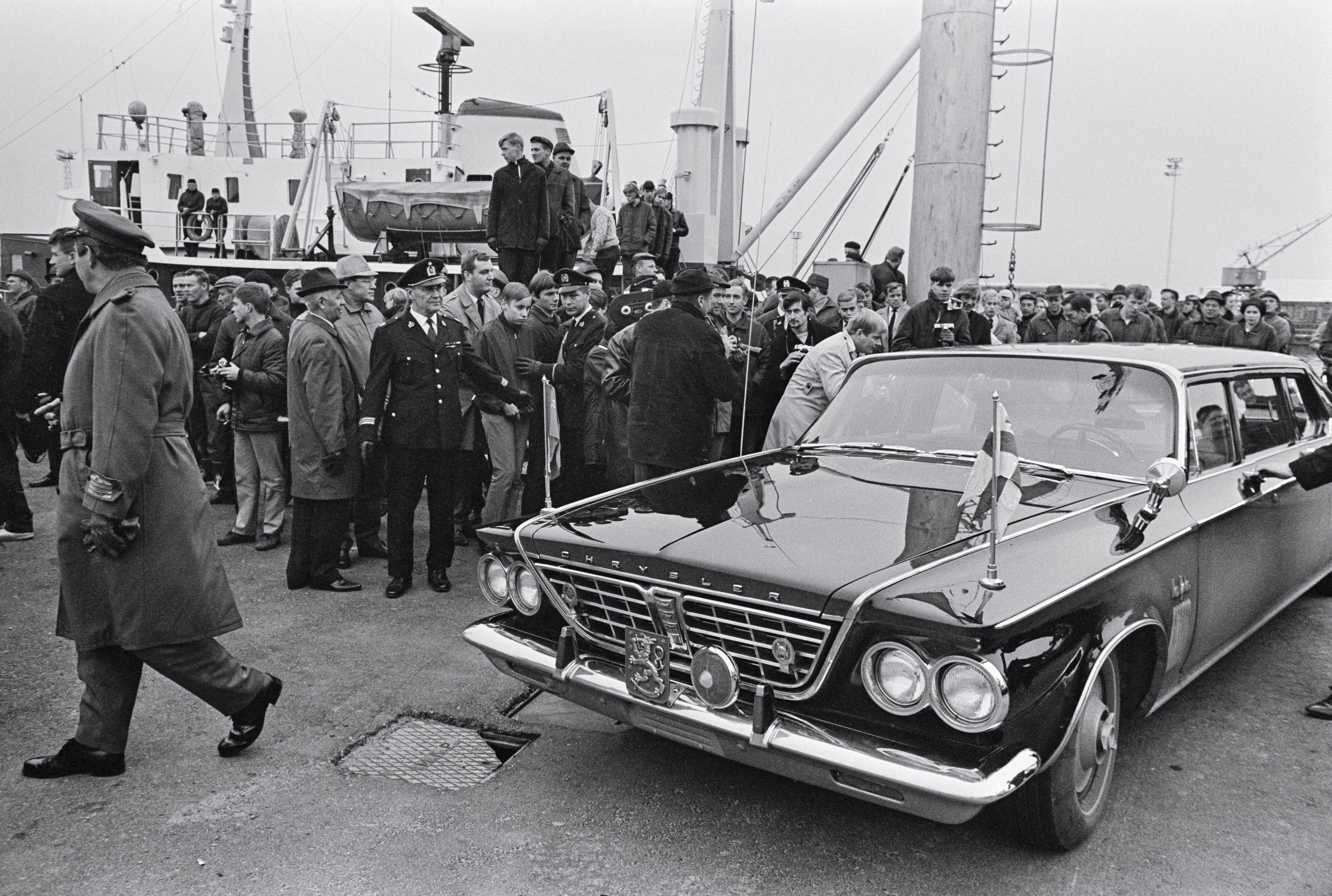
Chrysler New Yorker from 1968

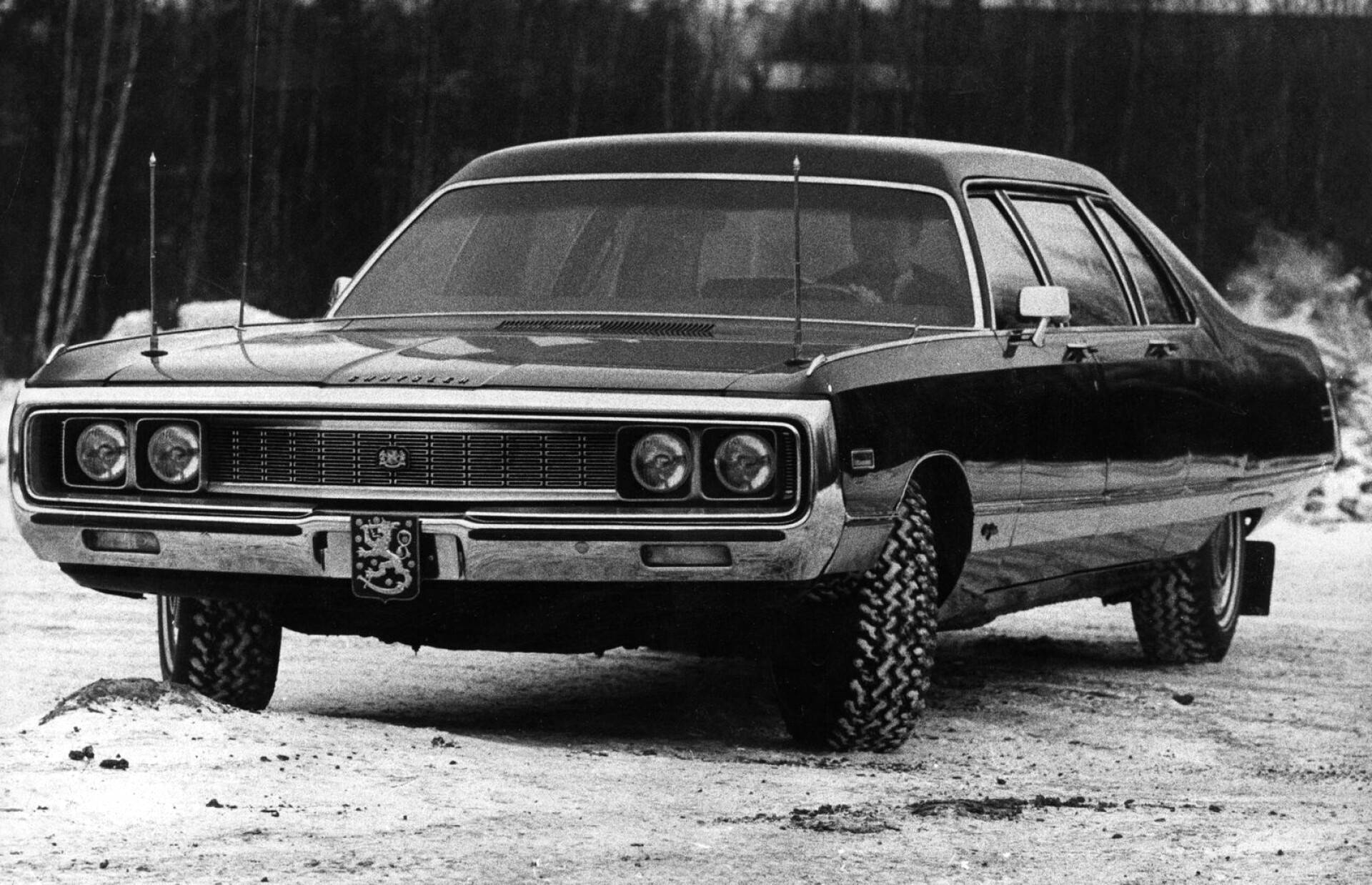
Chrysler New Yorker from 1972

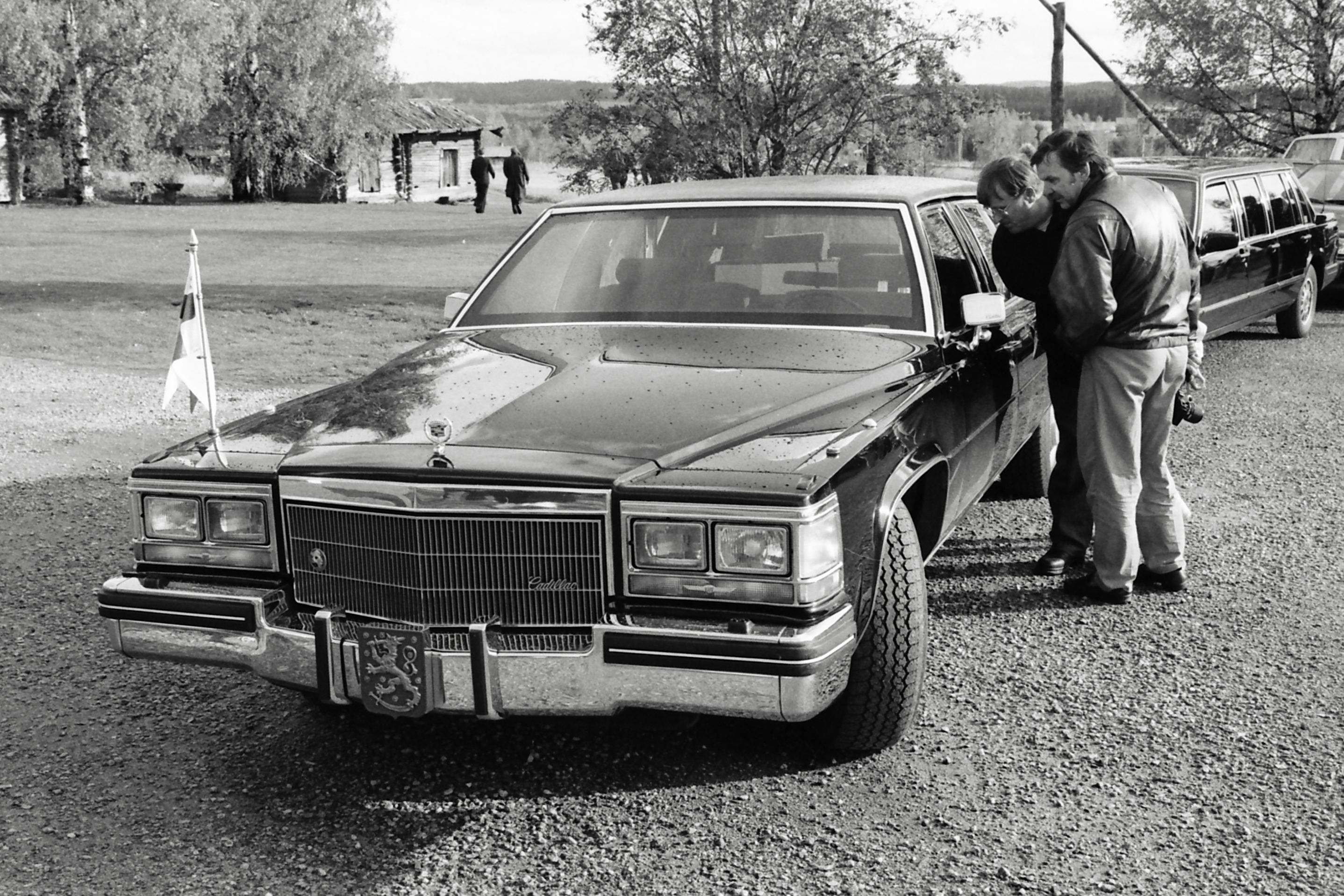
Cadillac from 1991

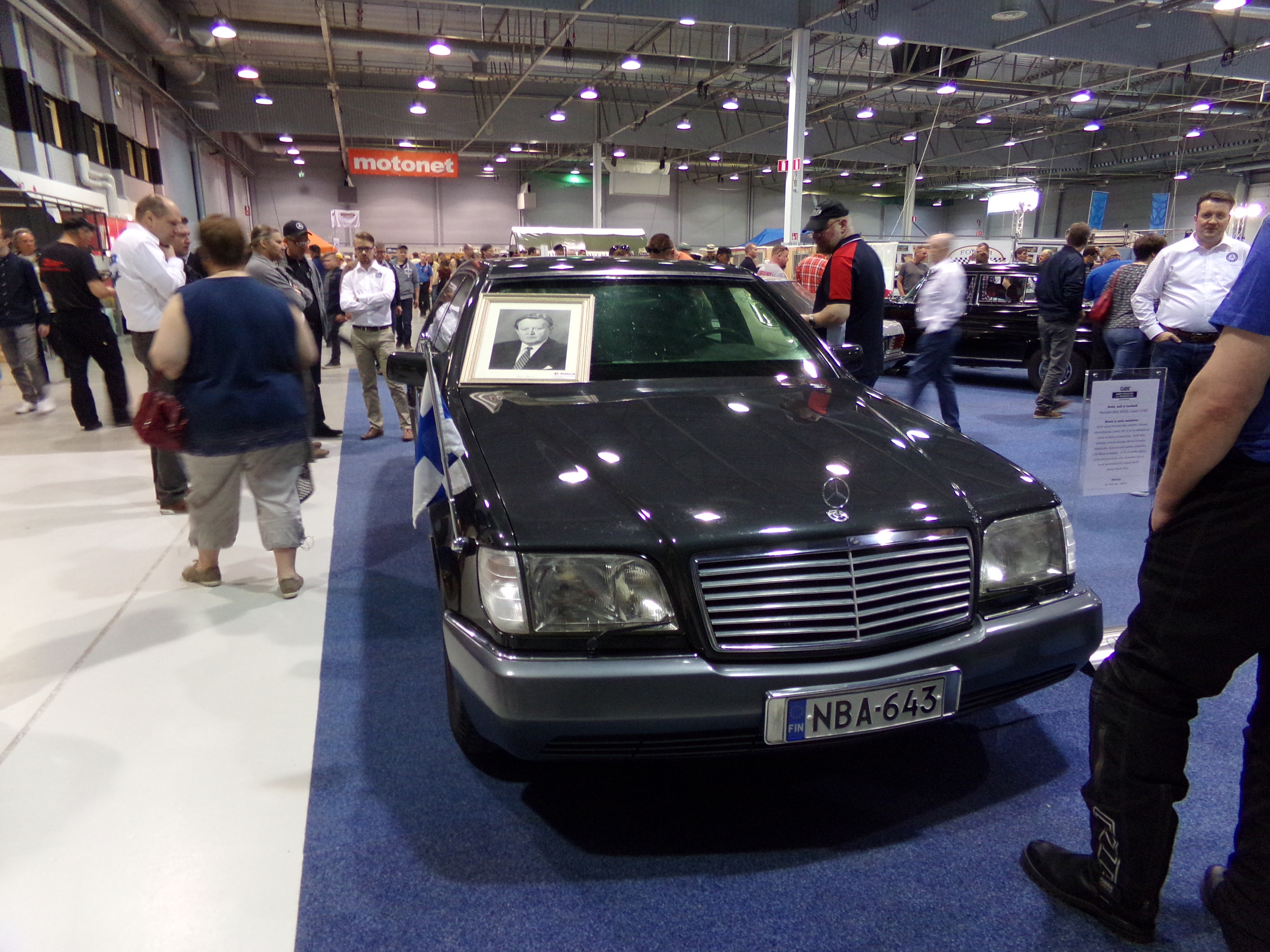
Mercedes-Benz from 1990s

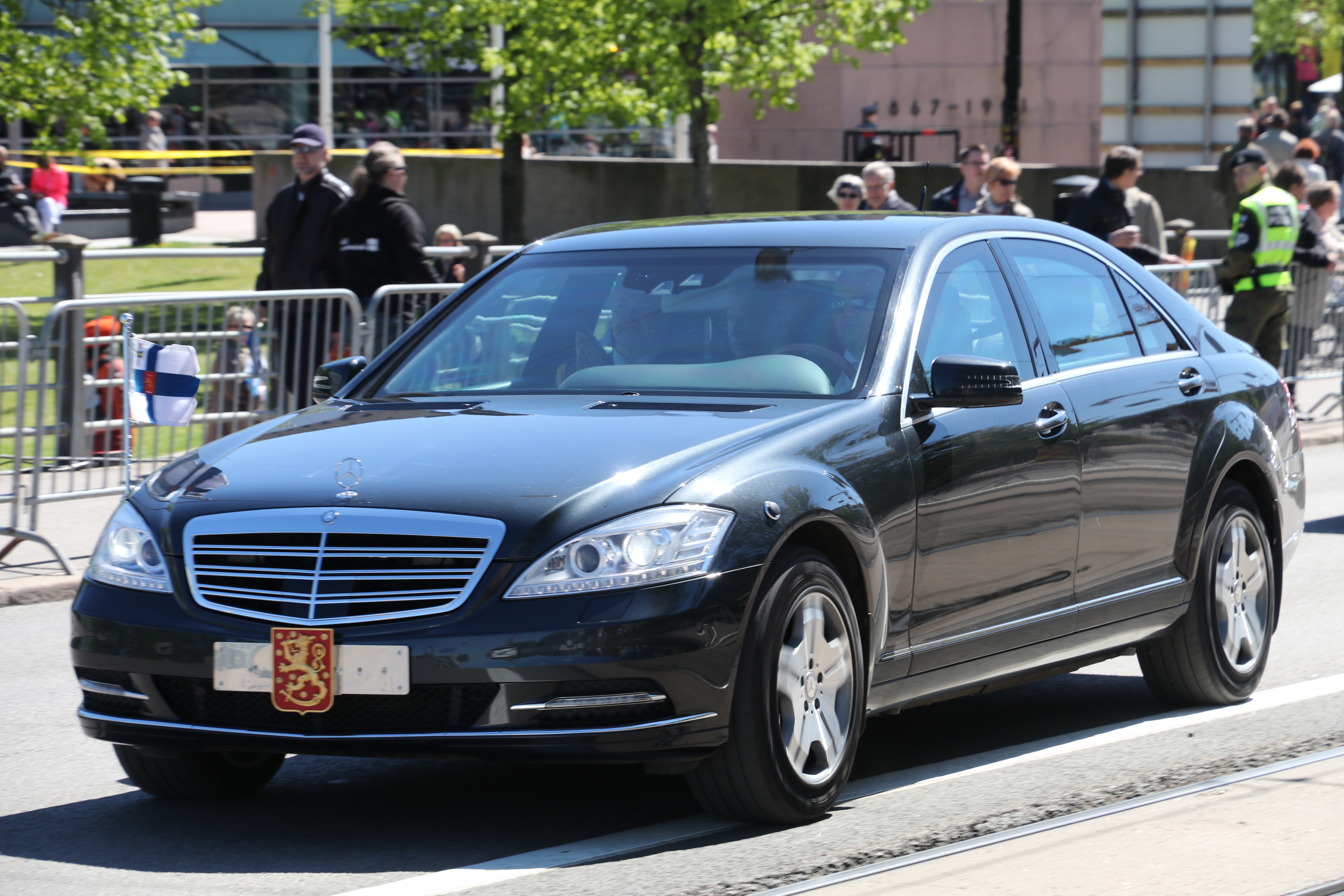
Mercedes-Benz S600 L Guard from 2017

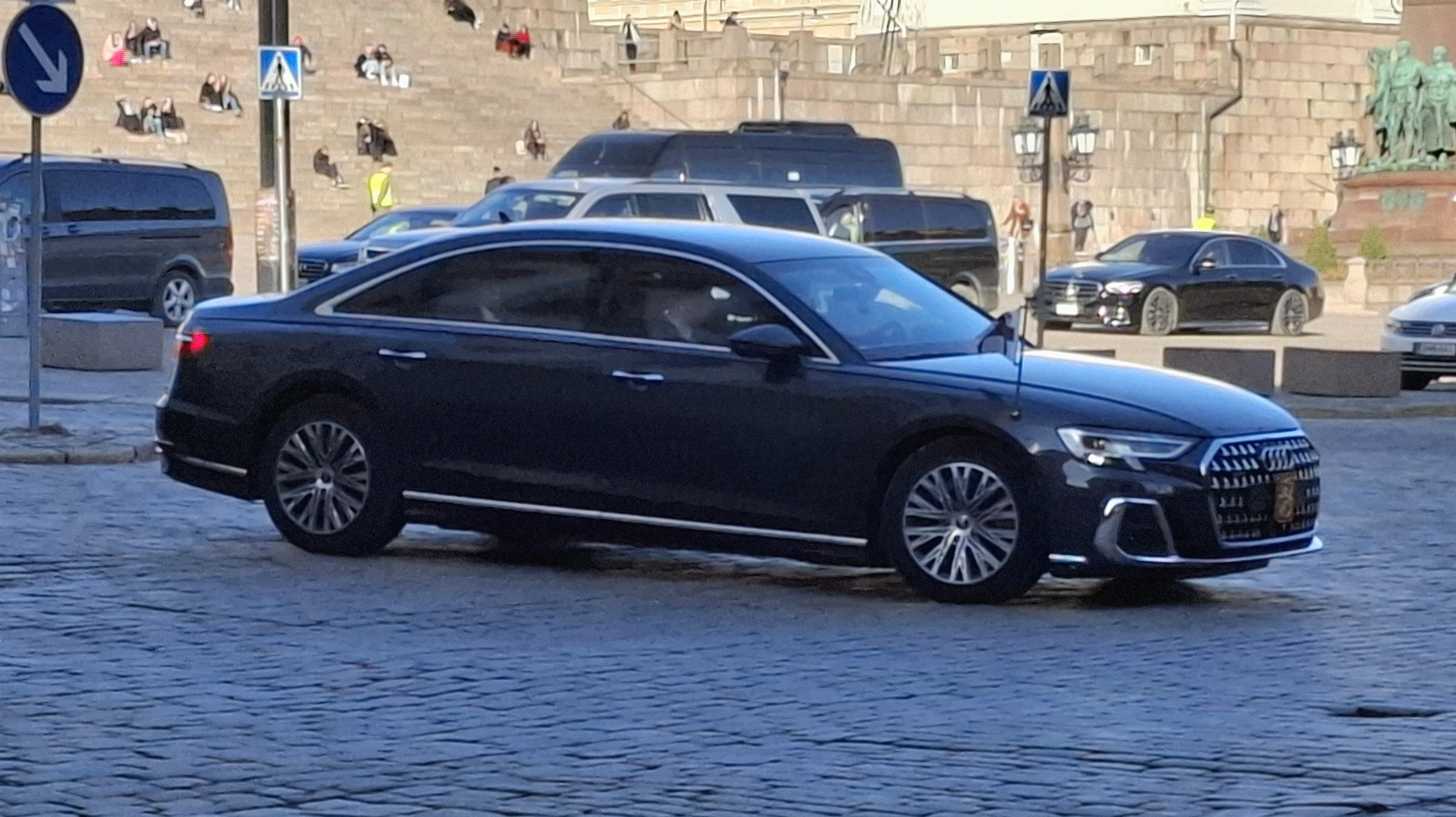
Audi A8 from 2025

== See also ==
- Prime Minister of Finland
  - List of prime ministers of Finland
- List of Finnish rulers
- Political parties in Finland
- Spouses of presidents of Finland
