= Rylander =

Rylander is a surname. Notable people with this surname include:

- Amanda Rylander (1832–1920), Swedish stage actress
- Carole Keeton Rylander (born 1939), American politician
- H. Grady Rylander (1921–2010), American mechanical engineer
- Hans Christian Rylander (born 1939), Danish painter
- Ragnar Rylander (1935–2016), Swedish environmental health researcher
- Sten Rylander (born 1944), Swedish diplomat
