= Lauri Kristian Relander =

Finnish politician (1883–1942)

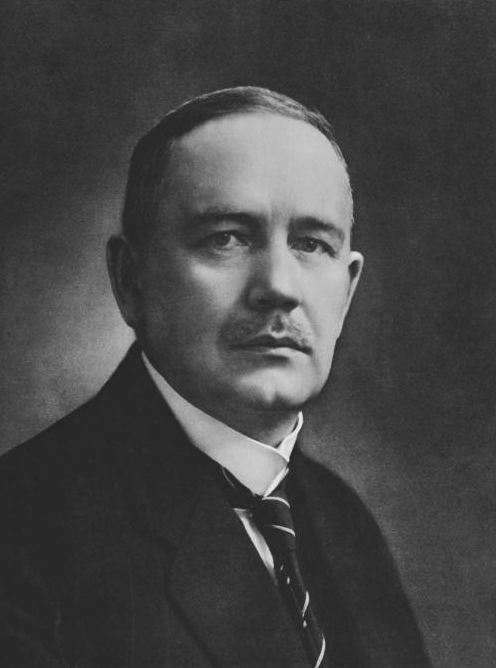
- Official Portrait, c. 1920s

2nd President of Finland
- In office 2 March 1925 – 2 March 1931
- Prime Minister: Lauri Ingman; Antti Tulenheimo; Kyösti Kallio; Väinö Tanner; Juho Sunila; Oskari Mantere; Pehr Evind Svinhufvud
- Preceded by: Kaarlo Juho Ståhlberg
- Succeeded by: Pehr Evind Svinhufvud

Personal details
- Born: Lars Kristian Relander; 31 May 1883 Kurkijoki, Finland
- Died: 9 February 1942 (aged 58) Helsinki, Finland
- Resting place: Hietaniemi Cemetery
- Party: Agrarian League
- Spouse: Signe Relander
- Relatives: Evald Relander (father)

Lauri Kristian Relander (forenames Finnish: [ˈlɑu̯ri ˈkristiɑ̯n], surname Finland Swedish: [reˈlɑndær]; 31 May 1883 – 9 February 1942) was the president of Finland (1925–1931). A prominent member of the Agrarian League, he served as a member of Parliament, and as Speaker, before his election as president.

Relander is widely regarded as the most unknown of Finland's presidents, as he has been considered a colorless and weak president who, during a domestic politically broken period, allowed himself to be guided without a clear line of his own. In foreign policy, the policy of isolation was continued during Relander's term, although on the other hand the president did valuable work in representing Finland abroad and establishing relations at the head of state level with neighboring states, such as the other Nordic countries. Also during his presidency, Relander emphasized the preservation of social peace and otherwise required the left wing to accept the rules of the democracy, the right wing to accept the rules of the republic, and the nationalists to agree on the Finnish language policy.

== Early life and career ==
Relander was born in Kurkijoki, in Karelia, the son of Evald Kristian Relander, an agronomist, and Gertrud Maria Olsoni. He was christened Lars Kristian (Finland Swedish: [lɑːrs ˈkristiɑn]), but he Finnicized his forenames to Lauri Kristian during his time at school. Relander followed in his father's footsteps by enrolling at the University of Helsinki in 1901 to study agronomy. He gained his first bachelor's degree in philosophy in 1905, and his second, in agronomy, the following year. That year also saw his marriage to Signe Maria Österman (1886–1962). They had two children, Maja-Lisa (1907–1990) and Ragnar (1910–1970).

The major subjects for Relander's master's degree, which he gained in 1907, were agricultural chemistry and agricultural economics. After obtaining his degree, Relander worked from 1908 to 1917 as a researcher at a state agricultural experimental institution, carrying out some important research in his field. He also continued his studies, gaining his Doctorate in 1914. However, his attempts at this time to gain a lectureship at the University of Helsinki failed. At this time, Relander was also politically active in the Agrarian League. He was elected to Parliament in 1910, serving until 1913, and again from 1917 to 1920. By 1917, he had become one of the leaders of the party.

== Politician ==
After independence, his political career went well. He was a prominent member of his party and served on a number of parliamentary committees. Relander was elected as Speaker of the Eduskunta for its 1919 session and part of its 1920 session. Later that year, he was appointed Governor of the Province of Viipuri. However, in the 1920s, he did not have enough support in his own party to become a minister.

In 1925, Relander was nominated as his party's candidate for that year's presidential election, which was confirmed only days before election day. Relander was only 41 at the time, and his nomination came as a surprise. It was further guaranteed by the fact that some of the party's key figures, such as Santeri Alkio and Kyösti Kallio, declined to stand.

Relander was elected in the third ballot of the electoral college, defeating the National Progressive Party candidate Risto Ryti by 172 votes to 109. He was elected largely due to the fact that he attracted less opposition than Risto Ryti. According to some contemporaries, at least the Swedish People's Party electors more eagerly voted for Relander because his wife happened to be a Finnish Swede. That story may be partly apocryphal because Ryti also had a Finnish-Swedish wife. On the other hand, Ryti had campaigned as a "Finnish peasant's son." Strong right-wing opposition to the outgoing Progressive (liberal) President K. J. Ståhlberg, Ryti's membership in the same party, and at least some career politicians' desire for a more approachable and less independent President may partly explain Relander's victory.

Two other important factors should be mentioned. Relander was an active member of the "Suojeluskunta" (Civil Guard) voluntary military organization, and he accepted the right-wing worldview typical of White veterans of the Civil War clearly more wholeheartedly than Ryti. Also as people, Relander and Ryti were notably different: despite having a doctorate, Relander was much more talkative and social than the intellectual and thoughtful Ryti.

== President ==
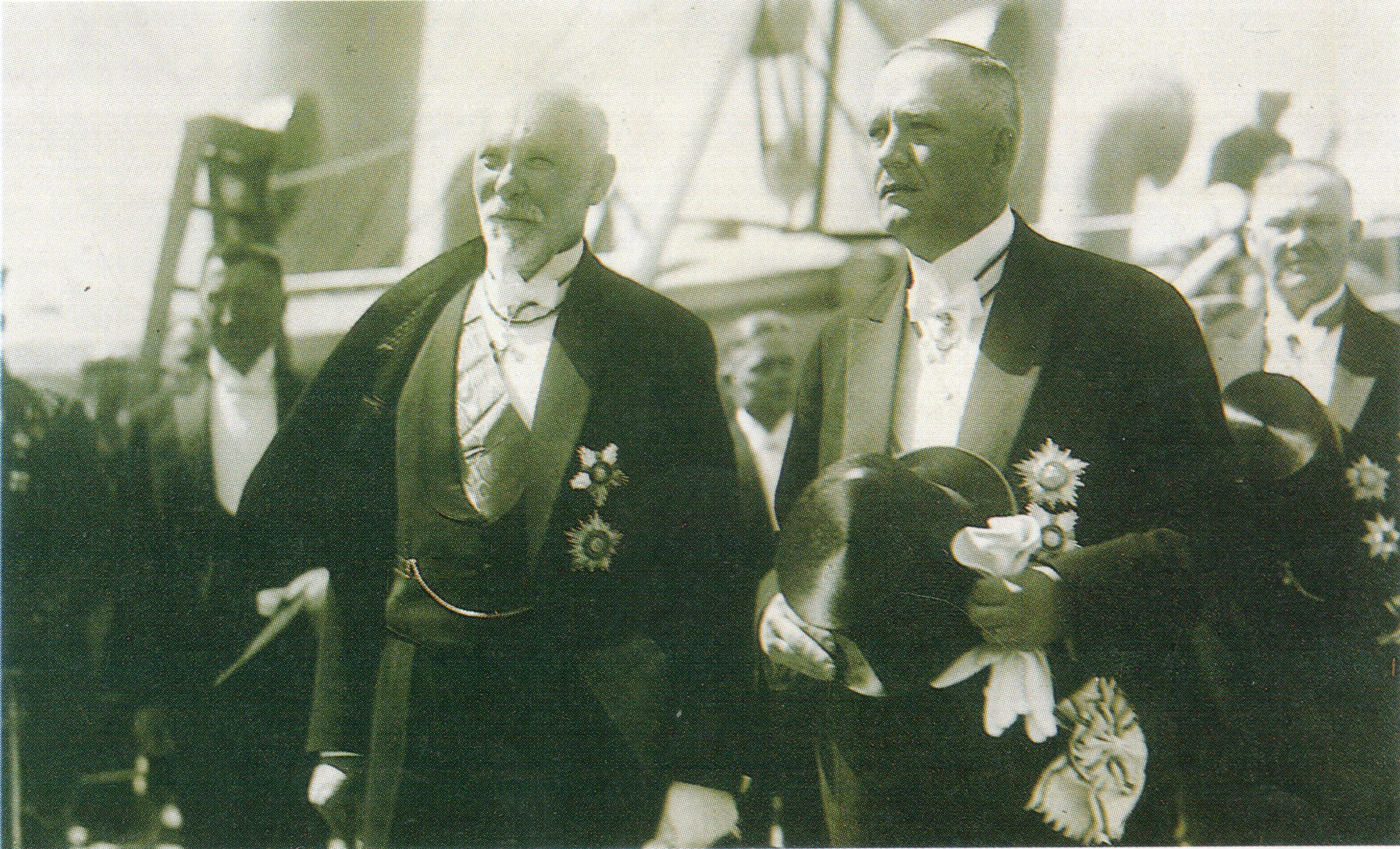
Relander and President of Latvia Jānis Čakste during Relander's 1926 official visit to Latvia. In the background, the Foreign Minister of Finland Eemil Nestor Setälä to the right.

As President, Relander was politically inexperienced and young. Politicians and other opinion leaders could not take him seriously. Relander had no political base to speak of, and he was deemed to have no particular program for his presidency, which further decreased his support. Even Relander's continual state visits and trips drew criticism, leading to him gaining the nickname of Reissu-Lasse (Travelling Lasse). He was continually compared to Ståhlberg and his performance as president, which was almost completely opposite to that of Relander. Ståhlberg, of course, did not appreciate his successor at all but would have preferred to have seen Ryti as his successor; when Relander was elected, he muttered:

May those take care of him who have hired him for it.

Relander read the daily newspapers carefully and acquired a radio for the Presidential Palace, from which he could listen to the parliamentary question-and-answer debate for half a day at a time. However, he received little love in return from the media, and Helsingin Sanomat, the mouthpiece of the Progressive Party at the time, was particularly hostile towards him. Once, he invited Helsingin Sanomat's editor-in-chief Eljas Erkko for coffee at the Presidential Palace with the intention of improving his relations with the newspaper, but the hour-long conversation did not produce the desired result in this regard.

The cabinets during his term tended to be weak, short-lived minority cabinets, like in most European democracies of the time. All in all, Relander is remembered as a weak leader. On the other hand, Relander was an idealist, deplored the toughness of the political game and preferred minority governments of supposedly excellent individuals over majority governments of unprincipled individuals.

Relander can not be considered a strong president, but he did a few notable things during his single term. He allowed the Social Democrats to form a minority government (1926–1927), appointed Finland's first female cabinet minister, Miina Sillanpää (as Assistant Minister of Social Welfare), dissolved Parliament twice (in 1929 over a dispute on the civil servants' salaries and in 1930 to have the Parliament outlaw the Communist Party, which required a constitutional amendment and thus a two-thirds majority), and generally supported the far-right Lapua Movement until it started to kidnap various political opponents. Relander himself considered his worst mistake to be shaking hands with the leader of the movement, Vihtori Kosola, in connection with a peasant march in the summer of 1930, which was considered to be a good example of Relander's indiscretion. He maintained a rather close friendship with the Social Democratic leader, Väinö Tanner.

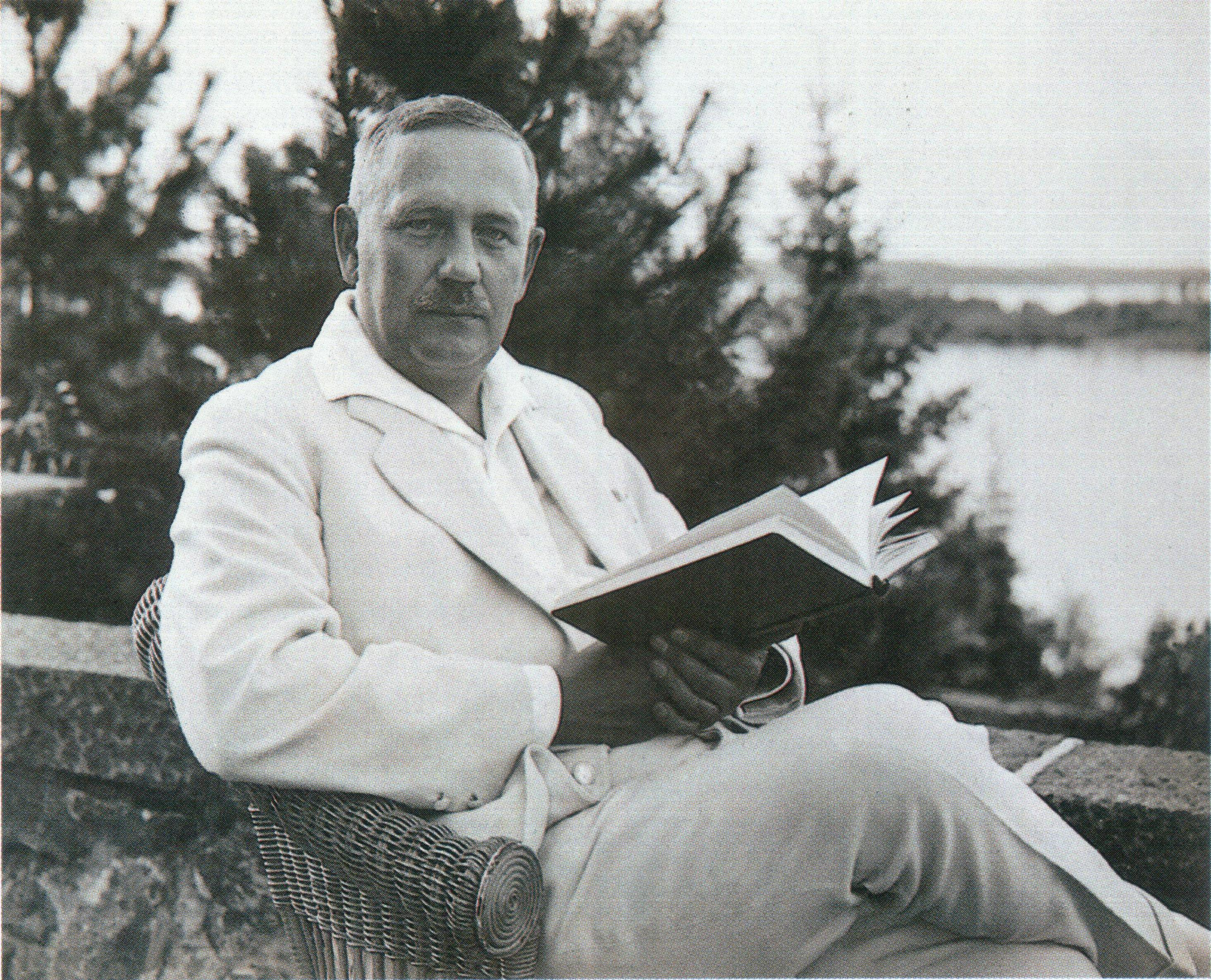
Relander relaxing in Kultaranta, a summer residence of the Finnish presidents

In the late autumn of 1930, Relander realized he would not be re-elected and, during the winter of 1930–31, sabotaged the prospects of his former Agrarian League colleague and rival Kyösti Kallio so that Pehr Evind Svinhufvud, Relander's former Prime Minister, was elected. In Relander's opinion, Kallio did not talk straight to him and schemed behind his back to weaken his presidency and help his political opponents. In Kallio's opinion, Relander was a rather inexperienced politician who had high ideals but not enough common sense to implement them. As it is, the dispute between Relander and Kallio was due to personal chemistry and political line differences, as Relander, for example, was more positive about right-wing radicalism, a nationalist movement like the Lapua Movement, which marked his presidency so badly that his own party representatives were not worth defending. Even later, the battle for the party was personified by Kallio and J. E. Sunila, the latter of whom was supported by Relander.

After his term as president, he served from 1931 to 1942 as the General Manager of Suomen maalaisten paloapuyhdistys, a fire insurance company for rural people. Relander died on 9 February 1942 of heart failure. He was buried in the Hietaniemi Cemetery.

== Legacy ==
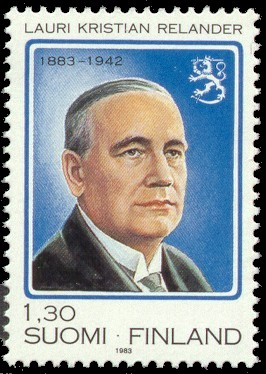
Relander's 100th Birthday Celebratory postage Stamp from 1983

The Relander Square (Relanderinaukio) in Helsinki's Kulosaari was named after Relander in 1959. An abstract Relander Memorial sculpture by Matti Peltokangas was erected on Helsinki's Hesperia Esplanade in 1996.

== Honours ==
=== National Honours ===
- Finland: Grand Cross of the Order of the White Rose of Finland
- Sweden: Knight of the Royal Order of the Seraphim

=== Foreign Honours ===
- Norway: Knight of the Royal Norwegian Order of Saint Olav
- Denmark: Knight of the Order of the Elephant
- Estonia: Cross of Liberty
- Estonia: Order of the Cross of the Eagle
- Latvia: Order of the Three Stars, 1st Class with Collar (17 Nov 1928)
- Poland: Order of the White Eagle
- Belgium: Order of Leopold

=== Coat of Arms ===
Coat of arms of Lauri Kristian Relander
Armiger Lauri Kristian Relander Crest On a torse Or and Sable a lance Or issuant and bearing a Banner with at the hoist a Canton Gules charged with the Finnish Lion surrounded with eight Roses Argent, the rest of the banner per fess Argent and Azure. Escutcheon Sable three Ears of corn Or Motto Patriae Servio ("I serve the Country"). Orders Collars of the Order of the Elephant and of the Royal Order of the Seraphim Other versions

== See also ==
- List of presidents of Finland

Political offices
Preceded by Paavo Virkkunen	Speaker of the Parliament of Finland; 1919–1920	Succeeded by Kyösti Kallio
Preceded by Kaarlo Juho Ståhlberg	President of Finland; 2 March 1925 – 2 March 1931	Succeeded by Pehr Evind Svinhufvud
