= Signe Relander =

First Lady of Finland

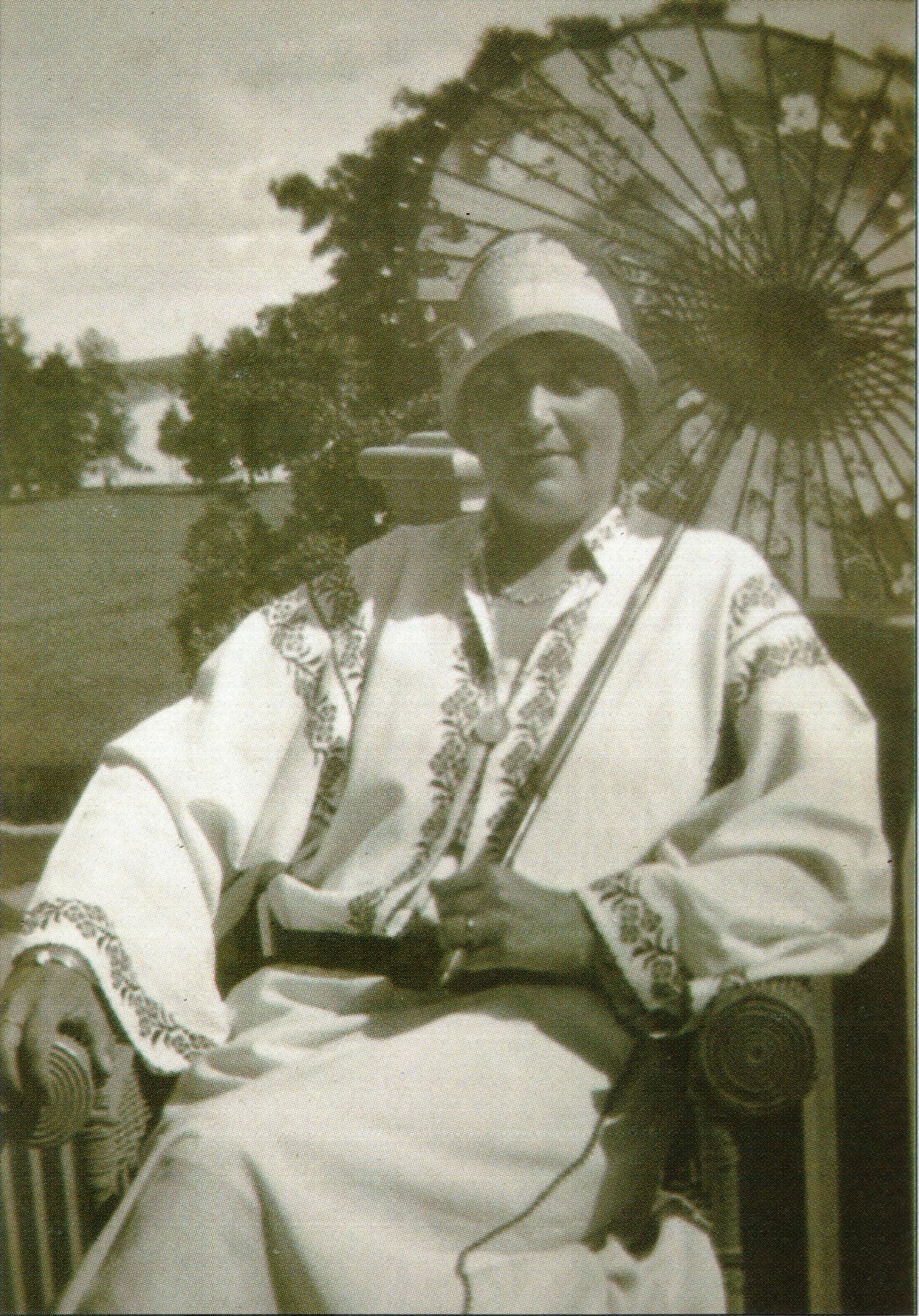
- Signe Relander in Kultaranta, in 1928
- Born: Signe Maria Österman; 19 August 1886; Helsinki, Grand Duchy of Finland
- Died: 31 May 1962 (aged 75); Helsinki, Finland
- Spouse: Lauri Kristian Relander (m. 1906; died 1942)

Signe Relander (née Österman; 19 August 1886 – 31 May 1962) was the wife of Finland's second president, Lauri Kristian Relander, serving as the First Lady of Finland from 1925 until 1931.

The couple met while she was still at secondary school and he at university, and married in 1906; they lived in Tikkurila (then part of the Rural District of Helsinki, now Vantaa), and had two children.

She considered her role as the First Lady to be purely ceremonial, and avoided commenting on or otherwise getting involved in politics. She was nevertheless known for her language skills and elegant appearance, and is thought to have been a positive influence on her husband's political career, both before and after his election as president. Her being natively Swedish-speaking may also have indirectly affected the language policies of her husband's party, the Agrarian League (now the Centre Party).

After her husband's death at the relatively young age of 58, Signe Relander suffered financial hardship, until a modest pension was granted to her.

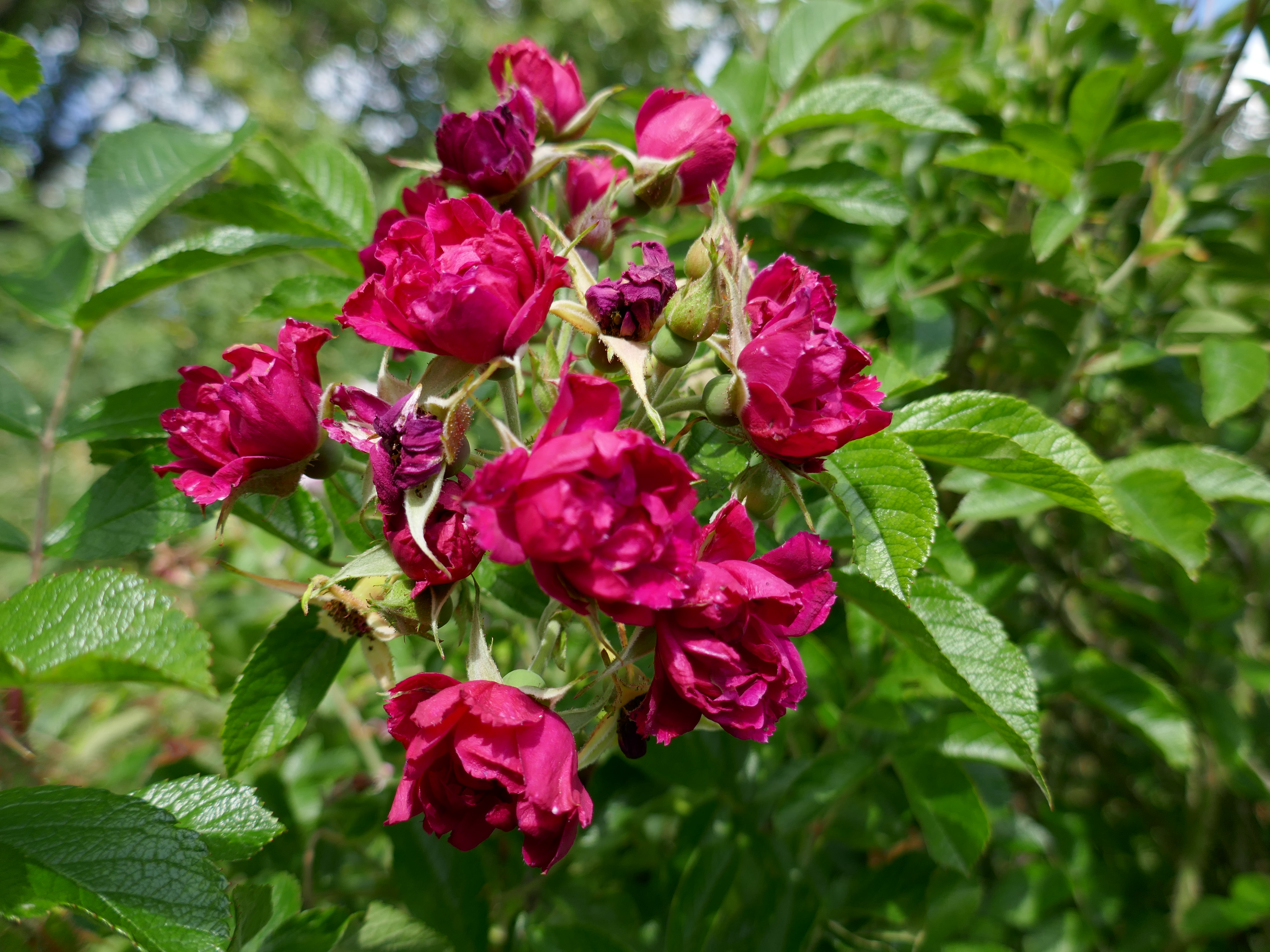
Eponymous rose cultivar Signe Relander
