= List of members of the European Parliament for Finland, 1999–2004 =

Members of the European Parliament for Finland
Delegation	(1995)
4th term	(1996)
5th term	(1999)
6th term	(2004)
7th term	(2009)
8th term	(2014)
9th term	(2019)
10th term	(2024)

This is a list of the 16 members of the European Parliament for Finland in the 1999 to 2004 session.

== List ==
Name	National party	EP Group	Votes
Heidi Hautala	Green League	G–EFA	115,502
Ulpu Iivari	Social Democratic Party	PES	24,091
Piia-Noora Kauppi	National Coalition Party	EPP–ED	18,221
Eija-Riitta Korhola	Christian League	EPP–ED	28,095
Marjo Matikainen-Kallström	National Coalition Party	EPP–ED	107,444
Riitta Myller	Social Democratic Party	PES	47,939
Reino Paasilinna	Social Democratic Party	PES	64,204
Mikko Pesälä	Centre Party	ELDR	24,281
Samuli Pohjamo	Centre Party	ELDR	25,333
Esko Seppänen	Left Alliance	EUL–NGL	59,954
Ilkka Suominen	National Coalition Party	EPP–ED	38,364
Astrid Thors	Swedish People's Party	ELDR	81,092
Paavo Väyrynen	Centre Party	ELDR	64,009
Ari Vatanen	National Coalition Party	EPP–ED	58,836
Kyösti Virrankoski	Centre Party	ELDR	50,075
Matti Wuori	Green League	G–EFA	26,846

=== Party representation ===
National party	EP Group	Seats	±
National Coalition Party	EPP–ED	4 / 16	Steady
Centre Party	ELDR	4 / 16	Steady
Social Democratic Party	PES	3 / 16	▼1
Green League	G–EFA	2 / 16	▲1
Left Alliance	EUL–NGL	1 / 16	▼1
Swedish People's Party	ELDR	1 / 16	Steady
Christian League	EPP–ED	1 / 16	▲1
