= List of members of the European Parliament for Finland, 1996–1999 =

Members of the European Parliament for Finland
Delegation	(1995)
4th term	(1996)
5th term	(1999)
6th term	(2004)
7th term	(2009)
8th term	(2014)
9th term	(2019)
10th term	(2024)

This is a list of the 16 members of the European Parliament for Finland in the 1994 to 1999 session.

== List ==
Name	National party	EP Group
Sirkka-Liisa Anttila	Centre Party	ELDR
Jörn Donner	Social Democratic Party	PES
Heidi Hautala	Green League	G–EFA
Raimo Ilaskivi	National Coalition Party	EPP
Marjo Matikainen-Kallström	National Coalition Party	EPP
Riitta Myller	Social Democratic Party	PES
Outi Ojala	Left Alliance	EUL–NGL
Jyrki Otila	National Coalition Party	EPP
Reino Paasilinna	Social Democratic Party	PES
Pertti Paasio	Social Democratic Party	PES
Kirsi Piha	National Coalition Party	EPP
Mirja Ryynänen	Centre Party	ELDR
Esko Seppänen	Left Alliance	EUL–NGL
Astrid Thors	Swedish People's Party	ELDR
Kyösti Virrankoski	Centre Party	ELDR
Paavo Väyrynen	Centre Party	ELDR

=== Party representation ===
National party	EP Group	Seats	±
Centre Party	ELDR	4 / 16	
Social Democratic Party	PES	4 / 16	
National Coalition Party	EPP	4 / 16	
Left Alliance	EUL–NGL	2 / 16	
Green League	G–EFA	1 / 16	
Swedish People's Party	ELDR	1 / 16	
