= List of members of the European Parliament for Finland, 1995–1996 =

Members of the European Parliament for Finland
Delegation	(1995)
4th term	(1996)
5th term	(1999)
6th term	(2004)
7th term	(2009)
8th term	(2014)
9th term	(2019)
10th term	(2024)

This is a list of the 16 appointed members of the European Parliament for Finland in the 1994 to 1999 session, from 1 January 1995 until 9 October 1996. The first direct elections were held on 10 October 1996.

== List ==
Name	National party	EP Group
Heidi Hautala	Green League	G
Ulpu Iivari	Social Democratic Party	PES
Riitta Jouppila	National Coalition Party	EPP
Timo Järvilahti	Centre Party	ELDR
Ritva Laurila	National Coalition Party	EPP
Riita Myller	Social Democratic Party	PES
Saara-Maria Paakkinen	Social Democratic Party	PES
Seppo Pelttari	Centre Party	ELDR
Elisabeth Rehn	Swedish People's Party	ELDR
Olli Rehn	Centre Party	ELDR
Pirjo Rusanen	National Coalition Party	EPP
Mirja Ryynänen	Centre Party	ELDR
Mikko Rönnholm	Social Democratic Party	PES
Marjatta Stenius-Kaukonen	Left Alliance	EUL–NGL
Kyösti Toivonen	National Coalition Party	EPP
Paavo Väyrynen	Centre Party	ELDR
