= List of members of the European Parliament for Finland, 2004–2009 =

Members of the European Parliament for Finland
Delegation	(1995)
4th term	(1996)
5th term	(1999)
6th term	(2004)
7th term	(2009)
8th term	(2014)
9th term	(2019)
10th term	(2024)

This is a list of the 14 members of the European Parliament for Finland in the 2004 to 2009 session.

== List ==
Name	National party	EP Group	Votes
Satu Hassi	Green League	G–EFA	74,714
Ville Itälä	National Coalition Party	EPP–ED	65,439
Anneli Jäätteenmäki	Centre Party	ALDE	149,646
Piia-Noora Kauppi	National Coalition Party	EPP–ED	62,995
Eija-Riitta Korhola	National Coalition Party	EPP–ED	35,285
Henrik Lax	Swedish People's Party	ALDE	32,707
Lasse Lehtinen	Social Democratic Party	PES	47,186
Riitta Myller	Social Democratic Party	PES	55,133
Reino Paasilinna	Social Democratic Party	PES	64,305
Esko Seppänen	Left Alliance	EUL–NGL	72,401
Alexander Stubb	National Coalition Party	EPP–ED	115,224
Hannu Takkula	Centre Party	ALDE	32,739
Paavo Väyrynen	Centre Party	ALDE	44,123
Kyösti Virrankoski	Centre Party	ALDE	51,415

=== Party representation ===
National party	EP Group	Seats	±
National Coalition Party	EPP–ED	4 / 14	Steady
Centre Party	ALDE	4 / 14	Steady
Social Democratic Party	PES	3 / 14	Steady
Green League	G–EFA	1 / 14	▼1
Left Alliance	EUL–NGL	1 / 14	Steady
Swedish People's Party	ALDE	1 / 14	Steady
