= List of members of the European Parliament for Finland, 2014–2019 =

Members of the European Parliament for Finland
Delegation	(1995)
4th term	(1996)
5th term	(1999)
6th term	(2004)
7th term	(2009)
8th term	(2014)
9th term	(2019)
10th term	(2024)

This is a list of the 13 members of the European Parliament for Finland in the 2014 to 2019 session.

== List ==
Name	National party	EP Group	Votes
Jussi Halla-aho	Finns Party	ECR	80,772
Heidi Hautala	Green League	G–EFA	31,725
Liisa Jaakonsaari	Social Democratic Party	S&D	44,061
Anneli Jäätteenmäki	Centre Party	ALDE	59,538
Miapetra Kumpula-Natri	Social Democratic Party	S&D	40,734
Merja Kyllönen	Left Alliance	GUE/NGL	58,611
Sirpa Pietikäinen	National Coalition Party	EPP	49,842
Olli Rehn	Centre Party	ALDE	70,398
Alexander Stubb	National Coalition Party	EPP	148,190
Sampo Terho	Finns Party	ECR	33,833
Nils Torvalds	Swedish People's Party	ALDE	29,355
Henna Virkkunen	National Coalition Party	EPP	43,829
Paavo Väyrynen	Centre Party	ALDE	69,360

=== Party representation ===
National party	EP Group	Seats	±
National Coalition Party	EPP	3 / 13	Steady
Centre Party	ALDE	3 / 13	Steady
Social Democratic Party	S&D	2 / 13	Steady
Finns Party	ECR	2 / 13	▲1
Green League	G–EFA	1 / 13	▼1
Swedish People's Party	ALDE	1 / 13	Steady
Left Alliance	GUE/NGL	1 / 13	▲1
Christian Democrats	EPP	0 / 13	▼1

== Midterm replacements ==
- Alexander Stubb declined his seat to become the Prime Minister of Finland. He was replaced by Petri Sarvamaa.
- Olli Rehn was replaced by Hannu Takkula in April 2015.
- Sampo Terho was replaced by Pirkko Ruohonen-Lerner in May 2015.
- Hannu Takkula was replaced by Elsi Katainen in March 2018.
- Paavo Väyrynen was replaced by Mirja Vehkaperä in June 2018.
