= List of members of the European Parliament for Finland, 2019–2024 =

This is a list of members of the European Parliament for Finland in the 2019 to 2024 session.

Members of the European Parliament for Finland
Delegation	(1995)
4th term	(1996)
5th term	(1999)
6th term	(2004)
7th term	(2009)
8th term	(2014)
9th term	(2019)
10th term	(2024)

== List ==
On the National Coalition Party list: (EPP Group)

1. Sirpa Pietikäinen
2. Petri Sarvamaa – until 31 May 2024
3. Henna Virkkunen
4. Eija-Riitta Korhola (Christian Democrats) – since 1 June 2024

On the Green League list: (Greens-EFA)

1. Heidi Hautala
2. Ville Niinistö
3. Alviina Alametsä – since Brexit (1 February 2020)

On the Social Democratic Party list: (S&D)

1. Eero Heinäluoma
2. Miapetra Kumpula-Natri

On the Finns Party list: (ID)

1. Teuvo Hakkarainen
2. Laura Huhtasaari – until 11 April 2023
3. Pirkko Ruohonen-Lerner – since 11 April 2023

On the Centre Party list: (Renew)

1. Elsi Katainen
2. Mauri Pekkarinen

On the Left Alliance list: (GUE–NGL)

1. Silvia Modig

On the Swedish People's Party of Finland list: (Renew)

1. Nils Torvalds

== See also ==
- 2019 European Parliament election in Finland
