= List of members of the European Parliament for Finland, 2024–2029 =

Members of the European Parliament for Finland
Delegation	(1995)
4th term	(1996)
5th term	(1999)
6th term	(2004)
7th term	(2009)
8th term	(2014)
9th term	(2019)
10th term	(2024)

This is a list of the 15 members of the European Parliament for Finland in the 2024 to 2029 session. The members were elected in the 2024 European Parliament election in Finland.

== List ==
Name	National party	EP Group	Preference votes
Mika Aaltola	National Coalition Party (Kok)	EPP	95,757
Pekka Toveri	National Coalition Party (Kok)	EPP	88,712
Aura Salla	National Coalition Party (Kok)	EPP	39,708
Sirpa Pietikäinen (Note: Henna Virkkunen was elected but refused to take her seat to become a European commissioner.)	National Coalition Party (Kok)	EPP	34,987
Li Andersson	Left Alliance (Vas)	GUE–NGL	247,723
Merja Kyllönen	Left Alliance (Vas)	GUE–NGL	27,072
Jussi Saramo	Left Alliance (Vas)	GUE–NGL	4,918
Eero Heinäluoma	Social Democratic Party of Finland (SDP)	S&D	96,669
Maria Guzenina	Social Democratic Party of Finland (SDP)	S&D	52,986
Elsi Katainen	Centre Party (Kesk)	RE	67,392
Katri Kulmuni	Centre Party (Kesk)	RE	67,028
Ville Niinistö	Green League (Vihr)	Greens/EFA	57,630
Maria Ohisalo	Green League (Vihr)	Greens/EFA	36,626
Sebastian Tynkkynen	Finns Party (PS)	ECR	34,069
Anna-Maja Henriksson	Swedish People's Party of Finland (RKP)	RE	50,074
