= List of members of the European Parliament for Finland, 2009–2014 =

Members of the European Parliament for Finland
Delegation	(1995)
4th term	(1996)
5th term	(1999)
6th term	(2004)
7th term	(2009)
8th term	(2014)
9th term	(2019)
10th term	(2024)

This is a list of the 13 members of the European Parliament for Finland in the 2009 to 2014 session.

== List ==
Name	National party	EP Group	Votes
Sari Essayah	Christian Democrats	EPP	53,803
Carl Haglund	Swedish People's Party	ALDE	16,887
Satu Hassi	Green League	G–EFA	57,032
Heidi Hautala	Green League	G–EFA	58,926
Ville Itälä	National Coalition Party	EPP	66,033
Liisa Jaakonsaari	Social Democratic Party	S&D	45,325
Anneli Jäätteenmäki	Centre Party	ALDE	80,156
Eija-Riitta Korhola	National Coalition Party	EPP	51,508
Riikka Manner	Centre Party	ALDE	37,330
Sirpa Pietikäinen	National Coalition Party	EPP	51,493
Mitro Repo	Social Democratic Party	S&D	71,829
Timo Soini	True Finns	EFD	130,715
Hannu Takkula	Centre Party	ALDE	39,444

=== Party representation ===
National party	EP Group	Seats	±
National Coalition Party	EPP	3 / 13	▼1
Centre Party	ALDE	3 / 13	▼1
Social Democratic Party	S&D	2 / 13	▼1
Green League	G–EFA	2 / 13	▲1
True Finns	EFD	1 / 13	▲1
Swedish People's Party	ALDE	1 / 13	Steady
Christian Democrats	EPP	1 / 13	▲1
