= Mirja Vehkaperä =

Finnish politician (born 1976)

Mirja Vehkaperä MEP
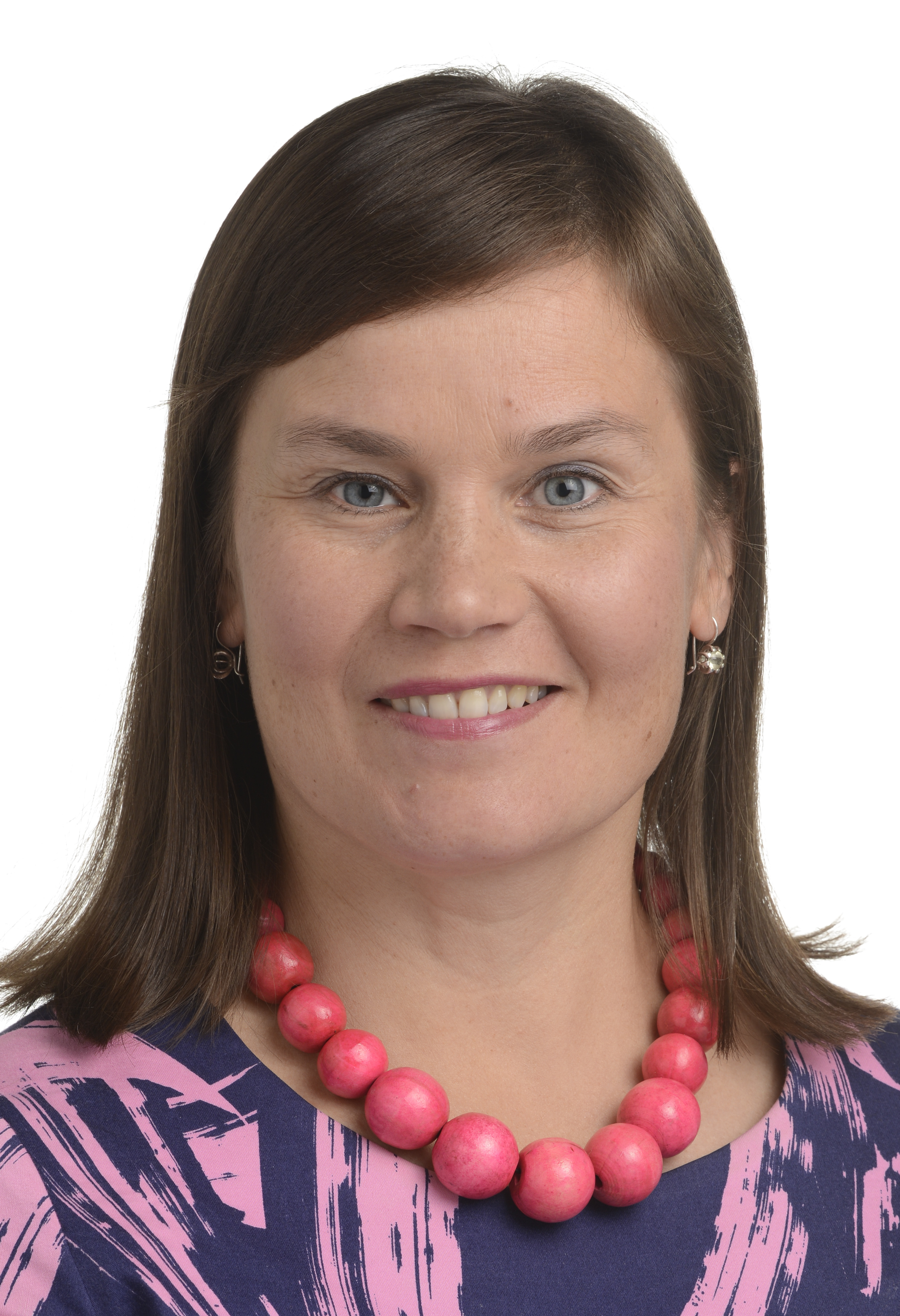

Member of the European Parliament
- In office 2018–2019
- Constituency: Finland

Member of the Finnish Parliament
- In office 21 March 2007 – 17 June 2018
- Constituency: Oulu

Personal details
- Born: 6 April 1976 (age 50) Haukipudas, Finland
- Party: Centre Party; ALDE
- Education: University of Oulu
- Website: www.mirjavehkapera.fi

Mirja Tellervo Vehkaperä (born 6 April 1976) is a Finnish politician who served as a Member of the European Parliament (MEP) from 2018 until 2019. She is a member of the Centre Party, part of the Alliance of Liberals and Democrats for Europe Party.

Vehkaperä was first elected to the parliament of Finland in 2007 from the constituency of Oulu and was later re-elected in 2011 and 2015 elections. She run to the European Parliament in the 2014 election, but wasn't elected.

In 2018, MEP Paavo Väyrynen left his seat prompting Vehkaperä to succeed him for the remainder of the term. Vehkaperä started in the European Parliament on 18 June 2018. She served as shadow rapporteur for a non-binding opinion on the renegotiation of treaties with Switzerland.
