= Otila =

Otila may refer to:

- Jyrki Otila, a Finnish quiz show host
- 913 Otila, an asteroid
