= Truth Party (Finland) =

Truth Party Totuuspuolue
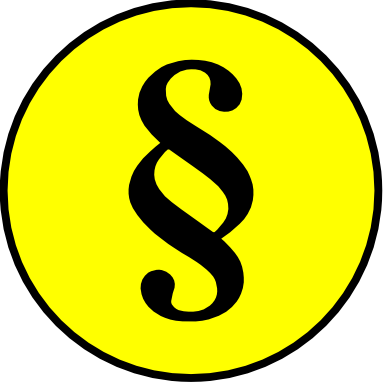
- Chairperson: Jaana Kavonius
- Secretary: Päivi Strömmer
- Founded: 26 April 2023
- Headquarters: Myllärinkatu 4, 08100 Lohja
- Ideology: National conservatism Right-wing populism Paasikivi–Kekkonen doctrine
- Political position: Far-right
- Colors: Yellow
- Slogan: To restore truth, justice and legality. (Finnish: Totuuden, oikeudenmukaisuuden ja laillisuuden palauttamiseksi.)
- Eduskunta: 0 / 200
- European Parliament: 0 / 15
- Municipalities: 0 / 8,859
- County seats: 0 / 1,379

Website
- https://www.totuuspuolue.net/

The Truth Party (Finnish: Totuuspuolue, abbr. TP) is a national conservative registered extra-parliamentary political party in Finland. The party was registered on 26 April 2023.

== Ideology ==
=== Social, internal, immigration and foreign policy ===
The Truth Party views that the European Union is illegal based on the Finnish Constitution, and seeks that Finland should leave the European Union. The party opposes the European Digital Identity, alongside corona and vaccine passports. The party wishes to leave NATO by reason of the Paasikivi–Kekkonen doctrine. The party wishes to make Finlandia the sole national anthem of Finland, replacing Maamme. The party supports good relations with the Russian Federation.

The party claims that the current immigration policy of the government will turn Finland into an illiberal democratic country where Finns are a minority. The party describes the Government as a mafia network, and wishes to hold people involved in "censorship, deliberate disinformation produced by mainstream media, state leadership and other official mafia networks", alongside people involved in selling government assets off-shore convicted of fraud.

=== Economic and environmental policy ===
The Truth Party wishes to abandon the euro, and restore the Finnish markka as the sole legal currency. The party wishes to promote self-sufficiency and to "return all wealth stolen from the Finnish people by the criminality of the official mafia network." The party opposes what it describes as "green-left fanaticism, globalist, communist, fascist and other totalitarian undemocratic use of power under the guise of green values", claiming that the actions of Finland in relation to climate change are ineffective. The party supports nature conservation efforts in the Baltic Sea, alongside biodiversity and animal protection activities.

== Controversy ==
The Chairperson of the Truth Party, Jaana Kavonius, has demanded the death penalty for former President Sauli Niinistö. She is also facing several charges of defamation, and may be looking at a prison sentence of around five years. Finnish authorities issued an arrest warrant for her in the autumn of 2023. After two years on the run, during which she unsuccessfully sought political asylum in Slovakia, Kavonius was arrested in October 2025.

== Election results ==
The party's only candidate in the 2024 European Parliament election in Finland received 807 votes and was not elected. During the 2024 campaign, the party did not allow its sole candidate to participate in a debate by Yle for extra-parliamentary parties.

=== European Parliament ===
Election	Votes	%	Seats	+/–	EP Group
2024	807	0.04 (#14)	0 / 15	–	
