= Mikko Pesälä =

Finnish politician (born 1938)

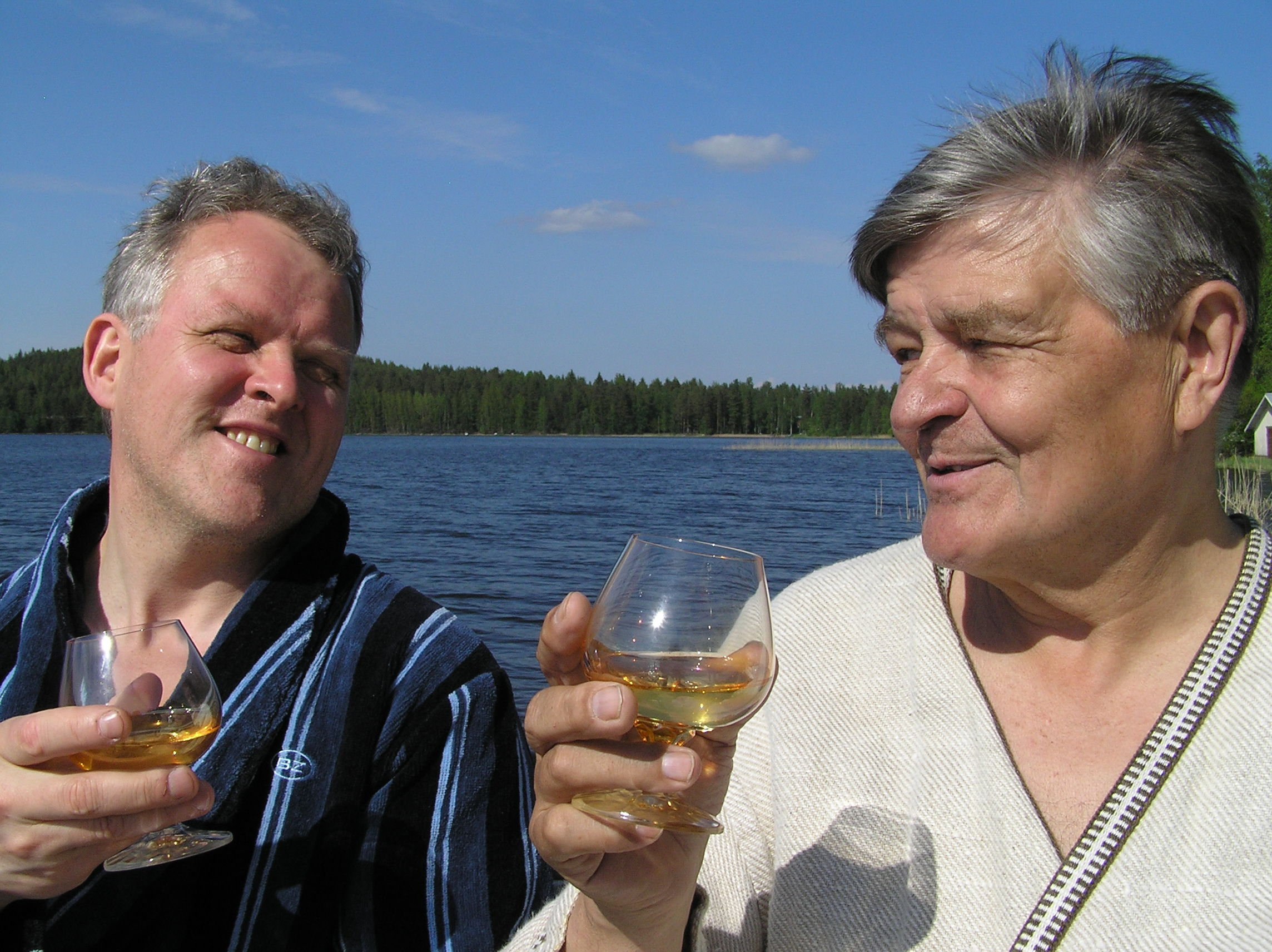
Mikko Pesälä (right)

Mikko Pesälä (born 30 November 1938 in Iitti) is a Finnish former politician who served as the Finnish member of the European Parliament. A farmer by trade, he served as a member of the Parliament of Finland for 24 years, from 1975 to 1999, representing the Centre Party. He also served as Minister of Agriculture and Forestry from 1994 to 1995.

In the election in 1999, Pesälä was elected a Member of the European Parliament (MEP), representing Finland and the ELDR. He declined to run for re-election in 2004 and withdrew from political life.
