= Samuli Pohjamo =

Finish politician and journalist (born 1950)

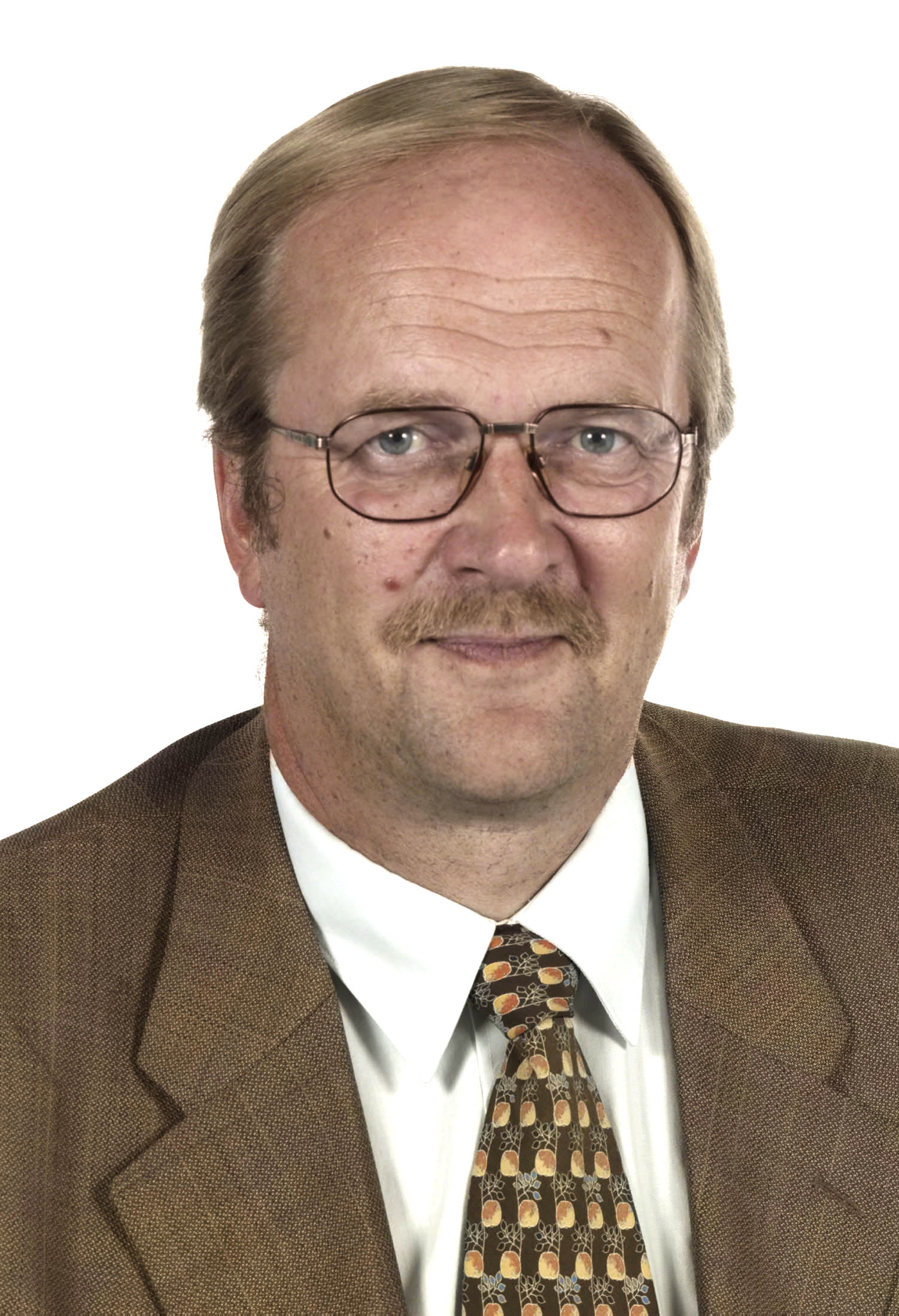
Pohjamo in 1999

Samuli Pohjamo (born 4 April 1950) is a Finnish Centre Party politician and journalist, born in Oulu. He has served as a Member of the European Parliament (MEP) from 1999 to 2004, and again from 19 April 2007.

In the spring of 1999, the Finnish MEP Sirkka-Liisa Anttila opted to resign three months before her term was up to accept a position in the Parliament of Finland. Pohjamo, having been second runner-up in the previous election (Olli Rehn, the first Centre Party runner-up, declined), became a member for the brief period until the next election, the following summer.

In the 1999 European Parliament elections, Pohjamo was re-elected with a 25,000 votes, most of them coming from his home region in Oulu. During his five-year term he served as a member of the Committee on Regional Development.

In the 2004 election, Pohjamo increased his tally of votes to 27,490, but his lack of nationwide support (only 3,000 of those votes came from outside the Oulu electoral district) caused him to fall short of the mark, becoming his party's first runner-up. When fellow Centre Party representative Paavo Väyrynen resigned his membership in the European Parliament to move into the position of Finland's Minister for Foreign Trade and Development, Pohjamo was once again raised from the position of runner-up into a parliament member.

Samuli Pohjamo has been an editor-in-chief in Suomenmaa.
