= Alviina Alametsä =

Finnish politician (born 1992)

Alviina Alametsä MEP
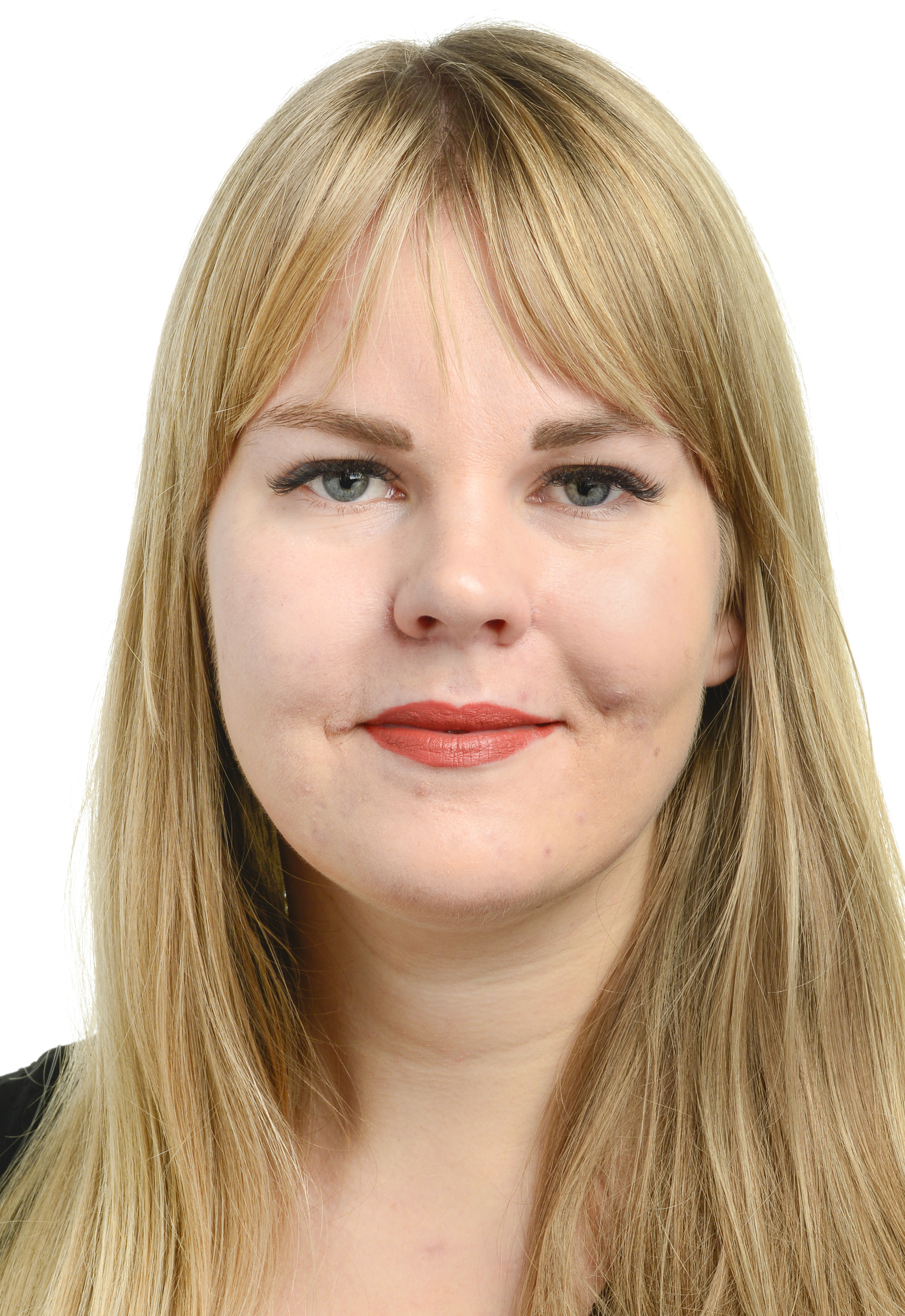

Member of the European Parliament
- In office 1 February 2020 – 15 July 2024
- Constituency: Finland

Member of the Finnish Parliament for Helsinki
- Incumbent
- Assumed office 16 July 2024
- Parliamentary group: Green

Personal details
- Born: Alviina Viivi Alametsä; 29 September 1992 (age 33) Tampere
- Education: University of Helsinki

Alviina Viivi Alametsä (born 29 September 1992) is a Finnish politician of the Green League who has been representing the Helsinki electoral district in the Finnish Parliament since 2024. She was a Member of the European Parliament from 2020 to 2024.

Before entering European politics, Alametsä has been a city councillor of Helsinki and chairs its equality committee. She works as a project leader in the mental health organization Mental Health Partnership Finland (Mielenterveyspooli).

== Education and career ==
In 2011, Alametsä graduated from Jokela High School. She was a ninth-grader there when the Jokela school shooting happened.

Alametsä studied political science at the University of Helsinki from 2011 to 2014 graduating with a specialization in world politics. During her university studies, she was active in the student union and governance bodies, participating in several of their business ventures.

After graduating from university, Alametsä worked at the Crisis Management Initiative, and then from 2017 to 2018 as an assistant of Pekka Haavisto in the Finnish Parliament.

== Political career ==
As a candidate for the Green League, Alametsä was elected to the Helsinki city council in 2017, after an unsuccessful attempt in 2012. She ran unsuccessfully for parliament twice in 2015 and 2019. During that time, Alametsä campaigned for a law improving mental health issues.

Later in 2019 Alametsä received enough votes to become the alternative member for Finland in the European Parliament – meaning that she only became an MEP until after an additional seat was allocated to for Finland due to Brexit.

Since taking up her seat in parliament, Alametsä has been serving on the Committee on Foreign Affairs. In addition to her committee assignments, she is part of the parliament’s delegation to ACP–EU Joint Parliamentary Assembly.
