= Pirjo Rusanen =

Finnish politician (born 1940)

Pirjo Rusanen (born 18 December 1940, in Mikkeli) is a retired Finnish politician.

Rusanen studied business and economics, graduating in 1970, and went on to qualify as a certified accountant. She subsequently lectured for many years in management accounting.

She served as a Mikkeli City Councillor for over two decades, from 1973 until 1995.

Rusanen was elected to Parliament from the Mikkeli constituency (now Southern Savonia), representing the National Coalition Party, and serving for three terms until 1995.

She also served as an inaugural Finnish Member of European Parliament upon Finland's accession to the EU, from January 1995 until November 1996.
