= Jyrki Otila =

Finnish quiz show judge and Member of the European Parliament

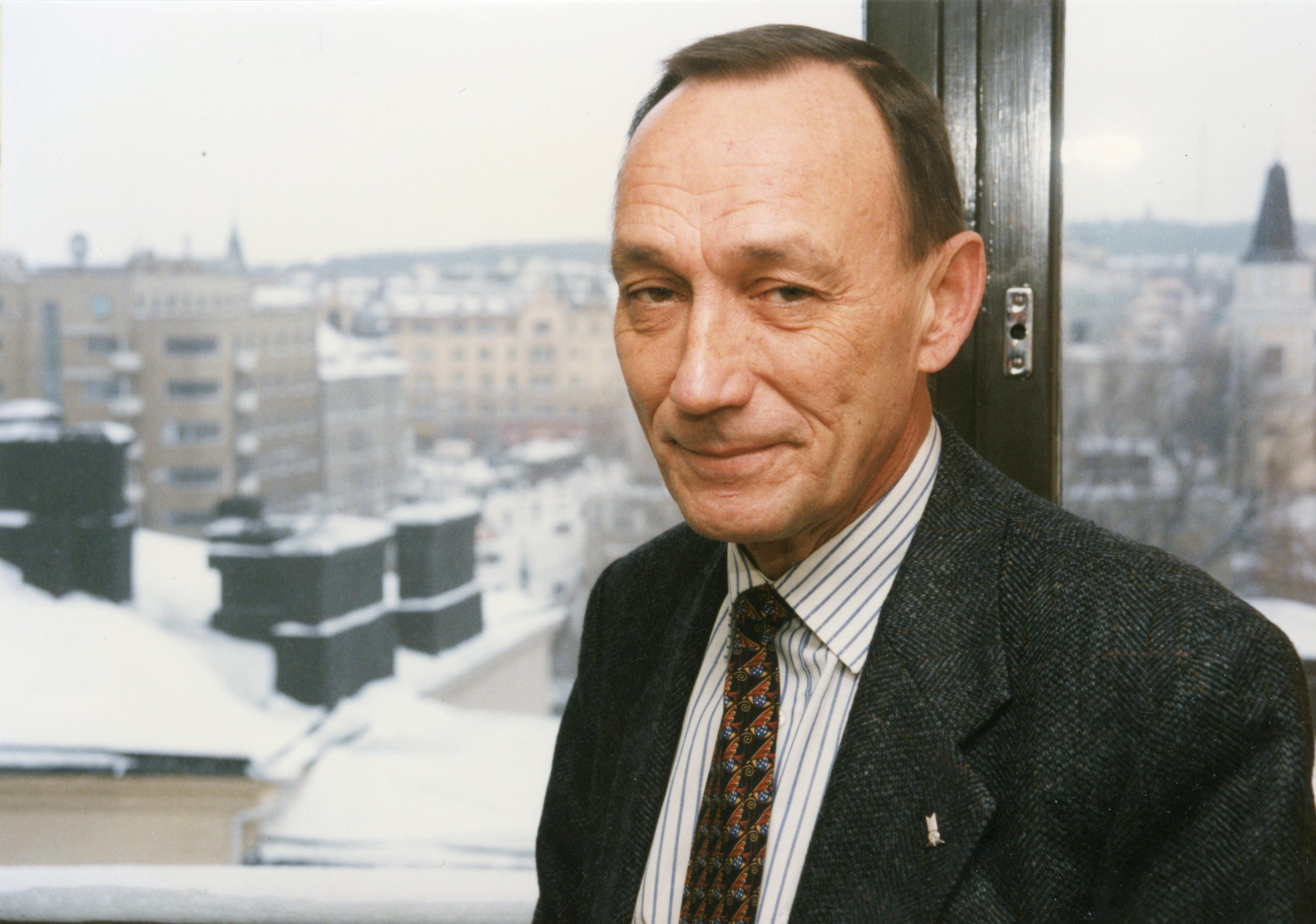
Jyrki Otila in 1997.

Jyrki Ilari Otila (2 September 1941, in Helsinki – 14 April 2003, in Tampere) was a Finnish quiz show judge and a member of the European Parliament.

Otila graduated as an economist. He became popular as the judge of several quiz shows on television. Otila worked as assistant office chief for the Finnish national public broadcasting company Yle from 1965 to 1970, in the United Nations in Dar es Salaam, Tanzania, from 1970 to 1973, in Yle in 1974, in the Ministry for Foreign Affairs as a development aid expert in Tanzania from 1975 to 1977, and as a factory chief for the Orion Corporation in Arusha, Tanzania, from 1977 to 1980.

Otila wrote questions for Yle TV2's quiz show Thilia Thalia Tallallaa from 1982 until moving to work on quizzes for the new channel Kolmoskanava. He worked as assistant chairman of the board of Oy VipVision Finland Ltd. from 1995. Thilia Thalia Tallallaa was continued in 1998. At the Kolmoskanava and Neloskanava channels, Otila was involved in the production of the quiz shows Kolmosvisa, Tietopörssi and Nelosvisa. He was often paired with the television presenter Reijo Salminen. Otila was himself a skilled quiz show contestant and finished in third place in the Suomen Tietoviisas quiz in 1994.

Otila was elected as a member of the European Parliament from Finland for the years 1996 to 1999 (National Coalition Party), where he was a member of the Committee on Regional Policy and an alternate member of the Committee on Agricultural Policy.

Otila died of cancer on 14 April 2003. He had been diagnosed with oral cancer in the summer of 1999. He was declared cancer-free in early 2001 before the disease ultimately returned.

== Offices ==
- Suomen Veteraanijääkiekkoliitto, member of the board, 1983–2003
- Suomen Jääkiekkomuseoyhdistys, member of the board, 1984–2003
- Kansainvälinen Jääkiekkoliitto, member of the veteran ice hockey committee, 1992–2003
- Suomi-Hong Kong kauppayhdistys, member of the board, 1984
- Olutliitto, chairman of the board, from 2000
- Suomen syöpäpotilaat RY
