= Matti Wuori =

Finnish lawyer, writer and politician

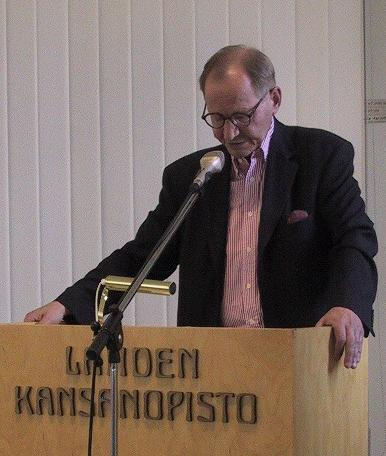

Member of the European Parliament
- In office 1999–2004
- Constituency: Finland

Personal details
- Born: July 16, 1945 Helsinki Finland
- Died: October 15, 2005 (aged 60) Kirkkonummi, Finland
- Party: Green League

Matti Ossian Wuori (July 16, 1945 in Helsinki – October 15, 2005) was a Finnish lawyer, politician, and Member of the European Parliament (MEP) for the Green League in 1999–2004.

His father died early which left his mother to raise him while running a kiosk. Wuori graduated from the University of Helsinki and became active in cultural and political movements since the late 1960s. He reported annually about the state of international human rights during his term in the European Parliament.

Wuori was the chairman of Greenpeace Finland, 1989–1998, and Greenpeace International, 1991–1991.

Wuori died after a long battle with cancer.

== Trivia ==
Wuori had a cameo role in Aki Kaurismäki's film The Man Without a Past. He loved cigars and owned many ties.
