= Ulpu Iivari =

Finnish politician (born 1948)

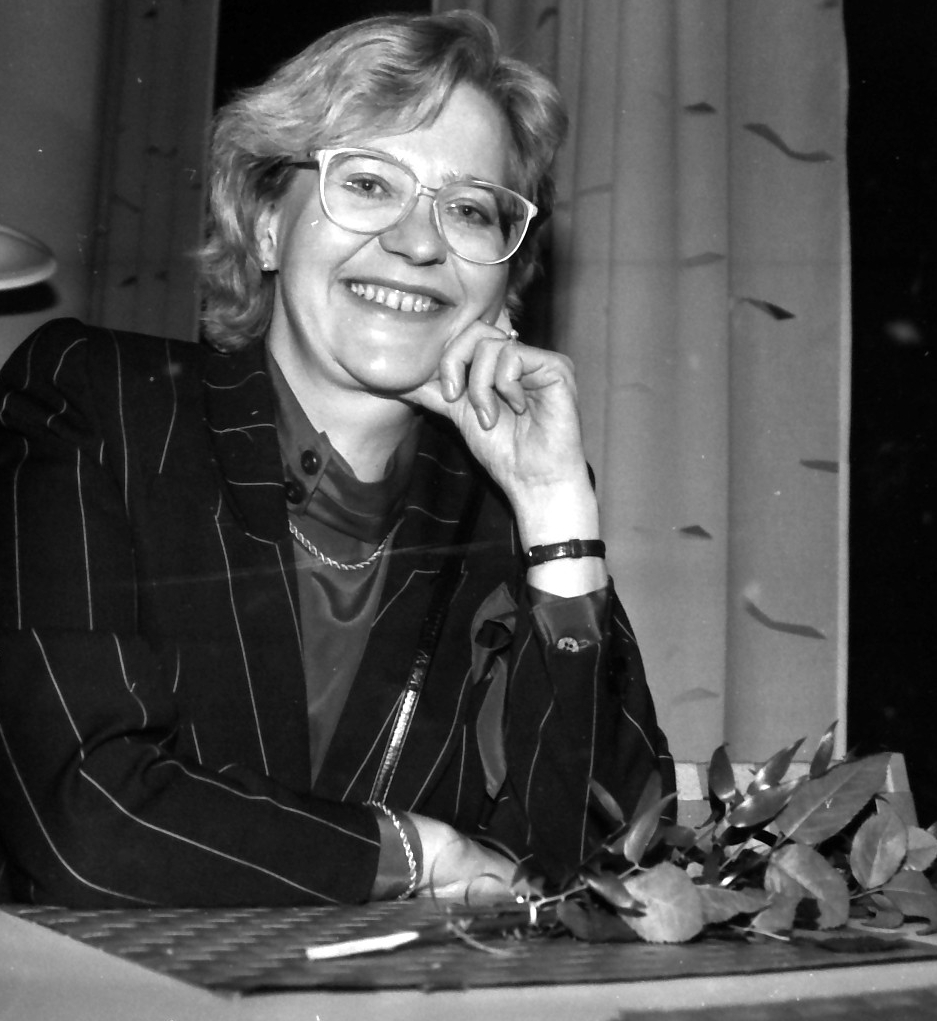
Ulpu Iivari

Ulpu Iivari (born 20 March 1948 in Salla) is a Finnish Social-Democrat politician and former Member of the European Parliament (MEP). A journalist by education, Iivari began her political career as a representative in the Finnish Parliament for one term from 1991 to 1995, when she moved into the European Parliament.

Iivari did not win a seat at the 2004 election. She withdrew from politics and currently works as a consultant in the communications industry.
