= Kyösti Virrankoski =

Finnish politician (1944–2026)

Kyösti Tapio Virrankoski
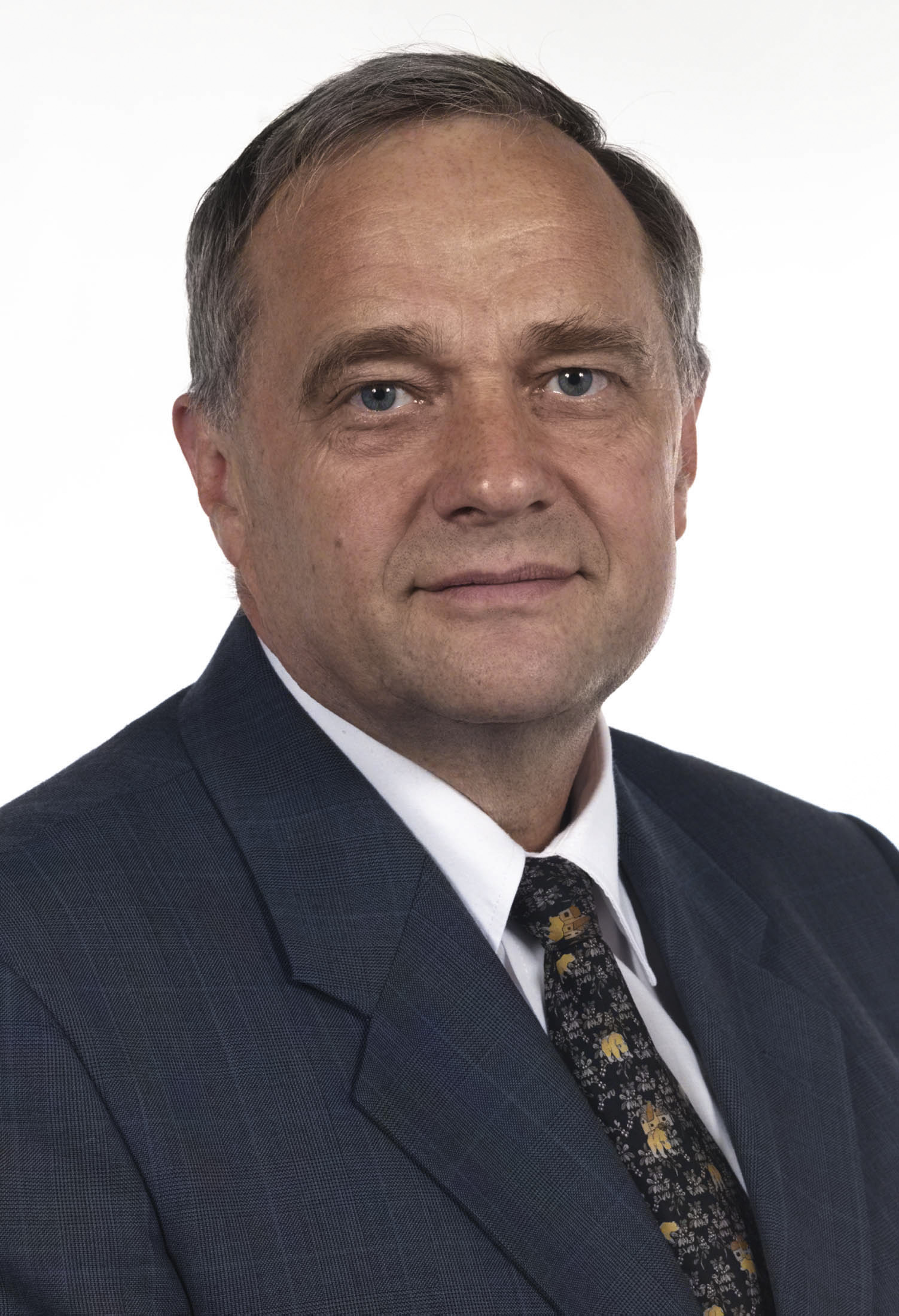
- Virrankoski in 1999

Member of the European Parliament for Finland
- In office 1996–2009

Member of the Finnish Parliament
- In office 22 March 1991 – 23 March 1995

Personal details
- Born: 4 April 1944 Kauhava, Finland
- Died: 21 May 2026 (aged 82) Kauhava, Finland
- Children: 3
- Parent(s): Väinö Virrankoski & Impi Kleemola
- Education: University of Helsinki

Kyösti Tapio Virrankoski (4 April 1944 – 21 May 2026) was a Finnish politician. He was member of the Finnish parliament and Member of the European Parliament (MEP) with the Centre Party of Finland, part of the Alliance of Liberals and Democrats for Europe and sat on the European Parliament's Committee on Agriculture and Rural Development and its Committee on Budgetary Control and the Committee on Budgets.

== Life and career ==
Virrankoski was born in Kauhava, Finland on 4 April 1944. His parents were Väinö Antti Virrankoski (1906–69) and Impi Irja Ireene Virrankoski (Kleemola) (1906–92). He was the last of five children. His oldest brother, Antti Aimo Kullervo Virrankoski (1927–1992) was the municipal chairman of Lapua.

In 1972, he received a bachelor's degree in philosophy from Helsinki University.

Virrankoski was married and had three children. He died in Kauhava on 21 May 2026, at the age of 82.

== Positions held ==
- 1968–1974: Teacher of mathematics and natural sciences
- 1987–1991 and 1995–1996: lecturer in mathematics (1974–1983)
- political secretary to the Defence Minister
- 1973–2000: Member of the Kauhava municipal and subsequently town council
- 1977–1989: Member of the Kauhava municipal and subsequently town executive
- 1990–1999: Chairman of the Kauhava town council
- 1993–2000: Chairman of the Southern Bothnia Regional Council
- 1991–1995: Member of Parliament
- 1994–1995: Member of Finland's delegation to the Nordic Council
- 1996–2009: Member of the European Parliament
- posts held at the European Parliament
- 2004–2009: Member of the Temporary Committee on Policy Challenges and Budgetary Means of the Enlarged Union
- 1996–1999: Member of the Delegation for Relations with the Mashreq countries
- 1999–2001: Member of the Delegation for Relations with Estonia
- 2001–2004: Member of the Delegation for Relations with Romania

== See also ==
- 2004 European Parliament election in Finland
