= 1999 European Parliament election in Finland =

- 13 June 1999

14 seats to the European Parliament

An election of the delegation from Finland to the European Parliament was held in 1999.

The National Coalition Party won these elections and have won every EU election since, As of 2024.

== Results ==
Party	Votes	%	Seats	+/–
National Coalition Party	313,960	25.27	4	0
Centre Party	264,640	21.30	4	0
Social Democratic Party	221,836	17.86	3	–1
Green League and Independents	166,786	13.43	2	+1
Left Alliance	112,757	9.08	1	–1
Swedish People's Party	84,153	6.77	1	0
Christian League	29,637	2.39	1	+1
Kirjava ”Puolue”	29,215	2.35	0	New
Finns Party	9,854	0.79	0	0
Communist Party of Finland	7,556	0.61	0	New
Retirees for the People	1,909	0.15	0	0
Total	1,242,303	100.00	16	0
Valid votes	1,242,303	99.53		
Invalid/blank votes	5,819	0.47		
Total votes	1,248,122	100.00		
Registered voters/turnout	4,141,098	30.14		
Source: Tilastokeskus

=== Most voted-for candidates ===
Candidate	Party	Votes
Heidi Hautala	Green League	115,502
Marjo Matikainen-Kallström	National Coalition Party	107,444
Astrid Thors	Swedish People's Party	81,092
Reino Paasilinna	Social Democratic Party.	64,204
Paavo Väyrynen	Centre Party	64,009
Esko Seppänen	Left Alliance	59,954
Ari Vatanen	National Coalition Party	58,836
Kyösti Virrankoski	Centre Party	50,075
Riitta Myller	Social Democratic Party	47,939
Ilkka Suominen	National Coalition Party	38,364
Eija-Riitta Korhola	Christian Democrats	28,095
Pertti "Veltto" Virtanen	Kirjava ”Puolue”	28,092
Matti Wuori	Green League	26,846
Samuli Pohjamo	Centre Party	25,333
Mikko Pesälä	Centre Party	24,281
Ulpu Iivari	Social Democratic Party	24,091
Piia-Noora Kauppi	National Coalition Party	18,221
Satu Procopé	Centre Party	17,037
Timo Kaunisto	Centre Party	16,307
Jyrki Otila	National Coalition Party	16,205
Antti Pentikäinen	Centre Party	16,099
Rauno Meriö	National Coalition Party	15,370
Inna Ilivitzky	Left Alliance	14,901
Miapetra Kumpula	Social Democratic Party	13,985
Pirjo Siiskonen	Centre Party	12,825
Source: Tilastokeskus
