= 1996 European Parliament election in Finland =

- 20 October 1996

16 seats to the European Parliament

The 1996 European Parliament election in Finland was the first election of the Finnish delegation to the European Parliament.

== Background ==
In 1996, Finland had a population of 5.1 million (4.1 million voters). The government was a broad coalition led by the social democrat Paavo Lipponen. The governing coalition consisted of: the Social Democrats (SDP), The National Coalition Party (Kokoomus), the Left Alliance (Vasemmistoliitto), The Swedish People's Party (SFP) and the Greens (Vihreä liitto).

== Composition before election ==
- ELDR Group (6): Elisabeth Rehn, Mirja Ryynänen*, Olli Rehn*, Paavo Väyrynen*, Seppo Pelttari, Timo Järvilahti.
- PES Group (4): Mikko Rönnholm*, Riitta Myller*, Saara-Maria Paakkinen, Ulpu Iivari*.
- EPP Group (4): Pirjo Rusanen*, Riitta Jouppila*, Ritva Laurila*, Kyösti Toivonen*
- EUL/NGL Group (1): Marjatta Stenius-Kaukonen.
- Green Group (1): Heidi Hautala*.

An asterisk (*) indicates members standing for re-election.

== Electoral system ==
All Finnish citizens that were 18 years old on the election day at the latest, were eligible to vote. They did not have to register as it was done automatically by the authorities. Other citizens of the European Union who had a domicile in Finland on 30 August 1996 were eligible to vote, although they had to register as voters in Finland and confirm that they did not vote in any other member state during the elections in 1994 and 1995, and would not vote in Austria in 1996.

According to the Finnish Population Register Center (Väestörekisterikeskus) there were at the end of August 1996 some 72600 foreigners living in Finland. Biggest national groups willing to vote were citizens of Sweden, Germany and the United Kingdom. The final date for the registration was 15 August 1996.

In June Väestrekisterikeskus approached with an official letter all the EU nationals living in Finland. The letter was in Finnish, Swedish, English, French and German.

In the European elections candidates could be nominated by the registered political parties and citizens' groups. The parties could do the nomination automatically. The other groups had to gather supporting signatures for each of their candidates from each of the four election districts i.e. each candidate must have had 4 x 1000 supporting signatures. This meant that a non-party organization wanting to nominate the maximum number (16) of candidates had to collect 64000 signatures altogether.

The parties and other groups could choose between two different systems. They could nominate candidates for the whole country or for a region. For the elections Finland was divided into four districts. However, all the parties nominated candidates for the whole country.

The deadline for the parties and other organizations to put forward candidates was 19 September 1996. There were 14 parties and one other organization in the elections. The total number of candidates was 207.

== Parties running in the election ==
=== Parties represented in the EP ===
- SDP : The Finnish Social Democratic Party
- Keskusta: Finnish Center Party
- Kokoomus: The National Coalition Party
- Vasemmistoliitto: The Left Alliance
- SFP/RKP: The Swedish People's Party
- Vihreät: The Greens

=== Parties not represented in the EP ===
- SKL/Kristillinen liitto: Finnish Christian Union
- PS/Perussuomalaiset: True Finns
- NUSU/Nuorsuomalaiset: Young Finns
- Liberaalinen Kansanpuolue: Liberal Party
- Suomen Eläkeläisten Puolue: Pensioners
- Luonnonlain Puolue: Law of Nature
- Vaihtoehto EU:Lle: Anti-EU Movement

== Results ==
Party	Votes	%	Seats
Centre Party	548,041	24.36	4
Social Democratic Party	482,577	21.45	4
National Coalition Party	453,729	20.17	4
Left Alliance	236,490	10.51	2
Green League	170,670	7.59	1
Swedish People's Party	129,425	5.75	1
Young Finns	68,134	3.03	0
Christian League	63,279	2.81	0
Alternative to the EU	47,687	2.12	0
Finns Party	15,004	0.67	0
Alliance for Free Finland	13,746	0.61	0
Liberal People's Party	8,305	0.37	0
Finnish Pensioners' Party	6,357	0.28	0
Natural Law Party	3,327	0.15	0
Retirees for the People	2,640	0.12	0
Total	2,249,411	100.00	16
Valid votes	2,249,411	95.05	
Invalid/blank votes	117,093	4.95	
Total votes	2,366,504	100.00	
Registered voters/turnout	4,108,703	57.60	
Source: Tilastokeskus

== See also ==
- 1994 Finnish European Union membership referendum
