= 2004 European Parliament election in Finland =

← 1999	13 June 2004	2009 →

14 seats to the European Parliament

The 2004 European Parliament election in Finland was the election of MEP representing Finland constituency for the 2004-2009 term of the European Parliament. It was part of the wider 2004 European election. The vote took place on 13 June. Both the Finnish Social Democratic Party and the Finnish Centre Party improved their vote at the expense of the conservative National Coalition Party and the Greens.

== Results ==
Party	Votes	%	Seats	+/–
National Coalition Party	392,771	23.71	4	0
Centre Party	387,217	23.37	4	0
Social Democratic Party	350,525	21.16	3	0
Green League and Independents	172,844	10.43	1	–1
Left Alliance	151,291	9.13	1	0
Swedish People's Party	94,421	5.70	1	0
Christian Democrats	70,845	4.28	0	–1
Communist Party of Finland	10,134	0.61	0	0
Finns Party	8,900	0.54	0	0
For the Poor	5,687	0.34	0	New
Liberals	3,558	0.21	0	New
Retirees for the People	3,279	0.20	0	0
Finnish People's Blue-Whites	3,248	0.20	0	New
Finland – Fatherland	1,864	0.11	0	New
Total	1,656,584	100.00	14	–2
Valid votes	1,656,584	99.38		
Invalid/blank votes	10,348	0.62		
Total votes	1,666,932	100.00		
Registered voters/turnout	4,227,987	39.43		
Source: Tilastokeskus

=== Most voted-for candidates ===
Candidate	Party	Votes	Change
Anneli Jäätteenmäki	Centre Party	149,646	
Alexander Stubb	National Coalition Party	115,224	
Satu Hassi	Green League	74,714	
Esko Seppänen	Left Alliance	72,401	+12,447
Ville Itälä	National Coalition Party	65,439	
Reino Paasilinna	Social Democratic Party	64,305	+101
Piia-Noora Kauppi	National Coalition Party	62,995	+44,774
Riitta Myller	Social Democratic Party	55,133	+7,194
Kyösti Virrankoski	Centre Party	51,415	+1,340
Lasse Lehtinen	Social Democratic Party	47,186	
Paavo Väyrynen	Centre Party	44,123	
Outi Ojala	Left Alliance	37,053	
Ulpu Iivari	Social Democratic Party	35,399	
Eija-Riitta Korhola	National Coalition Party	35,285	
Hannu Takkula	Centre Party	32,739	
Henrik Lax	Swedish People's Party	32,707	
Sirpa Pietikäinen	National Coalition Party	30,042	
Antero Kekkonen	Social Democratic Party	28,414	
Samuli Pohjamo	Centre Party	27,490	
Matti Wuori	Green League	24,580	
Source: Stat.fi
