= Paavo Väyrynen =

Finnish politician (born 1946)

Paavo Väyrynen MP
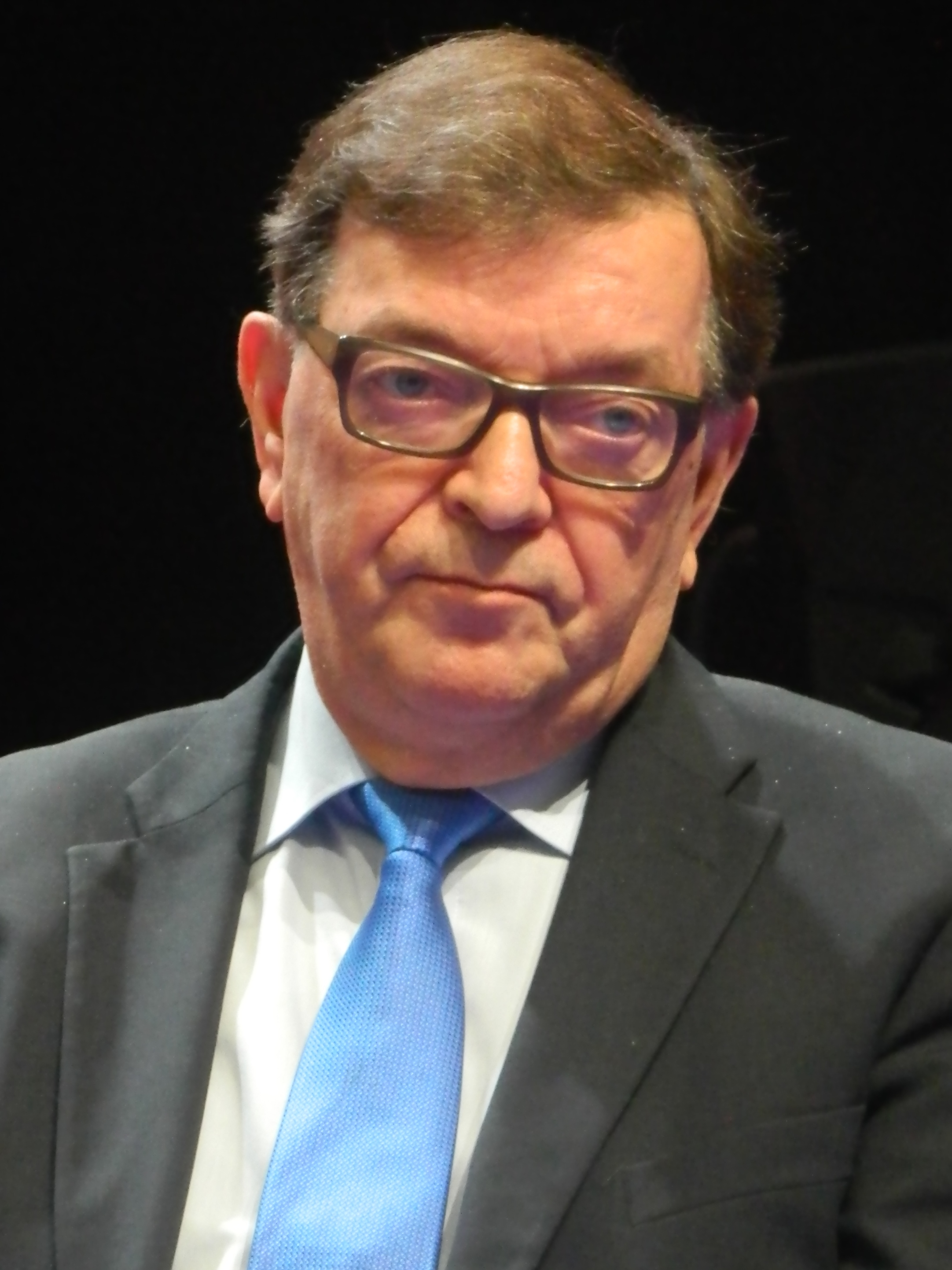
- Väyrynen in 2017

Member of the European Parliament for Finland
- In office 1 July 2014 – 11 June 2018
- In office 1 January 1995 – 26 November 2007

Minister for Foreign Trade and International Development
- In office 19 April 2007 – 22 June 2011
- Prime Minister: Matti Vanhanen; Mari Kiviniemi
- Preceded by: Paula Lehtomäki
- Succeeded by: Alexander Stubb (Foreign Trade); Heidi Hautala (International Development)

Minister of Foreign Affairs
- In office 26 April 1991 – 5 May 1993
- Prime Minister: Esko Aho
- Preceded by: Pertti Paasio
- Succeeded by: Heikki Haavisto
- In office 6 May 1983 – 30 April 1987
- Prime Minister: Kalevi Sorsa
- Preceded by: Pär Stenbäck
- Succeeded by: Kalevi Sorsa
- In office 15 May 1977 – 26 February 1982
- Prime Minister: Kalevi Sorsa; Mauno Koivisto
- Preceded by: Keijo Korhonen
- Succeeded by: Pär Stenbäck

Deputy Prime Minister of Finland
- In office 6 May 1983 – 30 April 1987
- Prime Minister: Kalevi Sorsa
- Preceded by: Ahti Pekkala
- Succeeded by: Kalevi Sorsa

Minister of Labour
- In office 29 September 1976 – 15 May 1977
- Prime Minister: Martti Miettunen
- Preceded by: Paavo Aitio
- Succeeded by: Arvo Aalto

Minister of Education
- In office 30 November 1975 – 29 September 1976
- Prime Minister: Martti Miettunen
- Preceded by: Lauri Posti
- Succeeded by: Marjatta Väänänen

Member of the Finnish Parliament
- In office 18 June 2018 – 16 April 2019
- In office 19 March 1970 – 1 July 2014
- Constituency: Lapland

Personal details
- Born: Paavo Matti Väyrynen; 2 September 1946 (age 80) Kemin maalaiskunta, Finland
- Party: Centre; Citizens' Party; Seven Star Movement
- Spouse: Vuokko Tervonen (1968–present)
- Children: 3
- Education: University of Helsinki; Åbo Akademi University
- Website: Official website

Paavo Matti Väyrynen (Finnish pronunciation: [ˈpɑːʋo ˈmɑtːi ˈʋæy̯rynen]; born 2 September 1946) is a Finnish politician who has served, among other things, as Minister of Foreign Affairs from 1977 to 1982, and again from 1983 to 1987 and from 1991 to 1993. He is a former member of the Finnish Parliament who has represented the Seven Star Movement, the Citizen's Party and Centre Party. He left the Centre Party in 2023.

Väyrynen has been a member of the Finnish Parliament previously from 1970 to 1995, and again from 2007 to 2011 and has held many ministerial portfolios. He has also been a Member of the European Parliament from 1995 to 2007, and again from 2014 to 2018.

Väyrynen has been the Centre Party candidate for Finnish president three times – finishing second in 1988, third in 1994 and third in 2012. In both 2018 and 2024, he ran as an independent candidate. In October 2025, Väyrynen announced that he would no longer run as a presidential candidate in the 2030 presidential election.

== Early life ==
Paavo Väyrynen was born in a farmer family in Kemin maalaiskunta, southwest Lapland. After finishing his gymnasium, he graduated in 1970 as a Bachelor of Social Sciences in the University of Helsinki. In Väyrynen's doctoral thesis in 1988, Finlands utrikespolitik – den nationella doktrinen och framtidens mänsklighetspolitik ("Foreign politics of Finland - the national doctrine and the politics of the future of mankind"), he made an assumption that the Soviet Union would prevail — an assumption which has haunted him in the media ever since. In 1996, Väyrynen was granted docentship of International Relations in University of Lapland.

== Early political career ==
Väyrynen skyrocketed to the top of Finnish politics in his early years. He was elected to the Finnish Parliament in 1970 elections. He was immediately chosen to work as a Secretary of Ahti Karjalainen's cabinet. The 25-year-old Väyrynen was elected as the Vice Chairman of the Finnish Centre Party in 1972, and only three years later he began his long ministerial career as the Minister of Education.

The rising politician captured the attention of President Kekkonen. He soon became one of Kekkonen's trusted associates and a defender of his foreign policies.

== Career ==
=== Young chairman of the Centre Party ===
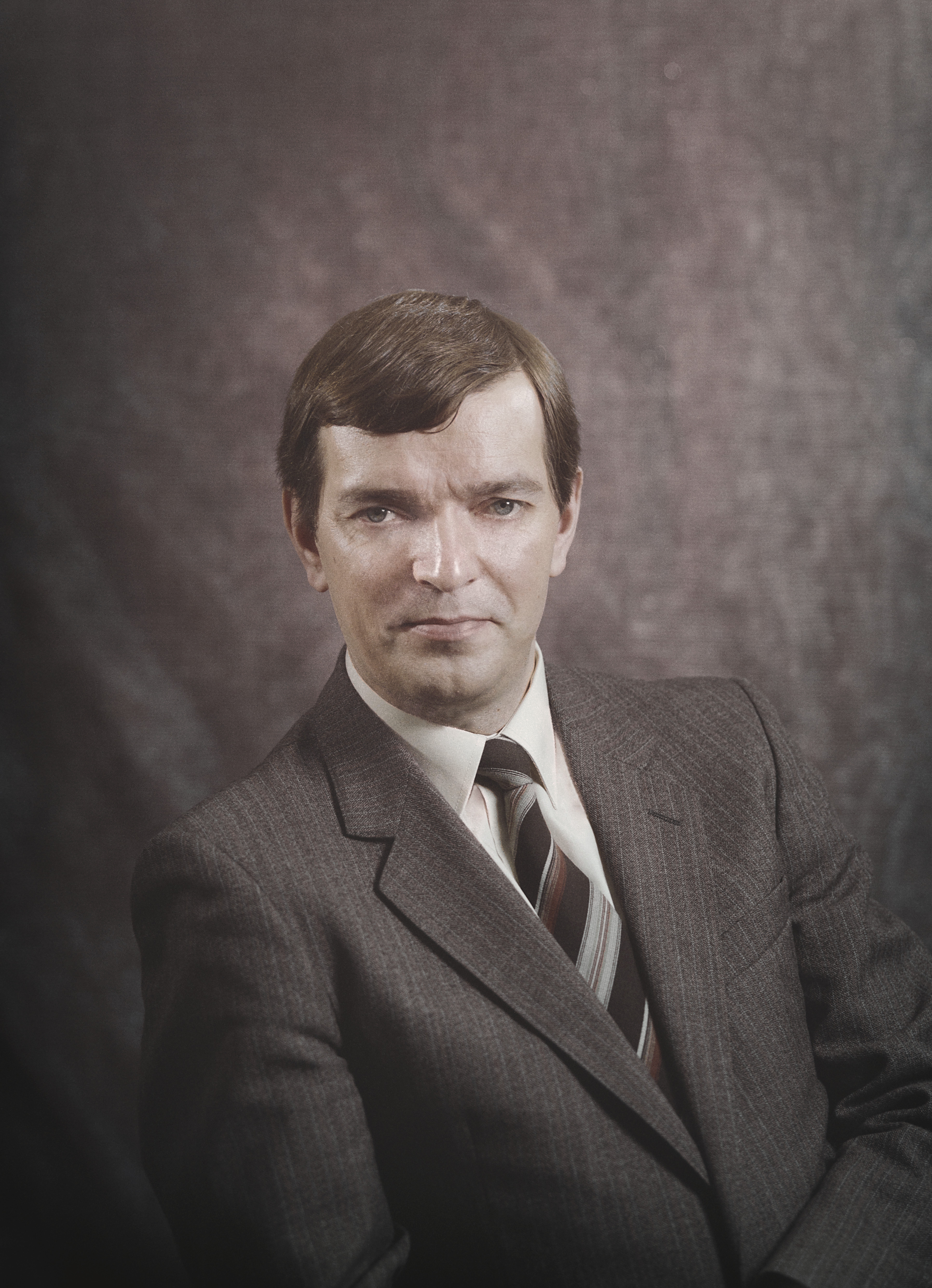
Väyrynen in 1982

Paavo Väyrynen became one of the most influential Finnish politicians in 1980 when he was elected as the Chairman of Finnish Centre Party. The Väyrynen victory in 1980 party congress was remarkable also because his main opponent was a well known ex-Prime Minister of Finland Johannes Virolainen. The vote was tight; 1737 delegates of the Party Congress voted for Väyrynen and 1611 delegates supported Virolainen. President Kekkonen's support in the background was of decisive importance in Väyrynen's victory.

The "Jalasmökki scandal" 1982 shadowed Väyrynen's career later in media. It occurred when only a few square metres' mobile cabin was found in the address in Keminmaa where Väyrynen officially resided. Väyrynen lived at the same time in Helsinki and used the cabin to get extra compensation from public funds. Later the system of expense compensations for the members of the Parliament of Finland was made more favourable for MPs from distant electoral districts.

Just a year before 1983 Finnish parliamentary election the Centre Party merged with the Liberals, but this did not help the party prevent the rise of the populist Finnish Rural Party. Nevertheless, the Centre Party formed a government with the Social Democratic Party of Finland and Väyrynen became the Deputy Prime Minister and Minister for Foreign Affairs.

=== Opposition leader 1987-1991 ===
After 1982 Finnish presidential election and the 1983 parliament election, the Social Democrats had secured a hegemony in Finnish politics, holding both the President and Prime Minister chairs. To destroy the hegemony, Väyrynen made a secret agreement with the opposition forces (conservative National Coalition Party, the Christian League and Liberals) and Swedish People's Party of Finland before the 1987 Finnish parliamentary election to form a new Centre-Right government after the elections if the coalition would gain a majority. However, at the same time, the National Coalition party had made a similar agreement with the Social Democrats. Even though the Social Democrats lost a bit of their support in the elections, they remained the biggest party and formed a new government with the National Coalition Party. Väyrynen was now the main opposition figure in Finnish politics.

=== Challenger of President Koivisto ===
In 1988 Finnish presidential election, Väyrynen was an obvious choice to be the presidential candidate of the main opposition party. On the first round, he received 20.6% of the votes and challenged the incumbent President Koivisto. Nevertheless, the National Coalition candidate supported Koivisto, who was elected to his second term.

After the presidential elections, Väyrynen's Centre Party was successful in Finnish municipality elections and gained 21.1% of the votes.

=== Resignation of the party chairmanship and 1991 elections ===
In 1990, Väyrynen decided to resign after being the party chairman for ten years. Esko Aho was elected as a successor of Väyrynen. He led the Centre Party into a historic victory with 24.83% of the votes. Väyrynen received more votes than any other candidate in the country and was chosen–for the fourth time during his political career–as the Minister for Foreign Affairs.

Paavo Väyrynen was critical to the active support given by the Danish Uffe Ellemann-Jensen and the Icelandic Jon Baldvin Hannibalsson to the Baltic states in their fight to regain independence. In 1992, however, Paavo Väyrynen together with nine other Ministers of Foreign Affairs from the Baltic Sea area and an EU commissioner founded the Council of the Baltic Sea States (CBSS) and the EuroFaculty, as Finland actively supported.

Later, former Estonian prime minister Edgar Savisaar criticised that Väyrynen as a minister of Foreign Affairs with the Social Democrat president Mauno Koivisto and conservative party leader Harri Holkeri were more of a hindrance than a help in Estonia's independence process.

=== EU membership disappointment and 1994 election ===
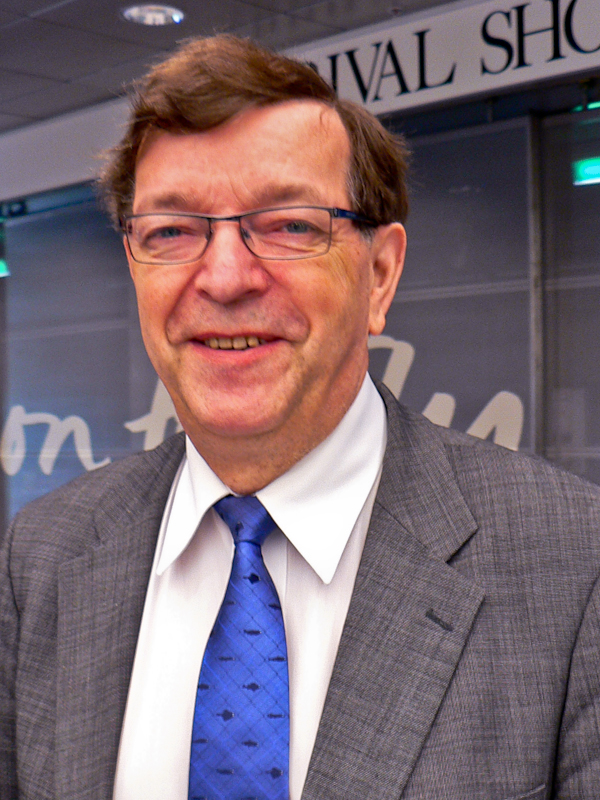
Väyrynen in 2009.

During his ministry, Finland submitted its application for European Union (EU) membership. Nevertheless, the negotiations with the EU were a disappointment to Väyrynen. When the result of the negotiation was ready, Väyrynen declared that he would oppose Finnish EU membership.

With the new chairman of the party supporting EU membership, Väyrynen decided to resign as a Minister. He challenged the new political line of the party by announcing his candidacy to the 1994 presidential election. He beat his main opponents Keijo Korhonen and Eeva Kuuskoski in the Centre Party primary. After Väyrynen's victory, both Kuuskoski and Korhonen decided to run as independent candidates in the elections.

Väyrynen finished third in the election and did not make it to the second round. He was highly disappointed with the result, especially when the results of early voting were announced. The opinion polls released by the media just before the presidential elections' first round had shown low support for Väyrynen, although in reality he was the second most popular candidate in early voting. On the official election day, Väyrynen received much less support and he claimed that the media had manipulated the opinion polls to convince voters to believe that Väyrynen had no chance to advance to the second round. According to Väyrynen, there was a "media game" against him. Later the phrase ("media game", mediapeli in Finnish) became a popular slogan in Finnish politics.

=== Opposition figure inside his own party ===
After the presidential elections, Finland also held a referendum of the EU membership until late 1994. The Centre Party was split in the issue by the party leaders supporting the membership and Väyrynen campaigning fiercely against it. The Party Congress decided to support the membership and Väyrynen became a prominent opposition figure inside his own party.

=== Member of the European Parliament ===
When Finland joined the European Union in 1995, the Finnish Parliament elected Väyrynen to the European Parliament. In the 1996 European Parliament election, Väyrynen was the candidate with the most votes–157,668–in the entirety of Finland. In the European Parliament, Väyrynen worked as the Vice Chairman of the Alliance of Liberals and Democrats for Europe group. As an MEP, Väyrynen defended the European Union based on supranational principles and opposed the ideas of federal Europe.

In the 1999 European Parliament election, Väyrynen was again the vote-puller of his party, but this time with only 60,000 votes. In the 2004 European Parliament election, Väyrynen was elected for the third time in row.

=== Return to Finnish politics ===
During his career in the European Parliament, Väyrynen tried to get a comeback to the Finnish politics several times. His first unsuccessful attempt was in September 1999 when Väyrynen lost the primary election for President against Esko Aho.

His second attempt in 2002 ended in a painful defeat. Väyrynen was a candidate for the Centre Party chairmanship, but received only 100 votes out of a few thousand delegates in the party congress. He had not lost only the support of the party leadership, but also the support of ordinary Centre Party members.

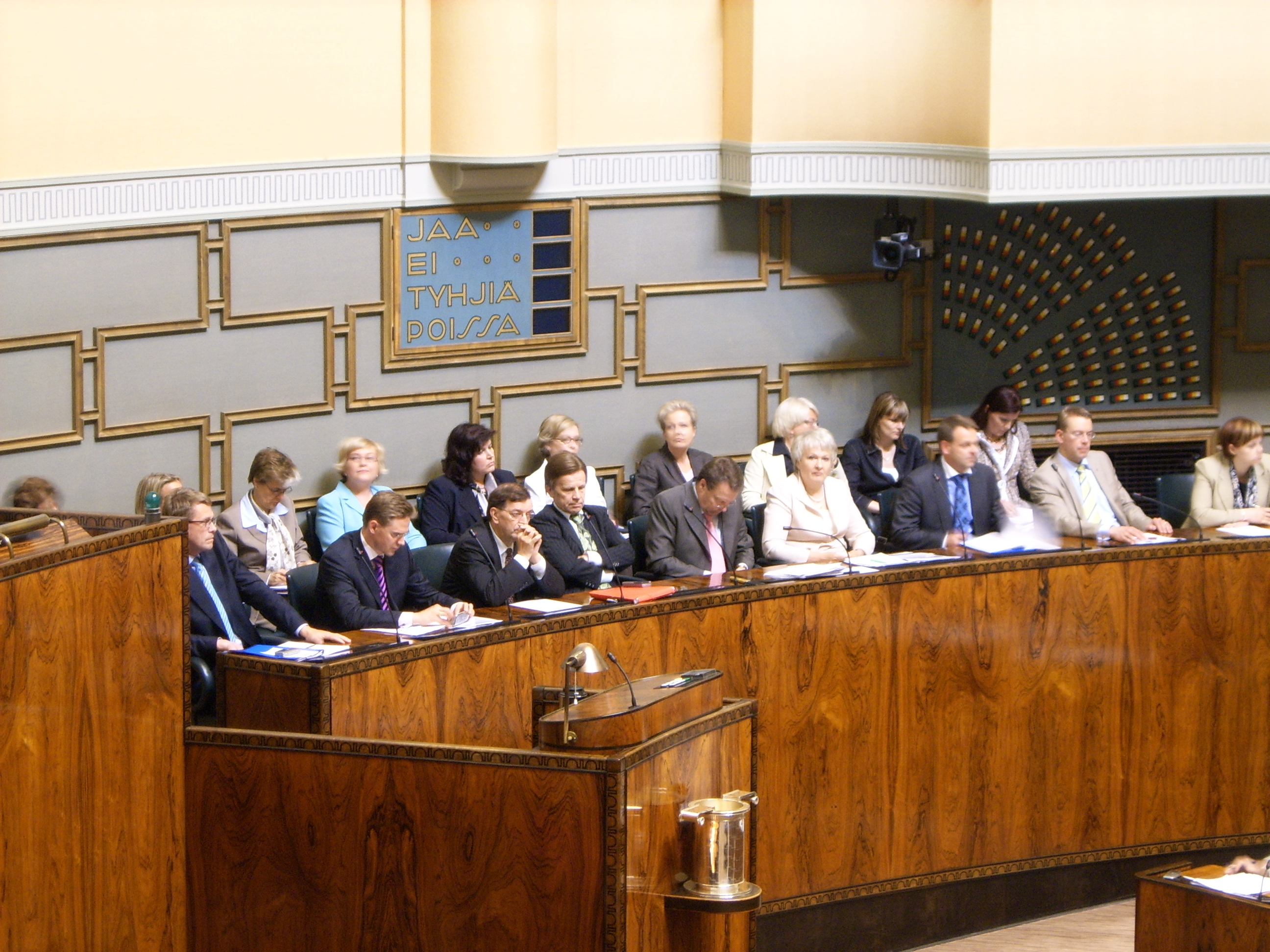
Väyrynen (third from down left) was a Minister of Foreign Trade and Development in Vanhanen II cabinet.

Nevertheless, the ordinary voters had not forgotten Väyrynen. He participated in Finnish parliamentary election in 2003 and promised not to return to the European Parliament. In 2004, Väyrynen, tired of the lack of support by the Finnish political elite, was re-elected to the European Parliament.

In 2007, Väyrynen finally returned to the Finnish Parliament. In the election, he was elected from Lapland to the Parliament, but refused to receive the parliamentary seat without a minister's portfolio. Surprisingly, Matti Vanhanen, the new Prime Minister, offered him a position as the Minister of Foreign Trade and Development. As a minister, Väyrynen found himself often in opposition to other members of the cabinet.

As a minister, he said that Finland should not have joined the eurozone. In 2008, he labeled the Russia–Georgia War as a "Georgian attack" on "Russian peacekeepers" and ended his article with the statement that Finland should not discuss NATO membership because "it could create the impression that Finland is moving from cooperation to confrontation".

In 2010, Väyrynen ran again for the chairmanship of the Centre Party. The veteran politician suffered a heavy loss once again finishing only fourth in the vote. Väyrynen again blamed a "media game" for his loss.

Many Finns believed that Väyrynen's career was over when he lost his seat as a member of Finnish parliament in the 2011 election. Väyrynen had changed from his stronghold electoral district of Lapland to the Uusimaa electoral district. Later, he accused Timo Laaninen, the secretary general of the Centre Party, for luring him to change the electoral district.

=== 2012 presidential election ===
Soon after his loss in the 2011 parliamentary election, Väyrynen announced his willingness to participate in the upcoming 2012 presidential election. Väyrynen appeared to be the only one believing in his chances of winning the primary for the Centre Party. Nevertheless, the party, suffering from a heavy loss in 2011 parliament election, saw no one else interested in to run in the election, and as a result Väyrynen was again a presidential candidate. In the summer of 2011, the European sovereign debt crisis became worse and Väyrynen's predictions from 1990s looked surprisingly real.

Väyrynen had been polling third or second in opinion polls for the election after Sauli Niinistö. He was also accusing other candidates of hiding their positive attitude of possible Finnish membership in NATO. He has also suggested that Finland ought to readopt the Finnish markka alongside the euro. Väyrynen was eliminated from the second round of the election (5 February), placing third on the first round (22 January) behind the Green League's Pekka Haavisto by a close margin of 1.3% (37,000 votes).

=== After presidential election ===
Soon after the presidential election, Väyrynen announced his candidacy for the chairman's position in the party congress in the summer of 2012. He was eliminated from the second round of the election, placing third on the first round behind Juha Sipilä and Tuomo Puumala.

In 2014 European Parliament election Väyrynen was elected again to the European Parliament with 69,360 votes. He also participated the Finnish parliamentary election in 2015, and was elected with 6,889 votes. After the election, Väyrynen announced that he would continue his work in the European Parliament, but would return to the Finnish Parliament, if he is given a cabinet position.

In July 2015, Väyrynen launched a citizens' initiative to organize a referendum on whether Finland should remain in the euro zone. Väyrynen argued that the decision to join euro was a mistake.

=== Founding a new party ===
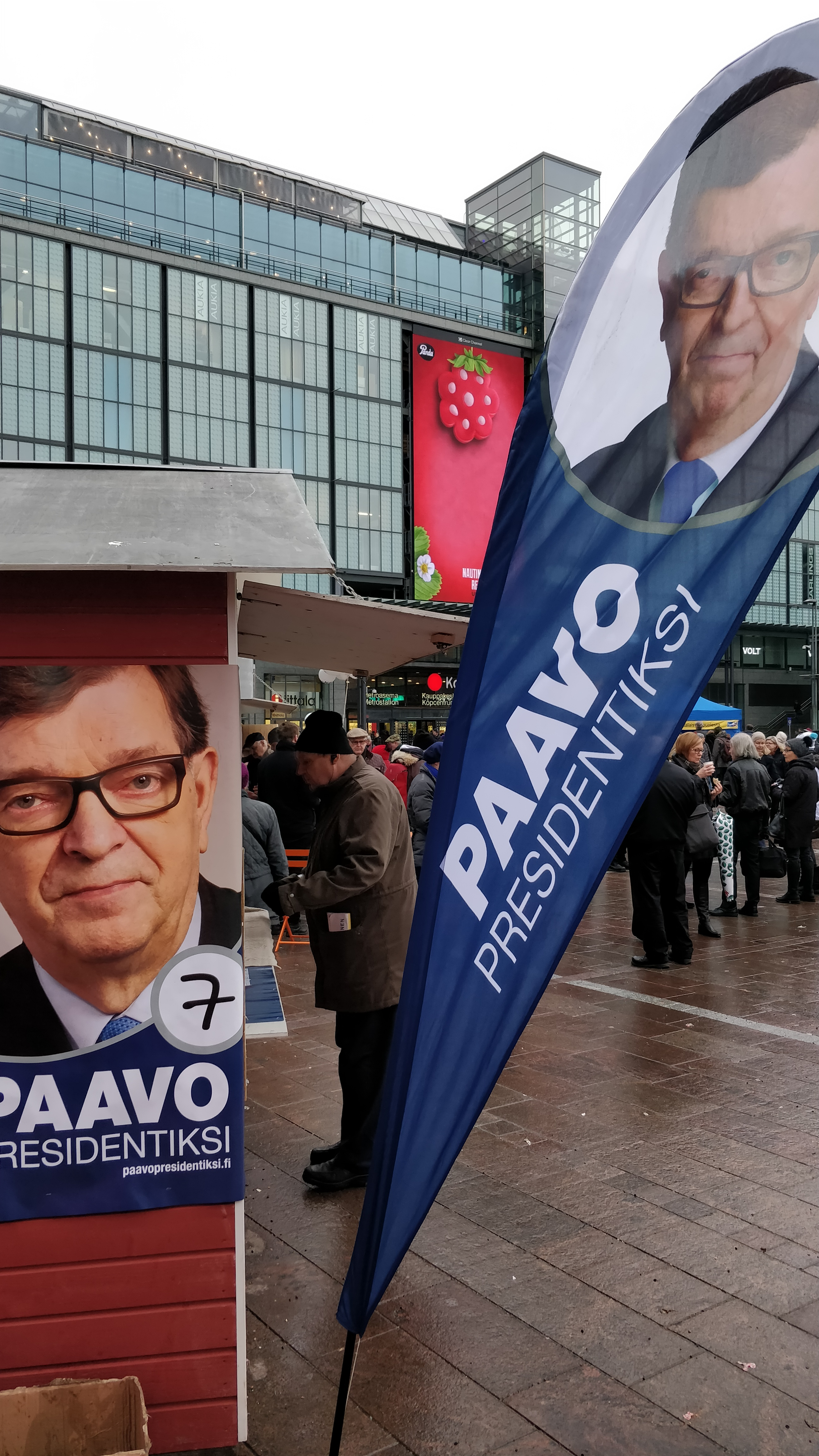
Väyrynen election tent in the 2018 Finnish presidential election

In January 2016, Väyrynen announced that he would leave all board positions in the Centre Party. He stated that he was no longer able to affect the decision making within the party and criticized the Sipilä cabinet for its liberal politics. Soon after, Väyrynen announced that he was founding a new party called the Citizens' Party (Kansalaispuolue) and would represent it for rest of his term in the European Parliament. The party managed to gather enough signatures from supporters and was thus qualified as a registered party in December 2016. In 2017, Keminmaa Centre party's branch announced that Väyrynen was resigned from the party as he had founded new political party

Väyrynen ran for the City Council of Helsinki during the 2017 municipal elections as an independent on the party list of the Christian Democrats. He gained 1,026 votes and was elected.

On 15 July 2017, Väyrynen announced that he planned to run as an independent candidate in the 2018 presidential election if he managed to gather the needed 20,000 signatures from his supporters in time. At the same time, Väyrynen announced that he had left the chairmanship of the Citizens' Party. On 5 December, Väyrynen announced that he had gathered the needed signatures and his candidacy was soon confirmed by the Ministry of Justice.

In the election, Väyrynen placed fourth with 6.2% of the votes, while Niinistö went on to secure his second term with a majority of votes. After the results were announced, Väyrynen commented that he was "extremely glad" for the results and said that he would take the seat in the Finnish Parliament that he had put on hold after the 2015 election during following spring. On 1 February 2018, Väyrynen announced that he would challenge the incumbent chairman of the Centre Party Juha Sipilä in the next party convention in June, and that he would return to Parliament after the convention.

On 3 March 2018, the Citizens' Party expelled Väyrynen from the party, due to his alleged misdeeds with the campaign funding during the presidential elections and determination to seek the chairmanship of the Centre Party. Väyrynen denied the allegations and instead started a court case against the activities of the board of the Citizens' Party. In April 2018, he left the party willingly to concentrate on the chairmanship election of the Centre Party. However, on 25 April 2018, Väyrynen announced that he would step back from the chairmanship election and subsequently left the Centre Party.

On 12 June 2018, Väyrynen left the European Parliament in order to take the MP's seat that he had gained in the 2015 parliamentary elections. He went on to found a new parliamentary group for the Citizens' Party, although his status within the party was still unclear due to the ongoing court case. On 28 June 2018, Väyrynen announced that, due to the disagreements with the Citizens' Party, he had founded a new political movement called Seven Star Movement. Later, Väyrynen formally changed the affiliation of his parliamentary group from Citizens' Party to the Seven Star Movement.

Väyrynen took part in the 2019 parliamentary election as a candidate of the Seven Star Movement, but was not elected. Weeks after the election, Väyrynen announced that he would leave the Seven Star Movement. He still took part in the 2019 European Parliament election as a candidate of the party, but was not elected.

=== Return to the Centre Party ===
In February 2020, Väyrynen rejoined the Centre Party. He has announced his willingness to seek chairman's position, if his nomination gains enough support.

In April 2022, he announced his intention to run for the Centre Party leadership once more, saying that he would run on a platform opposing Finnish accession to NATO.

=== 2024 presidential election ===
In 2023, Paavo Väyrynen sought to run as an independent candidate in the 2024 Finnish presidential election. As required for non-party candidates, he needed to submit a minimum of 20,000 signed supporter cards to the Ministry of Justice by the official deadline in December 2023. Although Väyrynen's campaign collected a significant number of cards, he ultimately failed to reach the required threshold and was not confirmed as a candidate.

Following the failed attempt, Väyrynen and his supporters alleged that some batches of completed supporter cards had gone missing in transit. At least one parcel was confirmed to have been mistakenly routed via Tallinn, Estonia, instead of directly within Finland. Väyrynen claimed this may have been due to deliberate interference, and his campaign filed a criminal report with the National Bureau of Investigation (KRP), suggesting the possibility of mail tampering or a hybrid operation aimed at preventing his candidacy.

However, the case was forwarded to the Helsinki police, who determined that there was no evidence of criminal activity, and no investigation was initiated. Väyrynen maintained that the loss of the supporter cards undermined his campaign and questioned the integrity of the process.

== Outside politics ==
=== Pohjantähti Folk High School and Pohjanranta ===
As an MEP, Väyrynen organised Europe education for young people and adults. Later, these lectures formed a base for a folk high school Pohjantähti in Lapland. Väyrynen bought an old retirement home in Keminmaa with his wife and renovated it into a school. However, the Finnish Ministry of Education did not financially support the project of the ex-Minister of Education.

In the same area, Väyrynen has also opened Pohjanranta farm, which hosts a youth home, a dance hall, a vineyard, a hostel and a church.

=== Books written by Väyrynen ===
- Köyhän asialla (1971)
- On muutoksen aika (1974)
- Kansallisia kysymyksiä (1981)
- Kansakunta. Ihmiskunta (1987)
- Finlands utrikespolitik. Den nationella doktrinen och framtidens mänsklighetspolitik (1988)
- Suomen ulkopolitiikka: Kansallinen doktriini ja tulevaisuuden ihmiskuntapolitiikka (1989)
- Yhteinen tehtävämme. Kansanvaltaisen muutoksen strategia (1989)
- On muutoksen aika 2. Tosiasioita ja haavekuvia Suomesta (1993)
- On totuuden aika 1. Tosiasioita ja muistikuvia Urho Kekkosen Suomesta (1993)
- On totuuden aika 2. Tosiasioita ja muistikuvia Mauno Koiviston Suomesta (1993)
- On muutoksen aika 1. Tosiasioita ja haavekuvia tulevaisuudesta 1974 ja 1994 (1994)
- Suomen puolueettomuus uudessa Euroopassa: Kansallinen doktriini ympäristön murroksessa (1996)
- Paneurooppa ja uusidealismi: Tutkielma Richard Coudenhove-Kalergin filosofisista ja yhteiskunnallisista ajatuksista (1997)
- Itsenäisen Suomen puolesta (1999)
- Etiäisiä vai kaukoviisautta? Paavo Väyrysen puheita ja kirjoituksia 1999–2004 (2004)
- Eemeli Väyrysen vuosisata (2010)
- Huonomminkin olisi voinut käydä. Esseitä elämästä, politiikasta ja yrittämisestä (2011)
- Eihän tässä näin pitänyt käydä (2015)
- Kukahan nämäkin sotkut selvittää? (2016)
- Suomen linja 2017 (2017)
