= Riitta Myller =

Finnish politician

MEP Riitta Myller in 1998.

Riitta Myller (born 12 July 1956 in Joensuu, North Karelia) is a Finnish politician and former Member of the European Parliament (MEP). She is a member of the Social Democratic Party of Finland, which is part of the Party of European Socialists, and sat on the European Parliament's Committee on the Environment, Public Health and Food Safety.

She was also a substitute for the Committee on Regional Development, a member of the delegation for relations with the Gulf States, including Yemen, and a substitute for the delegation to the Euro-Mediterranean Parliamentary Assembly.

Myller was a member from January 1995 to July 2009.

== Career ==
- Master's degree in social sciences
- Freelance journalist, Yleisradio (1983-1987)
- Member, Joensuu Town Council (1980-1995)
- Member of Parliament (1987-1994)
- posts held in the Finnish Parliament
- member, Transport Committee (1987-1990 and 1991-1994)
- member, Grand Committee (1987-1990 and 1993-1994)
- member, Environment Committee (1991-1994)
- Member of the Finnish group in the Inter-Parliamentary Union (IPU) (1990-1994)
- Member of the European Parliament (since 1995)
- Vice-chairwoman of the PSE Group (1997-2004)
- Member, EP Committee on the Environment, Public Health and Consumer Policy (1999-2004) and substitute member (1995-1999)
- substitute member, Committee on Employment and Social Affairs (1999-2004)
- substitute member, Temporary Committee of Inquiry into BSE (1997)
- substitute member, Temporary Committee on Human Genetics (2001-2002)
- member, Temporary Committee on Improving Safety at Sea (2003-2004)
- member, Committee on Regional Policy (1995-1999)
