= 2024 European Parliament election in Finland =

← 2019	9 June 2024	2029 →

All 15 Finnish seats in the European Parliament
- Turnout: 42.4%
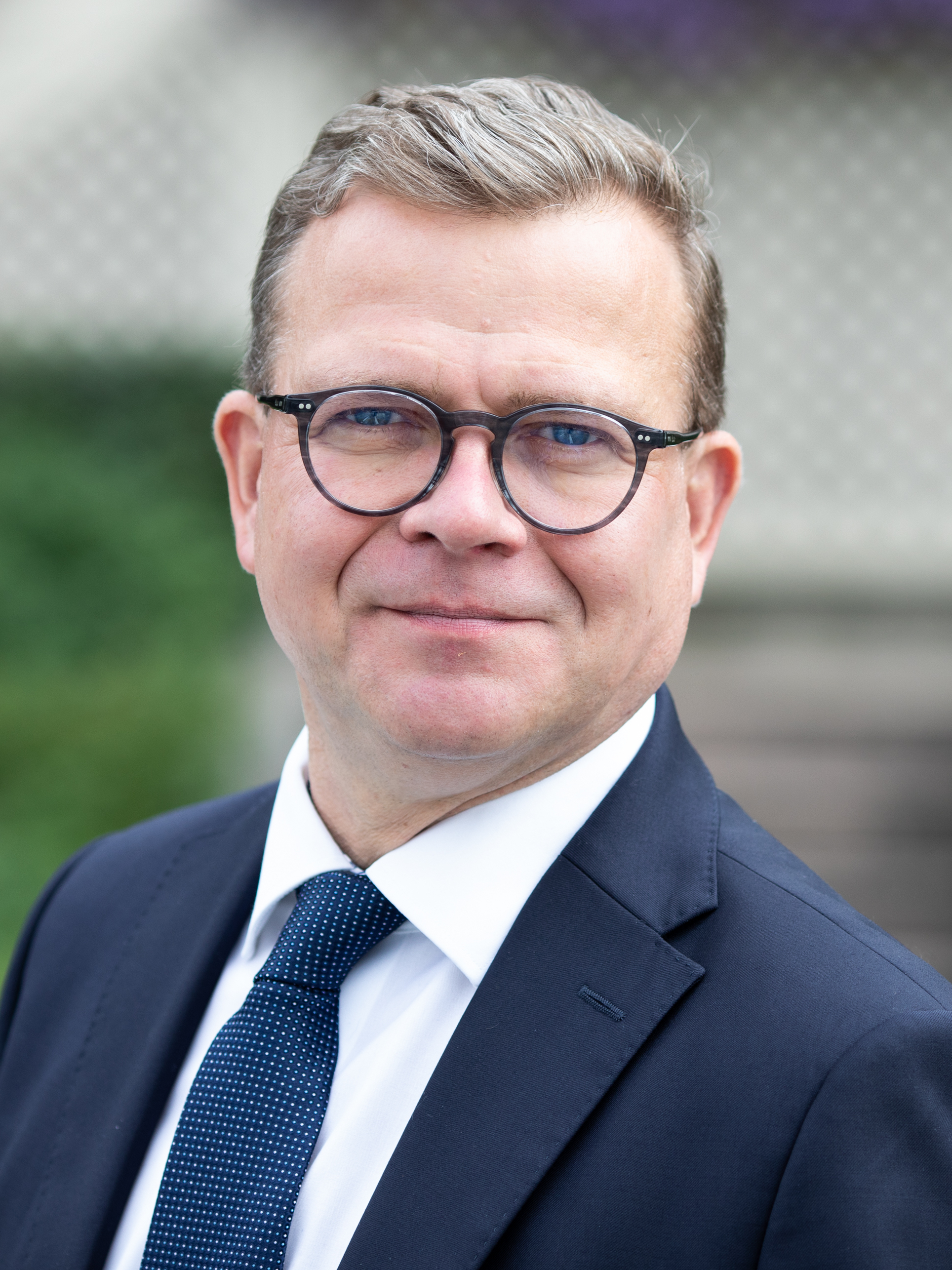

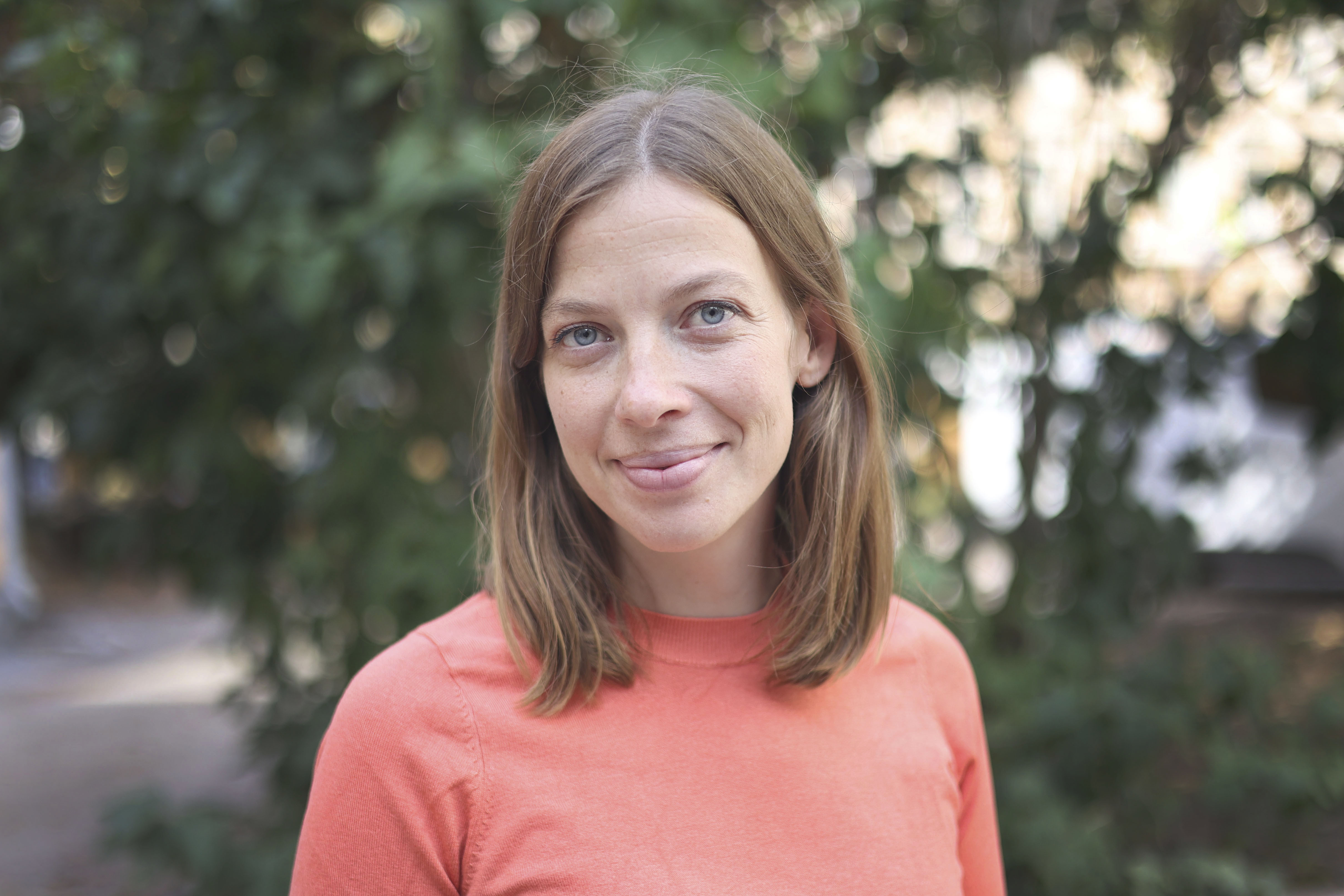

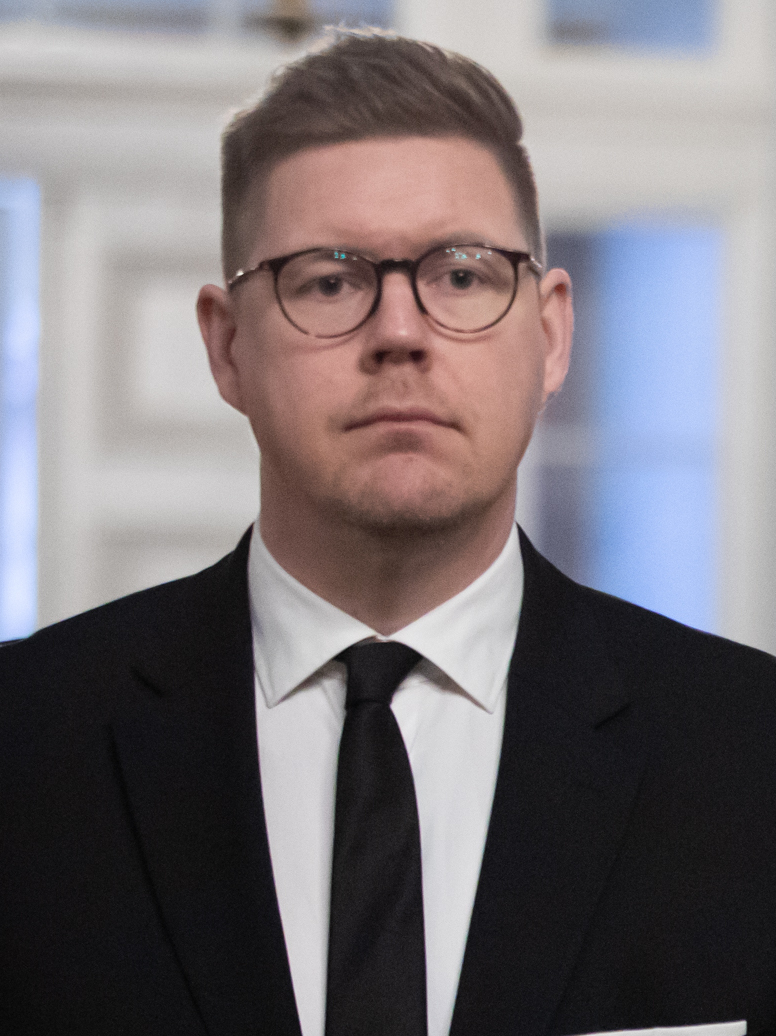

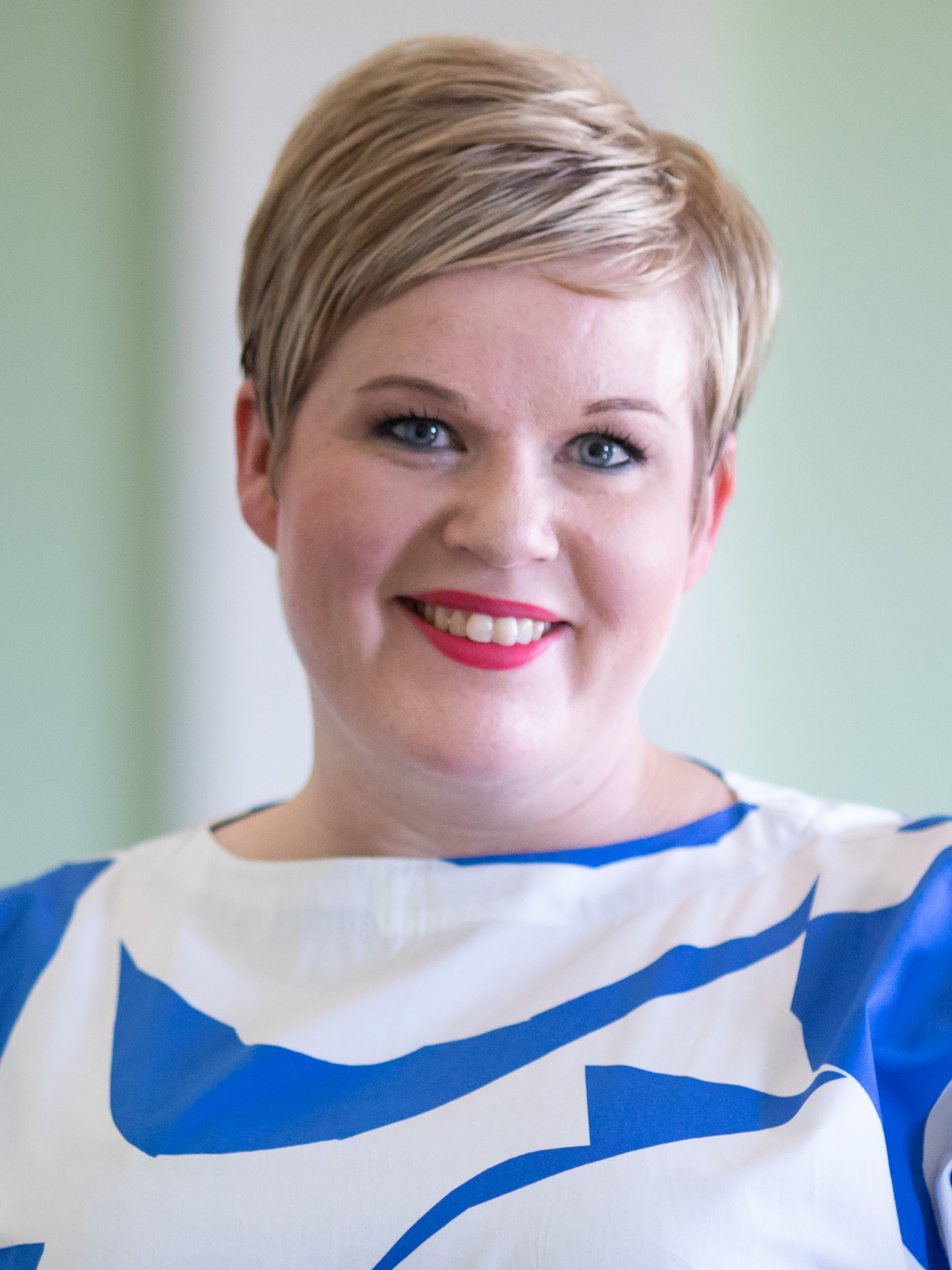

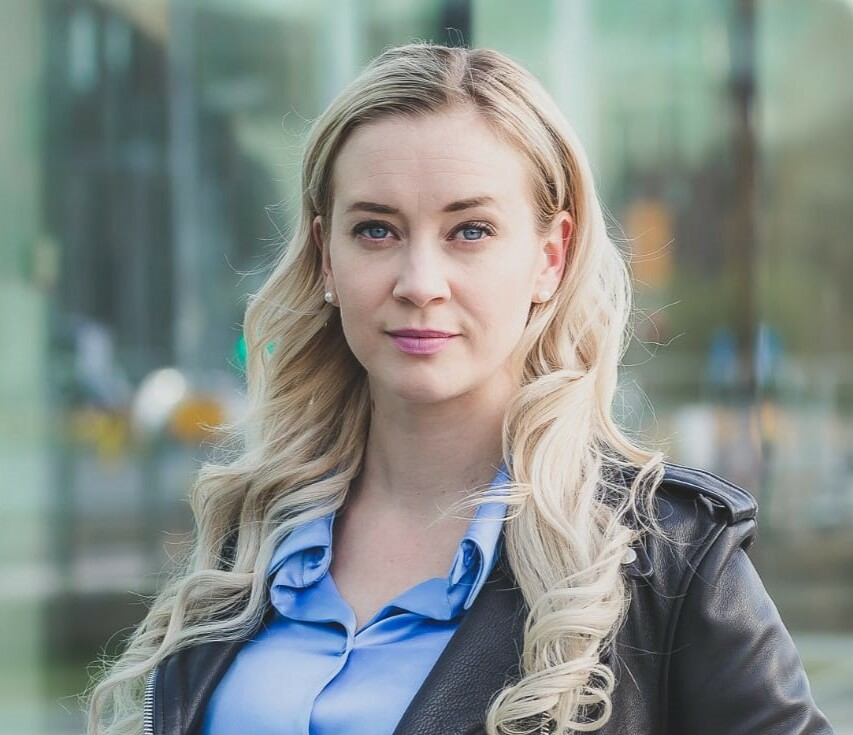

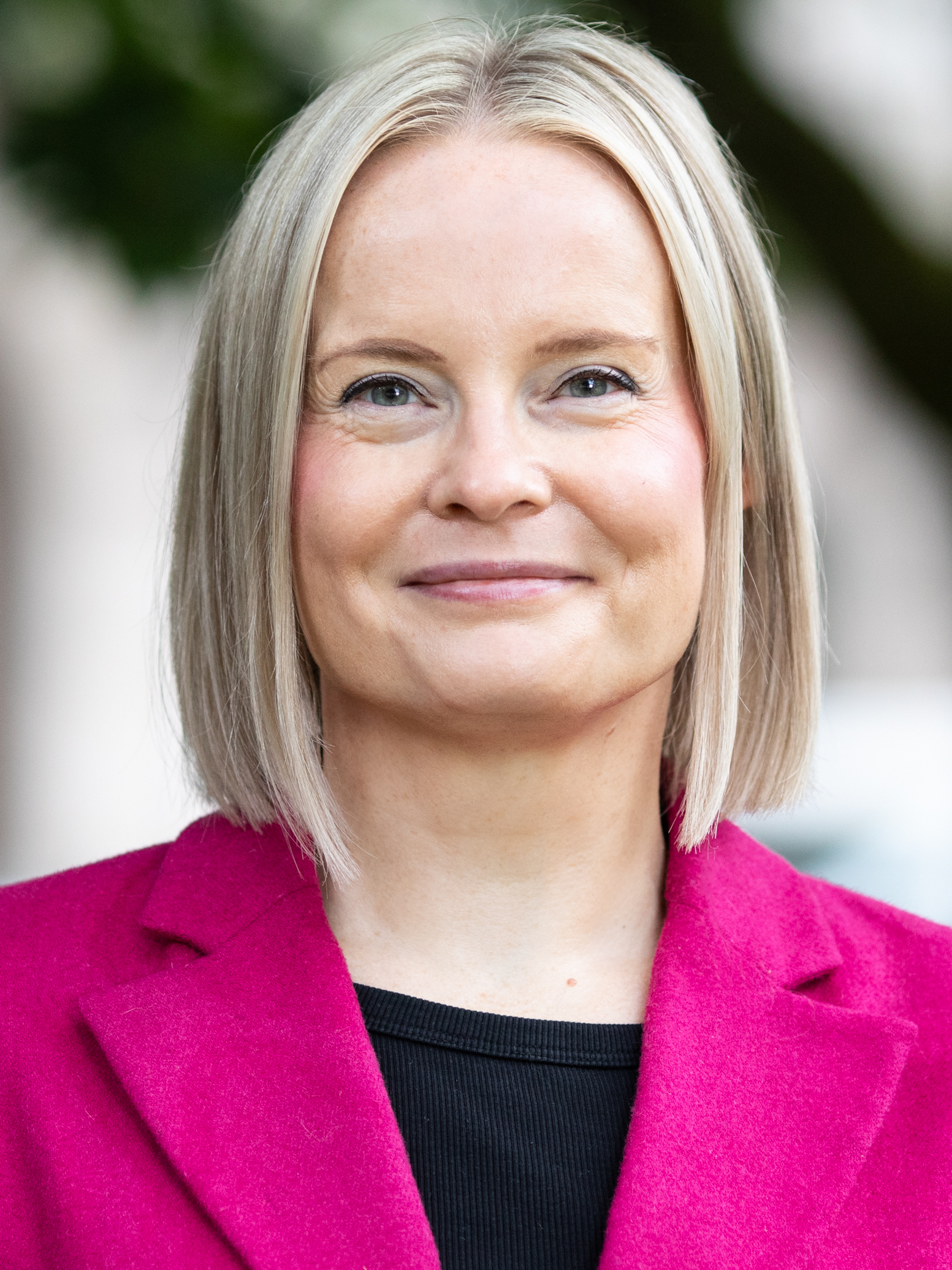

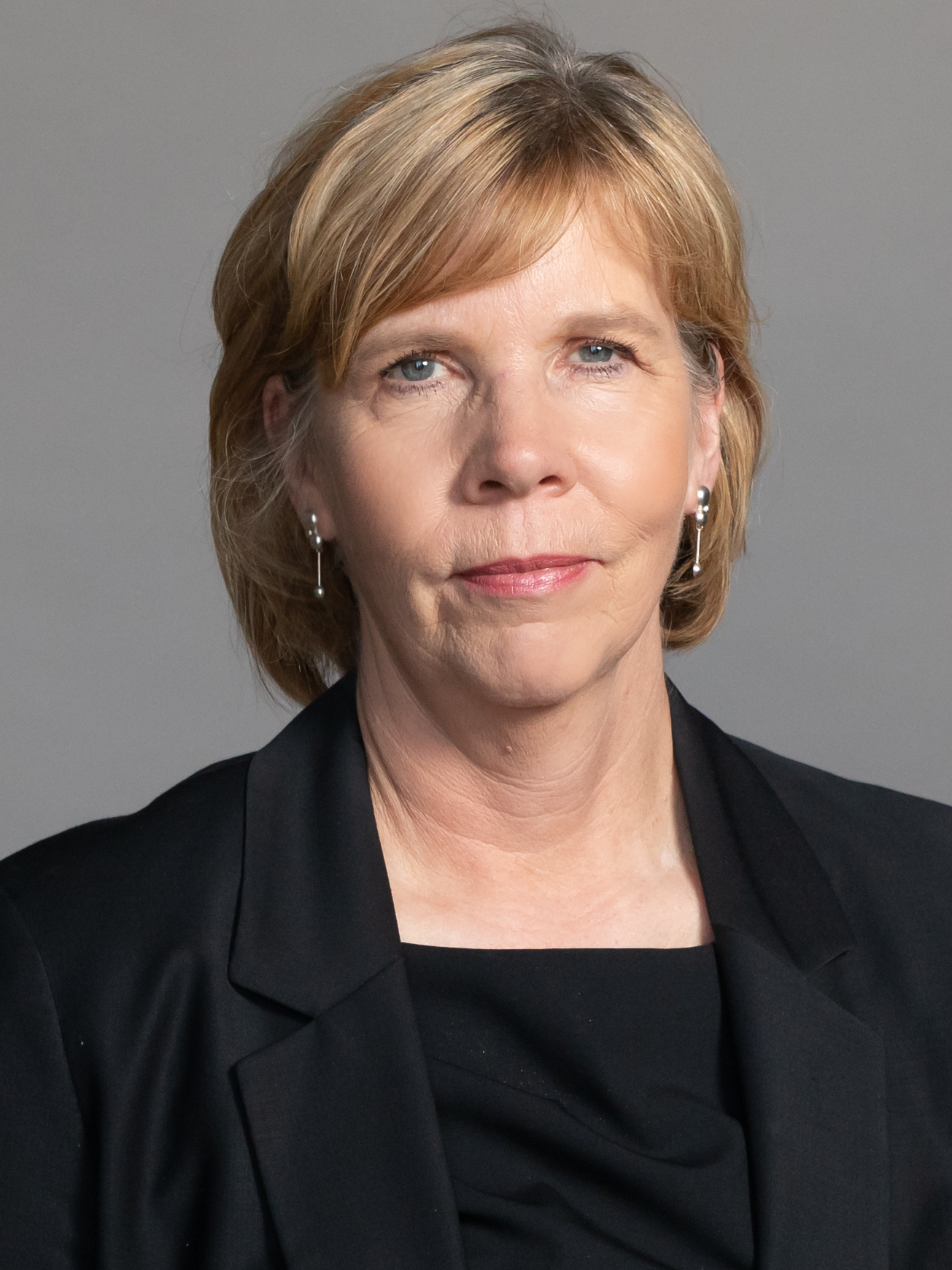
	First party	Second party	Third party
Leader	Petteri Orpo	Li Andersson	Antti Lindtman
Party	National Coalition	Left Alliance	SDP
Alliance	EPP	The Left	S&D
Last election	20.79%, 3 seats	6.89%, 1 seat	14.62%, 2 seats
Seats won	4	3	2
Seat change	▲1	▲2	Steady
Popular vote	453,016	316,758	271,847
Percentage	24.77%	17.32%	14.86%
Swing	▲3.98pp	▲10.43pp	▲0.24pp
	Fourth party	Fifth party	Sixth party
Leader	Annika Saarikko	Sofia Virta	Riikka Purra
Party	Centre	Green	Finns
Alliance	RE	Greens/EFA	ECR
Last election	13.52%, 2 seats	16.00%, 3 seat	13.83%, 2 seats
Seats won	2	2	1
Seat change	Steady	▼1	▼1
Popular vote	215,064	206,178	139,019
Percentage	11.76%	11.27%	7.60%
Swing	▼1.76pp	▼4.73pp	▼6.23pp
	Seventh party
Leader	Anna-Maja Henriksson
Party	RKP
Alliance	RE
Last election	6.34%, 1 seat
Seats won	1
Seat change	Steady
Popular vote	112,761
Percentage	6.17%
Swing	▼0.17pp

An election of the delegation from Finland to the European Parliament took place on 9 June 2024 as part of the 2024 European Parliament election. This was the seventh European Parliament election held in Finland, and the first to take place after Brexit. Finnish voters elected fifteen members from seven national parties to the European Parliament. The elected joined the European groups followingly: EPP 4, RE 3, The Left 3, Greens/EFA 2, S&D 2, ECR 1.

== Electoral system ==
=== Apportionment ===
Compared to last election, Finland is entitled to two more MEPs: one already assigned in 2020 in the occasion of the redistribution post Brexit, and one assigned in 2023 after a pre-election assessment of the Parliament composition based on the most recent population figures.

=== Electoral law ===
The 15 members are elected through open list proportional representation in a single nationwide constituency, with seats allocated through D'Hondt method and no electoral threshold.

Both Finnish citizens and other non-Finnish EU citizens residing in the country are entitled to vote in the European elections in Finland. No registration is needed for Finnish citizens, while other EU citizens residing in Finland are required to register with the Digital and Population Data Services Agency by 21 March 2024 at the latest. Finnish citizens residing abroad can also vote without any prior registration and can choose to vote by post or in the Finnish embassy of their country of residence. In addition, those eligible to vote must turn 18 years old by election day at the latest.

== Voting advice applications ==
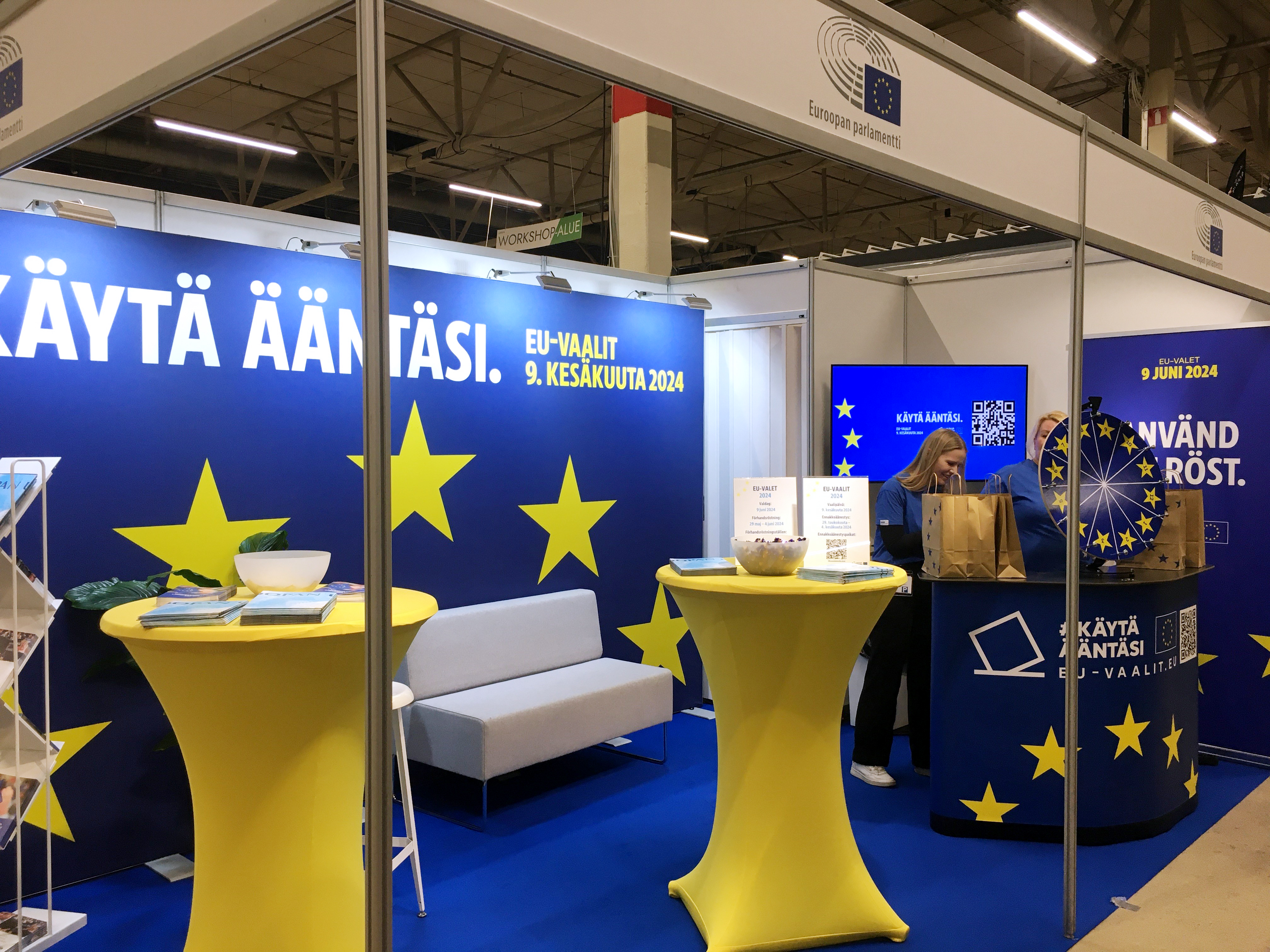
Banners for the 2024 European elections campaign in Helsinki

In Finland, Yle's European election compass allows users to find the candidates who best matches their convictions through 24 different statements across a range of issues: Values, Security, Trade, People and the EU, Economics and subsidies, The future, and Environment. It is available in Finnish, Swedish, English, Sámi, Russian, and Arabic. Each election candidate had been able to state how closely they agree or disagree with each statement and offer a rationale for their decision. Candidates also had the chance to upload a video message, offer three election promises, give brief biographical information and place themselves on a chart with left-right and liberal-conservative axes.

== Outgoing delegation ==
The table shows the detailed composition of the Finnish seats at the European Parliament at the end of the legislature.

EP Group	Seats	Party	Seats	MEPs
European People's Party	3 / 14	National Coalition Party	3	Sirpa Pietikäinen; Petri Sarvamaa; Henna Virkkunen
Renew Europe	3 / 14	Centre Party	2	Elsi Katainen; Mauri Pekkarinen
Renew Europe	3 / 14	Swedish People's Party	1	Nils Torvalds
Greens–European Free Alliance	3 / 14	Green League	3	Alviina Alametsä; Heidi Hautala; Ville Niinistö
Progressive Alliance of Socialists and Democrats	2 / 14	Social Democratic Party	2	Eero Heinäluoma; Miapetra Kumpula-Natri
European Conservatives and Reformists	2 / 14	Finns Party	2	Teuvo Hakkarainen; Pirkko Ruohonen-Lerner
The Left in the European Parliament – GUE/NGL	1 / 14	Left Alliance	1	Silvia Modig
Total			14	
Source: European Parliament

=== MEPs not standing for re-election ===
Name	Party	Date announced	Source
Heidi Hautala	Green League	9 January 2024	
Silvia Modig	Left Alliance	6 February 2024	
Alviina Alametsä	Green League	16 February 2024	
Petri Sarvamaa	National Coalition Party		
Miapetra Kumpula-Natri	Social Democratic Party		
Mauri Pekkarinen	Centre Party		
Nils Torvalds	Swedish People's Party		

== Opinion polls ==
Polling firm	Fieldwork date	Sample size	KOK EPP	VIHR G/EFA	SDP S&D	PS ECR	KESK Renew	VAS Left	SFP Renew	KD EPP	LIIK NI	Others	Lead
Taloustutkimus	29 May–4 June 2024	2,111	20.6; 4	9.3; 1	19.4; 3	16.4; 3	11.9; 2	10.8; 2	4.2; 0	4; 0	1.1; 0	2.2; 0	1.2
Taloustutkimus	23–29 Apr 2024	2,118	21.7; 4	10.5; 2	19.7; 3	14.1; 2	13.6; 2	10.5; 2	4.0; 0	2.9; 0	1.0; 0	2.1; 0	2.0
Verian	18–25 Mar 2024	1,372	22; 4	11; 2	17; 3	14; 2	12; 2	9; 1	5; 0	6; 1		4; 0	5
Ipsos	23 Feb–5 Mar 2024	1,000	22.5; 4	9.0; 1	20.0; 4	19.0; 3	10.5; 2	8.5; 1	3.5; 0	3.5; 0	3.5; 0		2.5
2023 parliamentary election			20.8	7.0	19.9	20.1	11.3	7.1	4.3	4.2	2.4	2.9	0.7
2019 EP election			20.8; 3	16.0; 3	14.6; 2	13.8; 2	13.5; 2	6.9; 1	6.3; 1	4.9; 0	3.1; 0		4.8

== Results ==
Party	Votes	%	Seats	+/–
National Coalition Party	453,636	24.80	4	+1
Left Alliance	316,859	17.32	3	+2
Social Democratic Party of Finland	272,034	14.87	2	0
Centre Party	215,165	11.76	2	0
Green League	206,332	11.28	2	–1
Finns Party	139,160	7.61	1	–1
Swedish People's Party of Finland	112,245	6.14	1	0
Christian Democrats	75,426	4.12	0	0
Freedom Alliance	16,717	0.91	0	New
Movement Now	9,641	0.53	0	New
Liberal Party – Freedom to Choose	7,139	0.39	0	0
Communist Party of Finland	2,815	0.15	0	0
The Open Party	1,273	0.07	0	New
Truth Party	807	0.04	0	New
Total	1,829,249	100.00	15	+1
Valid votes	1,829,249	99.65		
Invalid/blank votes	6,513	0.35		
Total votes	1,835,762	100.00		
Registered voters/turnout	4,546,589	40.38		
Source: Ministry of Justice - Information and Result Service

=== European groups ===
Party	Seats	+/–
European People's Party Group	4	+1
Renew Europe	3	0
The Left in the European Parliament – GUE/NGL	3	+2
Greens–European Free Alliance	2	-1
Progressive Alliance of Socialists and Democrats	2	0
European Conservatives and Reformists Group	1	-1
Total	15	+1
