= 2014 European Parliament election in Finland =

- 25 May 2014

All 13 Finnish seats in the European Parliament
- Turnout: 39.14%
	First party	Second party	Third party
Party	National Coalition	Centre	Finns
Alliance	EPP	ALDE	MELD
Last election	23.21%, 3 seats	19.03%, 3 seats	9.79%, 1 seat
Seats won	3	3	2
Seat change	Steady	Steady	▲1
Popular vote	390,376	339,895	222,457
Percentage	22.59%	19.67%	12.87%
Swing	▼0.62pp	▲0.64pp	▲3.08pp
	Fourth party	Fifth party	Sixth party
Party	SDP	Green	Left Alliance
Alliance	PES	EGP	NGLA/PEL
Last election	17.54%, 2 seats	12.40%, 2 seats	5.93%, 0 seats
Seats won	2	1	1
Seat change	Steady	▼1	▲1
Popular vote	212,781	161,263	161,074
Percentage	12.31%	9.32%	9.32%
Swing	▼5.23pp	▼3.08pp	▲3.39pp
	Seventh party	Eighth party
Party	RKP	KD
Alliance	ALDE	EPP
Last election	6.09%, 1 seat	4.17%, 1 seat
Seats won	1	0
Seat change	Steady	▼1
Popular vote	116,747	90,586
Percentage	6.76%	5.24%
Swing	▲0.67pp	▲1.07pp

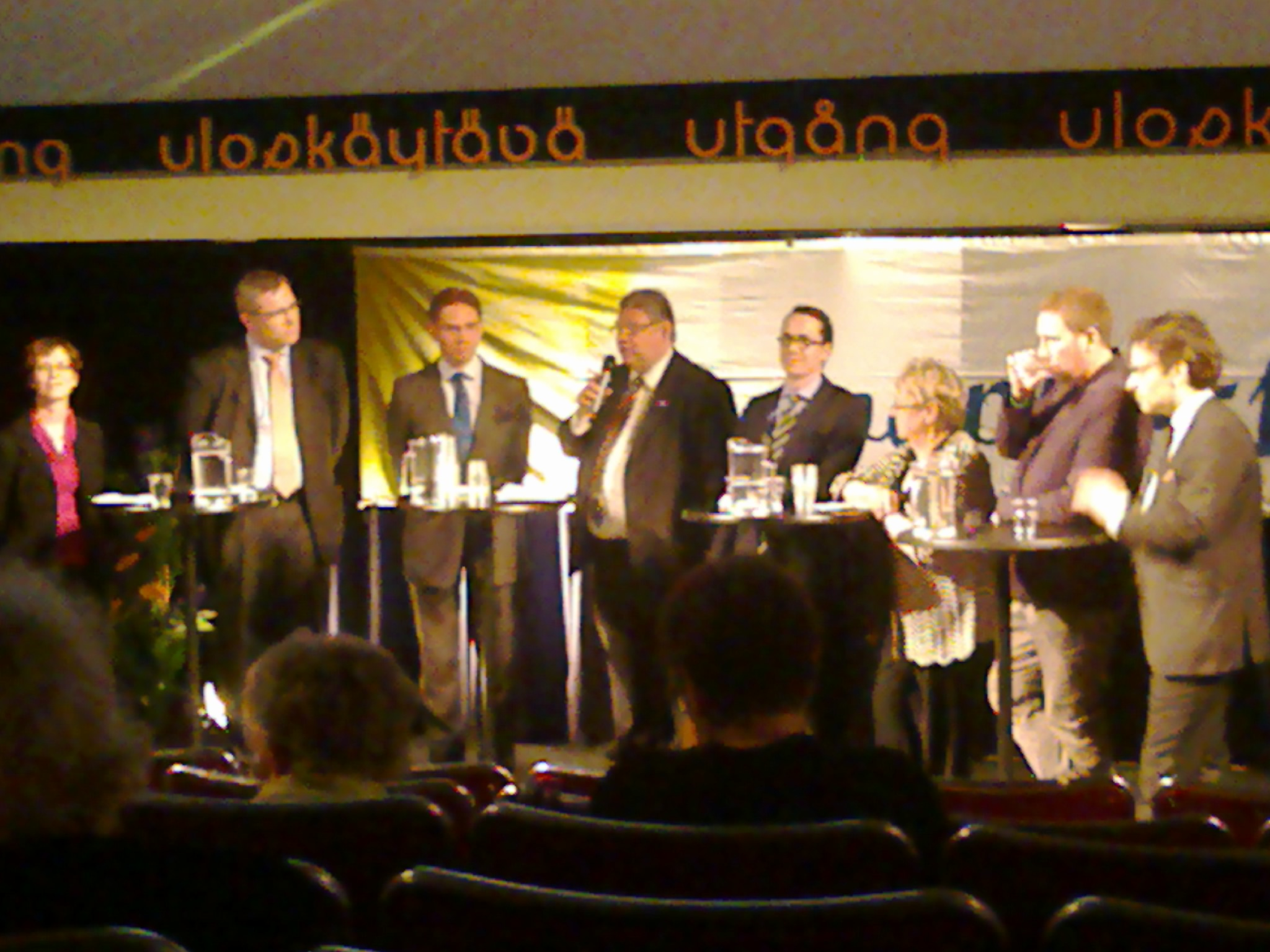
Hustings panel with Finnish political party chairpersons and top candidates on Europe Day 2014. Left to right: Sari Essayah, Mikael Pentikäinen, Jyrki Katainen, Timo Soini, Carl Haglund, Liisa Jaakonsaari, Paavo Arhinmäki, Ville Niinistö.

An election for the election of the delegation from Finland to the European Parliament took place on 25 May 2014 with advance voting from 14 to 20 May. Finnish voters elected thirteen members to the European Parliament.

== Opinion polls ==
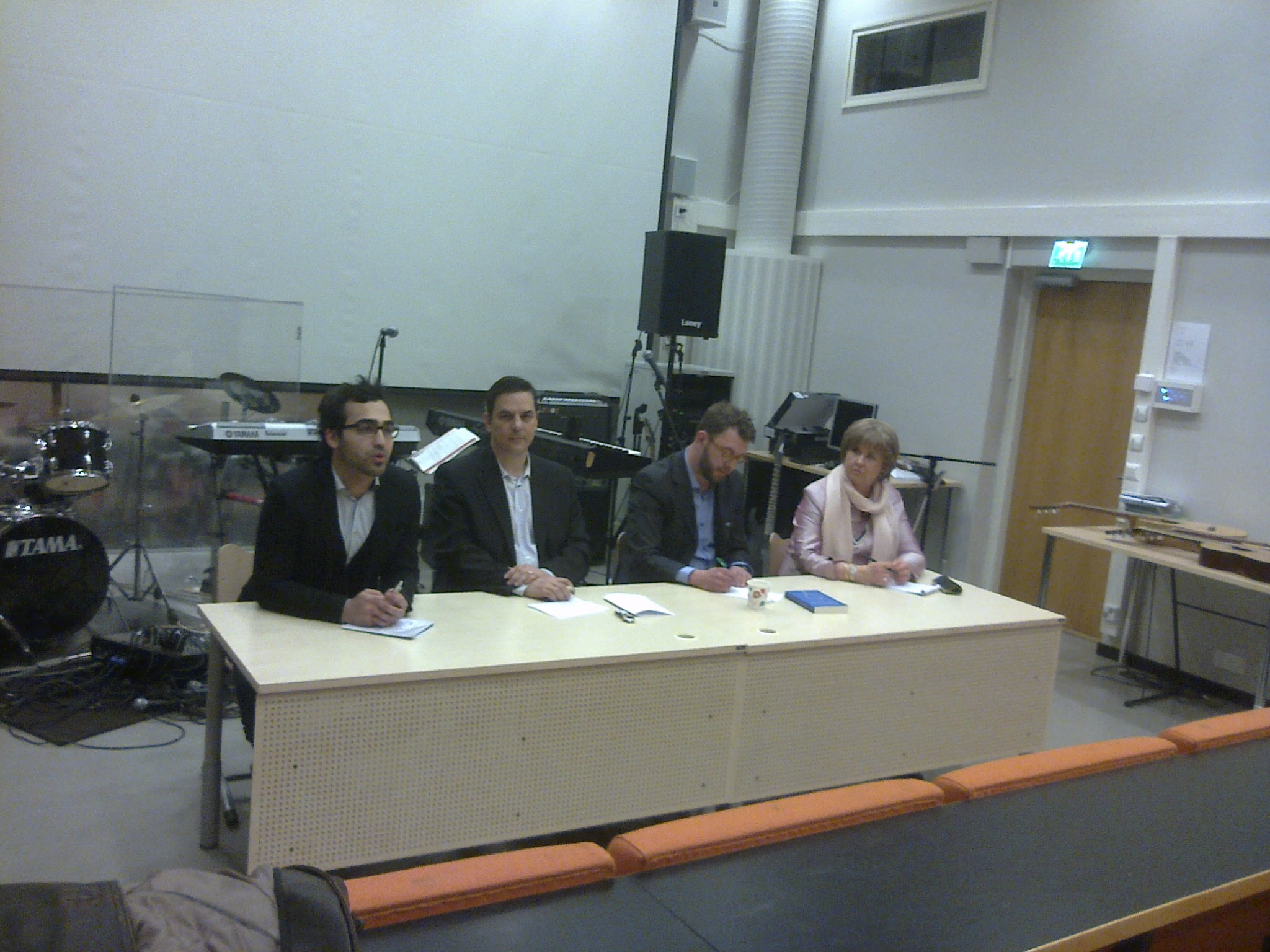
Hustings panel for the European Parliament election in Haaga primary school, Helsinki, Finland, 15 April 2014. From left to right: Ozan Yanar (Greens), Jukka Mattila (panel moderator), Timo Harakka (Social Democratic Party), Marjatta Rasi (National Coalition Party).

Date	Polling Firm	NCP	CEN	SDP	GREEN	FP	SPP	LEFT	CD	Others
22 May 2014	Taloustutkimus	22.7%	17.6%	13.8%	10.0%	17.1%	4.3%	8.4%	4.4%	1.7%
17 May 2014	Tietoykkönen	23.7%	18.9%	15.2%	8.1%	16.0%	4.1%	7.7%	4.4%	1.9%
20 March 2014	Taloustutkimus	23.8%	18.1%	16.3%	9.7%	17.8%	3.6%	6.5%	2.6%	1.6%
17 January 2014	Tietoykkönen	21.1%	20.8%	17.5%	8.9%	15.9%	4.1%	7.2%	3.3%	1.2%
19 November 2013	Taloustutkimus	22.7%	21.7%	15.4%	8.1%	17.0%	3.5%	7.1%	3.6%	0.9%
7 June 2009	2009 elections	23.21%	19.03%	17.54%	12.40%	9.79%	6.09%	5.93%	4.17%	1.84%

== Results ==
Party	Votes	%	Seats	+/–
National Coalition Party	390,376	22.59	3	0
Centre Party	339,895	19.67	3	0
Finns Party	222,457	12.87	2	+1
Social Democratic Party	212,781	12.31	2	0
Green League	161,263	9.33	1	–1
Left Alliance	161,074	9.32	1	+1
Swedish People's Party	116,747	6.76	1	0
Christian Democrats	90,586	5.24	0	–1
Pirate Party	12,378	0.72	0	New
Communist Party	5,932	0.34	0	0
Independence Party	5,668	0.33	0	0
Change 2011	4,768	0.28	0	New
For the Poor	2,667	0.15	0	0
Blue and White Front	1,176	0.07	0	New
Independents	526	0.03	0	0
Total	1,728,294	100.00	13	0
Valid votes	1,728,294	99.44		
Invalid/blank votes	9,743	0.56		
Total votes	1,738,037	100.00		
Registered voters/turnout	4,440,297	39.14		
Source: Ministry of Justice

=== MEPs elected ===
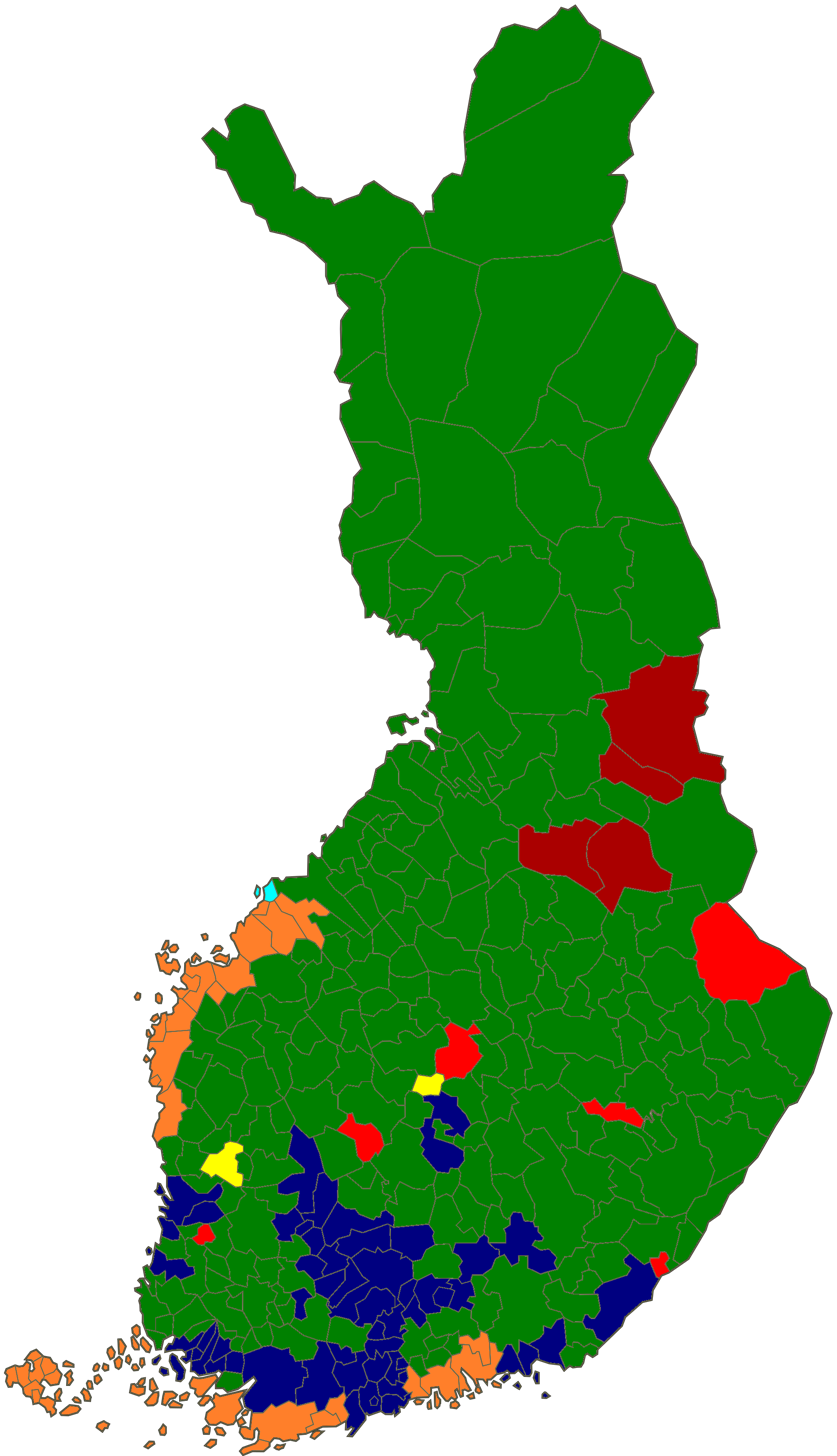
Largest party by municipality: National Coalition Party Centre Party Finns Party Social Democratic Party Left Alliance Swedish People's Party Christian Democrats

National Coalition Party
1. Alexander Stubb* – 148,190 votes
2. Sirpa Pietikäinen – 49,842 votes
3. Henna Virkkunen – 43,829 votes

Centre Party
1. Olli Rehn – 70,398 votes
2. Paavo Väyrynen – 69,360 votes
3. Anneli Jäätteenmäki – 59,538 votes

Finns Party
1. Jussi Halla-aho – 80,772 votes
2. Sampo Terho – 33,833 votes

Social Democratic Party
1. Liisa Jaakonsaari – 44,061 votes
2. Miapetra Kumpula-Natri – 40,734 votes

Green League
1. Heidi Hautala – 31,725 votes

Left Alliance
1. Merja Kyllönen – 58,611 votes

Swedish People's Party
1. Nils Torvalds – 29,355 votes

* Note: Alexander Stubb was chosen to be National Coalition Party chairman in June, and was subsequently appointed Prime Minister. Stubb did not take his seat in the European Parliament. The seat went to Petri Sarvamaa, who had the fourth most votes (37,862) on the NCP list.

=== Most voted-for candidates ===
Candidate	Party	Votes	Change	Municipality
Alexander Stubb	National Coalition Party	148,190		Espoo
Jussi Halla-aho	True Finns	80,772		Helsinki
Olli Rehn	Centre Party	70,398		Helsinki
Paavo Väyrynen	Centre Party	69,360		Keminmaa
Sari Essayah	Christian Democrats	61,264	+7,461	Lapinlahti
Anneli Jäätteenmäki	Centre Party	59,538	−20,618	Helsinki
Merja Kyllönen	Left Alliance	58,611		Suomussalmi
Sirpa Pietikäinen	National Coalition Party	49,842	−1,651	Hämeenlinna
Li Andersson	Left Alliance	47,599		Turku
Liisa Jaakonsaari	Social Democratic Party	44,061	−1,264	Oulu
Henna Virkkunen	National Coalition Party	43,829		Jyväskylä
Miapetra Kumpula-Natri	Social Democratic Party	40,734		Vaasa
Hannu Takkula	Centre Party	39,809	+365	Oulu
Petri Sarvamaa	National Coalition Party	37,862	+10,471	Helsinki
Sampo Terho	True Finns	33,833	+24,459	Helsinki
Heidi Hautala	Green League	31,725	−27,201	Helsinki
Nils Torvalds	Swedish People's Party	29,355	+15,311	Helsinki
Eija-Riitta Korhola	National Coalition Party	27,453	−24,055	Helsinki
Oras Tynkkynen	Green League	24,805		Tampere
Timo Harakka	Social Democratic Party	22,839		Helsinki
Pirkko Ruohonen-Lerner	True Finns	20,942		Porvoo
