= List of members of the Parliament of Finland, 2023–2027 =

This is a list of members of the 39th Parliament of Finland elected at the parliamentary election held on 2 April 2023, and subsequent changes during the 2023–2027 legislative term.

== Members ==
Name	Electoral district	Votes	Party	Group	Took office	Left office	Notes
Pauli Aalto-Setälä	Varsinais-Suomi	7,241	National Coalition Party	National Coalition Party	5 April 2023		
Anders Adlercreutz	Uusimaa	9,442	Swedish People's Party	Swedish	5 April 2023		
Pekka Aittakumpu	Oulu	7,240	Centre Party	Centre Party	5 April 2023	19 October 2024	Switched to the Finns from the Centre Party.
Pekka Aittakumpu	Oulu	7,240	Finns Party	None	20 October 2024	23 October 2024	
Pekka Aittakumpu	Oulu	7,240	Finns Party	Finns Party	24 October 2024		
Alviina Alametsä	Helsinki	5,151	Green League	Greens	16 July 2024		Replaced Maria Ohisalo.
Li Andersson	Varsinais-Suomi	18,007	Left Alliance	Left Alliance	5 April 2023	16 July 2024	Elected to the European Parliament, replaced by Johannes Yrttiaho.
Otto Andersson	Uusimaa	4,936	Swedish People's Party	Swedish	5 April 2023		
Sanna Antikainen	Savo-Karelia	7,720	Finns Party	Finns Party	5 April 2023		
Marko Asell	Pirkanmaa	4,540	Social Democratic Party	Social Democrats	5 April 2023		
Heikki Autto	Lapland	7,185	National Coalition Party	National Coalition Party	5 April 2023		
Kim Berg	Vaasa	3,631	Social Democratic Party	Social Democrats	5 April 2023		
Miko Bergbom	Pirkanmaa	10,525	Finns Party	Finns Party	5 April 2023		
Sandra Bergqvist	Varsinais-Suomi	6,771	Swedish People's Party	Swedish	5 April 2023		
Eva Biaudet	Helsinki	5,195	Swedish People's Party	Swedish	5 April 2023		
Maaret Castrén	Helsinki	3,699	National Coalition Party	National Coalition Party	16 July 2024		Replaced Aura Salla.
Fatim Diarra	Helsinki	6,774	Green League	Greens	5 April 2023		
Juho Eerola	Southeast Finland	5,849	Finns Party	Finns Party	5 April 2023		
Markku Eestilä	Savo-Karelia	3,463	National Coalition Party	National Coalition Party	5 April 2023		
Tiina Elo	Uusimaa	3,886	Green League	Greens	5 April 2023		
Kike Elomaa	Varsinais-Suomi	6,805	Finns Party	Finns Party	5 April 2023		
Eeva-Johanna Eloranta	Varsinais-Suomi	8,496	Social Democratic Party	Social Democrats	5 April 2023		
Seppo Eskelinen	Savo-Karelia	6,975	Social Democratic Party	Social Democrats	5 April 2023		
Sari Essayah	Savo-Karelia	15,862	Christian Democrats	Christian Democrats	5 April 2023		
Noora Fagerström	Uusimaa	6,545	National Coalition Party	National Coalition Party	5 April 2023		
Tarja Filatov	Häme	6,973	Social Democratic Party	Social Democrats	5 April 2023		
Bella Forsgrén	Central Finland	5,787	Green League	Greens	5 April 2023		
Timo Furuholm	Varsinais-Suomi	3,997	Left Alliance	Left Alliance	5 April 2023		
Kaisa Garedew	Central Finland	5,118	Finns Party	Finns Party	5 April 2023		
Elisa Gebhard	Helsinki	5,872	Social Democratic Party	Social Democrats	5 April 2023		
Sanni Grahn-Laasonen	Häme	7,003	National Coalition Party	National Coalition Party	5 April 2023		
Maria Guzenina	Uusimaa	12,088	Social Democratic Party	Social Democrats	5 April 2023	16 July 2024	Elected to the European Parliament, replaced by Helena Marttila.
Tuula Haatainen	Helsinki	9,667	Social Democratic Party	Social Democrats	5 April 2023		
Pekka Haavisto	Helsinki	8,036	Green League	Greens	5 April 2023		
Antti Häkkänen	Southeast Finland	21,378	National Coalition Party	National Coalition Party	5 April 2023		
Jussi Halla-aho	Helsinki	22,081	Finns Party	Finns Party	5 April 2023		
Lotta Hamari	Pirkanmaa	2,675	Social Democratic Party	Social Democrats	14 September 2023		Replaced Sanna Marin.
Juha Hänninen	Oulu	5,251	National Coalition Party	National Coalition Party	5 April 2023		
Timo Harakka	Helsinki	7,154	Social Democratic Party	Social Democrats	5 April 2023		
Atte Harjanne	Helsinki	5,804	Green League	Greens	5 April 2023		
Hjallis Harkimo	Uusimaa	8,607	Movement Now	Liike Nyt	5 April 2023		
Janne Heikkinen	Oulu	6,452	National Coalition Party	National Coalition Party	5 April 2023		
Eveliina Heinäluoma	Helsinki	15,837	Social Democratic Party	Social Democrats	5 April 2023		
Timo Heinonen	Häme	7,402	National Coalition Party	National Coalition Party	5 April 2023		
Anna-Maja Henriksson	Vaasa	12,657	Swedish People's Party	Swedish	5 April 2023	16 July 2024	Elected to the European Parliament, replaced by Christoffer Ingo.
Pia Hiltunen	Oulu	3,426	Social Democratic Party	Social Democrats	5 April 2023		
Hanna Holopainen	Southeast Finland	2,762	Green League	Greens	5 April 2023		
Veronika Honkasalo	Helsinki	6,100	Left Alliance	Left Alliance	5 April 2023		
Petri Honkonen	Central Finland	6,294	Centre Party	Centre Party	5 April 2023		
Inka Hopsu	Uusimaa	4,190	Green League	Greens	5 April 2023		
Hannu Hoskonen	Savo-Karelia	7,011	Centre Party	Centre Party	5 April 2023		
Laura Huhtasaari	Satakunta	8,393	Finns Party	Finns Party	5 April 2023		
Petri Huru	Satakunta	6,208	Finns Party	Finns Party	5 April 2023		
Saara Hyrkkö	Uusimaa	4,023	Green League	Greens	5 April 2023		
Anna-Kaisa Ikonen	Pirkanmaa	11,428	National Coalition Party	National Coalition Party	5 April 2023		
Tomi Immonen	Central Finland	5,293	Finns Party	Finns Party	5 April 2023		
Christoffer Ingo	Vaasa	4,802	Swedish People's Party	Swedish	16 July 2024		Replaced Anna-Maja Henriksson.
Aleksi Jäntti	Pirkanmaa	4,157	National Coalition Party	National Coalition Party	5 April 2023		
Jessi Jokelainen	Oulu	3,891	Left Alliance	Left Alliance	16 July 2024		Replaced Merja Kyllönen.
Janne Jukkola	Vaasa	3,480	National Coalition Party	National Coalition Party	5 April 2023		
Vilhelm Junnila	Varsinais-Suomi	8,303	Finns Party	Finns Party	5 April 2023		
Kaisa Juuso	Lapland	6,078	Finns Party	Finns Party	5 April 2023		
Arja Juvonen	Uusimaa	3,336	Finns Party	Finns Party	5 April 2023		
Antti Kaikkonen	Uusimaa	12,687	Centre Party	Centre Party	5 April 2023		
Atte Kaleva	Helsinki	4,913	National Coalition Party	National Coalition Party	5 April 2023		
Eeva Kalli	Satakunta	7,930	Centre Party	Centre Party	5 April 2023		
Vesa Kallio	Southeast Finland	5,663	Centre Party	Centre Party	5 April 2023		
Anne Kalmari	Central Finland	6,885	Centre Party	Centre Party	5 April 2023		
Antti Kangas	Oulu	5,566	Finns Party	Finns Party	5 April 2023		
Mika Kari	Häme	6,090	Social Democratic Party	Social Democrats	5 April 2023		
Pia Kauma	Uusimaa	6,199	National Coalition Party	National Coalition Party	5 April 2023		
Ville Kaunisto	Southeast Finland	7,224	National Coalition Party	National Coalition Party	5 April 2023		
Mari Kaunistola	Satakunta	3,030	National Coalition Party	National Coalition Party	5 April 2023		
Hilkka Kemppi	Häme	5,312	Centre Party	Centre Party	5 April 2023		
Teemu Keskisarja	Uusimaa	6,586	Finns Party	Finns Party	5 April 2023		
Pihla Keto-Huovinen	Uusimaa	5,223	National Coalition Party	National Coalition Party	5 April 2023		
Tuomas Kettunen	Oulu	7,264	Centre Party	Centre Party	5 April 2023		
Kimmo Kiljunen	Uusimaa	4,759	Social Democratic Party	Social Democrats	5 April 2023		
Marko Kilpi	Savo-Karelia	9,428	National Coalition Party	National Coalition Party	5 April 2023		
Teemu Kinnari	Häme	7,366	National Coalition Party	National Coalition Party	5 April 2023		
Krista Kiuru	Satakunta	7,861	Social Democratic Party	Social Democrats	5 April 2023		
Pauli Kiuru	Pirkanmaa	10,982	National Coalition Party	National Coalition Party	5 April 2023		
Mai Kivelä	Helsinki	6,177	Left Alliance	Left Alliance	5 April 2023		
Jani Kokko	Central Finland	4,890	Social Democratic Party	Social Democrats	5 April 2023		
Anna Kontula	Pirkanmaa	4,909	Left Alliance	Left Alliance	5 April 2023		
Ari Koponen	Uusimaa	3,021	Finns Party	Finns Party	5 April 2023		
Jukka Kopra	Southeast Finland	5,731	National Coalition Party	National Coalition Party	5 April 2023		
Jari Koskela	Satakunta	5,213	Finns Party	Finns Party	5 April 2023		
Minja Koskela	Helsinki	10,112	Left Alliance	Left Alliance	5 April 2023		
Johannes Koskinen	Häme	5,009	Social Democratic Party	Social Democrats	5 April 2023		
Hanna Kosonen	Southeast Finland	5,147	Centre Party	Centre Party	5 April 2023		
Terhi Koulumies	Helsinki	6,512	National Coalition Party	National Coalition Party	5 April 2023		
Katri Kulmuni	Lapland	8,397	Centre Party	Centre Party	5 April 2023	16 July 2024	Elected to the European Parliament, replaced by Mika Riipi.
Miapetra Kumpula-Natri	Uusimaa	5,445	Social Democratic Party	Social Democrats	5 April 2023	5 April 2023	Replaced by Helena Marttila.
Miapetra Kumpula-Natri	Uusimaa	5,445	Social Democratic Party	Social Democrats	16 July 2024		Replaced Marttila.
Antti Kurvinen	Vaasa	6,821	Centre Party	Centre Party	5 April 2023		
Johan Kvarnström	Uusimaa	4,770	Social Democratic Party	Social Democrats	5 April 2023		
Merja Kyllönen	Oulu	5,317	Left Alliance	Left Alliance	5 April 2023	16 July 2024	Elected to the European Parliament, replaced by Jessi Jokelainen.
Suna Kymäläinen	Southeast Finland	5,810	Social Democratic Party	Social Democrats	5 April 2023		
Sheikki Laakso	Southeast Finland	7,635	Finns Party	Finns Party	5 April 2023		
Milla Lahdenperä	Varsinais-Suomi	4,527	National Coalition Party	National Coalition Party	5 April 2023		
Mia Laiho	Uusimaa	8,042	National Coalition Party	National Coalition Party	5 April 2023		
Rami Lehtinen	Häme	5,636	Finns Party	Finns Party	5 April 2023		
Jarno Limnell	Uusimaa	13,917	National Coalition Party	National Coalition Party	5 April 2023		
Jarmo Lindberg	Helsinki	6,056	National Coalition Party	National Coalition Party	5 April 2023		
Aki Lindén	Varsinais-Suomi	9,272	Social Democratic Party	Social Democrats	5 April 2023		
Antti Lindtman	Uusimaa	17,866	Social Democratic Party	Social Democrats	5 April 2023		
Mika Lintilä	Vaasa	6,116	Centre Party	Centre Party	5 April 2023		
Mats Löfström	Åland	10,516	For Åland	Swedish	5 April 2023		
Markus Lohi	Lapland	4,636	Centre Party	Centre Party	5 April 2023		
Pia Lohikoski	Uusimaa	2,550	Left Alliance	Left Alliance	16 July 2024		Replaced Jussi Saramo.
Mikko Lundén	Varsinais-Suomi	5,301	Finns Party	Finns Party	5 April 2023		
Lauri Lyly	Pirkanmaa	4,533	Social Democratic Party	Social Democrats	5 April 2023		
Juha Mäenpää	Vaasa	8,045	Finns Party	Finns Party	5 April 2023		
Jani Mäkelä	Southeast Finland	5,160	Finns Party	Finns Party	5 April 2023		
Riitta Mäkinen	Central Finland	9,712	Social Democratic Party	Social Democrats	5 April 2023		
Matias Mäkynen	Vaasa	6,628	Social Democratic Party	Social Democrats	5 April 2023		
Niina Malm	Southeast Finland	8,180	Social Democratic Party	Social Democrats	5 April 2023		
Sanna Marin	Pirkanmaa	35,628	Social Democratic Party	Social Democrats	5 April 2023	12 September 2023	Resigned, replaced by Lotta Hamari.
Helena Marttila	Uusimaa	4,171	Social Democratic Party	Social Democrats	12 April 2023	16 July 2024	Replaced Miapetra Kumpula-Natri. Replaced by Kumpula-Natri.
Helena Marttila	Uusimaa	4,171	Social Democratic Party	Social Democrats	16 July 2024		Replaced Maria Guzenina.
Matias Marttinen	Satakunta	7,618	National Coalition Party	National Coalition Party	5 April 2023		
Hanna-Leena Mattila	Oulu	6,405	Centre Party	Centre Party	5 April 2023		
Timo Mehtälä	Oulu	5,497	Centre Party	Centre Party	5 April 2023		
Leena Meri	Uusimaa	6,215	Finns Party	Finns Party	5 April 2023		
Laura Meriluoto	Savo-Karelia	3,358	Left Alliance	Left Alliance	5 April 2023		
Ville Merinen	Pirkanmaa	6,274	Social Democratic Party	Social Democrats	5 April 2023		
Anna-Kristiina Mikkonen	Southeast Finland	5,483	Social Democratic Party	Social Democrats	5 April 2023		
Krista Mikkonen	Savo-Karelia	3,972	Green League	Greens	5 April 2023		
Sari Multala	Uusimaa	7,208	National Coalition Party	National Coalition Party	5 April 2023		
Kai Mykkänen	Uusimaa	15,072	National Coalition Party	National Coalition Party	5 April 2023		
Veijo Niemi	Pirkanmaa	3,135	Finns Party	Finns Party	5 April 2023		
Mira Nieminen	Häme	5,388	Finns Party	Finns Party	5 April 2023		
Saku Nikkanen	Varsinais-Suomi	5,808	Social Democratic Party	Social Democrats	5 April 2023		
Anders Norrback	Vaasa	5,927	Swedish People's Party	Swedish	5 April 2023		
Ilmari Nurminen	Pirkanmaa	4,781	Social Democratic Party	Social Democrats	5 April 2023		
Maria Ohisalo	Helsinki	6,937	Green League	Greens	5 April 2023	16 July 2024	Elected to the European Parliament, replaced by Alviina Alametsä.
Olga Oinas-Panuma	Oulu	5,173	Centre Party	Centre Party	5 April 2023		
Johanna Ojala-Niemelä	Lapland	7,110	Social Democratic Party	Social Democrats	5 April 2023		
Mikko Ollikainen	Vaasa	5,397	Swedish People's Party	Swedish	5 April 2023		
Petteri Orpo	Varsinais-Suomi	17,432	National Coalition Party	National Coalition Party	5 April 2023		
Peter Östman	Vaasa	6,444	Christian Democrats	Christian Democrats	5 April 2023		
Jouni Ovaska	Pirkanmaa	6,376	Centre Party	Centre Party	5 April 2023		
Martin Paasi	Uusimaa	4,534	National Coalition Party	National Coalition Party	16 July 2024		Replaced Pekka Toveri.
Susanne Päivärinta	Uusimaa	6,909	National Coalition Party	National Coalition Party	5 April 2023		
Karoliina Partanen	Savo-Karelia	7,172	National Coalition Party	National Coalition Party	5 April 2023		
Aino-Kaisa Pekonen	Häme	4,251	Left Alliance	Left Alliance	5 April 2023		
Mauri Peltokangas	Vaasa	14,548	Finns Party	Finns Party	5 April 2023		
Eemeli Peltonen	Uusimaa	5,747	Social Democratic Party	Social Democrats	5 April 2023	19 August 2025	Passed away on 19 August 2025 due to possible suicide.
Pinja Perholehto	Uusimaa	5,869	Social Democratic Party	Social Democrats	5 April 2023		
Jorma Piisinen	Uusimaa	7,131	Finns Party	Finns Party	5 April 2023		
Jenni Pitko	Oulu	3,699	Green League	Greens	5 April 2023		
Mikko Polvinen	Oulu	4,291	Finns Party	Finns Party	5 April 2023		
Mika Poutala	Uusimaa	4,883	Christian Democrats	Christian Democrats	5 April 2023		
Sakari Puisto	Pirkanmaa	6,592	Finns Party	Finns Party	5 April 2023		
Riikka Purra	Uusimaa	42,594	Finns Party	Finns Party	5 April 2023		
Lulu Ranne	Häme	10,665	Finns Party	Finns Party	5 April 2023		
Mari Rantanen	Helsinki	3,826	Finns Party	Finns Party	5 April 2023		
Piritta Rantanen	Central Finland	4,753	Social Democratic Party	Social Democrats	5 April 2023		
Hanna Räsänen	Savo-Karelia	5,849	Centre Party	Centre Party	5 April 2023		
Joona Räsänen	Uusimaa	4,540	Social Democratic Party	Social Democrats	5 April 2023		
Päivi Räsänen	Häme	6,968	Christian Democrats	Christian Democrats	5 April 2023		
Merja Rasinkangas	Oulu	4,116	Finns Party	Finns Party	16 July 2024		Replaced Sebastian Tynkkynen.
Nasima Razmyar	Helsinki	14,108	Social Democratic Party	Social Democrats	5 April 2023		
Mika Riipi	Lapland	2,221	Centre Party	Centre Party	16 July 2024		Replaced Katri Kulmuni.
Minna Reijonen	Savo-Karelia	6,687	Finns Party	Finns Party	5 April 2023		
Anne Rintamäki	Vaasa	5,502	Finns Party	Finns Party	5 April 2023		
Paula Risikko	Vaasa	8,350	National Coalition Party	National Coalition Party	5 April 2023		
Jari Ronkainen	Häme	4,820	Finns Party	Finns Party	5 April 2023		
Onni Rostila	Uusimaa	5,027	Finns Party	Finns Party	5 April 2023		
Wille Rydman	Helsinki	3,919	Finns Party	Finns Party	5 April 2023		
Annika Saarikko	Varsinais-Suomi	8,572	Centre Party	Centre Party	5 April 2023		
Aura Salla	Helsinki	4,189	National Coalition Party	National Coalition Party	5 April 2023	16 July 2024	Elected to the European Parliament, replaced by Maaret Castrén.
Tere Sammallahti	Uusimaa	5,277	National Coalition Party	National Coalition Party	5 April 2023		
Jussi Saramo	Uusimaa	4,944	Left Alliance	Left Alliance	5 April 2023	16 July 2024	Elected to the European Parliament, replaced by Pia Lohikoski.
Hanna Sarkkinen	Oulu	6,758	Left Alliance	Left Alliance	5 April 2023		
Sari Sarkomaa	Helsinki	5,840	National Coalition Party	National Coalition Party	5 April 2023		
Arto Satonen	Pirkanmaa	6,029	National Coalition Party	National Coalition Party	5 April 2023		
Sami Savio	Pirkanmaa	6,012	Finns Party	Finns Party	5 April 2023		
Mikko Savola	Vaasa	6,770	Centre Party	Centre Party	5 April 2023		
Sara Seppänen	Lapland	11,153	Finns Party	Finns Party	5 April 2023		
Pia Sillanpää	Vaasa	3,781	Finns Party	Finns Party	5 April 2023		
Jenna Simula	Oulu	9,481	Finns Party	Finns Party	5 April 2023		
Markku Siponen	Savo-Karelia	5,539	Centre Party	Centre Party	5 April 2023		
Saara-Sofia Sirén	Varsinais-Suomi	6,679	National Coalition Party	National Coalition Party	5 April 2023		
Ville Skinnari	Häme	5,983	Social Democratic Party	Social Democrats	5 April 2023		
Joakim Strand	Vaasa	7,079	Swedish People's Party	Swedish	5 April 2023		
Jaana Strandman	Southeast Finland	5,179	Finns Party	Finns Party	5 April 2023		
Timo Suhonen	Savo-Karelia	6,510	Social Democratic Party	Social Democrats	5 April 2023		
Mari-Leena Talvitie	Oulu	5,573	National Coalition Party	National Coalition Party	5 April 2023		
Sari Tanus	Pirkanmaa	6,117	Christian Democrats	Christian Democrats	5 April 2023		
Ville Tavio	Varsinais-Suomi	15,071	Finns Party	Finns Party	5 April 2023		
Pekka Toveri	Uusimaa	9,667	National Coalition Party	National Coalition Party	5 April 2023	16 July 2024	Elected to the European Parliament, replaced by Martin Paasi.
Tytti Tuppurainen	Oulu	12,272	Social Democratic Party	Social Democrats	5 April 2023		
Oras Tynkkynen	Pirkanmaa	5,401	Green League	Greens	5 April 2023		
Sebastian Tynkkynen	Oulu	17,378	Finns Party	Finns Party	5 April 2023	16 July 2024	Elected to the European Parliament, replaced by Merja Rasinkangas.
Tuula Väätäinen	Savo-Karelia	4,412	Social Democratic Party	Social Democrats	5 April 2023		
Ville Vähämäki	Oulu	4,927	Finns Party	Finns Party	5 April 2023		
Ville Valkonen	Varsinais-Suomi	5,732	National Coalition Party	National Coalition Party	5 April 2023		
Oskari Valtola	Southeast Finland	4,335	National Coalition Party	National Coalition Party	5 April 2023		
Elina Valtonen	Helsinki	32,562	National Coalition Party	National Coalition Party	5 April 2023		
Ville Väyrynen	Central Finland	7,169	National Coalition Party	National Coalition Party	5 April 2023		
Heikki Vestman	Uusimaa	9,836	National Coalition Party	National Coalition Party	5 April 2023		
Joakim Vigelius	Pirkanmaa	10,113	Finns Party	Finns Party	5 April 2023		
Juha Viitala	Satakunta	4,238	Social Democratic Party	Social Democrats	5 April 2023		
Pia Viitanen	Pirkanmaa	4,112	Social Democratic Party	Social Democrats	5 April 2023		
Sofia Vikman	Pirkanmaa	7,548	National Coalition Party	National Coalition Party	5 April 2023		
Eerikki Viljanen	Uusimaa	2,787	Centre Party	Centre Party	5 April 2023		
Sofia Virta	Varsinais-Suomi	5,533	Green League	Greens	5 April 2023		
Timo Vornanen	Savo-Karelia	6,474	Finns Party	Finns Party	5 April 2023	2 May 2024	Expelled from the Finns Party parliamentary group following a shooting incident outside of a karaoke bar in Helsinki.
Timo Vornanen	Savo-Karelia	6,474	Independent	None	3 May 2024	22 May 2024	
Timo Vornanen	Savo-Karelia	6,474	Independent	Timo Vornanen	23 May 2024		Formed eponymous parliamentary group.
Sinuhe Wallinheimo	Central Finland	7,478	National Coalition Party	National Coalition Party	5 April 2023		
Paula Werning	Southeast Finland	5,046	Social Democratic Party	Social Democrats	5 April 2023		
Henrik Wickström	Uusimaa	7,306	Swedish People's Party	Swedish	5 April 2023		
Johannes Yrttiaho	Varsinais-Suomi	1,630	Left Alliance	Left Alliance	16 July 2024		Replaced Li Andersson.
Ben Zyskowicz	Helsinki	12,603	National Coalition Party	National Coalition Party	5 April 2023		
