= 2026 in Finland =

- Decades: 2000s; 2010s; 2020s; 2030s
- See also: Other events of 2026; Timeline of Finnish history

Events in the year 2026 in Finland.

== Incumbents ==
- President: Alexander Stubb
- Prime Minister: Petteri Orpo
- Parliament: 2023–2027 Eduskunta/Riksdag
- Speaker of the Parliament: Jussi Halla-aho

== Events ==
=== January ===
- 1 January – Police arrest two people suspected of damaging a submarine telecommunications cable in the Gulf of Finland that runs between Finland and Estonia.

=== March ===
- 6 March – Finland boycotts the opening ceremony of the 2026 Winter Paralympics in Italy in protest over Russian athletes being allowed to compete under the Russian flag after the lifting of sanctions imposed over the Russian invasion of Ukraine in 2022.
- 26 March – The Supreme Court of Finland convicts Christian Democrats politician Päivi Räsänen and bishop Juhana Pohjola of hate speech against gay people. and orders Räsänen to pay a fine of 1,800 euros.
- 29 March – Two Ukrainian drones stray into Finnish airspace and crash near Kouvola. One of them is destroyed in a controlled detonation by Finnish authorities.

=== May ===
- 16 May – Finland's Linda Lampenius and Pete Parkkonen finish sixth at Eurovision 2026 in Austria with their single "Liekinheitin".

=== June ===
- 17 June – Parliament votes to loosen the country's decades-old restrictions on importing or moving nuclear weapons, allowing for easier transport of such weaponry between NATO members and improving the alliance's nuclear deterrence.

=== July ===
- 26 July – Thirteen structures designed by Alvar Aalto and his wives are designated as UNESCO World Heritage Sites.

=== September ===
- 8 September — Finland sanctions products from Israeli settlements in the West Bank. (Note: However, Finland clarified that settlement trade restrictions are contingent on EU action.)
- 9–26 September – 2026 Men's European Volleyball Championship in Bulgaria, Finland, Italy and Romania

=== November ===
- 2 November – A cyberattack is carried out on refrigeration systems of supermarkets across seven European countries including Finland, resulting in financial losses caused by food spoilage.
- 21 November – The Russian cargo vessel Sparta II is set on fire following a suspected Ukrainian drone attack in the Gulf of Finland, causing it to drift into Finnish territorial waters.

== Holidays ==
- 1 January – New Year's Day
- 6 January – Epiphany
- 3 April – Good Friday
- 5 April – Easter Sunday
- 6 April – Easter Monday
- 1 May – May Day
- 14 May – Ascension Day
- 24 May – Whit Sunday
- 20 June – Midsummer Day
- 31 October – All Saints' Day
- 6 December – Independence Day
- 24 December – Christmas Eve
- 25 December – Christmas Day
- 26 December – Boxing Day

== Art and entertainment ==
- List of Finnish submissions for the Academy Award for Best International Feature Film
- List of Finnish films of the 2020s

== Deaths ==
- 2 January – Ritva Auvinen, 93, opera singer.
- 15 January – Pertti Voutilainen, 85, banker and businessman.
- 20 January – Arvo Siikamäki, 82, sculptor.
- 5 February – Pentti Lindegren, 86, ice hockey player (HIFK, AIK IF) and commentator.
- 30 May – Jutta Zilliacus, 100, journalist and author, MP (1975–1987).
- 3 June – Jouko Purontakanen, 78, sports executive.
- 5 June – Jokke Seppälä, 72, musician.
- 7 June – Arvi Lind, 85, television news presenter (Yle TV1).
- 9 August – Erkki Pystynen, 96, speaker of Parliament (1983–1986).
- 28 September – Seela Sella, 89, actress (Sibelius, Kalteva torni).
- 18 October – Gary Heffern, 72, punk rock singer (The Penetrators).
- 19 October – Hilkka Kinnunen, 101, soprano, actress (Song of Warsaw, April's Coming), and theatre director.
- 9 November – Lenita Airisto, 89, journalist and socialite.

== See also ==
- 2026 in the European Union
- 2026 in Europe
