= 2025 in Finland =

- Decades: 2000s; 2010s; 2020s
- See also: Other events of 2025; Timeline of Finnish history

Events in the year 2025 in Finland.

== Incumbents ==
- President: Alexander Stubb
- Prime Minister: Petteri Orpo
- Parliament: 2023–2027 Eduskunta/Riksdag
- Speaker of the Parliament: Jussi Halla-aho

== Events ==
=== March ===
- 14 March – Yan Petrovsky, a Russian national and former commander of the far-right Russian nationalist paramilitary Rusich Group who was arrested in Finland in 2023, is sentenced by a court in Helsinki to life imprisonment for war crimes committed during the Russian invasion of Ukraine.

=== April ===
- 13 April:
  - 2025 Finnish county elections
  - 2025 Finnish municipal elections

=== May ===
- 8 May – An F/A-18 Hornet of the Finnish Air Force crashes during a rehearsal for an airshow near Rovaniemi Airport. The pilot ejects and is rescued.
- 17 May –
  - Two Robinson R44 civilian helicopters collide mid-air and crash in a forested area while en route from Tallinn to Piikajärvi Airfield near Eura, Satakunta. All five occupants of both helicopters, including Estonian businessmen Oleg Sõnajalg and Priit Jaagant, are killed.
  - Finland's Erika Vikman finishes in 11th place at Eurovision 2025 in Switzerland with the single "Ich Komme".

=== June ===
- 19 June – The Parliament of Finland votes 157–8 to withdraw Finland from the Ottawa Treaty on Landmines.

=== July ===
- 3 July – Multiple people are injured in a knife attack near a shopping centre in Tampere. A suspect is arrested.
- 15 July – A law barring Russian and Belarusian nationals from buying property in Finland on national security grounds comes into effect.

=== August ===
- 19 August – Incumbent SDP MP Eemeli Peltonen dies from suicide inside the Parliament House in Helsinki.
- 27 August–14 September – EuroBasket 2025 in Cyprus, Finland, Latvia and Poland

=== September ===
- 1 September – The Päijät-Häme District Court sentences Nigerian-born Biafran separatist leader Simon Ekpa, who has been living in exile in Lahti, to six years' imprisonment for terrorism, tax fraud and ethical violations.
- 14 September – Finland finishes in fourth place at EuroBasket 2025 after losing to Greece 92-89 at the final in Latvia.

=== October ===
- 3 October – The Helsinki District Court dismisses a case against the captain and two senior officers of the Cook Islands-registered oil tanker Eagle S over their alleged involvement in the 2024 Estlink 2 incident, citing lack of jurisdiction.

=== December ===
- 17 December –
  - The government seizes a villa owned by sanctioned Russian billionaire Boris Rotenberg in Hanko due to unpaid property taxes.
  - Prime minister Orpo issues an apology to citizens of Japan, China and South Korea over the posting of derogatory images by Finns Party MPs on social media.
- 28 December – Around 60,000 homes nationwide lose electricity, while two aircraft at Kittilä Airport undergo a runway excursion due to Storm Johannes.
- 31 December – The St. Vincent and the Grenadines-flagged vessel Fitburg is intercepted by Finnish authorities on suspicion of damaging an undersea telecommunications cable in the Gulf of Finland running from Helsinki to Tallinn, Estonia, and owned by Elisa.

== Deaths ==
- 8 February – Yrjö Kukkapuro, 91, interior architect and furniture designer
- 13 August – Klaus Wirzenius, 37, musician
- 19 August – Eemeli Peltonen, 30, MP (since 2023)
- 30 August – Juhani Markola, 83, singer
- 26 September – Esa Saario, 93, actor
- 28 September – Mika Immonen, 52, pool player
- 4 November – Elina Salo, 89, actress
- 6 December – Esko Seppänen, 79, MP and MEP
- 6 December – Lars Svedberg, 80, actor and theatre director
- 8 December – Eila Roine, 94, actress
- 20 or 21 December – Taisto Tähkämaa, 101, politician.

== Holidays ==
- 1 January – New Year's Day
- 6 January – Epiphany
- 18 April – Good Friday
- 20 April – Easter Sunday
- 21 April – Easter Monday
- 1 May – May Day
- 29 May – Ascension Day
- 8 June – Whit Sunday
- 21 June – Midsummer Day
- 1 November – All Saints' Day
- 6 December – Independence Day
- 24 December – Christmas Eve
- 25 December – Christmas Day
- 26 December – Boxing Day

== Art and entertainment ==
- List of Finnish submissions for the Academy Award for Best International Feature Film
- List of Finnish films of the 2020s

== See also ==
- 2025 in the European Union
- 2025 in Europe
