= Ministry of Education and Culture (Finland) =

Government ministry of Finland

- Finnish: Opetus- ja kulttuuriministeriö Swedish: Undervisnings- och kulturministeriet
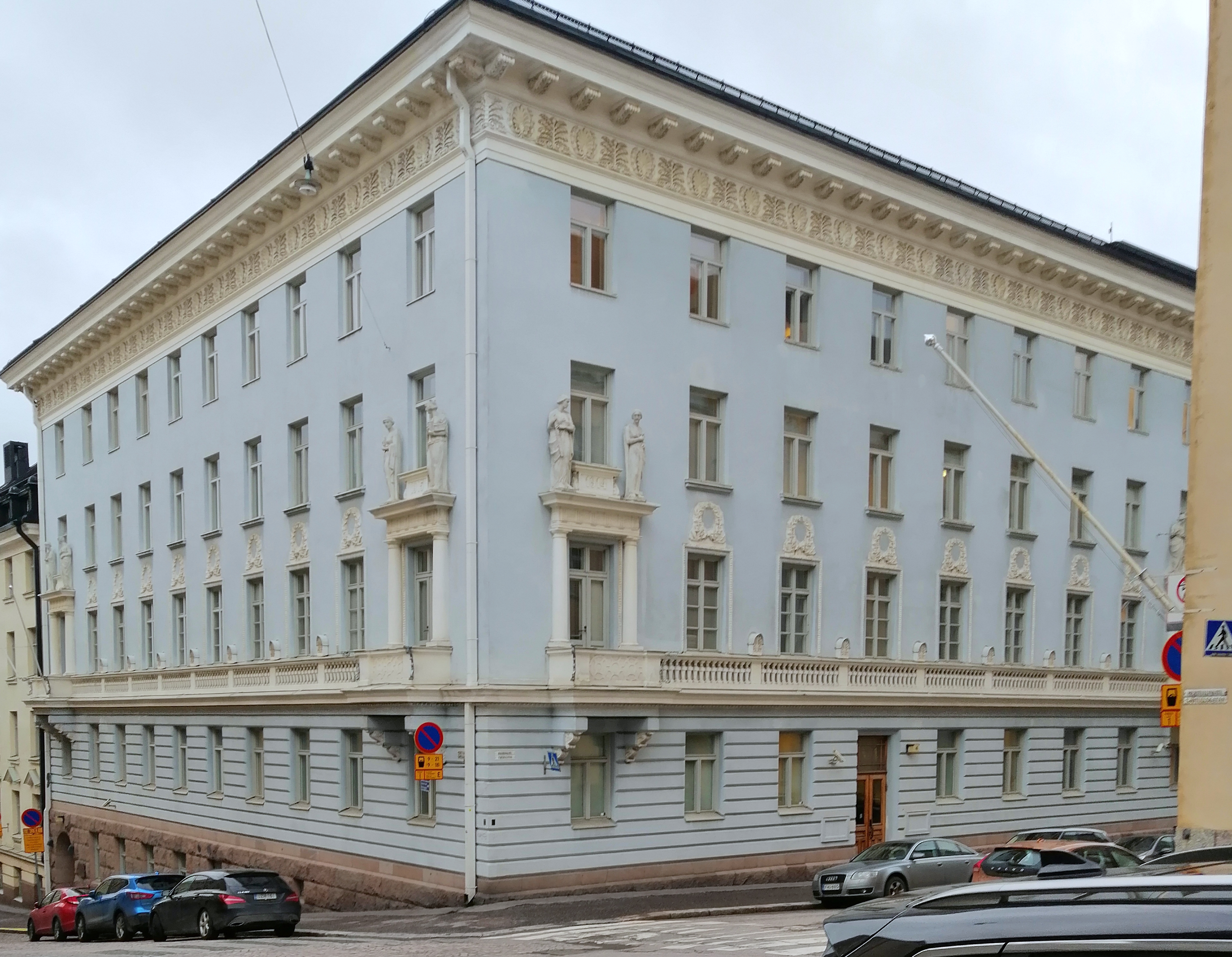
- Building of the Finnish Ministry of Education and Culture on the intersection of Meritullinkatu and Rauhankatu streets in Helsinki.

Agency overview
- Jurisdiction: Finnish Government
- Annual budget: €6.6 billion (2013)
- Ministers responsible: Anders Adlercreutz, Minister of Education; Mari-Leena Talvitie, Minister of Science and Culture; Mika Poutala, Minister of Youth, Sport, and Physical Activity

The Ministry of Education and Culture (Finnish: Opetus- ja kulttuuriministeriö, Swedish: Undervisnings- och kulturministeriet) is one of the twelve ministries in Finland. It prepares laws and oversees the administration of matters relating to education (such as daycare, schools and universities), and culture (such as museums, libraries and arts), as well as sports and science.

The Ministry of Education and Culture is one of the oldest ministries in Finland. It was started as the Ecclesiastical Department in 1809, when the Grand Duchy of Finland was an autonomous part of the Russian Empire.

== See also ==
- Education in Finland
- List of Finnish ministries
