= Minister for European Affairs, Culture and Sport =

Finnish cabinet position

The Minister for European Affairs, Culture and Sport (Finnish: Eurooppa-, kulttuuri- ja urheiluministeri, Swedish: Europa-, kultur och idrottsminister) was one of the ministerial portfolios which comprised the Sipilä Cabinet. The responsibilities of the Minister for European Affairs, the Minister of Culture, and the Minister of Sport were combined in the portfolio.

The last holder of the portfolio was Sampo Terho of Blue Reform in the Sipilä Cabinet.

The Orpo Cabinet's incumbent Minister for European Affairs is Joakim Strand. The incumbent Minister of Science and Culture is Mari-Leena Talvitie. The incumbent Minister of Youth, Sport, and Physical Activity is Mika Poutala.
