= 2027 in Finland =

- Decades: 2000s; 2010s; 2020s
- See also: Other events of 2027; Timeline of Finnish history

Events in the year 2027 in Finland.

== Events ==
=== Predicted and scheduled events ===
- 18 April – 2027 Finnish parliamentary election
- 16–27 June – EuroBasket Women 2027 in Belgium, Finland, Lithuania and Sweden

== Holidays ==
- 1 January – New Year's Day
- 6 January – Epiphany
- 26 March – Good Friday
- 28 March – Easter Sunday
- 29 March – Easter Monday
- 1 May – May Day
- 14 May – Ascension Day
- 24 May – Whit Sunday
- 20 June – Midsummer Day
- 31 October – All Saints' Day
- 6 December – Independence Day
- 24 December – Christmas Eve
- 25 December – Christmas Day
- 26 December – Boxing Day

== Art and entertainment ==
- List of Finnish submissions for the Academy Award for Best International Feature Film
- List of Finnish films of the 2020s
