= Yrttiaho =

Yrttiaho is a Finnish surname. Notable people with the surname include:

- Johannes Yrttiaho (born 1980), Finnish politician
- Jyrki Yrttiaho (1952–2021), Finnish politician
