= Liberal adult education in Finland =

The Finnish Ministry of Education and Culture (Finland) defines the goal of liberal adult education as "From the basis of lifelong learning to promote the diversified development of people and to organize education that supports society's integrity, equality and active citizenship". Applying to liberal adult education is possible for anyone without the requirements of previous studies. The education does not grant you a degree, and its teaching content is not regulated by law. The educational institutions providing liberal adult education include civic centers, folk high schools, sports training centers, summer universities and study centers. The education is non-formal, in other words it does not lead to a degree.

== Goals of liberal adult education ==
Educational goals and content are determined by the educational institutions, such as municipalities, joint ventures, associations, foundations or limited companies. The education includes both a variety of value based and neutral activities. Background communities can represent different worldviews and religious views or act based on the local and regional educational needs.

== Organizing liberal adult education ==
The educational organizations of liberal adult education are independently responsible for their training and development. Studying varies from evening-courses to long-term courses, distance learning and intensive courses.

== Liberal adult education teachers ==
The liberal adult education teachers must have an appropriate university degree and have at least 60 credits worth of pedagogical teacher studies

== See also ==
- Education in Finland
- Ministry of Education and Culture (Finland)
- Higher education
