= Marttila (surname) =

Marttila is a Finnish surname. Notable people with the surname include:

- Elena Marttila (1923–2022), Russian painter of Finnish descent
- Helena Marttila (born 1984), Finnish politician
- Otto Marttila (1879–1955), Finnish farmer and politician
- John Marttila (1940–2018), American political consultant and strategist
