= Lotta Hamari =

Member of the Parliament of Finland
- Incumbent
- Assumed office 14 September 2023
- Constituency: Pirkanmaan

Personal details
- Born: 1985 (age 40–41)
- Citizenship: Finland
- Party: SDP
- Children: 2

Anna Lotta Hamari (née Kauhanen; born 1985) is a Finnish politician who currently serves as a member of the Finnish Parliament. She won the 2023 Finnish parliamentary election as a substitute candidate from the Pirkanmaa constituency with 2,675 votes. Hamari holds a doctorate in health sciences and has previously worked as a physiotherapist and as a researcher at the Finnish Foundation for Nursing Research. Hamari has two children. Hamari was elected to Parliament after former Prime Minister Sanna Marin resigned.

Hamari has played basketball at the Finnish Championship level. She won the Finnish Championship gold medal with BC Nokia in the 2004–2005 season.

== See also ==
- List of members of the Parliament of Finland, 2023–2027
