= Petri Honkonen =

Finnish politician (born 1987)

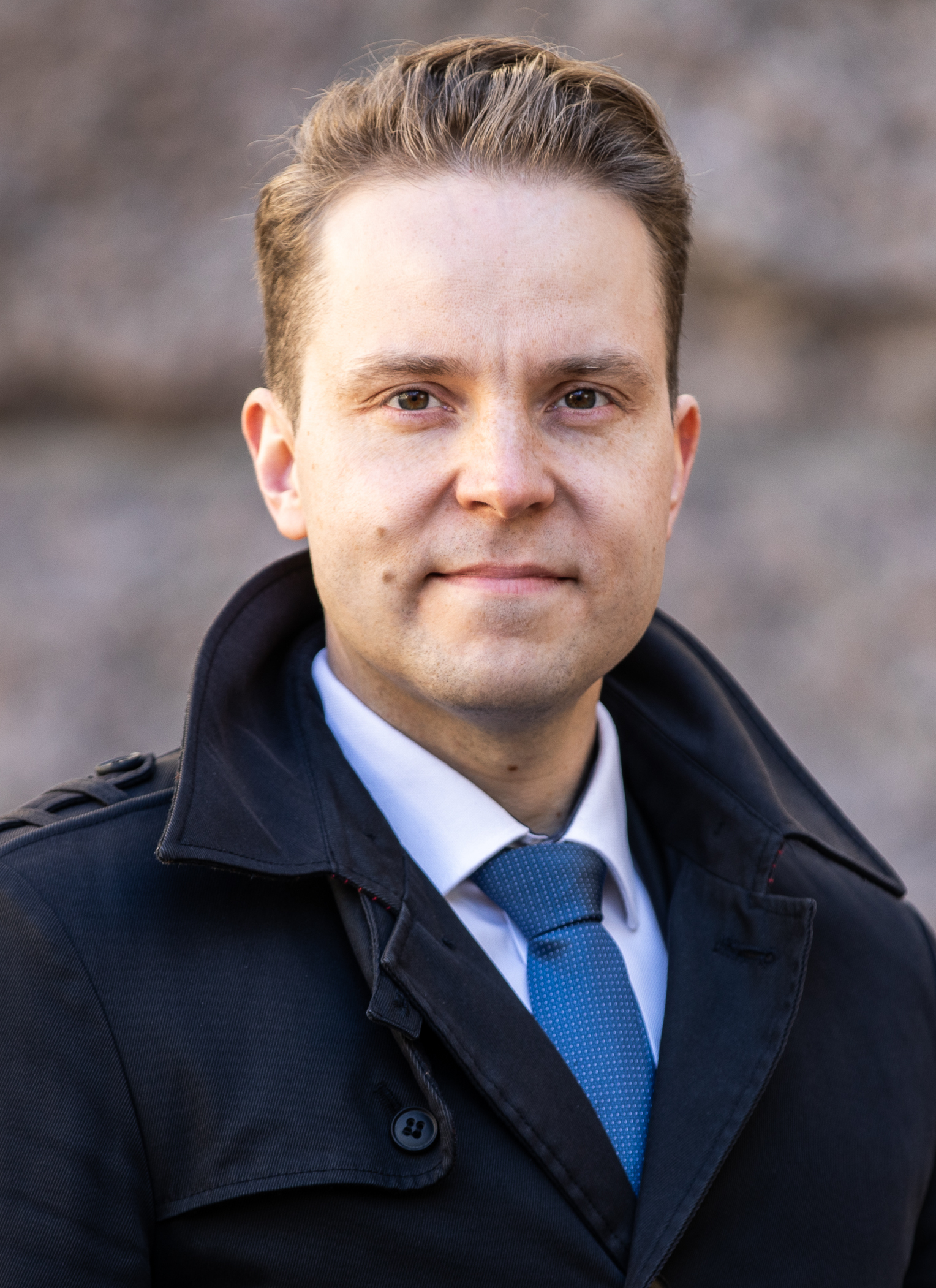

Minister of Science and Culture
- In office 29 April 2022 – 20 June 2023
- Prime Minister: Sanna Marin
- Preceded by: Antti Kurvinen
- Succeeded by: Sari Multala

Member of the Finnish Parliament for Central Finland
- Incumbent
- Assumed office 22 April 2015

Personal details
- Born: 29 July 1987 (age 39) Pylkönmäki, Central Finland, Finland
- Party: Centre Party
- Education: University of Jyväskylä

Petri Erkki Olavi Honkonen (born 29 July 1987) is a Finnish politician, representing the Centre Party in the Parliament of Finland since 2015. He was born in Pylkönmäki, and was elected to the Parliament from the Central Finland constituency in the 2015 elections with 2,978 votes.

== Life ==
Honkonen completed a teacher training program at the University of Jyväskylä in 2014, earning a Master of Arts degree. Since the 2015 parliamentary elections, he has been a member of the Finnish Parliament representing the Central Finland constituency.
