= Leena Luhtanen =

Finnish politician (born 1941)

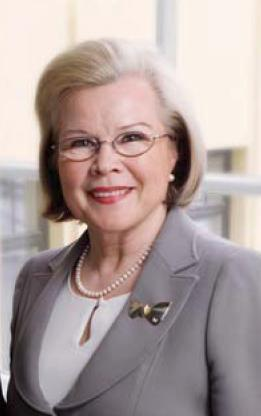
- Luhtanen in 2005

Minister of Justice
- In office 23 September 2005 – 19 April 2007
- Prime Minister: Matti Vanhanen
- Preceded by: Johannes Koskinen
- Succeeded by: Tuija Brax

Minister of Transport and Communications
- In office 17 April 2003 – 22 September 2005
- Prime Minister: Anneli Jäätteenmäki; Matti Vanhanen
- Preceded by: Kimmo Sasi
- Succeeded by: Susanna Huovinen

Personal details
- Born: 12 February 1941 (age 85) Kuopio, Finland
- Party: Social Democratic Party
- Spouse: Oiva Luhtanen

Leena Luhtanen (née Nikulainen; born 12 February 1941) is a Finnish politician and a former member of the cabinet. Luhtanen is a member of the Social Democratic Party, and served in the parliament from 1991 until 2007.

She served as the minister of transport and communications in Matti Vanhanen's first cabinet from 2003 to 2005, and thereafter as the minister of justice until the parliamentary elections of 2007. She was not re-elected.

Luhtanen was born in Kuopio, and has been a member of Espoo city council since 1985.

Political offices
Preceded by Kimmo Sasi	Minister of Transport and Communications; 2003—2005	Succeeded by Susanna Huovinen
Preceded by Johannes Koskinen	Minister of Justice; 2005—2007	Succeeded by Tuija Brax
