= Heikki Vestman =

Finnish politician

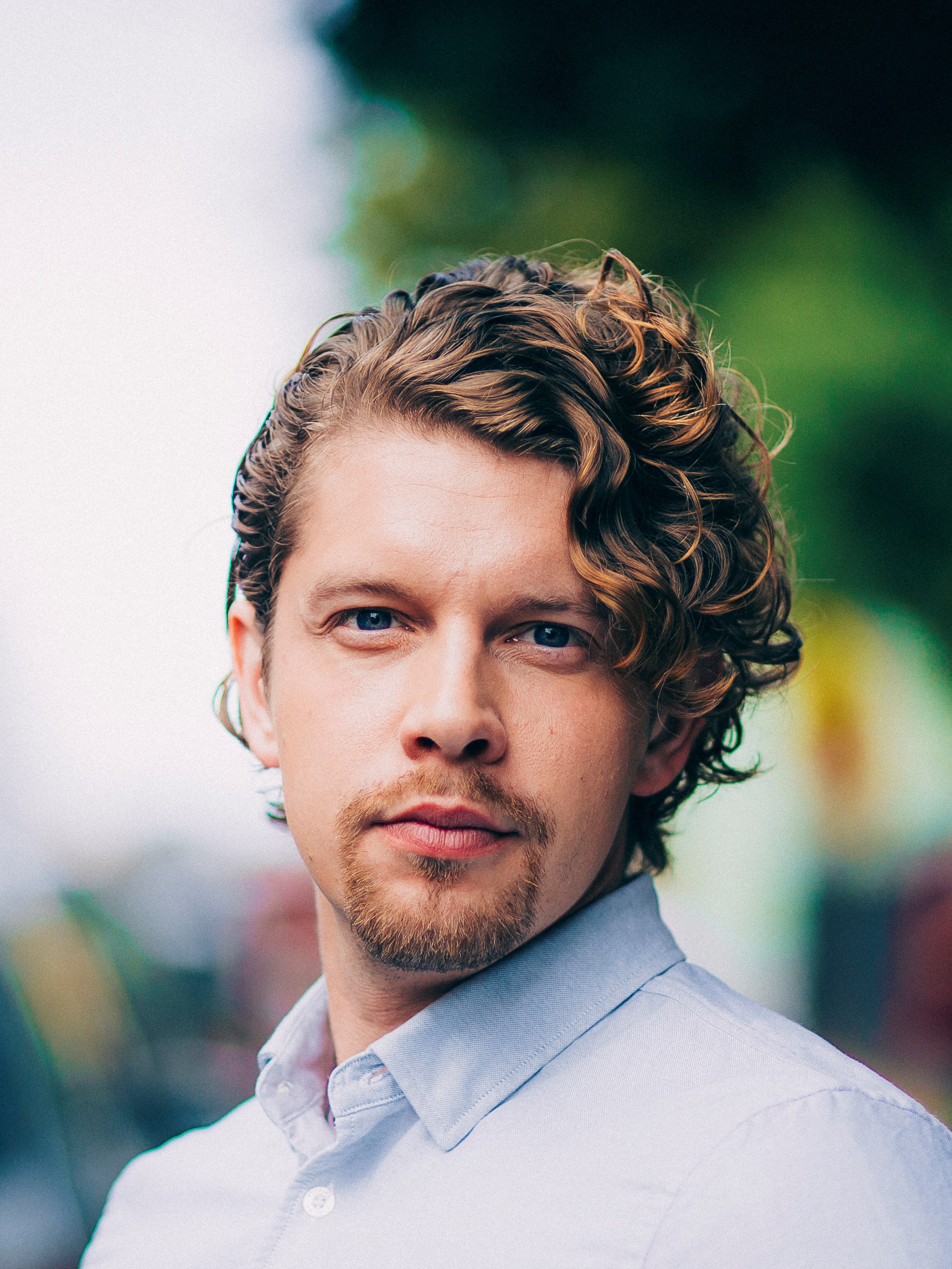
- Heikki Vestman in 2019

Member of the Finnish Parliament for Uusimaa
- Incumbent
- Assumed office 17 April 2019

Personal details
- Born: 8 April 1985 (age 41) Kerava, Uusimaa, Finland
- Party: National Coalition Party
- Education: University of Helsinki
- Profession: Lawyer

Heikki Vestman (born 8 April 1985, in Kerava) is a Finnish politician currently serving in the Parliament of Finland for the National Coalition Party at the Uusimaa constituency.

== Career ==
From 2011-2013, he worked as an associate and an associate trainee are Roschier, Attorneys Ltd., and then started as a lawyer at Energy Authority in 2013. He took a leave of absence from this job upon becoming an MP.

== Education ==
He graduated with a Master of Laws in 2012 from the University of Helsinki
