= Minister for European Affairs and Ownership Steering =

Finnish cabinet position

The Minister for European Affairs and Ownership Steering (Finnish: Suomen eurooppa- ja omistajaohjausministeri, Swedish: Finlands europa- och ägarstyringsminister) is one of the Finnish Government's ministerial positions.

The Orpo Cabinet's incumbent Minister for European Affairs is since the 5th of July 2024 Joakim Strand of the Swedish People's Party who replaced Anders Adlercreutz the current Minister of Education (Finland).
