= Sandra Bergqvist =

Finnish politician (born 1980)

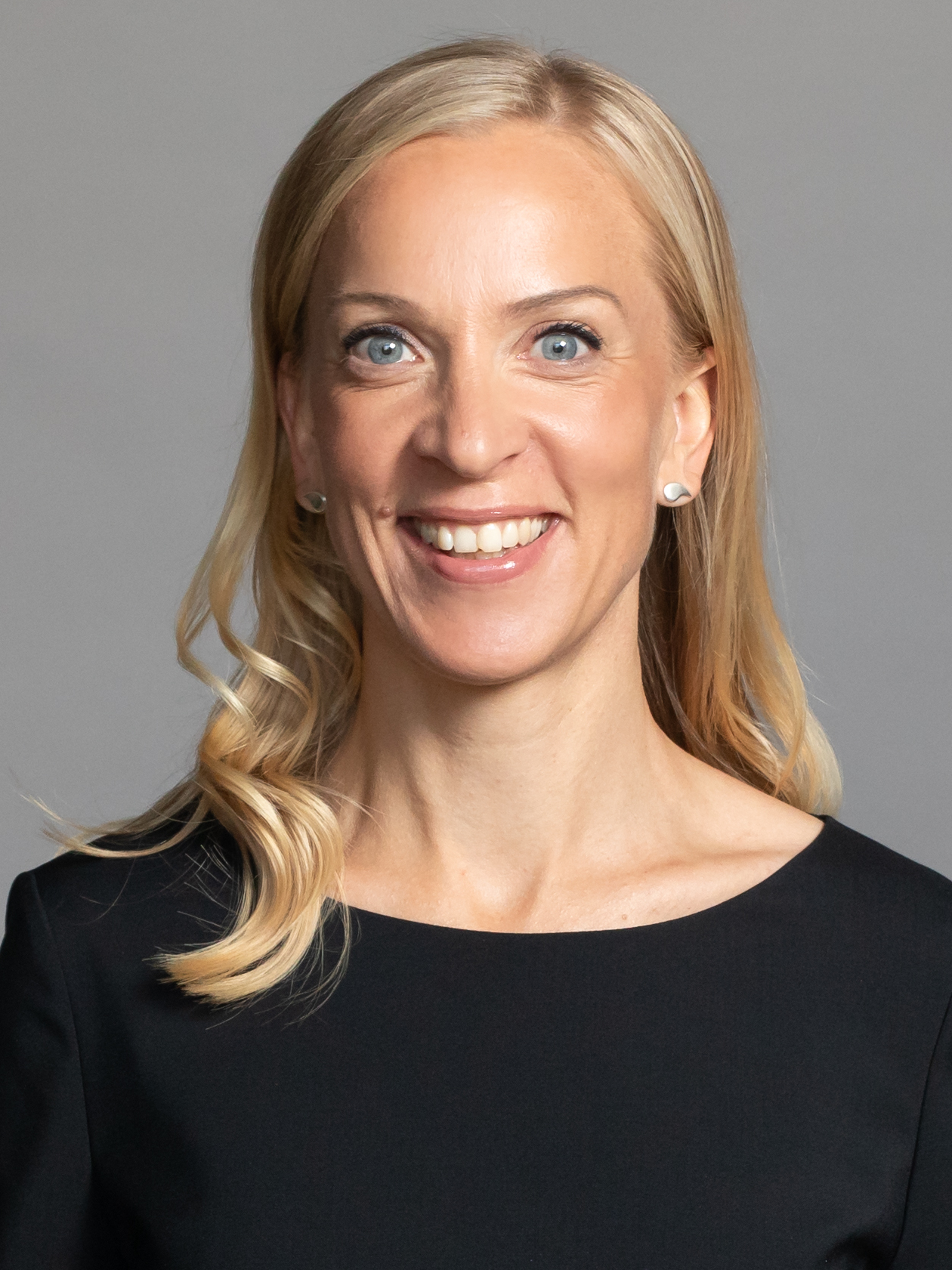
- Berqvist in 2023

Minister of Youth, Sport and Physical Activity
- In office 20 June 2023 – 13 June 2025
- Prime Minister: Petteri Orpo
- Preceded by: Position established
- Succeeded by: Mika Poutala

Member of Parliament for Finland Proper
- Incumbent
- Assumed office 17 April 2019

Personal details
- Born: 14 April 1980 (age 46) Nagu, Finland Proper, Finland
- Party: Swedish People's
- Education: Åbo Akademi

Sandra Ida Christina Bergqvist (born 14 April 1980) is a Finnish politician serving as member of parliament for the Finland Proper constituency. She was elected to the Parliament in 2019. She is also the chairperson of the Swedish Assembly of Finland.

In June 2023, she was appointed Minister of Youth, Sport and Physical Activity in the Orpo Cabinet.
