= Tuija Brax =

Finnish politician (born 1965)

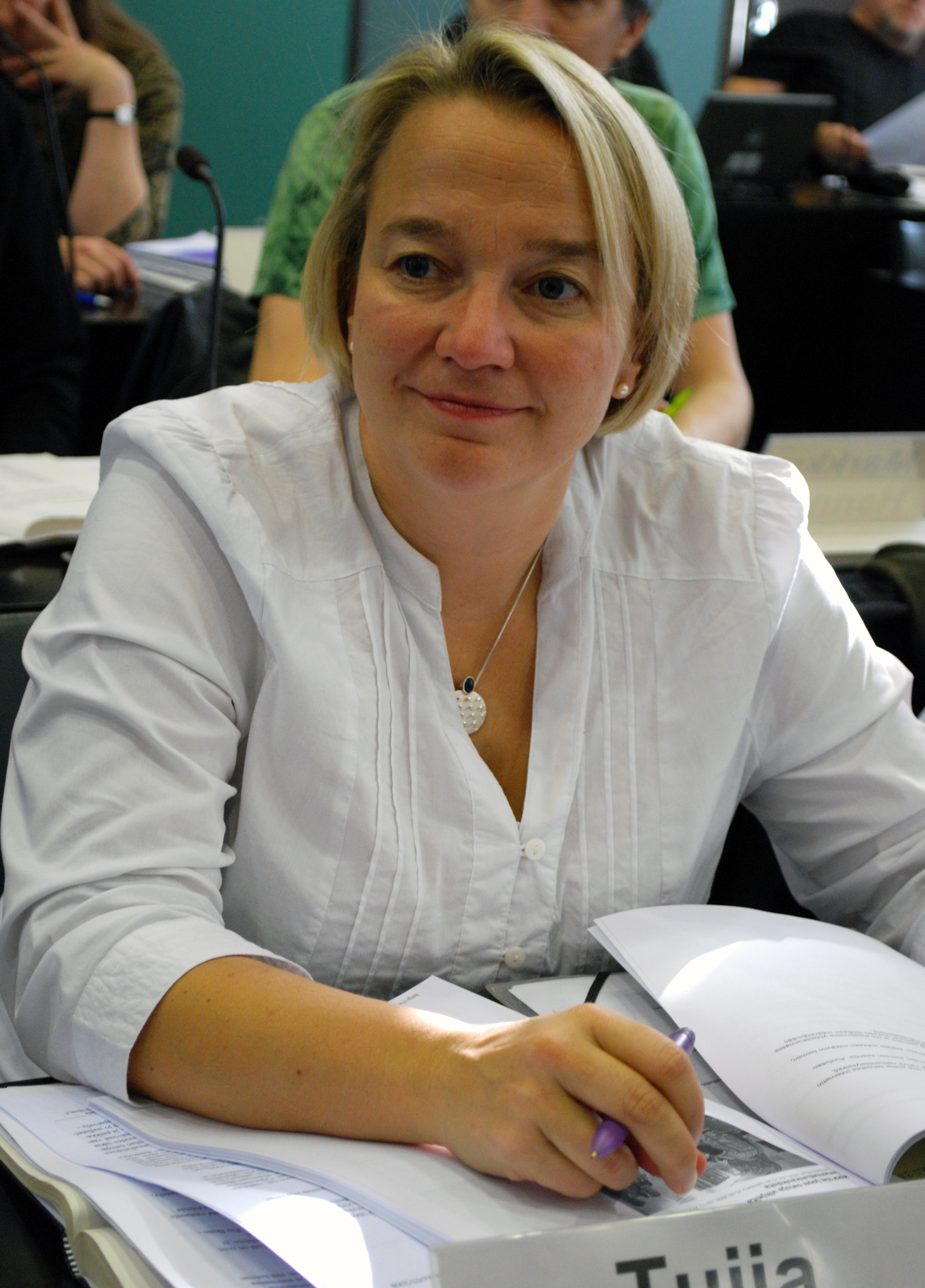
- Tuija Brax in 2008.

Minister of Justice
- In office 19 April 2007 – 22 June 2011
- Prime Minister: Matti Vanhanen; Mari Kiviniemi
- Preceded by: Leena Luhtanen
- Succeeded by: Anna-Maja Henriksson

Personal details
- Born: 6 January 1965 (age 61) Helsinki, Finland
- Party: Green League
- Spouse: Antti Brax
- Children: 2

Tuija Kaarina Brax (née Karvonen; born 6 January 1965 in Helsinki) is a Finnish politician and former Minister of Justice. She is a Member of Finnish Parliament, representing the Green League. She was first elected to the Parliament in 1995. She has been the Minister of Justice in Matti Vanhanen's second cabinet and Mari Kiviniemi's cabinet.

She has also been a member of the Helsinki City Council from 1993 and she is active in various professional sport organizations.

Brax has a Master's degree in law from the University of Helsinki. Brax has also served as the Chair of the Legal Affairs Committee in the Finnish Parliament. She is married to Antti Brax. They have two children, Aarni (born 1993) and Arttu (born 1997).

Political offices
Preceded by Leena Luhtanen	Minister of Justice; 2007–2011	Succeeded by Anna-Maja Henriksson
Party political offices
Preceded by Pekka Haavisto	Chairperson of the Green League; 1995—1997	Succeeded by Satu Hassi
