= Anders Adlercreutz =

Finnish architect & politician (born 1970)

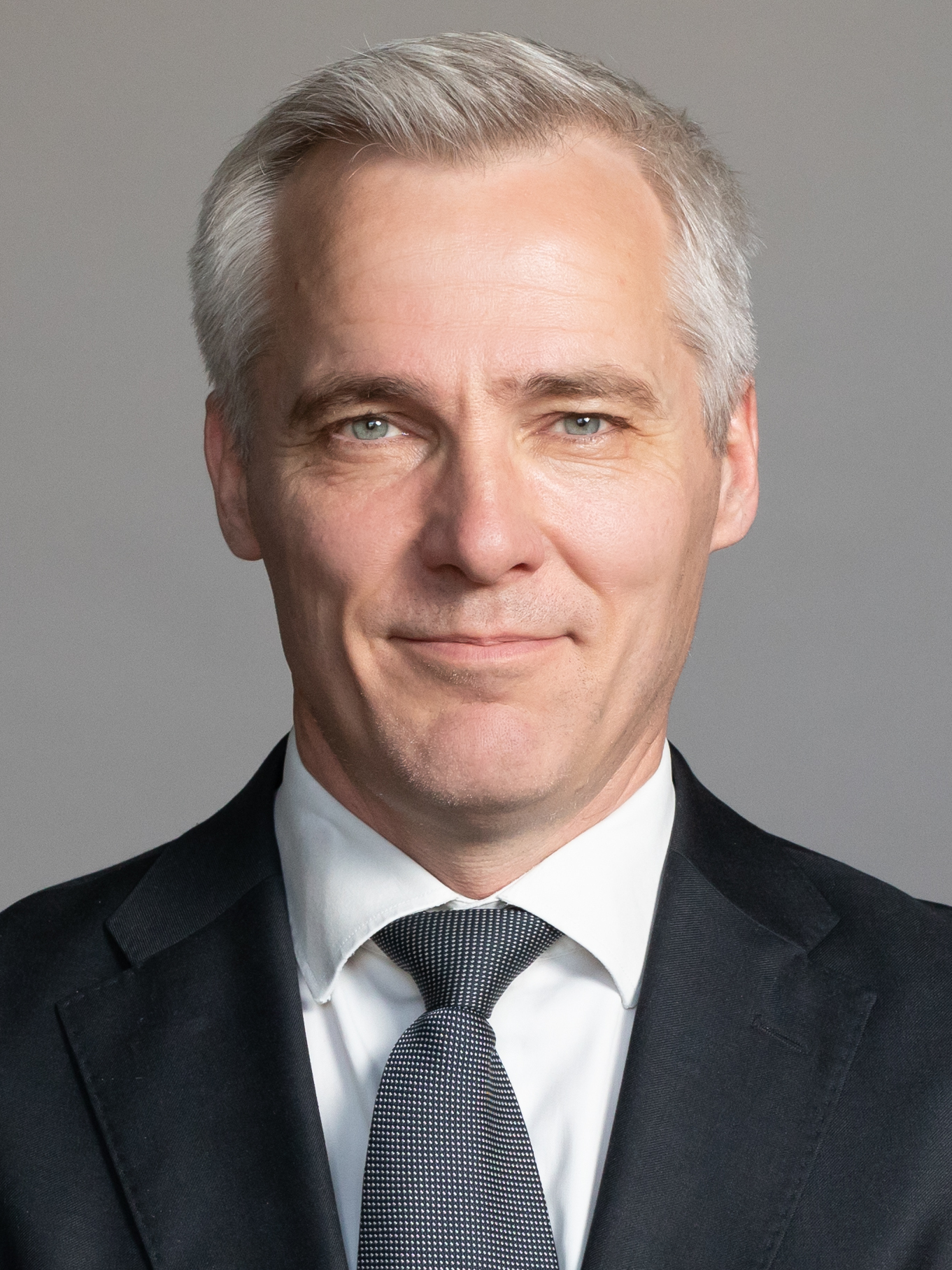
- Adlercreutz in 2023

Minister of Education
- Incumbent
- Assumed office 5 July 2024
- Prime Minister: Petteri Orpo
- Preceded by: Anna-Maja Henriksson

Minister of European Affairs and Ownership Steering
- In office 20 June 2023 – 5 July 2024
- Prime Minister: Petteri Orpo
- Preceded by: Tytti Tuppurainen
- Succeeded by: Joakim Strand

Member of the Finnish Parliament for Uusimaa
- Incumbent
- Assumed office 22 April 2015

Leader of the Swedish People's Party
- Incumbent
- Assumed office 16 June 2024
- Preceded by: Anna-Maja Henriksson

Personal details
- Born: Anders Erik Gunnar Adlercreutz; 26 April 1970 (age 56) Helsinki, Uusimaa Province, Finland
- Party: Swedish People's
- Spouse: Ia Adlercreutz
- Children: 5
- Education: Helsinki University of Technology
- Occupation: Politician; architect; entrepreneur
- Website: http://andersadlercreutz.fi/blog/?lang=en

Military service
- Allegiance: Finland
- Branch/service: Finnish Army
- Rank: Lieutenant

Anders Erik Gunnar Adlercreutz (born 26 April 1970) is a Finnish architect and politician who has served as Finland's Minister of Education since July 2024, having previously served as Minister of European Affairs and Ownership Steering. Adlercreutz has represented the Swedish People's Party of Finland in the Parliament of Finland since 2015, and has served as the party's chair since 2024.

== Early life and education ==
Adlercreutz was born on 26 April 1970. His family, the Adlercreutz family, are among the over 170 surviving noble families in Finland. His parents, Eric Adlercreutz and Gunnel Adlercreutz, are both architects.

He grew up in Kirkkonummi (Kyrkslätt). In 1987, Adlercreutz studied abroad in Portugal. He has lived in multiple European countries, including Spain, where he was residing as a student when he voted in favor of Finland's accession to the European Union. In 1999, he completed his degree in architecture at the Helsinki University of Technology.

== Architectural and military career ==
Adlercreutz is an architect by profession and was a partner at an architecture firm in Helsinki for over twenty years. He sold significant shares in the firm, known as Arkkitehtoimisto A-konsultit Oy, in 2023, allowing him to accrue over 322,744 euros in capital income that year.

As part of compulsory military service, Adlercreutz reached the rank of reserve lieutenant, and was part of the Uusimaa Brigade in Dragsvik.

== Political career ==
Prior to serving as an MP, he was a local councilor in Kirkkonummi, where he served alongside Finns Party chair Riikka Purra. He was dubbed the "Trudeau of Kirkkonummi" in reference to the Prime Minister of Canada in a 2017 interview.

He was elected to Parliament from the Uusimaa constituency in the 2015 election with 3,337 votes. In June 2016, Adlercreutz ran for the chairmanship of the Swedish People's Party, finishing second behind Anna-Maja Henriksson. He was subsequently elected as the vice-chairman of the party. He was re-elected vice-chairman in May 2018.

Adlercreutz was re-elected as an MP in 2019, garnering 9,425 votes. He was once again reelected as an MP in the 2023 election, winning 9,442 votes. He succeeded Henriksson as party chair in June 2024, defeating his only opponent, SPP parliamentary group chair Otto Andersson, in a 183-84 vote.

=== Ministerial tenure ===
In May 2022, Adlercreutz spoke in the parliamentary debate on Finland's accession to NATO and said that the Swedish People's Party and the Swedish parliamentary group supported Finland's application.

In June 2023, he was appointed Minister of European Affairs and Ownership Steering in the Orpo Cabinet. He stated that cultivating closer ties with Sweden would be a priority of his tenure.

On 5 July 2024, he succeeded Henriksson as Minister of Education. In this capacity, he has advocated in favor of exchange student programs, citing his own positive experience. Adlercreutz has advocated for banning the use of smartphones in Finnish schools.

== Personal life ==
Adlercreutz is a father of five. He reportedly is fluent in five languages.

Adlercreutz plays the piano and cello. In July 2023, in honor of Ukraine, he published a video where he played Oi u luzi chervona kalyna in cello in the corridors of the parliament house. The video hit over 250,000 views on Twitter and was noted in The New York Times.
