= Otto Andersson (Finnish politician) =

Finnish politician (born 1983)

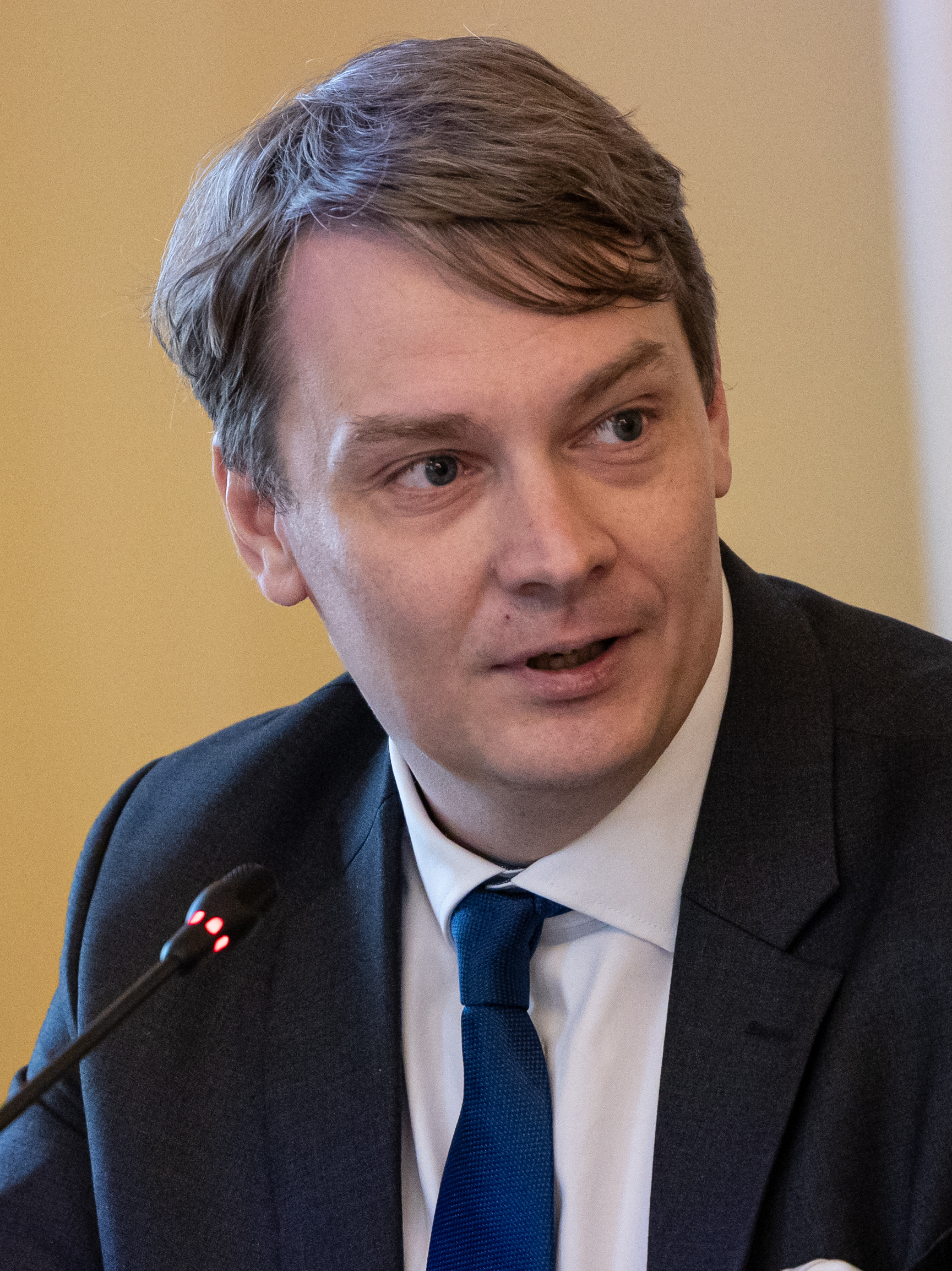

Member of the Parliament of Finland
- Incumbent
- Assumed office 2023

Personal details
- Party: Swedish People's Party of Finland
- Education: Åbo Akademi University; University of Helsinki

Otto Andersson (born 1983) is a Finnish politician and attorney. A member of the Swedish People's Party of Finland, he has served as a Member of Parliament since 2023. He is currently chairman of the party's parliamentary group.

== Education ==
Anderson studied at Åbo Akademi University and the University of Helsinki. During his time at university, he was part of Åbo Akademi's student union.

== Career ==
Andersson has served as chair of the Loviisa city council, and as a member of the board of the wellbeing service county (hyvinvointialue) of Itä-Uusimaa. He has also served as an assistant to Anna-Maja Henriksson.

Andersson was elected to parliament in the 2023 parliamentary election. In June 2023, he became chairman of the party's parliamentary group. Following Anna-Maja Henriksson's resignation as party chair in 2024, Andersson stood in the election to succeed her. He was defeated by Anders Adlercreutz, the vice-chair of the party, in a 183–84 vote.
