= Maaret Castrén =

Finnish politician

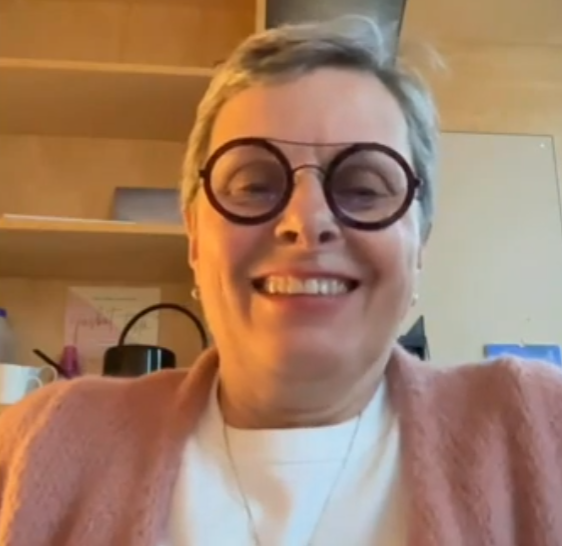
- In a 2025 interview

Member of the Parliament of Finland
- Incumbent
- Assumed office 16 July 2024
- Constituency: Helsinki

Personal details
- Born: 1959 (age 66–67) Helsinki
- Party: National Coalition Party

Maaret Kaarina Castrén (born 1959 in Helsinki) is a Finnish member of parliament for the National Coalition Party and member of the City Council of Helsinki. Castrén is a physician and professor of acute medicine. She works as a divisional director at the HUS-yhtymä.

== Political career ==
Castrén was elected as a substitute in the 2023 Finnish parliamentary election from the Helsinki constituency with 3,699 votes. She became a Member of Parliament in 2024, when representative Aura Salla was elected to the European Parliament. In Parliament, Castrén is a member of the Education Committee and the Social and Health Committee.

== See also ==
- List of members of the Parliament of Finland, 2023–2027
