= Juhani Markola =

Finnish singer (1942–2025)

Kari Juhani Markola (27 May 1942 – 30 August 2025) was a Finnish pop singer.

== Life and work ==
Markola was born on 27 May 1942. He was a tenor in terms of vocal range. In the early 1960s, he sang as a soloist in various dance bands in the Jyväskylä region. In the same year, he won the Finnish Championships in schlager singing in Helsinki and got a recording contract with Fazer's Decca label. In the 1970s, Markola was the vocalist of the band Herttuat, after which he recorded seven full-length albums under his own name between 1977 and 1987. His biggest hit is "Rakkauden aamu" (1976). The song is included on the album Rakkaudella, which sold almost 20,000 copies that entitle it to a gold record.

From the 1990s onwards, Markola also worked as a singing teacher, and he was granted an artist's pension in 2004. In the early 2000s, he worked for many years as a teacher in the Green Meadows of Kiuruvesi and as a member of the jury of the Toivo Kärki singing competition.

Markola died on 30 August 2025, at the age of 83.
