= Anna-Maja Henriksson =

Finnish politician (born 1964)

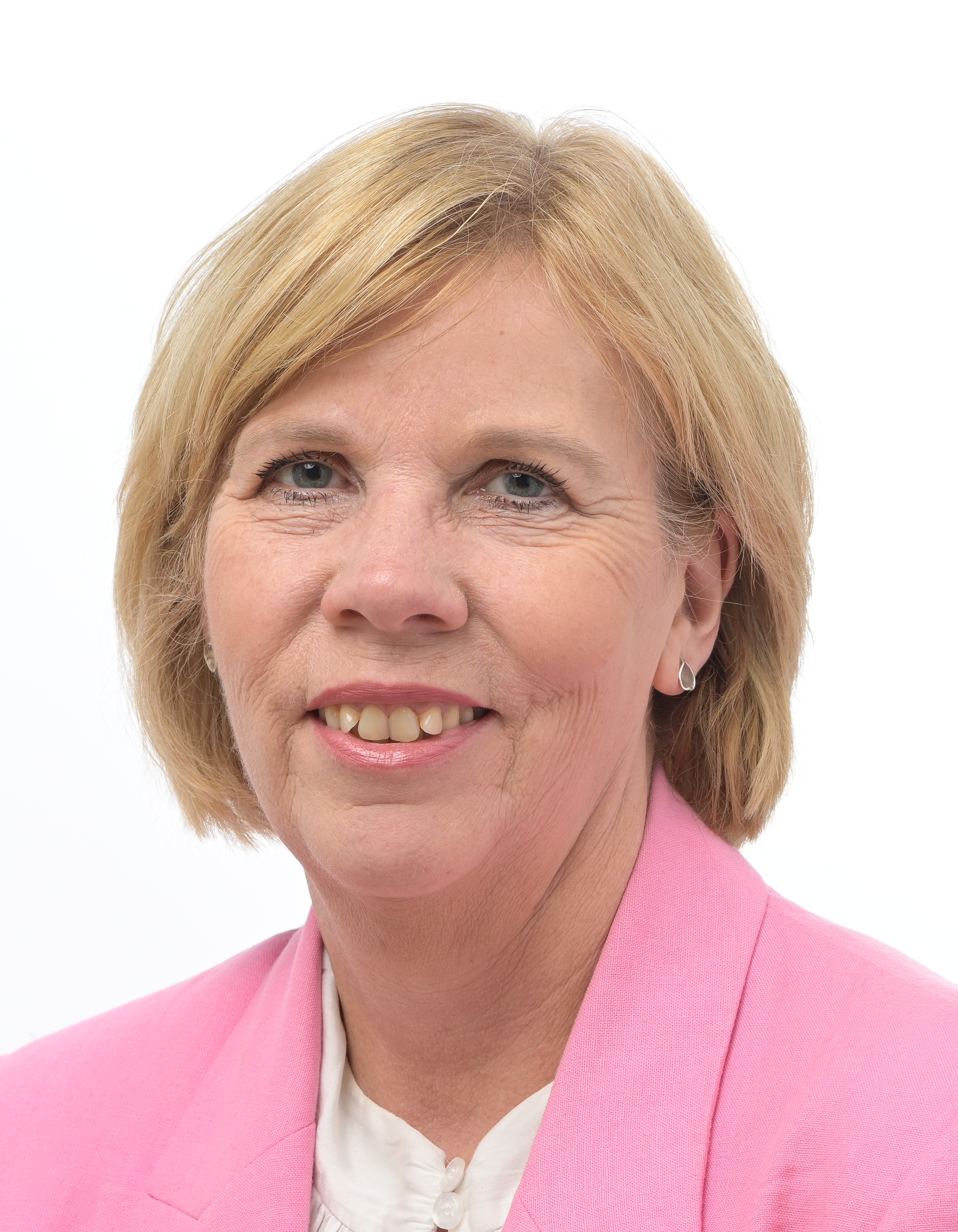
- Henriksson in 2024

Member of the European Parliament
- Incumbent
- Assumed office 16 July 2024
- Constituency: Finland

Minister of Education
- In office 20 June 2023 – 5 July 2024
- Prime Minister: Petteri Orpo
- Preceded by: Li Andersson
- Succeeded by: Anders Adlercreutz

Minister of Justice
- In office 6 June 2019 – 20 June 2023
- Prime Minister: Antti Rinne; Sanna Marin
- Preceded by: Antti Häkkänen
- Succeeded by: Leena Meri
- In office 22 June 2011 – 29 May 2015
- Prime Minister: Jyrki Katainen; Alexander Stubb
- Preceded by: Tuija Brax
- Succeeded by: Jari Lindström

Leader of the Swedish People's Party
- In office 12 June 2016 – 16 June 2024
- Preceded by: Carl Haglund
- Succeeded by: Anders Adlercreutz

Member of the Parliament of Finland
- In office 21 March 2007 – 15 July 2024
- Succeeded by: Christoffer Ingo

Personal details
- Born: Anna-Maja Kristina Forss; 7 January 1964 (age 62) Jakobstad, Ostrobothnia, Finland
- Party: Swedish People's
- Spouse: Janne Henriksson
- Children: 2
- Website: Official website

Anna-Maja Kristina Henriksson (née Forss; born 7 January 1964) is a Swedish-speaking Finnish politician. She has served as Finland's Minister of Justice, in Jyrki Katainen's cabinet and Alexander Stubb's cabinet from 2011 to 2015, Antti Rinne's cabinet from June to December 2019 and in Sanna Marin's cabinet from December 2019 to June 2023. Henriksson was recorded to have been the country's longest-serving Minister of Justice.

She has been a member of the Parliament of Finland from 2007–2024, vice-chairperson of the Swedish People's Party of Finland 2010–2016 and chairperson of the Swedish Parliamentary Group 2015–2016.

On 12 June 2016, Henriksson was elected as the leader of the Swedish People's Party of Finland becoming the first female leader for the party. She was re-elected as the party's chair in May 2021 without facing any opposition. She led the party in joining the right-wing coalition government led by Prime Minister Petteri Orpo's National Coalition Party and the Finns Party following the 2023 Finnish parliamentary election. On 27 February 2024, Henriksson announced that she would not seek another term as party leader at the party's conference in June and was later replaced by Anders Adlercreutz.

Henriksson is married to Janne Henriksson since 1991. The couple has two children.

== Awards and honours ==
- Finland: Order of the White Rose of Finland, Commander (2015)
- Sweden: Royal Order of the Polar Star, Commander Grand Cross (23 April 2024)

Political offices
Preceded by Tuija Brax	Minister of Justice; 2011–2015	Succeeded by Jari Lindström
Preceded by Antti Häkkänen	Minister of Justice; 2019–2023	Succeeded by Leena Meri
Preceded by Li Andersson	Minister of Education; 2023–2024	Succeeded by Anders Adlercreutz
Party political offices
Preceded by Carl Haglund	Leader of the Swedish People's Party of Finland; 2016–2024	Succeeded by Anders Adlercreutz
