= Helena Marttila =

Finnish politician

Member of the Parliament of Finland
- Incumbent
- Assumed office 14 September 2023
- Constituency: Uusimaa

Personal details
- Born: 1984 (age 41–42) Espoo
- Citizenship: Finland
- Party: SDP

Helena Marttila (born October 1984 in Espoo) is a Finnish member of parliament for the Social Democratic Party (SDP).

Marttila received 4,171 votes in the 2023 Finnish parliamentary election and was placed in the first reserve position. However, she immediately became an MP for the 2023–2027 parliamentary term, when Miapetra Kumpula-Natri continued in the European Parliament until the end of the parliamentary term. After the 2024 European Parliament elections, Marttila continued as an MP despite Kumpula-Natri returning to Parliament, when MP Maria Guzenina was granted a seat in the European Parliament.

Marttila is a social worker and holds a master's degree in political science. Her grandfather was Nestori Kaasalainen, a member of parliament and Minister of Agriculture.
