= Gunnel Adlercreutz =

Finnish architect

- Born: 27 July 1941 (age 83); Helsinki, Finland
- Occupation: Architect
- Spouse: Eric Adlercreutz

Gunnel Elisabeth Adlercreutz (née af Björkesten; born 27 July 1941 in Helsinki) is a Finnish architect. She is the daughter of the neurosurgeon Gunnar af Björkesten, and is married to the architect Eric Adlercreutz.

Gunnel Adlercreutz and her husband have run their own design practice since 1969. Between 1995 and 2006 she was chief ombudsman for the Building Information Foundation, and between 1992 and 1993 she chaired the Finnish Architects' Association.
