= Christoffer Ingo =

Finnish politician

Member of the Finnish Parliament for Vaasa
- Incumbent
- Assumed office 16 July 2024
- Preceded by: Anna-Maja Henriksson
- Parliamentary group: Swedish People's Party

Personal details
- Born: Christoffer Carl Gustav Ingo; 16 November 1994 (age 31) Korsholm
- Party: Swedish People's Party

Christoffer Carl Gustav Ingo (born 16 November 1994) is a Finland-Swedish politician currently serving as a member of the Parliament of Finland for the Vaasa electoral district, representing the Swedish People's Party of Finland (SFP). He was employed as an agricultural policy expert at the Swedish Agricultural Producers Central Confederation, SLC, an interest group for the Swedish-speaking farmers in Finland, from 2022 to 2024. He was the chair of Svensk Ungdom, the youth wing of his party, from 2017 to 2019, when he was succeeded in that capacity by Frida Sigfrids.

Ingo received 4,802 votes in the 2023 Finnish parliamentary election. The 2023 result was insufficient for him to be elected outright but when Anna-Maja Henriksson resigned her seat in the summer of 2024, in order to become a Member of the European Parliament, Ingo replaced her in the Finnish Parliament.
