= Roschier =

Law firm

- Headquarters: Finland
- No. of offices: 2
- No. of attorneys: 300
- No. of employees: 525
- Major practice areas: General practice
- Key people: Johan Sidklev (Managing Partner)
- Revenue: ▲€115,6 million (2018)
- Date founded: 1936
- Founder: Åke Roschier-Holmberg
- Company type: Limited liability partnership
- Website: roschier.com

Roschier is a Finnish founded Nordic law firm established in Helsinki in 1936. The company has offices in Finland and Sweden. The firm advises on international business law assignments and large-scale transactions. The firm's clients include domestic and international corporations, financial service and insurance institutions, investors, growth and other private companies with international operations, as well as governmental authorities.

== History ==
The firm was founded in Helsinki 1936 by Åke Roschier-Holmberg and soon took on a second partner, Arne Waselius.

Since its early days, the firm had a focus on business law. Roschier-Holmberg held the title of legal advisor to the British Embassy in Finland since the 1940s and was also President of the Finnish Bar Association between 1968 and 1972.

Up until the 1970s, Roschier-Holmberg had two partners and employed anywhere from one to three associate lawyers at any given time. By the mid 1990s, the firm had grown to approximately 40 lawyers and founded offices in Vaasa (Finland) and London (UK). The London office was closed down in 2002, and the Vaasa office in 2017. However, the real growth spurt of the firm took place in the 2000s.

In 2004, Roschier formed a Baltic alliance with Raidla & Partners (Estonia), Lejins, Torgans & Partners (Latvia) and Norcous & Partners (Lithuania). Originally, the alliance was called RoschierRaidla, but changed its name to the RR Alliance in 2010. Since 2012, the firms have cooperated with each other on a preferred firms basis. The former alliance's Baltic firms changed their names to Raidla, Lejins & Norcous in 2008. In 2015, these firms split up to form two new alliances: Ellex and Cobalt.

In 2005, Roschier established an office in Stockholm. The office was first headed by Axel Calissendorff, former President of the Swedish Bar Association.

In 2016 Roschier celebrated its 80th anniversary. In 2015 Roschier Stockholm office celebrated its 10th anniversary.

== Size and impact ==
Roschier is the biggest law firm in Finland and among the largest in Sweden. It is also among the 50 largest law firms in Europe, attracting international talents. .

Roschier has continuously been top-ranked in Finland in an independent Law Firm Review market survey conducted by TNS Sifo Prospera, and has also received recognition as one of the top firms in Prospera's corresponding review in Sweden. The review has been conducted in Finland since 2008, and in Sweden since 2004. Roschier is consistently recognized as a leader by international ranking institutions and legal directories, and ranked highly for its services within different legal areas.

Roschier is also the Finnish member of Lex Mundi.
