= Sari Multala =

Finnish sailor and politician

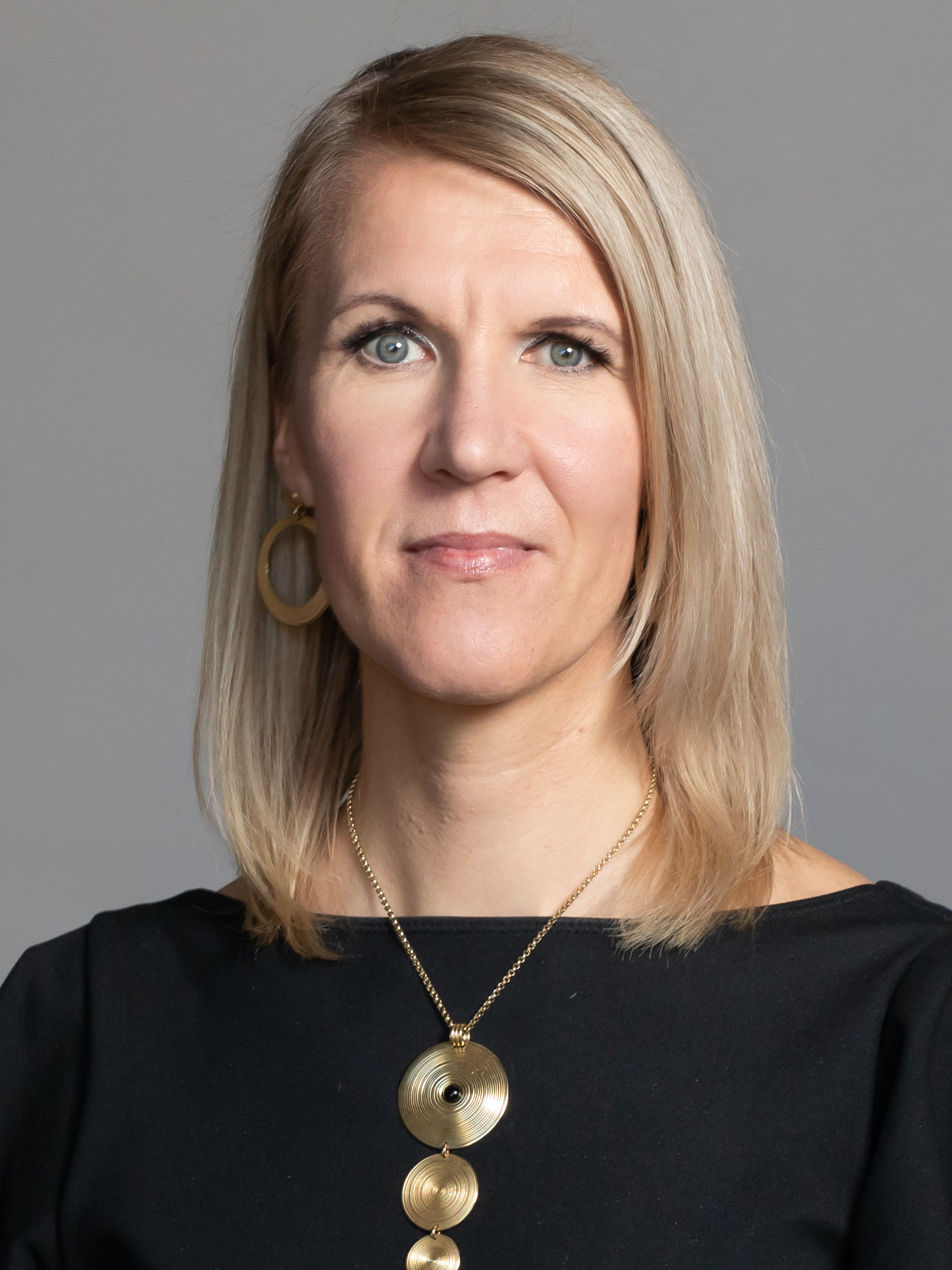
- Multala in 2023

Minister of the Environment and Climate Change
- Incumbent
- Assumed office 24 January 2025
- Prime Minister: Petteri Orpo
- Preceded by: Kai Mykkänen

Member of Parliament for Uusimaa
- Incumbent
- Assumed office 22 April 2015

Minister of Science and Culture
- In office 20 June 2023 – 24 January 2025
- Prime Minister: Petteri Orpo
- Preceded by: Petri Honkonen
- Succeeded by: Mari-Leena Talvitie

Personal details
- Born: 5 July 1978 (age 48) Helsinki, Uusimaa, Finland
- Party: National Coalition Party
- Website: sarimultala.fi

Sari Multala
Sailing career
- Sport: Sailing
Medal record
Sailing
Representing Finland
World Championships
Gold medal – first place	2009 Karatsu	Laser Radial
Gold medal – first place	2010 Largs	Laser Radial
Silver medal – second place	2007 Cascais	Laser Radial
Bronze medal – third place	2012 Boltenhagen	Laser Radial

Sari Multala (born 5 July 1978) is a Finnish Olympic sailor, politician, member of Parliament of Finland and cabinet minister.

== Sailing ==
She went on to compete in the 2000 Olympic Sailing Competition and 2004 Olympic Sailing Competition finishing fifth in the Women's Singlehanded Class the Europe (dinghy). At the 2012 Summer Olympics, she competed in the women's laser radial dinghy class where she finished 7th.

She is also a two time world champion in the laser radial class, and has also won a silver and bronze in the same event.

She was shortlisted in 2002 by the International Sailing Federation for the ISAF World Sailor of the Year Awards.

== Politics ==
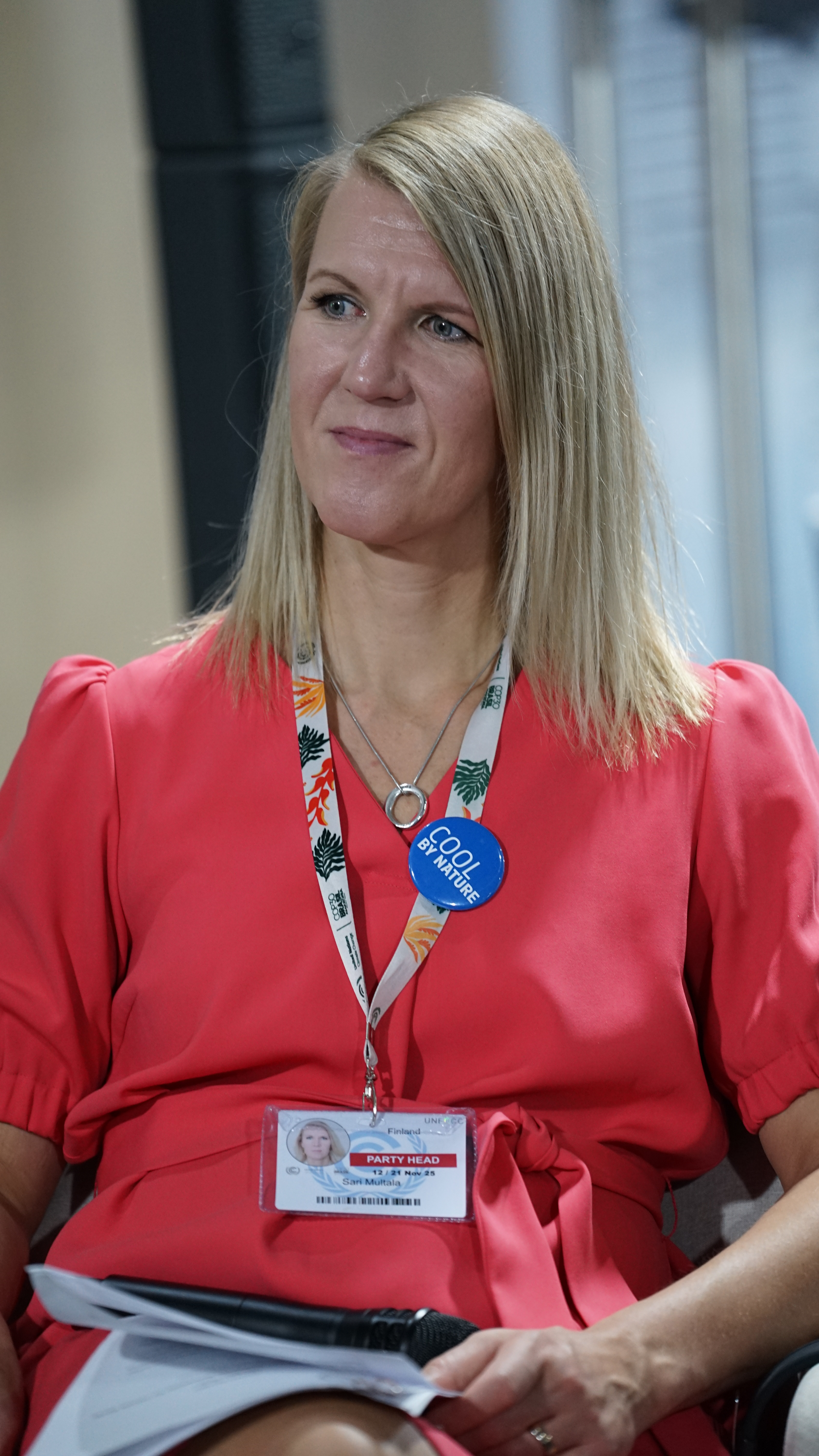
Multala at COP30 in 2025

Multala was elected to Vantaa City Council in 2012 representing National Coalition Party. She was elected to the Parliament of Finland for the first time in the 2015 parliamentary elections and was re-elected in 2019. Since 2017, she has served as Chair of City Board in Vantaa.

In June 2023, she was appointed Minister of Science and Culture in the Orpo Cabinet. On 24 January 2025 she was appointed Minister of the Environment and Climate Change, replacing Kai Mykkänen who was elected Mayor of Espoo in October 2024. She immediately received criticism for her appointment from the Green League for failing to address climate challenges when asked about logging.

== Sports committees ==
In 2020 she was nominated by the Finnish Sailing and Boating Association (SPV) for the position of President of the Finnish Olympic Committee and to the Board of Directors of the Olympic Committee. She had previously served as chairman of the SPV from 2013 to 2018. She ended up receiving 10 votes in the presidential election.

== Significant results ==
- 5th 2000 Olympic Sailing Competition
- 1st 2001 Europe World Championships, Vilamoura, POR
- 5th 2004 Olympic Sailing Competition
- 2nd 2007 Laser Radial Women World Championship, Cascais, POR
- 1st 2009 Laser Radial Women World Championship, Karatsu, JPN
- 1st 2010 Laser Radial Women World Championship, Largs, GBR
- 7th 2012 Olympic Sailing Competition
- 3rd 2012 Laser Radial Women World Championship, Boltenhagen, GER
