= Pia Lohikoski =

Finnish politician

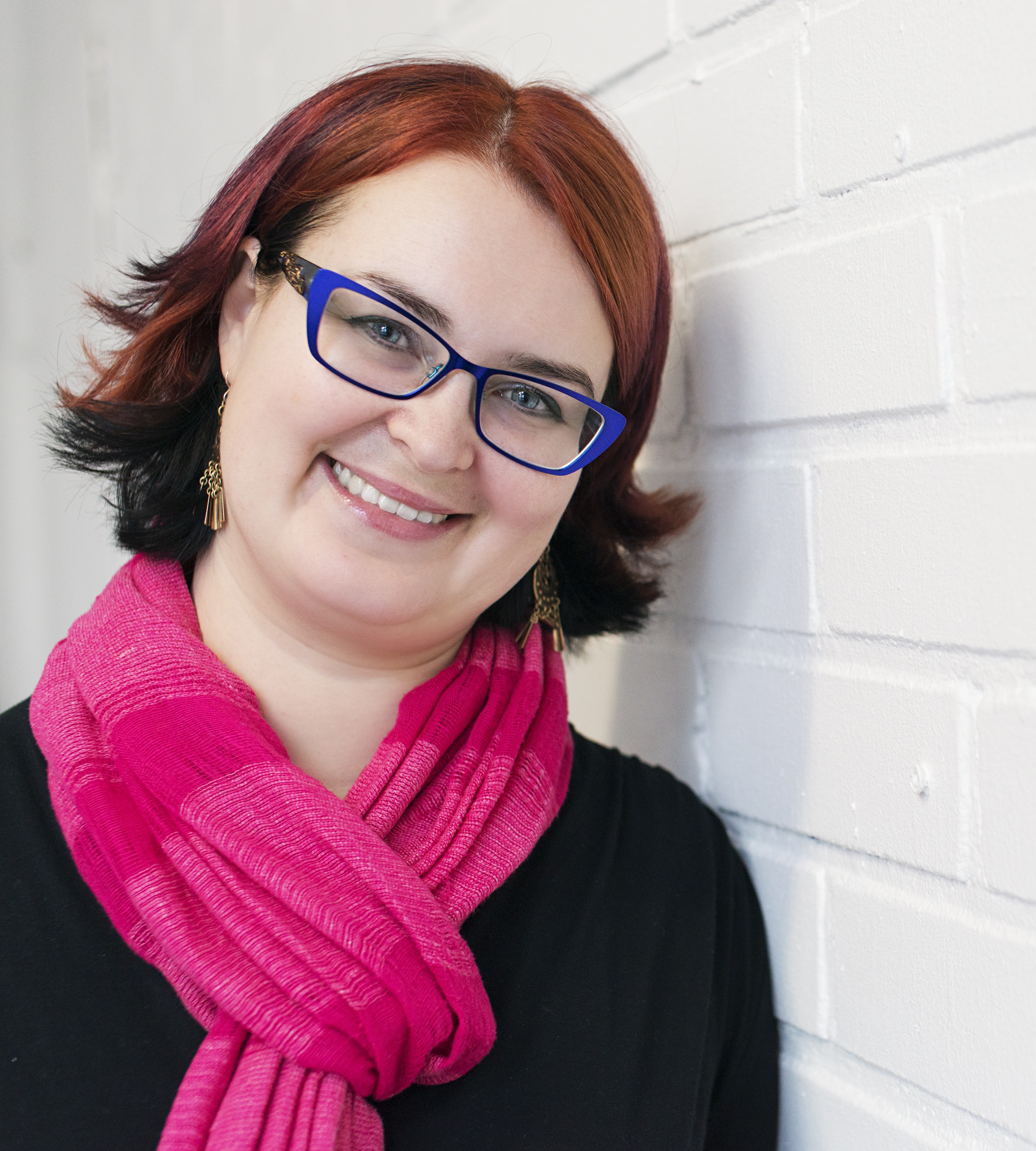

Member of the Finnish Parliament for Uusimaa
- In office 17 April 2019 – 4 April 2023
- Parliamentary group: Left Alliance
- Incumbent
- Assumed office 16 July 2024
- Parliamentary group: Left Alliance

Personal details
- Born: 5 September 1977 (age 48)
- Party: Left Alliance

Pia Marjaana Lohikoski is a Finnish politician currently serving in the Parliament of Finland for the Left Alliance at the Uusimaa constituency. She was first elected to office in 2019.
