= Klaus Wirzenius =

Finnish musician (1987–2025)

Klaus-Erik Wilhelm Wirzenius (2 September 1987 – 13 August 2025) was a Finnish bassist, guitarist and singer. He played in the bands Anthriel, Bullet Ride, Manzana and Dave L. B. Inventive. He also played in the lineups of Rainbow singers Joe Lynn Turner, Graham Bonnet and Doogie White on their solo tours in Finland. His recording history includes Pate Mustajärvi, Dave Lindholm B. Inventive, Manzana, Anthriel and Jani Wickholm.

== Background ==
Wirzenius was born in Tampere on 2 September 1987. He drowned accidentally in Tampere, while swimming in Massunlahti Bay in Lake Näsijärvi on 13 August 2025. He was 37.
