= Eric Adlercreutz =

Finnish architect (born 1935)

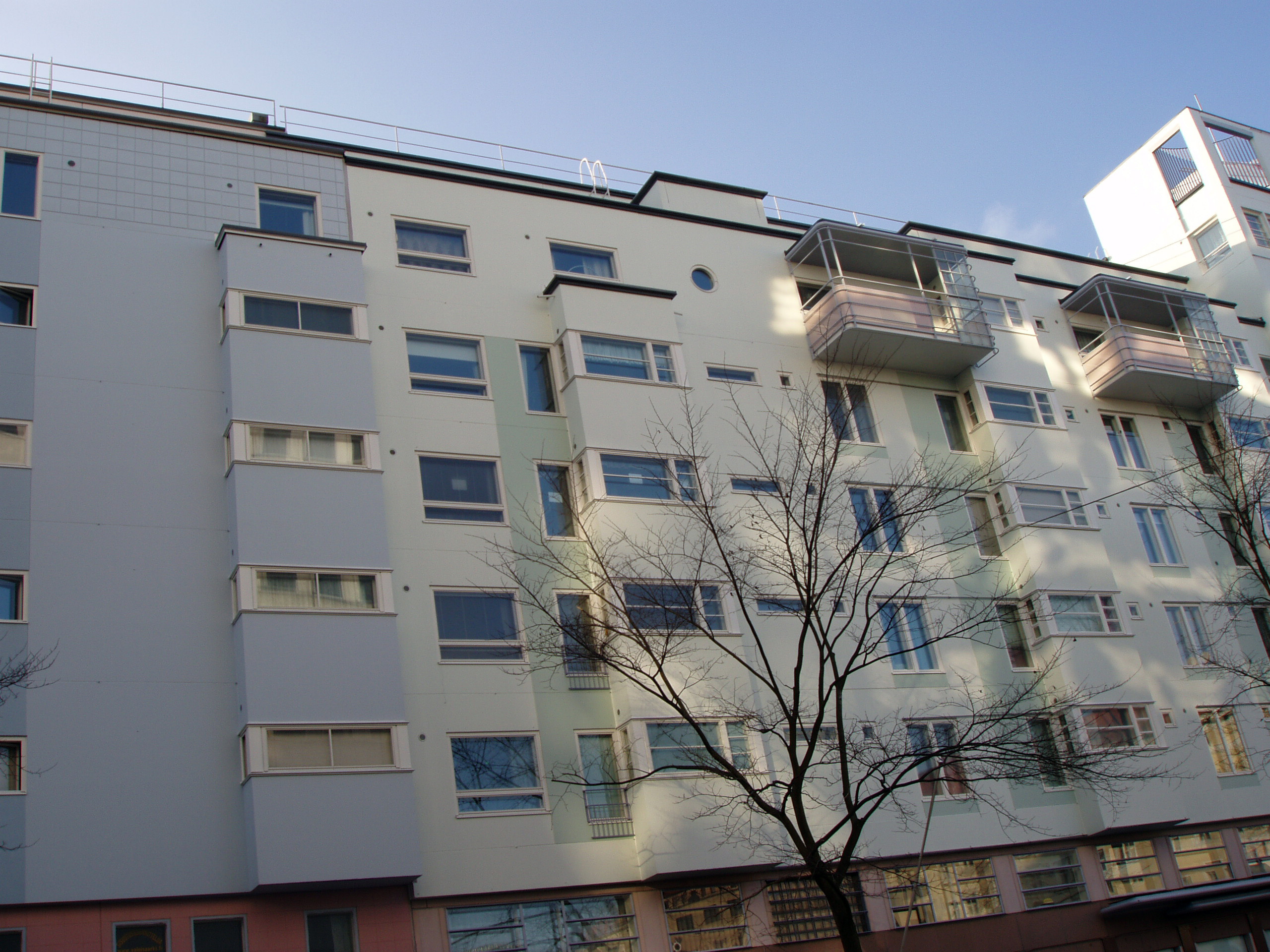
Kamppi housing area, Helsinki, 1984–1989.

Eric Adlercreutz (born 1935) is a Finnish architect. He is the founder of the Helsinki-based architecture firm A-Konsultit, founded in 1962 alongside his wife Gunnel Adlercreutz.

== Early life and education ==
Aldercreutz was born in 1935 in Helsinki. Adlercreutz studied architecture at the Helsinki University of Technology (where he later taught) from 1966 to 1970. He later studied at the University of California, Berkeley in the United States from 1968 to 1969.

== Career ==
Adlercreutz was a former employee of Alvar Aalto, a famous Finnish architect. Adlercreutz co-founded A-Konsultit, an architecture firm, with his wife Gunnel Adlercreutz in 1962.

Buildings designed by A-Konsultit are said to be influenced by Alvar Aalto's style, as well as Adlercreutz's own interest in town planning and housing (especially social housing and community building). The firm has also specialized in restoration efforts.

Adlercreutz won over twenty national architecture competitions over the duration of his career. He later became chairman of the Finnish Committee for the Restoration of Viipuri Library, one of Aalto's most famous works.

== A selection of buildings designed by A-Konsultit ==
- Kamppi housing area and senior citizen service center, Helsinki, 1984–1989.
- Leskenenlehti school and daycare center, Helsinki, 2002–2003.
- Svenska Handelshögskolan, University of Helsinki, restoration, 1983.
- Kivikko service center, health care and senior citizen's center, 1997.
- Lehtovuori housing area, Konala, Helsinki, 2002.
