= Jouko Purontakanen =

Finnish sports executive (1948–2026)

Jouko Purontakanen (9 March 1948 – 3 June 2026) was a Finnish sports executive.

== Life and career ==
Purontakanen was born in Pieksämäki on 9 March 1948. He held a number of titles, including the executive director of the Finnish Orienteering Federation between 1976 and 1985, managing director of the Finnish Athletics Federation between 1987 and 1992.

He was the Secretary General of the Finnish Olympic Committee between 1996 and 2012.

Purontakanen died in Porvoo on 3 June 2026, at the age of 78.
