= Aura Salla =

Finnish politician

Aura Salla MEP
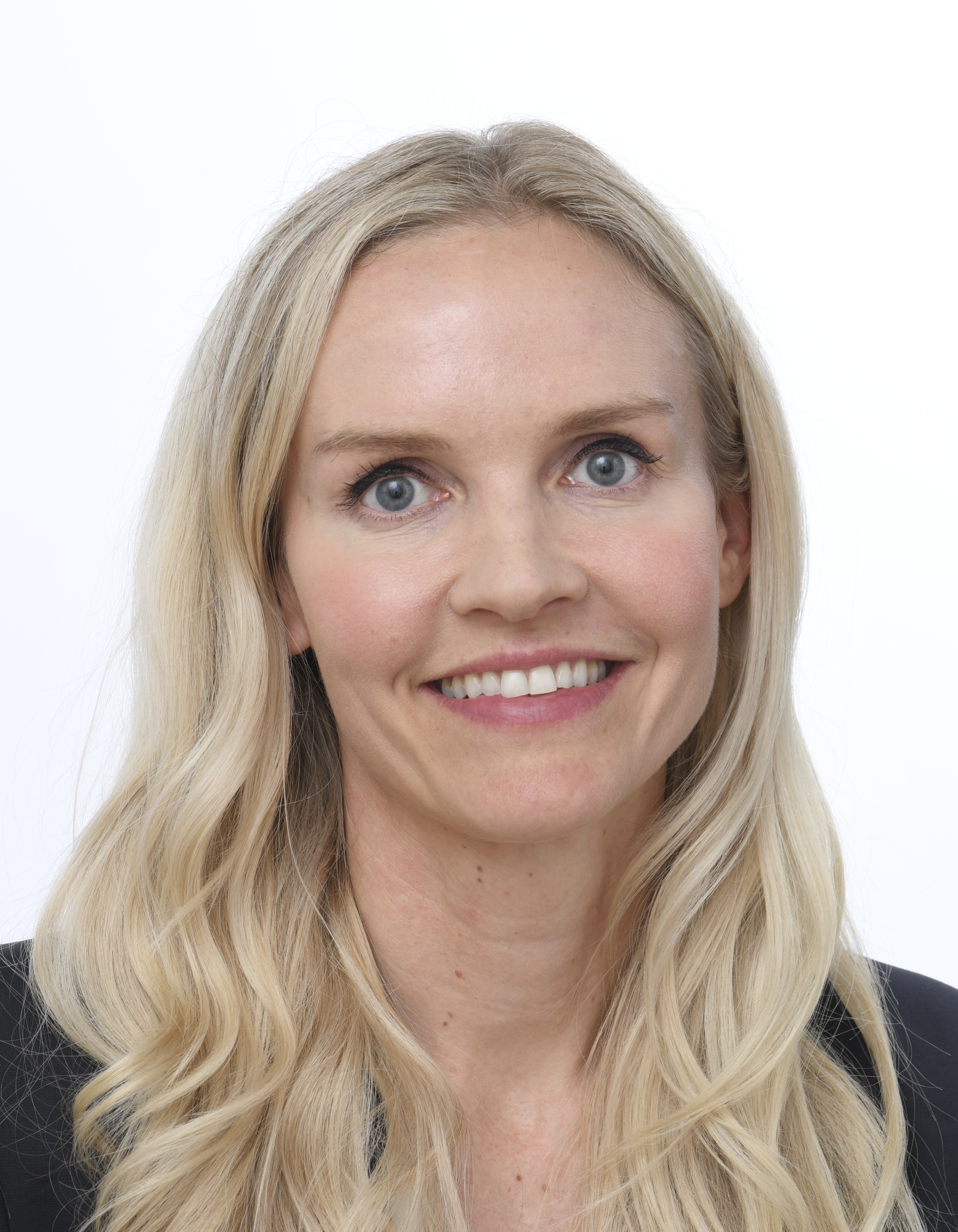
- Salla in 2024

Member of the European Parliament
- Incumbent
- Assumed office 16 July 2024
- Constituency: Finland

Member of the Finnish Parliament
- In office 5 April 2023 – 16 July 2024
- Succeeded by: Maaret Castrén
- Constituency: Helsinki

Personal details
- Born: 13 June 1984 (age 42) Lappeenranta, Finland
- Party: National Coalition Party
- Education: PhD in political science
- Alma mater: University of Turku
- Occupation: Public Policy Director and Head of EU Affairs, Meta
- Website: Official website

Military service
- Allegiance: Finland
- Branch/service: Finnish Air Force
- Rank: Sergeant

Aura Maria Salla (born 13 June 1984) is a Finnish politician and a Member of the European Parliament.

== Early life ==
Salla obtained a master's degree in political science from the University of Turku in 2011, followed by a PhD in 2021; the title of her thesis was The Euro Crisis 2010–2014: The Changing Role of the European Commission.

Before her studies, Salla completed her voluntary national military service in the Finnish Air Force, discharged at the rank of sergeant.

== Career ==
Salla ran unsuccessfully in the 2014 and 2019 European Parliament election, instead ending up as an advisor, first in Commissioner Jyrki Katainen's cabinet (2014–2016), followed by a similar role in the strategy unit of Commission President Jean-Claude Juncker (2016–2020).

From there she moved into business, taking up the post of Public Policy Director and Head of EU Affairs at Meta in 2020, where she was described by Politico as "Zuckerberg’s woman in Brussels". She remained in that role for three years leading up to her election to the Finnish Parliament in April 2023, representing the Helsinki constituency for the National Coalition Party. In addition to her regular role as a Member of Parliament, Salla was a member of the Finnish delegations to the Nordic Council and the Council of Europe.

In July 2024, Salla was elected to the 10th European Parliament, representing Finland for the National Coalition Party, as part of the EPP group.

In February 2026, the EPP group nominated Salla as one of the two rapporteurs for the Digital Omnibus legislative package which aims to "simplify" EU tech rules, including the General Data Protection Regulation and the ePrivacy Directive. The appointment of the former Meta chief lobbyist in the role drew criticism from several NGOs and fellow MEPs due to possible conflicts of interest.

== Views ==
In November 2025, Salla expressed her view that she would support abolishing the European Parliament and transferring its legislative powers to the Council in order to cut down "EU bureaucracy".

== Personal life ==
Salla is married to diplomat Turo Mattila, whom she met professionally in Brussels; the couple have two children. Her hobbies include pilates, going to the gym, and pesäpallo.
