= Jessi Jokelainen =

Finnish politician (born 1996)

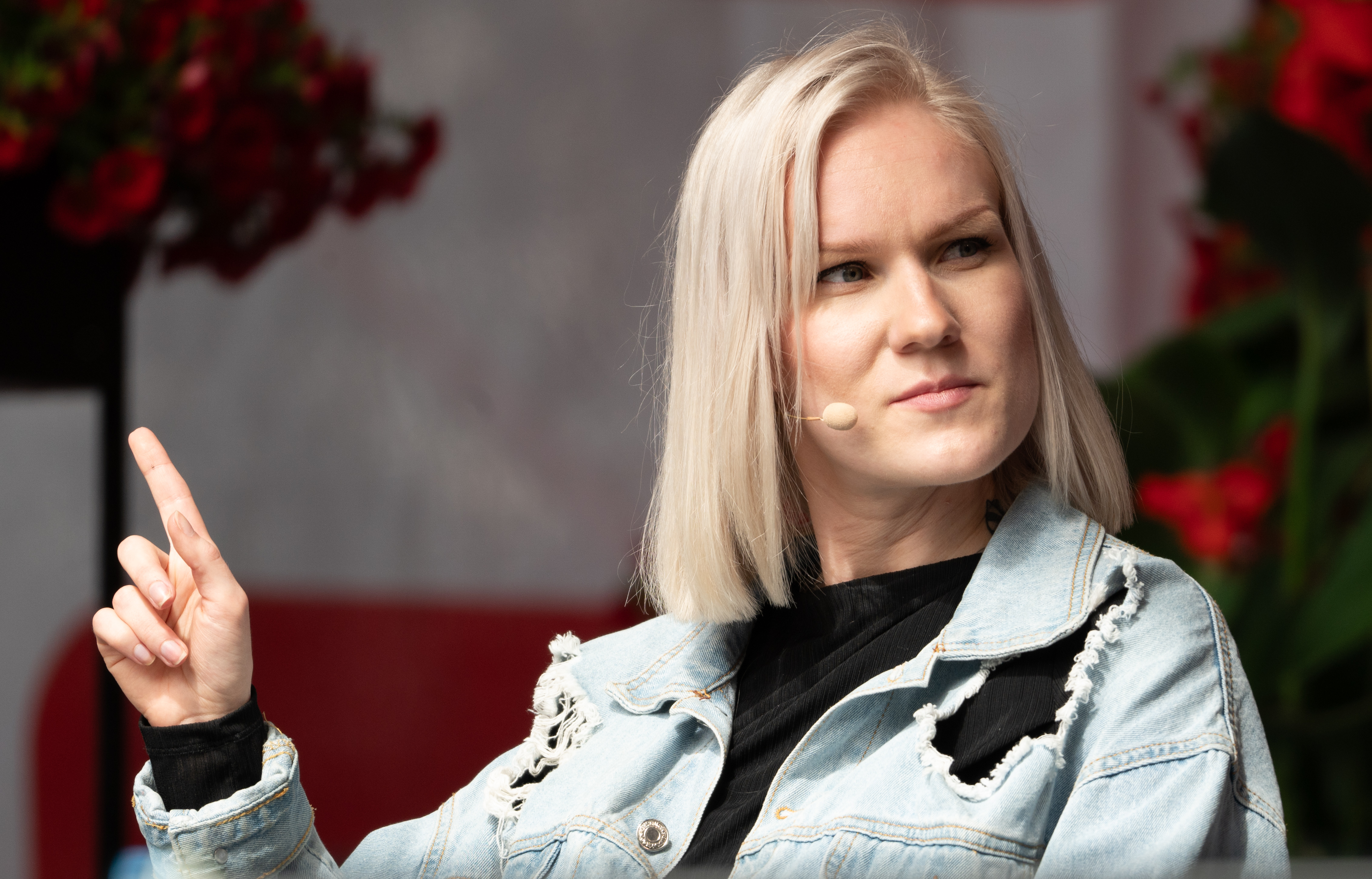

Member of the Parliament of Finland
- Incumbent
- Assumed office 16 July 2024
- Preceded by: Merja Kyllönen
- Constituency: Oulu

Personal details
- Born: 1996 (age 29–30)
- Party: Left Alliance

Jessi Maaria Jokelainen (born 1996) is a Finnish politician serving as a member of the Parliament of Finland since 2024. She has been a municipal councillor of Oulu since 2021.
