= Johannes Koskinen =

Finnish politician (born 1954)

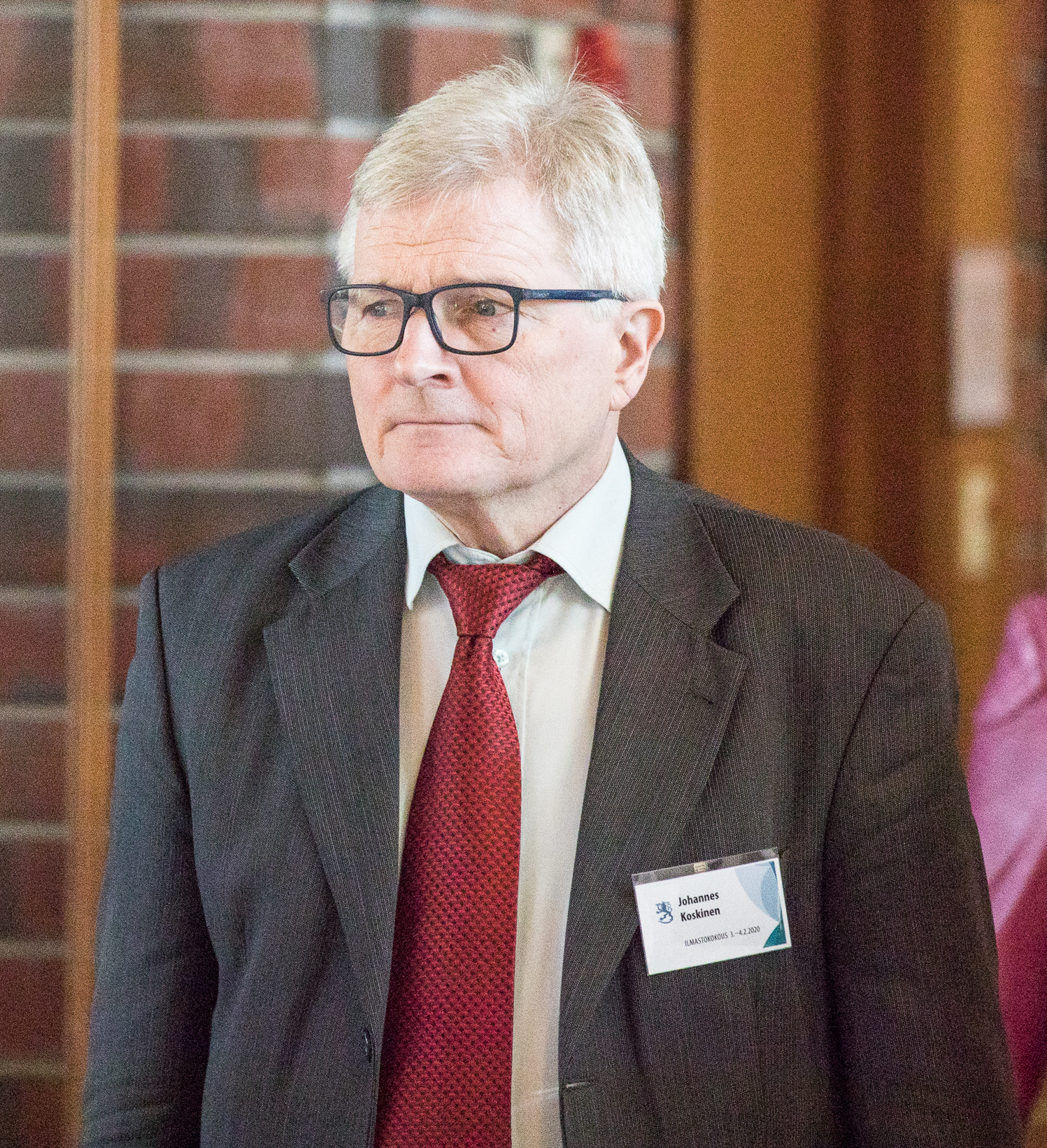
- The government and the parliamentary groups of the governing parties met for a joint climate conference in Vuosaari, Helsinki.

Minister of Justice
- In office 15 April 1999 – 22 September 2005
- Prime Minister: Paavo Lipponen; Anneli Jäätteenmäki; Matti Vanhanen
- Preceded by: Jussi Järventaus
- Succeeded by: Leena Luhtanen

Personal details
- Born: 10 December 1954 (age 71) Janakkala, Finland
- Party: Social Democratic Party

Hannu Erkki Johannes Koskinen (born 10 December 1954) is a Finnish politician and a lawyer as profession. He is a member of the Social Democratic Party of Finland (SDP).

Koskinen was born in Janakkala. He has been a member of the Parliament of Finland from the Häme electoral district since 1991 and served as the minister of justice in two Lipponen cabinets, Jäätteenmäki cabinet and first Vanhanen cabinet from April 1999 to March 2005. He was replaced as minister of justice by Leena Luhtanen in a cabinet reshuffle.

He has been a member of Hämeenlinna city council 1989–2004 and again since 2009.

He served one of the deputy speakers of the Parliament of Finland.

Political offices
Preceded by Jussi Järventaus	Minister of Justice; 1999–2005	Succeeded by Leena Luhtanen
