= Jarno Limnell =

Finnish politician

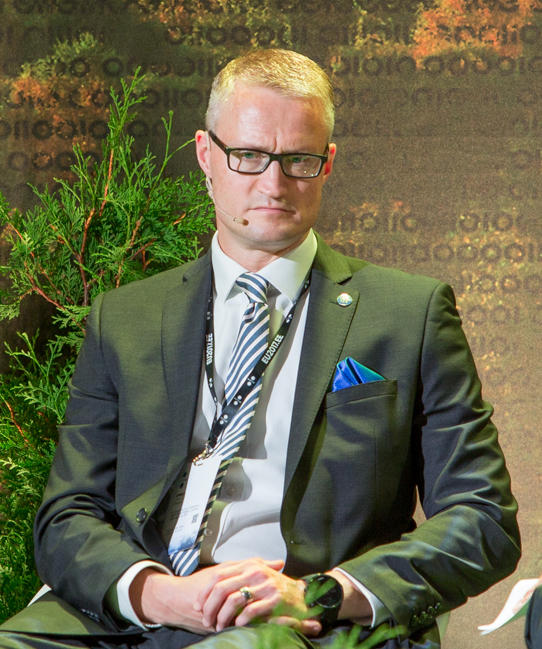
- Limnell in 2017.

Member of the Finnish Parliament for Uusimaa
- Incumbent
- Assumed office 5 April 2023
- Parliamentary group: National Coalition Party

Personal details
- Born: 1973 (age 52–53)
- Party: National Coalition Party
- Occupation: Professor of practice
- Website: https://jarnolimnell.fi/

Jarno Ilmari Limnell (born 1973) is a Finnish politician currently serving in the Parliament of Finland representing the National Coalition Party. He was elected in the 2023 Finnish parliamentary election from the Uusimaa constituency with 13,917 votes.

Limnell has a postgraduate degree in military science and works as professor of practice in Aalto University.
