= Arvo Siikamäki =

Finnish sculptor (1943–2026)

Arvo Siikamäki (21 May 1943 – 20 January 2026) was a Finnish sculptor.

== Life and work ==
Siikamäki was born on 21 May 1943. He used native wood, stone and bronze and created harmonious figures with an emphasis on nature. He received the Pro Finlandia medal in 2007. Siikamäki died on 20 January 2026, at the age of 82.
