= Johannes Yrttiaho =

Finnish politician

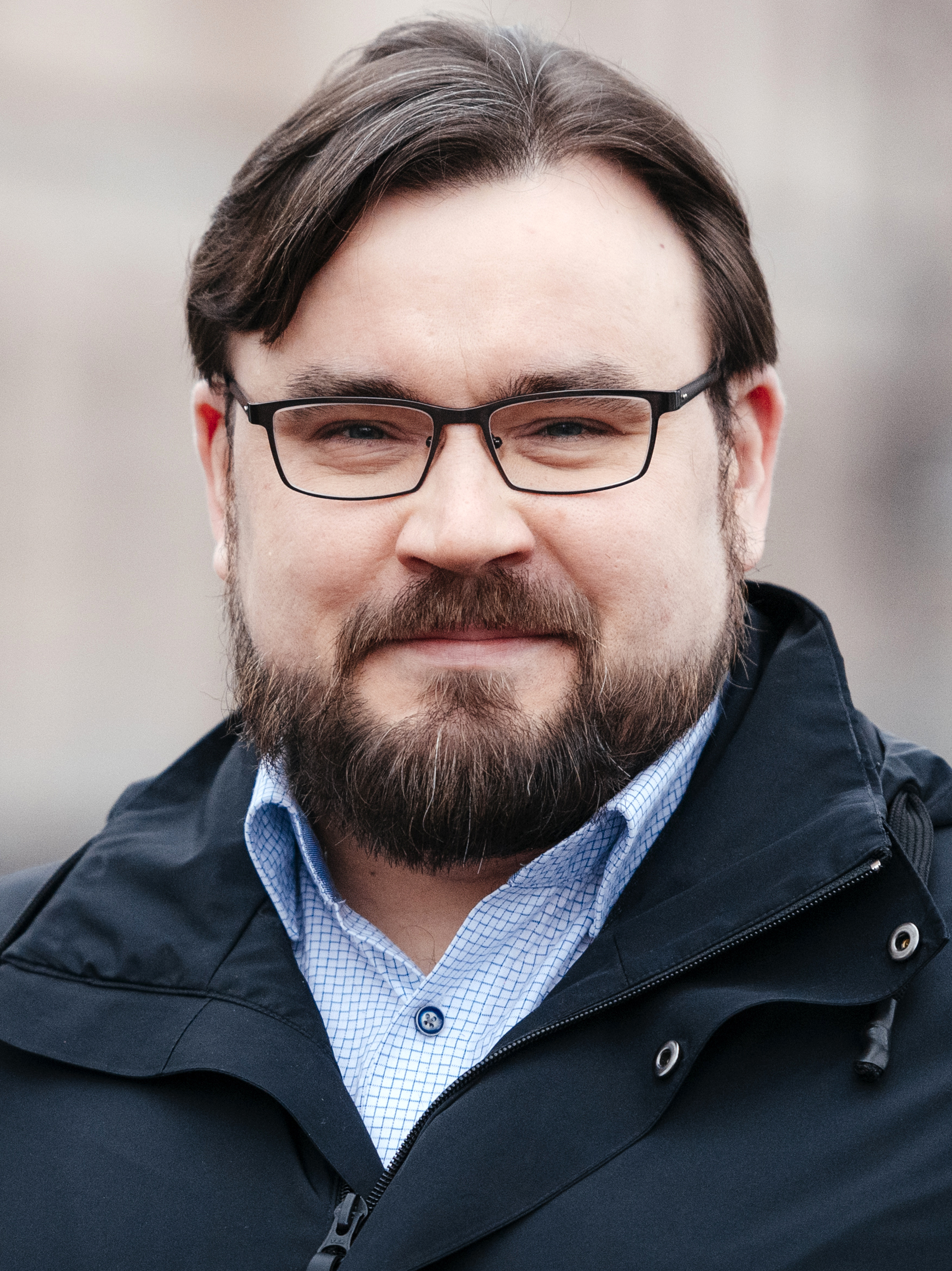
- Johannes Yrttiaho in 2020

Member of the Finnish Parliament for Varsinais-Suomi
- In office 14 April 2019 – 4 April 2023

Personal details
- Born: 22 January 1980 (age 46) Turku
- Party: Left Alliance
- Website: https://johannesyrttiaho.fi/

Johannes Yrttiaho (born in Turku 22 January 1980) is a Finnish politician who served in the Parliament of Finland for the Left Alliance at the Varsinais-Suomi district.

== Electoral history ==
=== Municipal elections ===
Year	Municipality	Votes	Result
2008	Turku	436	Elected
2012	Turku	700	Elected
2017	Turku	1 119	Elected
2021	Turku	731	Elected

=== Parliamentary elections ===
Year	Constituency	Votes	Result
2015	Varsinais-Suomi	2 970	Not elected
2019	Varsinais-Suomi	2 636	Elected
2023	Varsinais-Suomi	1 630	Not elected

=== County elections ===
Year	Constituency	Votes	Result
2022	Finland Proper	1 283	Elected
