= Joakim Strand =

Finnish politician

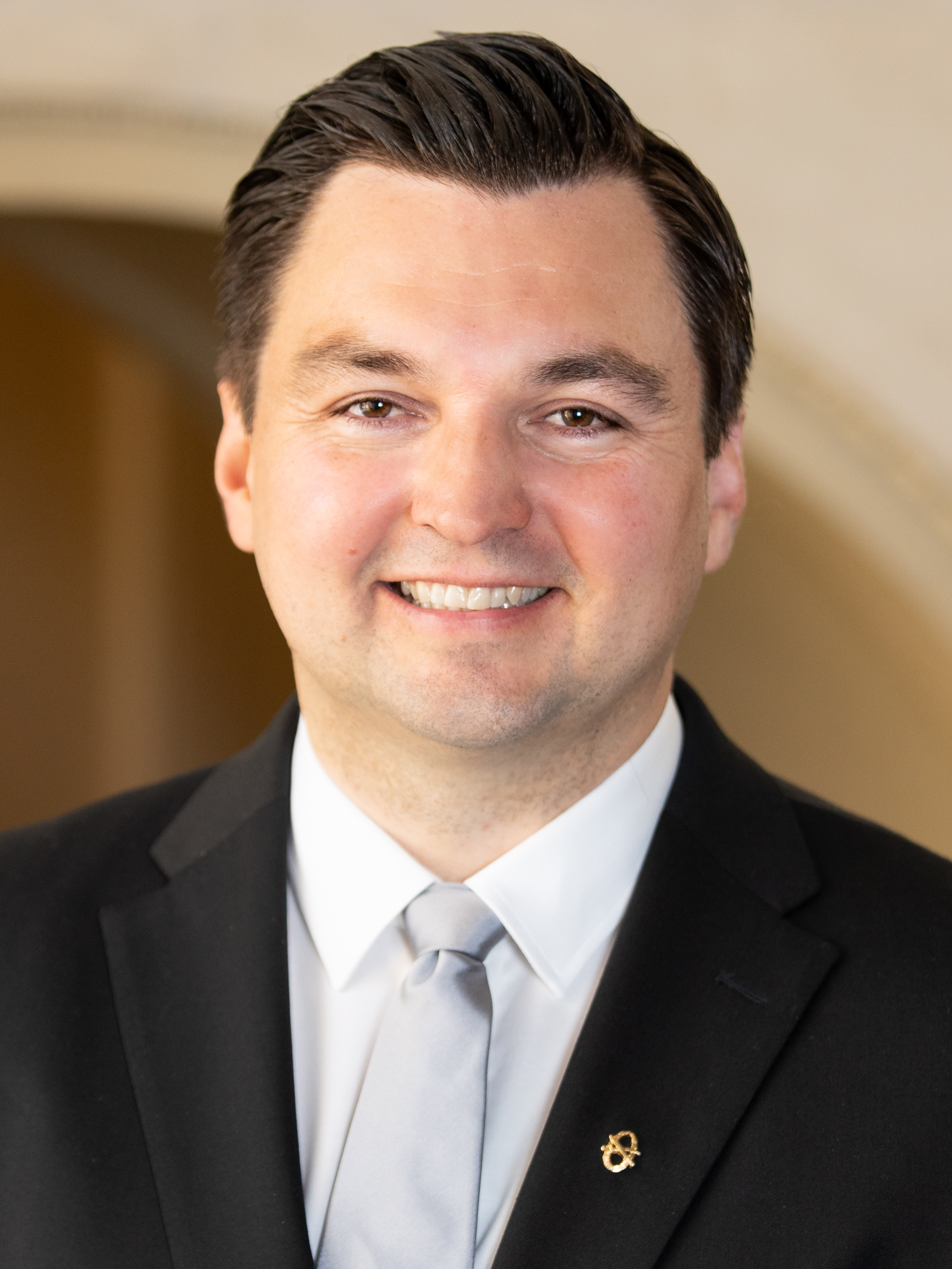
- Strand in 2024

Minister of European Affairs and Ownership Steering
- Incumbent
- Assumed office 5 July 2024
- Prime Minister: Petteri Orpo
- Preceded by: Anders Adlercreutz

Member of Parliament for Vaasa
- Incumbent
- Assumed office 22 April 2015

Personal details
- Born: 2 August 1982 (age 43) Turku, Southwest Finland, Finland
- Party: Swedish People's Party
- Spouse: Henriikka Strand

Jan Joakim Strand (born 2 August 1982 in Turku) is a Finnish politician currently serving in the Parliament of Finland for the Swedish People's Party of Finland representing the Vaasa constituency since 2015. On 5 July 2024 he replace Anders Adlercreutz as Minister of European Affairs and Ownership Steering.
