= Eemeli Peltonen =

Finnish politician (1994–2025)

Member of the Finnish Parliament
- In office 5 April 2023 – 19 August 2025
- Constituency: Uusimaa

Personal details
- Born: 15 September 1994 Kerava, Finland
- Died: 19 August 2025 (aged 30) Helsinki, Finland
- Party: SDP
- Education: University of Helsinki

Lasse Eemeli Heikinpoika Peltonen (15 September 1994 – 19 August 2025) was a Finnish politician who served as a Member of Parliament.

== Life and career ==
Peltonen was born in Kerava on 15 September 1994. Peltonen served as a city councillor in Järvenpää since 2013 and as the chairman of the city council from 2017 to 2021. According to the Kuntalehti magazine, during the term of office from 2017 to 2021, Peltonen was the youngest chairman of the council in Finland. Following the municipal elections in June 2021, Peltonen served as the chairman of the Järvenpää city board. In the regional elections in 2022, Peltonen was elected to the council of the Central Uusimaa Welfare Area and served as the chairman of the welfare area's council from spring 2022 to 2025.

From 2013 to 2017, Peltonen served as the chairman of the Järvenpää Education and Leisure Committee. In the municipal elections of 2012, as a first-time candidate, Peltonen received 153 votes, becoming the fifth-most-popular candidate in his party. In the municipal elections of spring 2017, Peltonen garnered 390 votes, becoming the top vote-getter for his party and the fifth-most-popular candidate in the entire city. In the June 2021 municipal elections, Peltonen received 909 votes and was once again the candidate who received the most votes in his party.

Peltonen was affiliated with the Social Democratic Party (SDP). He was a member of the SDP's party council since 2014. He served as the chairman of the Uusimaa SDP Youth from 2014 to 2015 and as the first vice chairman of the SDP Youth from 2016 to 2018. Peltonen worked as a summer editor and contributor for the SDP party newspaper Demokraatti from 2014 to 2015, as a conscript editor for the Finnish Defense Forces' Ruotuväki magazine (2013–2014), and as the editor-in-chief of the SDP Youth's Lippu magazine (2012–2014). Between 2015 and 2021, Peltonen worked as an assistant to Members of Parliament Mika Kari and Joona Räsänen in the Social Democratic parliamentary group. In spring 2021, Peltonen transitioned to working as a communications specialist at the Service Union United (PAM).

Peltonen was the chairman of the East Uusimaa Police Department's negotiation council from 2018 to 2021 and a member of the Järvenpää parish church council from 2018 to 2022.

In June 2020, Peltonen graduated with a Master of Social Sciences degree.

Peltonen was a candidate in the 2019 Parliamentary elections in Uusimaa and received 3,492 votes but was not elected. He ran again in the 2023 Parliamentary elections in Uusimaa and was elected with 5,747 votes.

=== Illness and death ===
In May 2025, Peltonen required hospital treatment and was diagnosed with a form of kidney disease known as minimal change disease. He was subsequently hospitalised with a bacterial infection as a complication of treatment and was absent from parliament as a result.

On 19 August 2025, Peltonen was found dead in the Parliament House building in Helsinki, with media sources reporting the cause of death as suicide.
