= Miapetra Kumpula-Natri =

Finnish politician (born 1972)

Miapetra Kumpula-Natri MEP
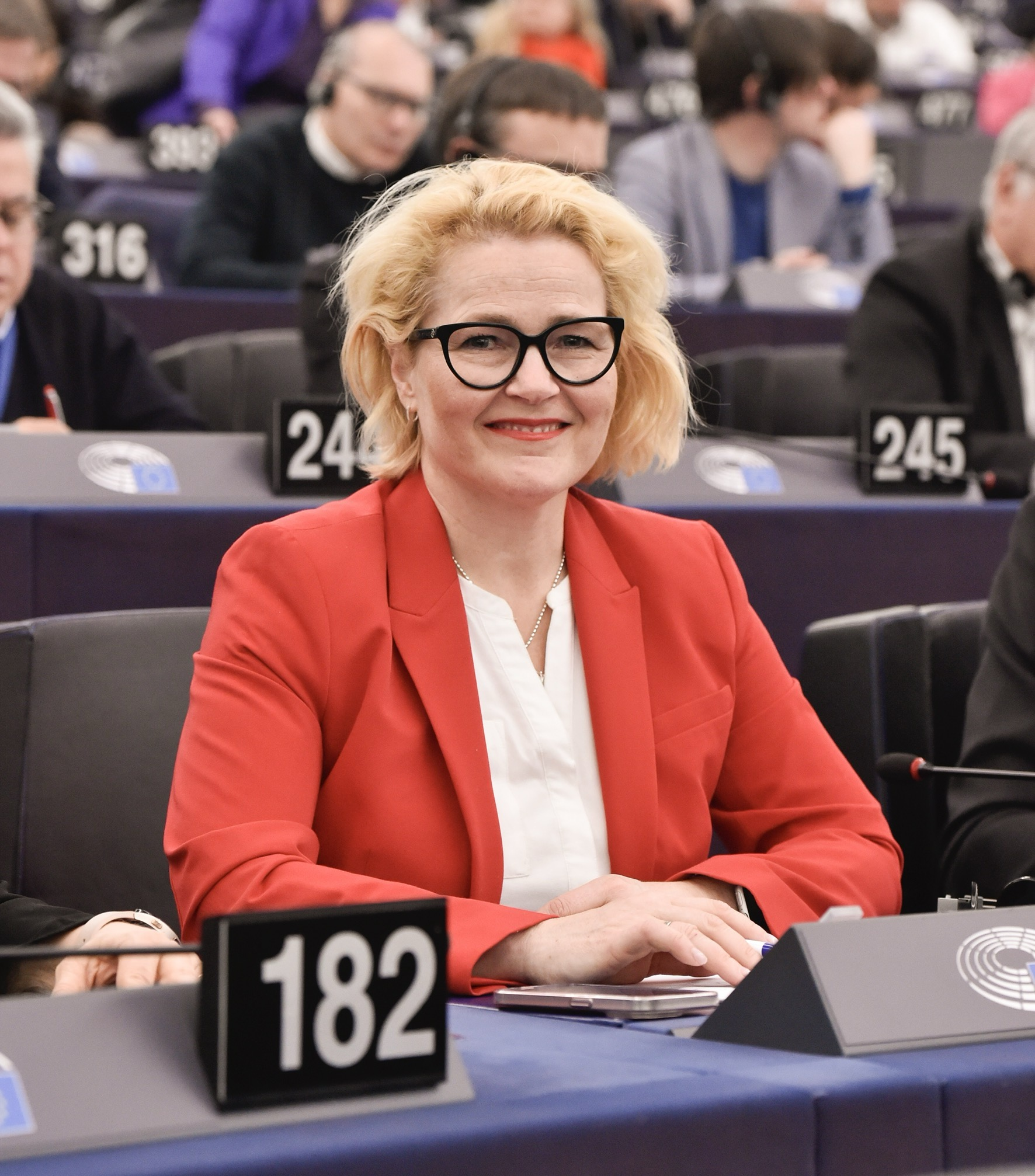

Member of the European Parliament
- In office 1 July 2014 – 16 July 2024
- Constituency: Finland

Personal details
- Born: Miapetra Kumpula-Natri; 19 May 1972 (age 54) Vaasa, Finland
- Party: Finnish; Social Democratic Party; EU; Progressive Alliance of Socialists and Democrats (2014–2024)
- Website: www.miapetra.fi

Miapetra Kumpula-Natri (born 19 May 1972) is a Finnish politician of the Social Democratic Party, part of the Progressive Alliance of Socialists and Democrats. She was a Member of the European Parliament from 2014 to 2024.

== Political career ==
=== Member of the European Parliament, 2014–2024 ===
Kumpula-Natri was a Member of the European Parliament from the 2014 European elections. In parliament, she served on the Committee on Industry, Research and Energy (ITRE). On the committee, she was the Parliament's rapporteur on European Union roaming regulations (2017) and on the European strategy for data (2020).

From 2021, Kumpula-Nari was part of the Parliament's delegation to the Conference on the Future of Europe. In addition to her committee assignments, she was also part of the Parliament's delegation for relations with the United States; she previously belonged to the Parliament's delegations to the EU-Moldova Parliamentary Association Committee and to the Euronest Parliamentary Assembly from 2014 until 2019.

Kumpula-Natri was a member of the European Parliament Intergroup on Climate Change, Biodiversity and Sustainable Development, the European Parliament Intergroup on Anti-Racism and Diversity, the European Parliament Intergroup on Fighting against Poverty and the European Parliament Intergroup on LGBT Rights.

Following the 2019 elections, Kumpula-Natri was part of a cross-party working group in charge of drafting the European Parliament's four-year work program on digitization.

According to Politico Europe, Kumpula-Natri was a candidate to become the Secretary-General of the United Nations, António Guterres's, first-ever Envoy on Technology in 2021; instead, the role went to Chilean diplomat Fabrizio Hochschild Drummond.

=== Later career ===
In addition to her role in parliament, Kumpula-Natri has been serving as a member of the Finnish delegation to the Parliamentary Assembly of the Council of Europe since 2024. In the Assembly, she is a member of the Committee on the Honouring of Obligations and Commitments by Member States of the Council of Europe (Monitoring Committee) (since 2024), the Committee on Political Affairs and Democracy (since 2024) and the Sub-Committee on External Relations (since 2025). In this capacity, she authored a 2025 report on developments in Ukraine.
