= Minister of Education (Finland) =

Finnish cabinet position

The Minister of Education (Finnish: opetusministeri, Swedish: undervisningsminister) is one of the 19 ministerial portfolios which comprise the Finnish Government. The Minister of Education leads Finland's Ministry of Education and Culture.

Finland's incumbent Minister of Education is Anders Adlercreutz of the Swedish People's Party.

== See also ==
- Education in Finland
