= Mari-Leena Talvitie =

Finnish politician

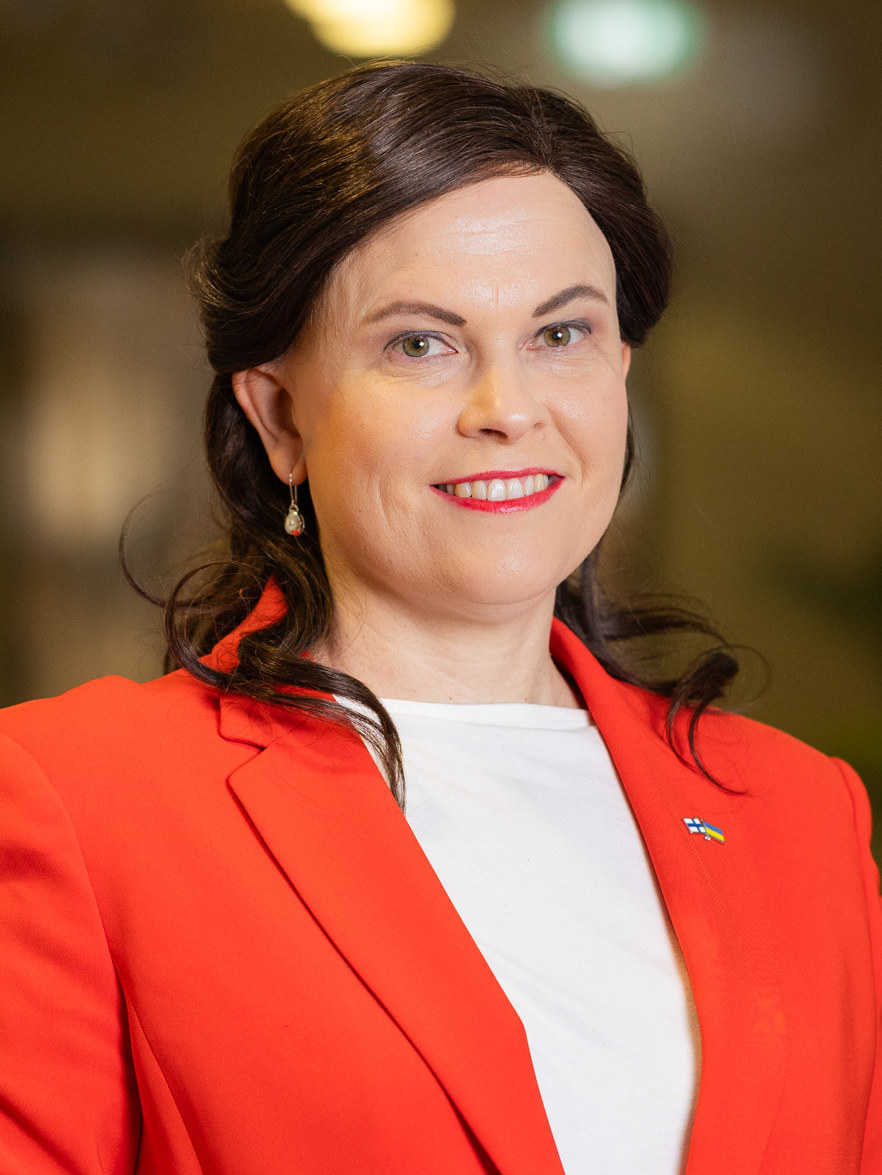
- Talvitie in 2025

Minister of Science and Culture
- Incumbent
- Assumed office 24 January 2025
- Prime Minister: Petteri Orpo
- Preceded by: Sari Multala

Member of Parliament for Oulu
- Incumbent
- Assumed office 22 April 2015

Personal details
- Born: 11 June 1980 (age 46) Vaasa, Ostrobothnia, Finland
- Party: National Coalition Party
- Education: University of Oulu
- Website: mari-leena.net

Mari-Leena Hannele Talvitie (born 11 June 1980) is a Finnish politician currently serving in the Parliament of Finland for the National Coalition Party at the Oulu constituency. She has served as minister of science and culture since 2025.

== Political career ==
She was appointed minister of science and culture on 24 January 2025, succeeding Sari Multala.
