= Minister of Science and Culture =

Finnish cabinet position

The Minister of Science and Culture (Finnish: tiede- ja kulttuuriministeri, Swedish: Forsknings- och kulturminister) is one of the Finnish Government's ministerial positions.

The Orpo Cabinet's incumbent Minister for Science and Culture is since the 24th of January 2025 Mari-Leena Talvitie of the National Coalition Party who replaced Sari Multala the current Minister of the Environment and Climate Change.
