= 2024 Finnish presidential election =

- 28 January 2024 (first round); 11 February 2024 (second round)
- Turnout: 71.55% (first round); 67.58% (second round)
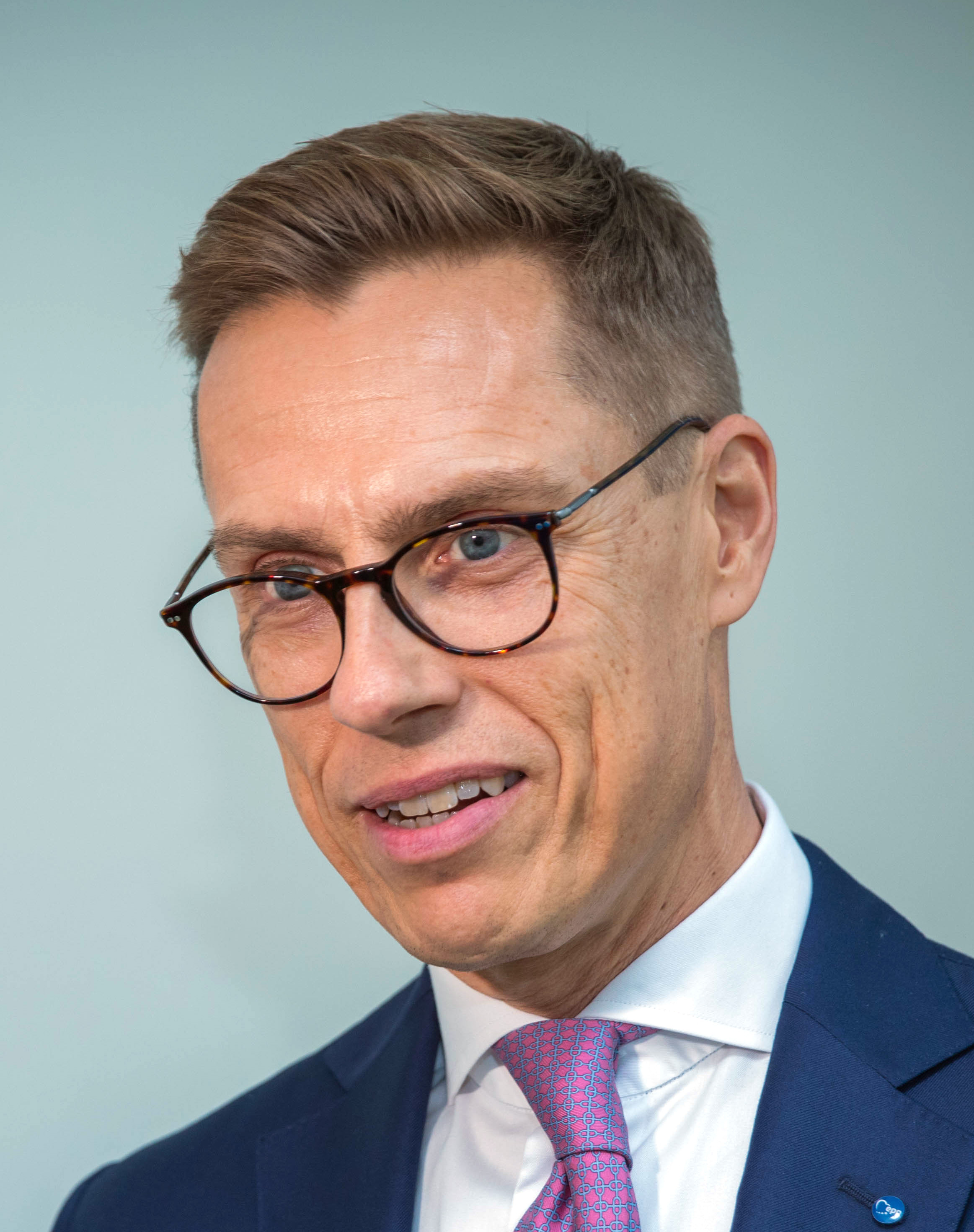

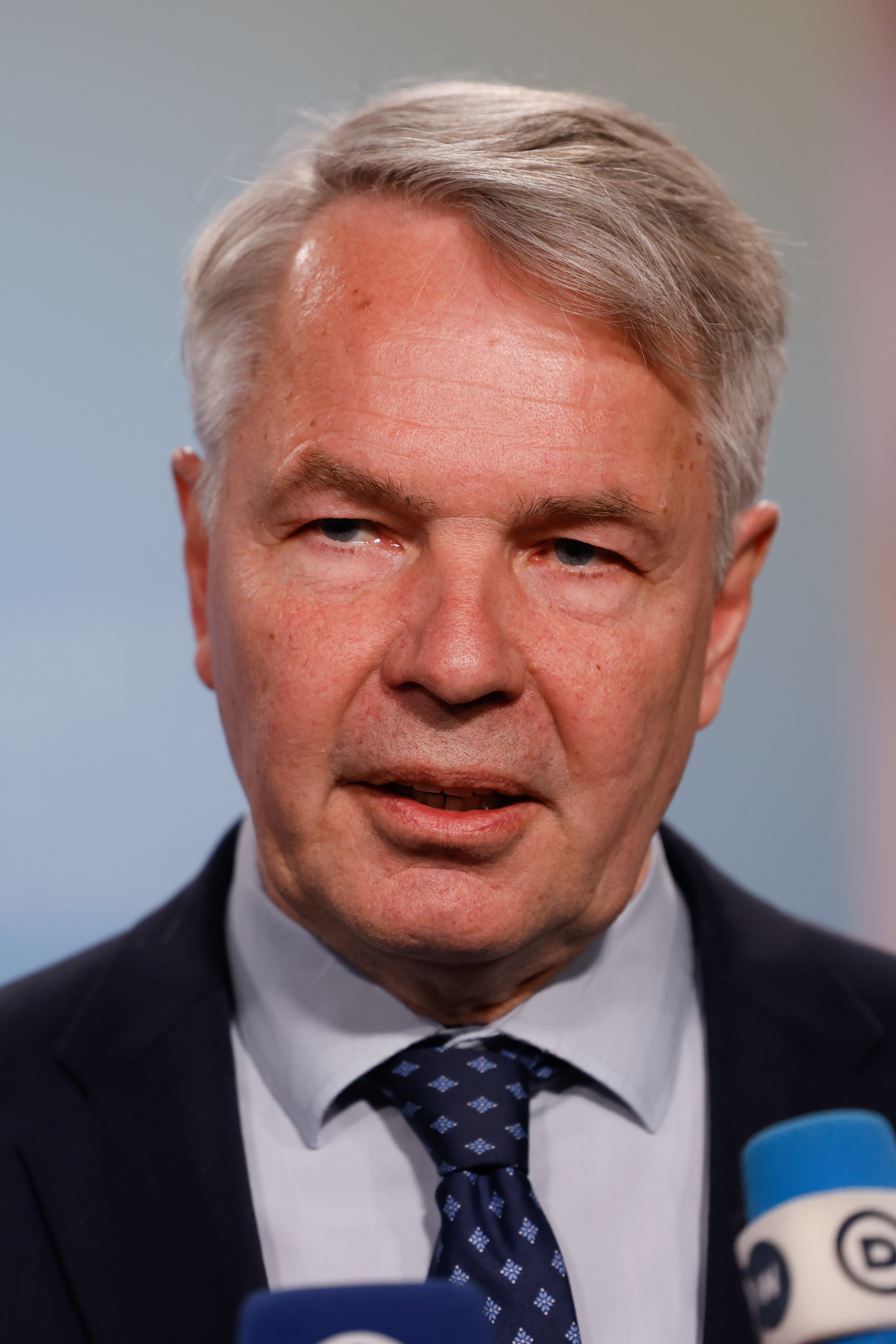
Candidate	Alexander Stubb	Pekka Haavisto
Party	National Coalition	Independent
Alliance	–	Green
Popular vote	1,575,444	1,476,634
Percentage	51.62%	48.38%
President before election
Sauli Niinistö
Independent
Elected President
Alexander Stubb
National Coalition

Presidential elections were held in Finland on 28 January 2024, with a second round held on 11 February. Voters elected a president of the Republic for a six-year term. Incumbent president Sauli Niinistö was term-limited and ineligible to run for re-election, having served the maximum two terms, ensuring that the president elected would be the country's thirteenth.

Had the new president been elected in the first round on 28 January by winning more than half of valid votes cast, their term would have begun on 1 February. However, as no candidate received a majority of votes, Alexander Stubb and Pekka Haavisto contested in a runoff on 11 February with Stubb winning 51.6% to Haavisto's 48.4%. The result in the second round was the closest in the history of presidential elections in Finland, followed by the 2000 presidential runoff. Stubb began his term as president on 1 March.

== Background ==
The presidential election was the first in Finland since it joined the North Atlantic Treaty Organization (NATO) in 2023 in response to the Russian invasion of Ukraine, ending decades of neutrality in foreign policy. The decision was supported by the outgoing president Sauli Niinistö, whose constitutional position also makes him the commander-in-chief of the Finnish Defence Forces and gives him responsibility for defence and foreign policy affairs. Niinistö, who is the only Finnish president to have been elected with an outright majority (62.7 percent) in the first round of voting in a direct popular election during his reelection in 2018, enjoyed over 90 percent popularity ratings since 2021. He rejected efforts by a citizen movement to allow him to run for a third term. An estimated 4.5 million people are eligible to vote in the 2024 election.

== Candidates ==
According to the Constitution of Finland, the president must be a natural-born Finnish citizen. In order to vote in the election, the person must be a Finnish citizen and at least 18 years of age. A candidate may be nominated by a registered political party that has secured at least a single representative in the parliament in the preceding parliamentary election, by a constituency association that has gathered at least 20 000 signatures from eligible voters, or both. The whole country acts as a single constituency.

=== Confirmed candidates ===
Out of the nine confirmed candidates, three were officially running as constituency association candidates, although two also received the nomination of their respective parties. The rest were nominated by a political party.

Candidate		Political office(s)	Campaign logo	Details
Name of the Candidate (Age) Political Party	Image	Political office(s)	Campaign logo	Details
Mika Aaltola (54); Independent	Mika Aaltola	None Other offices: Director of the Finnish Institute of International Affairs (since 2019)	Logo of Mika Aaltola	Aaltola, the director of the Finnish Institute of International Affairs, gained media attention during the Russian invasion of Ukraine, and emerged as a surprise candidate in multiple presidential surveys. He announced his candidacy on 3 August 2023.
Li Andersson (36); Left Alliance	Li Andersson	Leader of the Left Alliance (since 2016) Other offices: Minister of Education (2019–2020, 2021–2023); MP for Finland Proper (since 2015)	Li Andersson 2024 presidential campaign official logo	Andersson served as Minister of Education in the Marin Cabinet from 2019 to 2020 and again from 2021 to 2023. She is the current leader of the Left Alliance. Anderson has consistently been one of the most popular candidates in her own electoral district.
Sari Essayah (56); Christian Democrats	Sari Essayah	Minister of Agriculture and Forestry (since 2023) Other offices: Leader of the Christian Democrats (since 2015); MP for Savo-Karelia (since 2015); MEP (2009–2014)		Essayah has served as Minister of Agriculture and Forestry in the Orpo Cabinet since 2023. Essayah had a successful career in sports before entering politics. She is the current leader of the Christian Democrats.
Pekka Haavisto (65); Independent (Green League)	Pekka Haavisto	MP for Helsinki (1987–1995, since 2007) Other offices: Minister for Foreign Affairs (2019–2023); Minister of the Environment and Development (1995–1999); Leader of the Green League (1993–1995, 2018–2019)	Logo of Pekka Haavisto	Haavisto, a Green League politician and United Nations diplomat, has run as a candidate for the office of President twice before, in 2012 and 2018, both times finishing second behind the incumbent President Sauli Niinistö. He is running as a candidate of a constituency association with the endorsement of the Green League.
Jussi Halla-aho (52); Finns Party	Jussi Halla-aho	Speaker of the Parliament of Finland (since 2023) Other offices: Leader of the Finns Party (2017–2021); MP for Helsinki (2011–2014, since 2019); MEP (2014–2019)		Halla-aho is the current Speaker of the Parliament of Finland. Before entering national politics, he was best known for criticising multiculturalism and Finland's immigration policies in his popular online blog.
Hjallis Harkimo (70); Movement Now	Hjallis Harkimo	Leader of Movement Now (since 2018) Other offices: MP for Uusimaa (since 2015)		Harkimo is a businessman who has led his own political party, Movement Now, since 2018. Harkimo, who made a career as an investor in sports, also hosted the Finnish version of The Apprentice.
Olli Rehn (61); Independent (Centre Party)	Olli Rehn	Governor of the Bank of Finland (since 2018) Other offices: Minister of Economic Affairs (2015–2016); European Commissioner for Economic and Monetary Affairs and the Euro (2010–2014); European Commissioner for Enlargement (2004–2010); MP for Helsinki (1991–1995, 2015–2017)	Logo of Olli Rehn	Rehn is an economist who has served as the governor of the Bank of Finland since 2018. He previously served as a European Commissioner from 2004 to 2014. Rehn runs in the election as a candidate of a constituency association with the endorsement of the Centre Party.
Alexander Stubb (55); National Coalition Party	Alexander Stubb	43rd Prime Minister of Finland (2014–2015) Other offices: Minister of Finance (2015–2016); Minister for European Affairs and Trade (2011–2014); Minister for Foreign Affairs (2008–2011); Leader of the National Coalition Party (2014–2016); MEP (2004–2008); MP for Uusimaa (2011–2017)	Logo of Alexander Stubb	Stubb began his career in politics in 2004, when he was elected to the European Parliament. After holding several offices as a minister, he served as the Prime Minister of Finland from 2014 to 2015. In the summer of 2017, Stubb was appointed Vice President of the European Investment Bank. He currently serves as a professor and the head of a unit at the European University Institute.
Jutta Urpilainen (48); Social Democratic Party of Finland	Jutta Urpilainen	European Commissioner for International Partnerships (since 2019) Other offices: Minister of Finance (2011–2014); Leader of the Social Democratic Party of Finland (2008–2014); MP for Vaasa (2003–2019)		Urpilainen is the incumbent European Commissioner from Finland. A long-time MP and leader of the Social Democratic Party, she served as the Minister of Finance from 2011 to 2014.

=== Unsuccessful candidacies ===
The following notable individuals sought to register as independent candidates, but were unable to collect the 20,000 supporter cards required for registration:

Candidate name and age, political party		Political office(s)	Campaign logo	Details
Ano Turtiainen (56)	Ano Turtiainen	MP for Southeast Finland (2019–2023)		Turtiainen is a former Member of Finnish Parliament for the Finns Party. After he was expelled from the party due to him posting a tweet perceived as mocking the murder of George Floyd in February 2021, he founded his own Power Belongs to the People party. In the end of August 2023, Turtiainen announced in his YouTube channel that he would be his party's candidate for the 2024 presidential election. Turtiainen believed that he would get help from Russia to collect the 20,000 endorsement cards needed for the official candidacy.
Paavo Väyrynen (77)	Paavo Väyrynen	MEP for Finland (1995–2007, 2014–2018) Other offices: Minister for Foreign Trade and International Development from (2007–2011); Minister for Foreign Affairs (1977–1982, 1983–1987, 1991–1993); Minister of Labour (1976–1977); Minister of Education (1975–1976); MP for Lapland (1970–1991, 2007–2011); MP for Uusimaa (1991–1995)		Väyrynen, a veteran politician, participated in the previous presidential elections as the Centre Party candidate on three occasions, securing the second position in 1988, third in 1994, and third in 2012. In 2018, he participated as an independent candidate and finished fourth. In the presidential poll commissioned by Yle in May 2023, Väyrynen was the favorite as the next president of around 2% of the respondents.

== Campaign ==
=== Mika Aaltola ===
Mika Aaltola, the director of Finnish Institute of International Affairs, announced his candidacy on 3 August 2023. He is running as an independent candidate, and therefore must assemble 20,000 signatures from qualified voters to establish a constituency association in order to run for the presidency. Aaltola emerged as a surprise candidate in a presidential survey published by Yle on 28 March 2022. On 27 May 2022, similar results were obtained from a survey conducted by Ilta-Sanomat. Aaltola commented that he was humbled by the results and that "In a situation where the candidates would solely represent Finlandization and behind-the-scenes dealings, I would feel a calling to attempt the impossible for the benefit of my homeland. Therefore, my stance would entirely depend on the candidate lineup."

In a subsequent survey published by Ilta-Sanomat on 21 October 2022, Aaltola had unexpectedly risen to the top. After the results, Aaltola stated: "There is a one percent chance that I will become the President of Finland." He did not completely rule out his candidacy and stated that he would announce a possible candidacy at a later time. On 31 October 2022, Aaltola tweeted: "I am not currently running for any position. My focus is on the ongoing war and the geopolitical challenges of the winter." On 4 November 2022, Helsingin Sanomat published a comprehensive personal profile and interview with Aaltola. Many of the sources interviewed in the article noted that Aaltola no longer behaves like an expert but rather speaks like a preacher or a politician. The same day Aaltola tweeted, that "I have no intention of running for the presidential elections."

On 11 April 2023, Aaltola tweeted that "My support in presidential surveys remains persistently encouraging, even though I have stated a practical "no" on multiple occasions. This was based on the fact that it is practically impossible [to win] outside of political parties. Should I reconsider the matter in the autumn if the support persists?" In the presidential poll commissioned by Yle in May 2023, Aaltola was the favorite as the next president of around 13% of the respondents. On 10 October 2023 Mika Aaltola's support association announced that they had collected 25,000 endorsement cards for Aaltola, exceeding the required 20,000 endorsement card threshold for candidacy.

=== Li Andersson ===
Li Andersson, the leader of the Left Alliance and former Minister of Education, announced her candidacy on 13 September 2023. She was confirmed as the Left Alliance candidate at a party council meeting on 15 October 2023.

=== Sari Essayah ===
Sari Essayah, the leader of the Christian Democrats and incumbent Minister of Agriculture and Forestry, was chosen as the party's presidential candidate at a party meeting on 27 August 2023.

=== Pekka Haavisto ===
Pekka Haavisto, former Minister of Foreign Affairs and Member of Parliament for the Green League, announced his candidacy on 8 June 2023. Haavisto has run for the office twice before, in 2012 and 2018, both times finishing second behind the incumbent President Sauli Niinistö. Haavisto is running as an independent candidate in the presidential elections. The collection of signatures in support of Haavisto began immediately on the same day he announced his candidacy.

According to multiple polls, Haavisto is currently the leading candidate for the presidency. He is the most popular candidate among women and younger voters, as well as across party lines. In the presidential poll commissioned by Yle in May 2023, Haavisto was the favorite as the next president of around 28% percent of the respondents. In a presidential survey published by Ilta-Sanomat on 13 June 2023, which aimed to determine the potential result of a hypothetical second round in the presidential elections, Haavisto emerged as the winner when compared to all the other major potential candidates.

On 3 October 2023, Haavisto's campaign announced that they had so far collected 48,000 endorsement cards, exceeding the required 20,000 endorsement card threshold for candidacy. Should Haavisto win the election, he would be the first openly gay person to become President of Finland.

=== Jussi Halla-aho ===
Jussi Halla-aho, the Speaker of the Parliament of Finland and a Member of Parliament for the Finns Party, announced his candidacy on 7 July 2023. His candidacy was confirmed by the party congress in August. In a survey conducted by Uutissuomalainen in January 2023 among party delegates, over 80 percent of respondents considered Halla-aho the most suitable presidential candidate for the party. In a similar survey conducted in summer 2021, Halla-aho ranked behind Laura Huhtasaari. In the presidential poll commissioned by Yle in May 2023, Halla-aho was the favorite as the next president of around 6% of the respondents.

=== Hjallis Harkimo ===
Hjallis Harkimo, a businessman and the chairman of his own political party Movement Now, was elected as the party's presidential candidate on 18 June 2022. Harkimo became well known in Finland as the owner of the ice hockey team Jokerit and as the face of the TV show "Diili", the Finnish version of The Apprentice. In the presidential poll commissioned by Yle in May 2023, Harkimo was the favorite as the next president of around 1% of the respondents.

=== Olli Rehn ===
Olli Rehn, the Governor of the Bank of Finland and a member of the Centre Party, announced his bid for the presidency on 21 June 2023. Rehn is running as an independent candidate in the elections. The collection of signatures took place at events across the country during the summer of 2023. In the presidential poll commissioned by Yle in May 2023, Rehn was the favorite as the next president of around 15% of the respondents. On 15 September 2023, Rehn's campaign announced that they have collected the required 20,000 endorsement cards for candidacy.

=== Alexander Stubb ===
Alexander Stubb, the former Prime Minister of Finland and a Member of Parliament for the National Coalition Party, announced his candidacy on 16 August 2023, after he had been formally asked to be the party's presidential candidate. In the presidential poll commissioned by Yle in May 2023, Stubb was the favorite as the next president of around 5% of the respondents. When asked about the most preferred candidate of the National Coalition Party, Stubb was the favorite of 40% of the respondents, while Minister of Defence Antti Häkkänen was preferred by 16%, former MP Risto E. J. Penttilä by 9% and Minister for Foreign Affairs Elina Valtonen by 8%.

=== Jutta Urpilainen ===
Jutta Urpilainen, the Finnish European Commissioner, former minister and chair of the Social Democratic Party, was frequently mentioned as a possible candidate for the SDP. On 16 August 2023, the chairman of the Social Democratic Party Sanna Marin asked Urpilainen to run in the 2024 presidential election as the party's candidate. Urpilainen promised to announce her decision only in November 2023. The leadership of the SDP had hoped Urpilainen to be a candidate already in the 2018 presidential elections, but she declined the candidacy citing family reasons. On 19 November 2023, Urpilainen announced her candidacy. This led senior party officials to use life-size cutouts of her in campaign sorties before she began personally campaigning in December 2023. In the presidential poll commissioned by Yle in May 2023, Urpilainen was the favorite as the next president of around 2% of the respondents.

=== Expenditure ===
Financial disclosures released after the election showed that Alexander Stubb's campaign team spent 2.7 million euros during the election period and received 1.2 million euros in private donations, 610,000 euros from businesses and around 710,000 euros from the National Coalition Party. Pekka Haavisto's campaign was found to have spent 1.9 million and received about 1.3 million euros from individual donors, 310,000 euros from the corporate sector, and 160,000 euros from the Green League.

== Electoral issues ==
The electoral campaign has mostly been dominated by international and security issues that have risen since the country's accession to NATO in 2023, particularly relations with Russia. All nine candidates in the first round expressed hard stances on relations with Moscow, with Jussi Halla-aho and Alexander Stubb supporting the idea of revoking Finnish citizenship from dual Russian-Finnish nationals. Halla-aho also supported pushing back migrants at the Finnish-Russian border in response to gatherings of migrants to the area that were suspected to have been orchestrated by the Russian government. Pekka Haavisto supported the closure of the border with Russia, but expressed concern about how the influx of migrants has been used to justify rhetoric against asylum seekers. Stubb also expressed support for the deployment of nuclear weapons in Finland, while Haavisto objected to the idea as well as that of the remilitarization of Åland.

In response to an ongoing massive strike that began during the election campaign, Stubb distanced himself from his National Coalition Party's support for employers and employees' freedom to settle disputes locally and said he would not interfere with labor market issues as president. Haavisto said he would try to bring the parties together for behind-the-scenes negotiations.

== Debates ==
2024 Finnish presidential election debates
Date	Organizers	Moderators	P Present N Not present									Sources
Date	Organizers	Moderators	Aaltola	Andersson	Essayah	Haavisto	Halla-aho	Harkimo	Rehn	Stubb	Urpilainen	Sources
21 December 2023	Yle	Annika Damström	P	P	P	P	P	P	P	P	P	
14 December 2023	MTV3	Jan Andersson, Jaakko Loikkanen	P	P	P	P	P	P	P	P	P	
8 December 2023	Central Chamber of Commerce	Nina Rahkola	N	N	N	P	P	N	P	P	N	
28 November 2023	Taike ry	Kaisa Rönkkö, Mitra Matouf	N	P	P	P	P	P	P	P	N	
20 November 2023	MT, MTK ry	Jouni Kemppainen, Laura Ruohola	P	P	N	P	P	P	P	P	N	
1 November 2023	Aalto Management ry	Jonathan Atwood	P	N	N	P	N	P	P	P	N	
11 October 2023	MTV3	Jaakko Loikkanen	P	N	N	P	N	N	N	P	N	
7 October 2023	Suomen Yrittäjät	Jari Korkki	P	N	N	P	P	N	P	P	N	
18 September 2023	City of Kouvola	Marko Junkkari	P	N	N	P	P	P	P	P	N	
16 August 2023	Talk Helsinki Festival	Tapio Nurminen, Nina Rahkola	P	N	N	P	P	N	P	N	N	

== Second round endorsements ==
Pekka Haavisto

Politicians

- Maria Kaisa Aula (Centre), Member of the Finnish Parliament (1983–2003).
- Eva Biaudet (SFP), Minister of Social Services (1999–2000, 2002–2003).
- Tiina Elovaara (Finns), Member of the Finnish Parliament (2015–2019).
- Tarja Filatov (SDP), Minister of Labour (2000–2007).
- Maria Guzenina (SDP), Minister of Social Services (2011–2013).
- Timo Harakka (SDP), Minister of Labour (2019), Minister of Transport and Communications (2019–2023).
- Tytti Isohookana-Asunmaa (Centre), Minister of Culture (1991–1995).
- Liisa Jaakonsaari (SDP), Minister of Labour (1995–1999).
- Kimmo Kiljunen (SDP), Member of the Finnish Parliament (1995–2011, 2019–).
- Krista Kiuru (SDP), Minister of Housing and Communications (2011–2013), Minister of Education (2013–2014), Minister of Education and Communications (2014–2015), Minister of Family Affairs and Social Services (2022–2023).
- Mai Kivelä (Left), Member of the Finnish Parliament (2019–).
- Martti Korhonen (Left), Minister of Regional and Municipal affairs (1999–2003).
- Erkki Liikanen (SDP), Member of the Finnish Parliament (1972–1990), European Commissioner (1995–2004), Governor of Bank of Finland (2004–2018).
- Anna-Kristiina Mikkonen (SDP), Member of the Finnish Parliament (2023–).
- Silvia Modig (Left), Member of the European Parliament (2019–).
- Markus Mustajärvi (Left), Member of the Finnish Parliament (2003–2023).
- Aino-Kaisa Pekonen (Left), Minister of Social Affairs and Health (2019–2021).
- Jaana Pelkonen (NCP), Member of the Finnish Parliament (2019–2023).
- Kari Rajamäki (SDP), Minister of the Interior (2003–2007).
- Nasima Razmyar (SDP), Member of the Finnish Parliament (2015–2017, 2023–).
- Veronica Rehn-Kivi (SFP), Member of the Finnish Parliament (2016–2023).
- Antti Rinne (SDP), Prime Minister of Finland (2019) and Minister of Finance (2014–2015).
- Elisabeth Rehn (SFP), Minister of Defence of Finland (1990–1995).
- Suldaan Said Ahmed (Left), Member of the Finnish Parliament (2021–2023).
- Hanna Sarkkinen (Left), Minister of Social Affairs and Health (2021–2023).
- Ville Skinnari (SDP), Minister for Development Cooperation and Foreign Trade (2019–2023).
- Pär Stenbäck (SFP), Minister of Education (1979–1982) and Minister for Foreign Affairs (1982–1983).
- Erkki Tuomioja (SDP), Minister of Foreign Affairs (2011–2015, 2000–2007).
- Paula Werning (SDP), Member of the Finnish Parliament (2011–).

Actors

- Peter Franzén
- Minna Haapkylä
- Johannes Holopainen
- Elina Knihtilä
- Jenni Kokander
- Tommi Korpela
- Matleena Kuusniemi
- Inka Kuustonen
- Minka Kuustonen
- Laura Malmivaara
- Mari Perankoski
- Jasper Pääkkönen
- Elsa Saisio
- Satu Silvo
- Martti Suosalo

Musicians

- Anna Eriksson, singer.
- Mikael Gabriel, rapper.
- Janna Hurmerinta, singer.
- Anssi Kela, singer.
- Tommi Läntinen, singer.
- Jare Tiihonen (Cheek), rapper.
- Eicca Toppinen, cellist.
- Olavi Uusivirta, singer.
- Ilkka Vainio, lyricist and music producer.
- Ville Virtanen (Darude), musician.
- Laura Voutilainen, singer.
- Lauri Ylönen, singer.

Other notable individuals

- Marco Bjurström, television host.
- Tapani Brotherus, diplomat.
- Anne Brunila, businesswoman.
- Santtu-Matias Rouvali, conductor.
- Henrik Ehrnrooth, economist.
- Pipsa Hurmerinta, chef.
- Juha Itkonen, writer.
- Jaakko Kalela, Ambassador of Finland.
- Kari Kanala, priest.
- Sixten Korkman, economist.
- Kiira Korpi, figure skater.
- Meeri Koutaniemi, photographer.
- Leena Lehtolainen, writer.
- Rosa Liksom, writer.
- René Nyberg, Ambassador of Finland.
- Topi Nättinen, retired ice hockey player.
- Sofi Oksanen, writer.
- Pirkko Saisio, writer.
- Katariina Souri, artist.
- Tim Sparv, footballer.
- Pajtim Statovci, novelist.
- Katja Ståhl, journalist and presenter.
- Matti Suur-Hamari, snowboarder.
- Jorma Uotinen, dancer.
- Esko Valtaoja, astronomer.
Alexander Stubb

Politicians

- Petteri Orpo (NCP), Prime Minister of Finland (2023–)
- Elina Valtonen (NCP), Minister for Foreign Affairs (2023–)
- Antti Häkkänen (NCP), Minister of Defence (2023–)
- Otto Andersson (SFP), Member of the Finnish Parliament (2023–).
- Sandra Bergqvist (SFP), Minister of Youth, Sport and Physical Activity (2023–).
- Sari Essayah (KD), Minister of Agriculture and Forestry (2023–).
- Teuvo Hakkarainen (Finns), Member of the European Parliament (2019–).
- Hannu Hoskonen (Centre), Member of the Finnish Parliament (2003–2011, 2015–).
- Anneli Jäätteenmäki (Centre), Prime Minister of Finland (2003), Minister of Justice (1994–1995), Member of the European Parliament (2004–2011).
- Bjarne Kallis (KD), Member of the Finnish Parliament (1991–2011).
- Jani Kokko (SDP), Member of the Finnish Parliament (2023–).
- Merja Kyllönen (Left), Member of the European Parliament (2014–), Minister of Transport (2011–2014).
- Henrik Lax (SFP), Member of the Finnish Parliament (1987–2004).
- Mats Löfström (SFP), Member of the Finnish Parliament (2015–).
- Jussi Niinistö (Finns), Minister of Defence (2015–2019).
- Paavo Rantanen (Independent), Foreign Minister of Finland (1995).
- Jari Ronkainen (Finns), Member of the Finnish Parliament (2015–).
- Päivi Räsänen (KD), Minister of the Interior (2011–2015).
- Suvi-Anne Siimes (Left), Minister for Culture (1998–1999) and Minister of Finance (1999–2003).
- Juha Sipilä (Centre), Prime Minister of Finland (2015–2019).
- Joakim Strand (SFP), Member of the Finnish Parliament (2023–).
- Sebastian Tynkkynen (Finns), Member of the Finnish Parliament (2019–).
- Harry Wallin (SDP), Member of the Finnish Parliament (1999–2007, 2014–2019).
- Stefan Wallin (SFP), Minister of Culture and Sport (2007–2011), Minister of Defence (2011–2012).
- Henrik Wickström (SFP), Member of the Finnish Parliament (2023–).
- Ulla-Maj Wideroos (SFP), Second Minister of Finance (2003–2007).

Foreign leaders

- Toomas Hendrik Ilves, President of Estonia (2006–2016).

Athletes

- Valtteri Bottas, racing driver.
- Ristomatti Hakola, cross-country skier.
- Jukka Jalonen, ice hockey coach.
- Sami Jauhojärvi, cross-country skier, Olympic champion.
- Veli-Pekka Ketola, ice hockey player.
- Emma Kimiläinen, racing driver.
- Jarmo Kekäläinen, ice hockey manager.
- Iivo Niskanen, cross-country skier, 3 times Olympic champion.
- Topi Raitanen, runner, European champion.
- Kimi Räikkönen, racing driver.
- Teemu Selänne, ice hockey player.

Other notable individuals

- Sara La Fountain, chef.
- Eino Grön, singer.
- Martti Hetemäki, ministry executive of the Ministry of Finance (2013–2020).
- Bengt Holmström, economist.
- Jaakko Laajava, Ambassador of Finland.
- Linda Lampenius, violinist.
- Päivi Luostarinen, Ambassador of Finland.
- Maija Lähteenmäki, Ambassador of Finland.
- Juha Marttila, Chairman of the Central Union of Agricultural Producers and Forest Owners (2009–).
- Charles Murto, Ambassador of Finland.
- Anu Pentik, designer.
- Vappu Pimiä, television hostess.
- Helena Puolakka, chef.
- Ilkka Remes, author.
- Jaakko Ryhänen, opera singer.
- Alpo Rusi, Ambassador of Finland.
- Jan Store, Finnish Permanent Representative in the European Union (2008–2013).
- Veli Sundbäck, State Secretary for Foreign Affairs (1994–1995).
- Pertti Torstila, State Secretary for Foreign Affairs (2006–2014).
- Petri Tuomi-Nikula, Ambassador of Finland.
- Jukka Valtasaari, Ambassador of Finland.
- Hans Välimäki, chef.
- Göran Stubb, Alexander Stubb's father, NHL Director of European Scouting (CSS) and Finnish ice hockey executive.

== Opinion polls ==
=== First round ===
==== Candidates ====
Poll source	Fieldwork dates											
Poll source	Fieldwork dates	Aaltola Ind.	Stubb NCP	Haavisto Greens	Halla-aho Finns	Rehn Centre	Urpilainen SDP	Andersson Left	Essayah KD	Harkimo Liik	Others	Don't know/Undecided
Taloustutkimus	17–23 Jan 2024	3%	27%	23%	18%	14%	5%	7%	2%	1%	–	
Verian	17–20 Jan 2024	3%	22%	20%	18%	12%	5%	6%	1%	1%	–	9%
Tietoykkönen	9–17 Jan 2024	2%	21%	22%	11%	11%	4%	7%	2%	1%	–	19%
Kantar Agri	12–17 Jan 2024	2%	24%	21%	15%	12%	7%	7%	2%	1%	–	9%
Verian	20–21 Dec 2023	4%	24%	22%	13%	9%	5%	7%	2%	1%	–	9%
Tietoykkönen	5–13 Dec 2023	4%	23%	22%	11%	9%	6%	8%	1%	1%	2%	13%
Kantar Agri	15–20 Dec 2023	3%	23%	23%	12%	10%	6%	6%	2%	1%	–	14%
Taloustutkimus	27 Nov–7 Dec 2023	4%	31%	23%	10%	12%	7%	5%	2%	2%	2%	–
Tietoykkönen	14–23 Nov 2023	5%	21%	24%	10%	9%	4%	6%	?%	?%	?%	?%
Kantar Public	20–21 Nov 2023	5%	24%	20%	10%	10%	7%	7%	2%	1%	2%	11%

==== Potential candidates ====
Poll source	Fieldwork dates														
Poll source	Fieldwork dates	Aaltola Ind.	Stubb NCP	Vapaavuori NCP	Haavisto Greens	Halla-aho Finns	Huhtasaari Finns	Rehn Centre	Vanhanen Centre	Heinäluoma SDP	Marin SDP	Urpilainen SDP	Andersson Left	Others	Don't know/Undecided
	19 November 2023	Jutta Urpilainen declares her candidacy													
TNS Kantar Agri	Nov 2023	6.6%	18.2%	–	25.8%	9.7%	–	11.2%	–	–	–	4.5%	6.6%	4.4%	10.5%
Taloustutkimus	Nov 2023	9%	28%	–	26%	8%	–	14%	–	–	–	4%	7%	6%	–
Kantar Public	Oct 2023	8%	17%	–	28%	9%	–	10%	–	–	–	3%	6%	5%	10%
Taloustutkimus	Oct 2023	10%	22%	–	29%	8%	–	14%	–	–	–	3%	7%	6%	10%
	13 Sep 2023	Li Andersson declares her candidacy													
Taloustutkimus	Sep 2023	10%	19%	–	31%	9%	–	11%	–	–	–	5%	6%	6%	–
Tietoykkönen	Sep 2023	12%	18%	–	26%	9%	–	9%	–	–	–	3%	3%	1%	16%
	27 August 2023	Sari Essayah declares her candidacy													
Taloustutkimus	Aug 2023	12%	19%	–	32%	9%	–	10%	–	–	–	5%	7%	6%	–
	16 August 2023	Alexander Stubb declares his candidacy													
Kantar TNS	Aug 2023	15.6%	3.3%	0.1%	27.4%	8.8%	–	11.1%	–	0.7%	–	1.8%	3.9%	10.2%	17%
	3 August 2023	Mika Aaltola declares his candidacy													
	7 July 2023	Jussi Halla-aho declares his candidacy													
	21 June 2023	Olli Rehn declares his candidacy													
	8 June 2023	Pekka Haavisto declares his candidacy													
Taloustutkimus	May 2023	13%	5%	–	28%	6%	1%	15%	2%	1%	5%	2%	2%	17%	–
Maaseudun Tulevaisuus	Apr 2023	10.4%	4.6%	–	23.3%	8.5%	–	10.8%	?%	–	–	?%	–	–	–
Taloustutkimus	Dec 2022	11%	7%	–	25%	7%	–	14%	?%	–	7%	?%	2%	4%	–
Taloustutkimus Taloustutkimus	Dec 2022	8%	4.5%	4%	17.3%	5.8%	–	13.7	?%	–	?%	?%	–	–	–
	18 June 2022	Hjallis Harkimo declares his candidacy													
Taloustutkimus	Mar 2022	4%	4%	4%	16%	7%	–	20%	4%	–	9%	3%	–	3%	–
Taloustutkimus	Jul 2021	–	5%	4%	12%	7%	–	14%	5%	3%	11%	3%	3%	10%	–
Kantar TNS	Feb 2021	–	2%	4%	7%	5%	–	19%	4%	4%	13%	3%	1%	12%	51%
Taloustutkimus	Jan 2021	–	4%	6%	9%	6%	2%	11%	6%	4%	16%	3%	2%	29%	–
Taloustutkimus	Dec 2020	–	5%	5%	9%	5%	2%	8%	6%	4%	16%	3%	3%	32%	3%
TNS Kantar Agri	Jun 2020	–	–	5.7%	12.4%	6.2%	–	11.0%	–	4.7%	9.7%	–	3.0%	7.6%	41.8%
TNS Kantar Agri	Feb 2020	–	–	6%	18%	9%	–	11%	–	6%	–	–	–	–	–
Taloustutkimus	Feb 2020	–	4%	5%	22%	8%	2%	8%	4%	4%	4%	4%	4%	26%	4%
Taloustutkimus	Dec 2019	–	–	4%	17%	6%	3%	10%	–	4%	–	7%	7%	26%	16%
Tietoykkönen	Oct 2019	–	–	10%	33%	10%	4%	11%	–	7%	–	6%	8%	10%	–
Taloustutkimus	Jan 2018	–	–	9%	27%	–	7%	7%	4%	4%	–	4%	4%	26%	9%

=== Second round ===
==== Pekka Haavisto vs. Alexander Stubb ====
Poll source	Fieldwork dates	Haavisto Greens	Stubb NCP	Others/ Undecided
Taloustutkimus	Feb 2024	46%	54%	–
Kantar Agri	Feb 2024	46%	54%	–
Tietoykkönen	Feb 2024	47%	53%	–
Verian	Feb 2024	46%	54%	–
Verian	Jan 2024	43%	57%	–
Taloustutkimus	Dec 2023	42%	58%	–
Kantar Public	Nov 2023	42%	55%	3%
Taloustutkimus	Nov 2023	45%	55%	–
Kantar Public	Oct 2023	51%	46%	3%
Taloustutkimus	Oct 2023	51%	49%	–
Taloustutkimus	Sep 2023	45%	42%	13%
Taloustutkimus	Aug 2023	48%	40%	12%
Ilta-Sanomat	16 May 2023	52%	30%	17%

==== Hypothetical second rounds ====
===== Pekka Haavisto vs. Olli Rehn =====
Poll source	Fieldwork dates			
Poll source	Fieldwork dates	Haavisto Greens	Rehn Centre	Others/ Undecided
Taloustutkimus	Dec 2023	51%	49%	–
Kantar Public	Nov 2023	50%	47%	3%
Taloustutkimus	Oct 2023	53%	47%	–
Kantar Public	Oct 2023	53%	44%	3%
Taloustutkimus	Oct 2023	56%	44%	–
Taloustutkimus	Sep 2023	51%	39%	10%
Taloustutkimus	Aug 2023	54%	36%	10%
Ilta-Sanomat	16 May 2023	52%	35%	13%

===== Pekka Haavisto vs. Mika Aaltola =====
Poll source	Fieldwork dates			
Poll source	Fieldwork dates	Haavisto Greens	Aaltola Ind.	Others/ Undecided
Taloustutkimus	Dec 2023	62%	38%	–
Kantar Public	Nov 2023	61%	37%	2%
Taloustutkimus	Oct 2023	60%	40%	–
Kantar Public	Oct 2023	56%	41%	3%
Taloustutkimus	Oct 2023	59%	41%	–
Taloustutkimus	Sep 2023	53%	36%	11%
Taloustutkimus	Aug 2023	53%	38%	10%
Ilta-Sanomat	16 May 2023	49%	35%	16%

===== Pekka Haavisto vs. Jussi Halla-aho =====
Poll source	Fieldwork dates			
Poll source	Fieldwork dates	Haavisto Greens	Halla-aho Finns	Others/ Undecided
Taloustutkimus	Dec 2023	66%	34%	–
Kantar Public	Nov 2023	65%	33%	2%
Taloustutkimus	Oct 2023	70%	30%	–
Kantar Public	Oct 2023	66%	31%	3%
Taloustutkimus	Oct 2023	72%	28%	–
Taloustutkimus	Sep 2023	65%	26%	9%
Taloustutkimus	Aug 2023	67%	23%	10%
Ilta-Sanomat	16 May 2023	63%	25%	12%

===== Pekka Haavisto vs. SDP candidates =====
Poll source	Fieldwork dates				
Poll source	Fieldwork dates	Haavisto Greens	Urpilainen SDP	Marin SDP	Others/ Undecided
Taloustutkimus	Dec 2023	61%	39%	–	–
Kantar Public	Nov 2023	59%	38%	–	3%
Kantar Public	Oct 2023	64%	31%	–	5%
Taloustutkimus	Sep 2023	57%	23%	–	20%
Ilta-Sanomat	16 May 2023	55%	21%	–	24%
Ilta-Sanomat	16 May 2023	52%	–	24%	23%

===== Alexander Stubb vs. Olli Rehn =====
Poll source	Fieldwork dates			
Poll source	Fieldwork dates	Stubb NCP	Rehn Centre	Others/ Undecided
Taloustutkimus	Dec 2023	65%	35%	–
Kantar Public	Nov 2023	61%	38%	1%
Taloustutkimus	Oct 2023	60%	40%	–
Kantar Public	Oct 2023	54%	42%	4%
Taloustutkimus	Oct 2023	56%	44%	–
Taloustutkimus	Sep 2023	51%	31%	18%
Taloustutkimus	Aug 2023	52%	31%	17%

===== Alexander Stubb vs. Mika Aaltola =====
Poll source	Fieldwork dates			
Poll source	Fieldwork dates	Stubb NCP	Aaltola Ind.	Others/ Undecided
Taloustutkimus	Dec 2023	77%	23%	–
Kantar Public	Nov 2023	72%	25%	3%
Taloustutkimus	Oct 2023	71%	29%	–
Kantar Public	Oct 2023	60%	37%	3%
Taloustutkimus	Oct 2023	65%	35%	–
Taloustutkimus	Sep 2023	55%	27%	18%
Taloustutkimus	Aug 2023	52%	31%	17%

===== Alexander Stubb vs. Jussi Halla-aho =====
Poll source	Fieldwork dates			
Poll source	Fieldwork dates	Stubb NCP	Halla-aho Finns	Others/ Undecided
Taloustutkimus	Dec 2023	79%	21%	–
Kantar Public	Nov 2023	74%	24%	2%
Taloustutkimus	Oct 2023	81%	19%	–
Kantar Public	Oct 2023	76%	21%	3%
Taloustutkimus	Oct 2023	82%	18%	–
Taloustutkimus	Sep 2023	70%	18%	12%
Taloustutkimus	Aug 2023	73%	16%	11%

==== Additional ====
A poll commissioned by the University of Helsinki to find voters' reasons for not choosing specific candidates that was conducted before the first round of voting found that a third of respondents said they would not support Haavisto's candidacy on account of his same-sex Ecuadorian partner, Antonio Flores, with university professor Jaakko Hillo noting that most of those who cited this as an issue were more likely to describe themselves as right-wing conservatives.

== Youth election ==
The Finnish National Youth Council, or Allianssi, held a mock election between 8 January and 12 January for people under the age of 18. The participants included among others schools and local youth councils from 198 different municipalities. Number of votes cast was a record 94,456, and the results were as follows:

Candidate	Share of votes (%)
Alexander Stubb	21.52
Jussi Halla-aho	20.84
Pekka Haavisto	13.96
Li Andersson	12.19
Hjallis Harkimo	9.52
Jutta Urpilainen	5.73
Olli Rehn	4.94
Mika Aaltola	3.57
Sari Essayah	2.34

== Disinformation ==
In the days leading up to the vote, some Finns Party supporters accused the public broadcaster Yle of being biased against Jussi Halla-aho, prompting Yle's CEO to respond that "Yle does not campaign against or for anyone." Several of Halla-aho's rivals also defended the broadcaster, with Jutta Urpilainen describing the allegations as the "international trend of right-wing populists questioning elections for their own gain arriving in Finland as well", and Pekka Haavisto saying that there were no "signs of outside interference despite concerns regarding that". Dimitri Qvintus, a Social Democrat party official and spokesperson for former prime minister Sanna Marin, said that the allegations "would fit perfectly with the new Finns Party playbook" of trying to promote doubt in the election results in the event that Halla-aho loses the election, adding that the government should have immediately addressed these claims.

Fake posters appeared in tram stops in Helsinki, in which images of Jussi Halla-aho were altered to include phrases such as "Fascist Halla-aho" and "Finland must be a safe space for Nazis." An altered poster of Haavisto was also displayed with a falsely-attributed quote.

== Voting ==
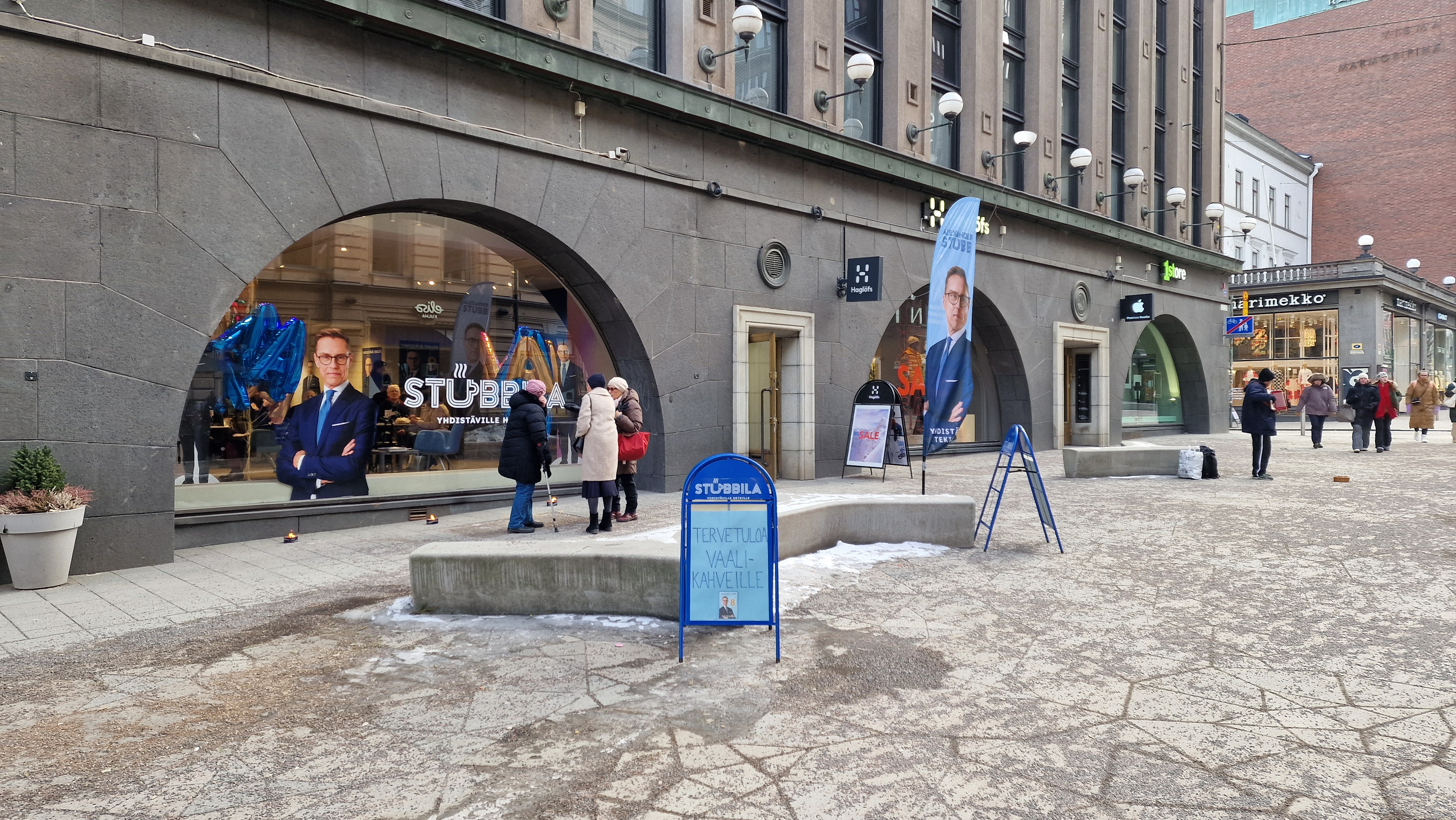
National Coalition Party candidate Alexander Stubb presidential candidate campaign café

=== First round ===
Early voting opened on 17 January, with turnout estimated at 44 percent, or about 1.88 million votes, an increase from the 36.7 percent recorded in 2018. This continued until 23 January. Voting at overseas polling stations that were set up in Finnish diplomatic missions was conducted from 17 to 20 January, during which 58,757 out of an estimated 263,000 eligible Finnish citizens abroad voted, an increase of 6,253 from 2018. In the first round of voting on 28 January, polling stations opened at 09:00, and closed at 20:00. Initial results are expected at around midnight, while official results are expected to be confirmed on 30 January.

=== Second round ===
For the runoff, early voting was held from 31 January to 6 February while overseas voting ran from 31 January to 3 February. Turnout in advanced voting reached 46 percent, or around 1.96 million voters. In the second round of voting on 11 February, polling stations opened at 09:00 and closed at 20:00. The result of the second round were confirmed on 14 February.

== Results ==
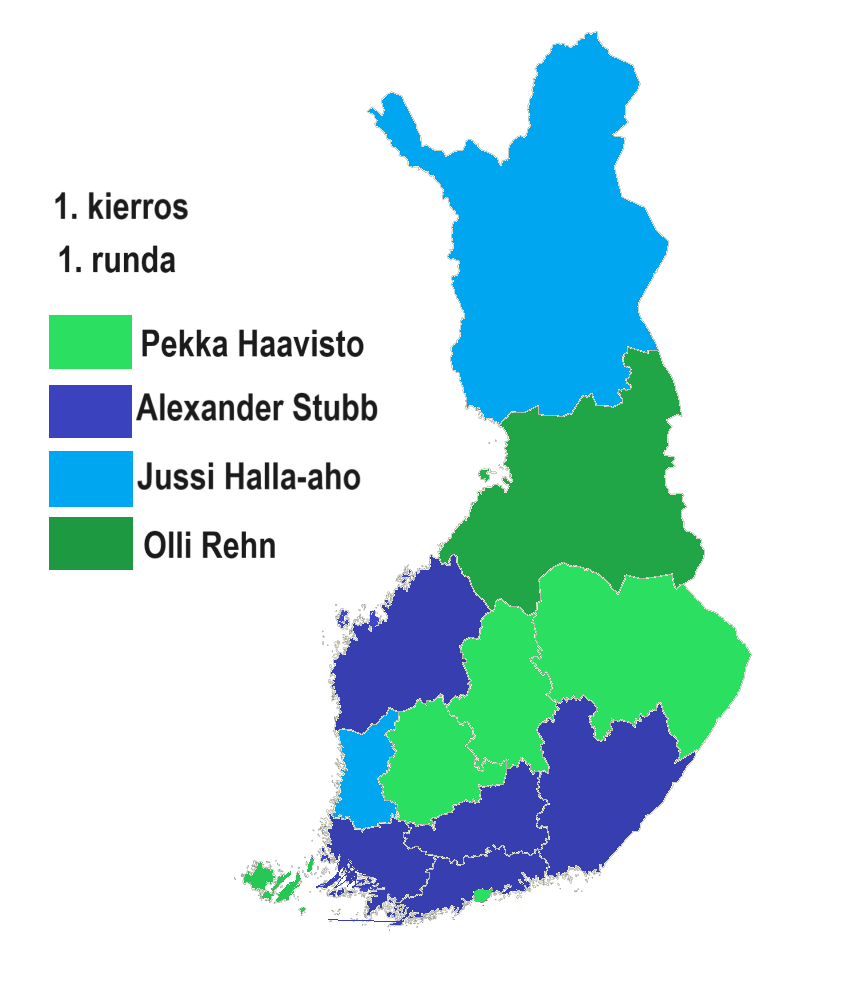
Most popular candidate by constituency in the first round

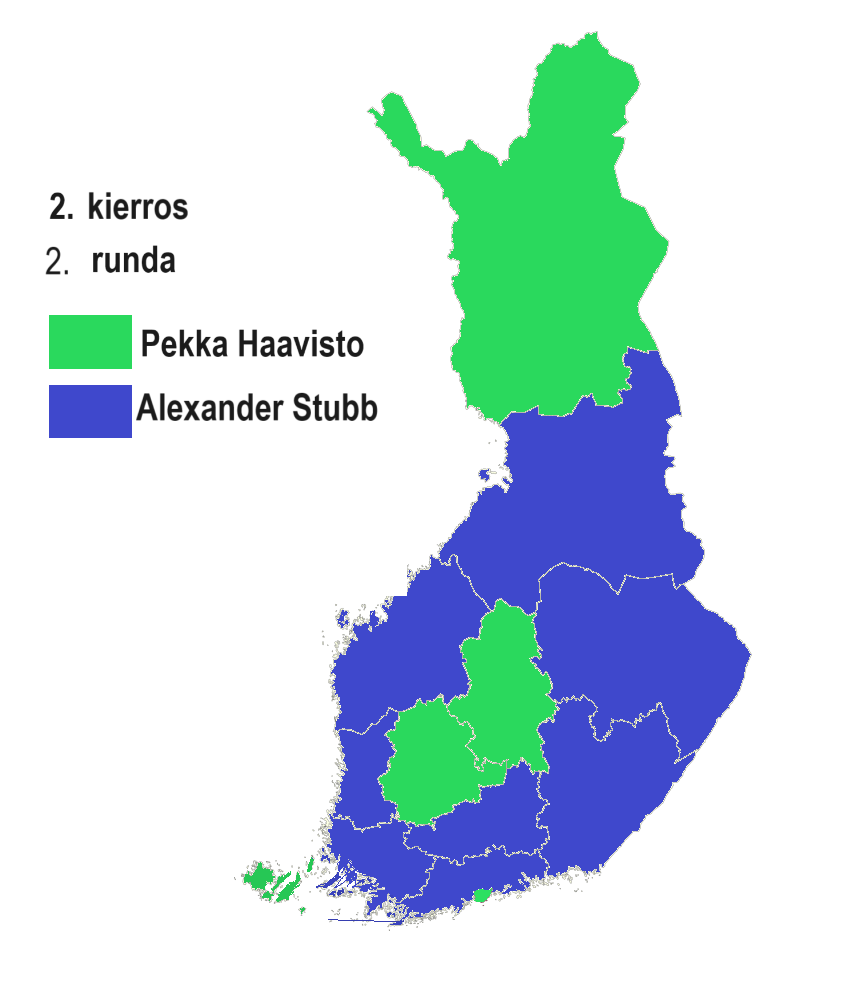
Most popular candidate by constituency in the second round

Candidate	Party	First round		Second round	
Candidate	Party	Votes	%	Votes	%
Alexander Stubb	National Coalition Party	882,388	27.21	1,575,444	51.62
Pekka Haavisto	Independent (Green League) (Note: Despite filing to run as an independent, Haavisto's candidacy was endorsed by the Green League.)	836,712	25.80	1,476,634	48.38
Jussi Halla-aho	Finns Party	615,802	18.99		
Olli Rehn	Independent (Centre Party) (Note: Despite filing to run as an independent, Rehn's candidacy was endorsed by the Centre Party.)	496,759	15.32		
Li Andersson	Left Alliance	158,579	4.89		
Jutta Urpilainen	Social Democratic Party	140,867	4.34		
Sari Essayah	Christian Democrats	47,847	1.48		
Mika Aaltola	Independent	47,467	1.46		
Hjallis Harkimo	Movement Now	17,030	0.53		
Total		3,243,451	100.00	3,052,078	100.00
Valid votes		3,243,451	99.72	3,052,078	99.34
Invalid/blank votes		9,095	0.28	20,389	0.66
Total votes		3,252,546	100.00	3,072,467	100.00
Registered voters/turnout		4,546,041	71.55	4,546,041	67.59
Source: Ministry of Justice (First round, Second round)

== Aftermath ==
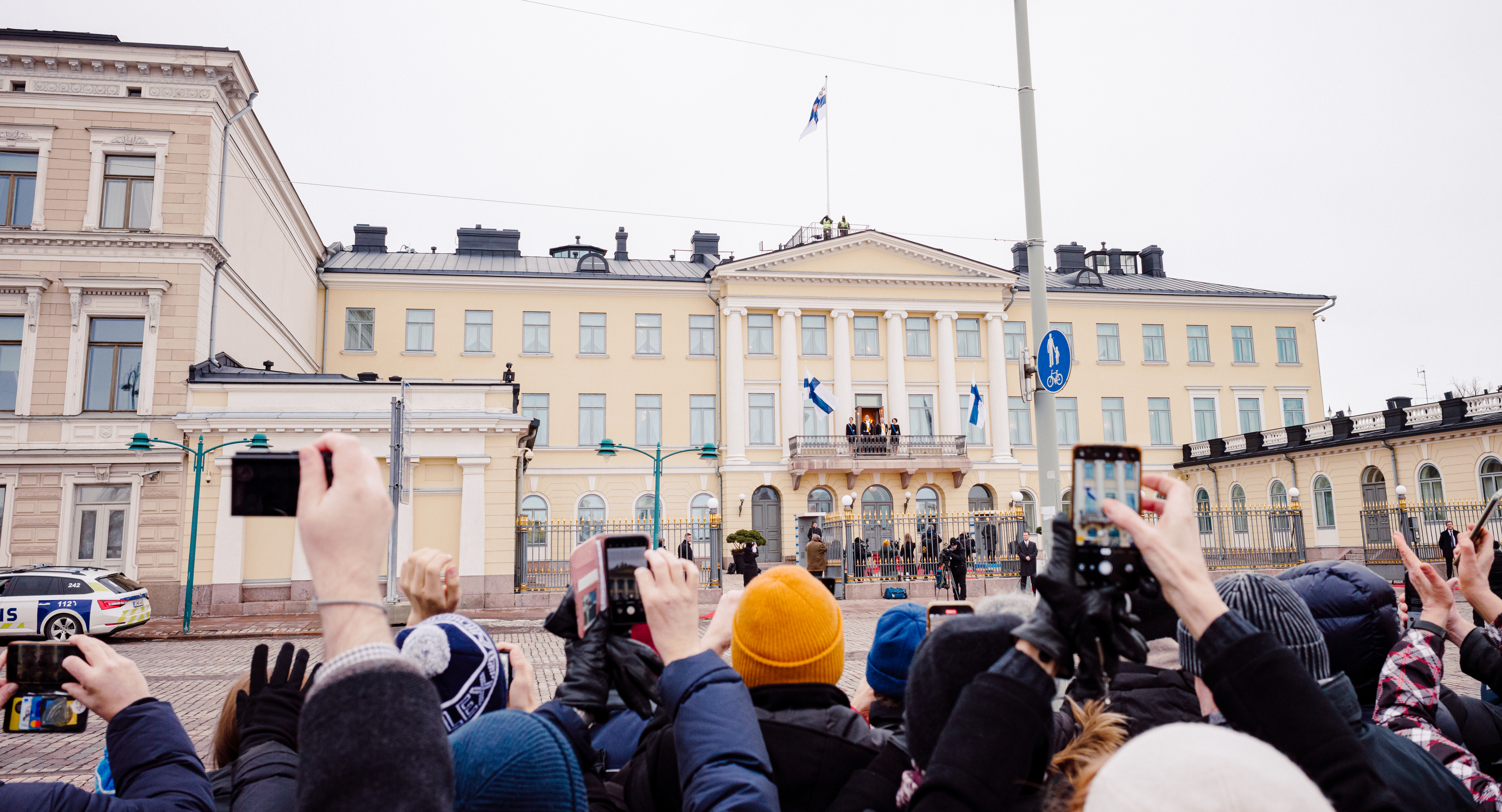
Inauguration of the President

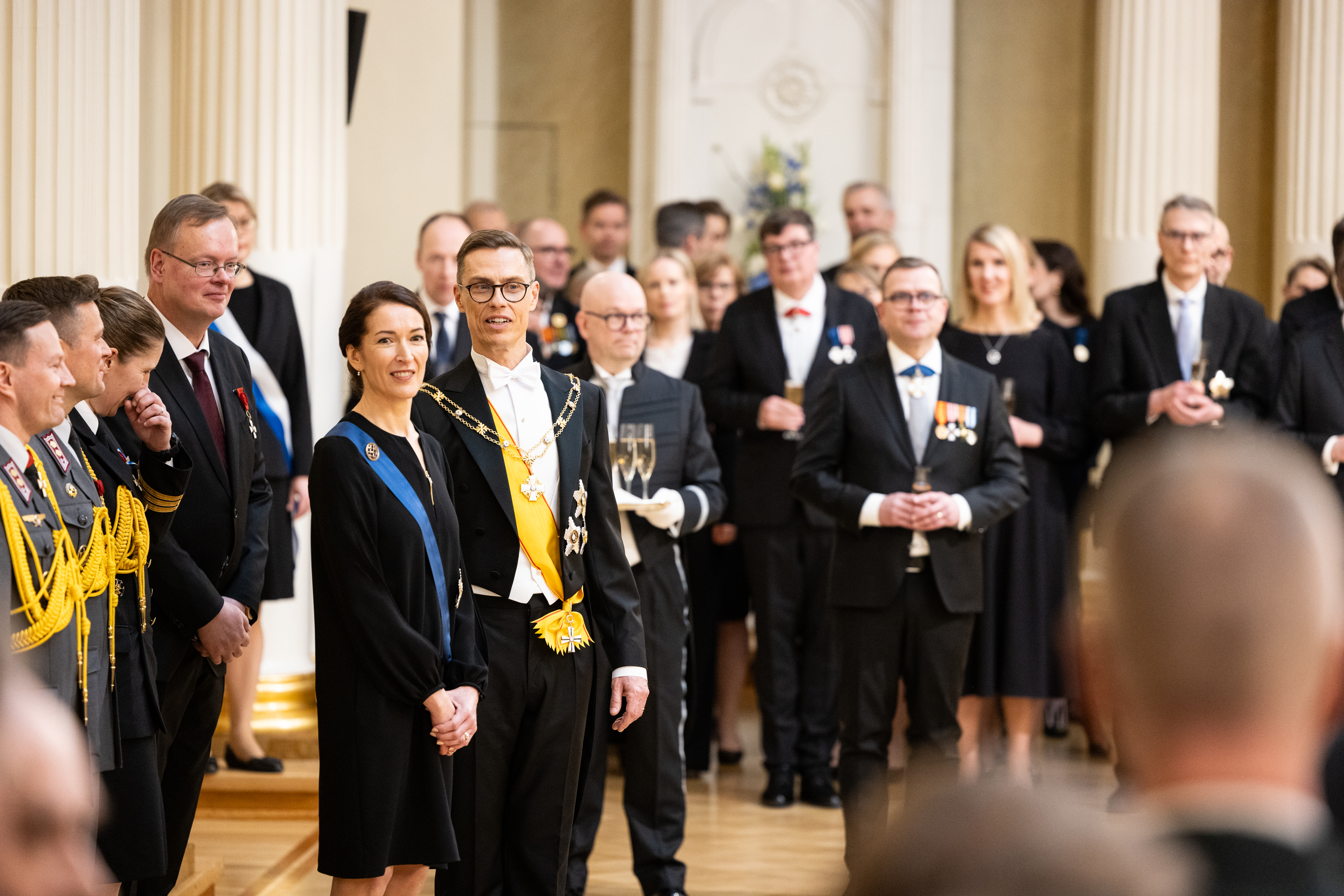
Inauguration of the President

Following the result of the first round, Alexander Stubb said: "We have at this stage gotten the kind of result for which we can be grateful and humble." Pekka Haavisto described his showing as "a really great result." Jussi Halla-aho said that he had to be "satisfied" with the result, noting that it had been "better" than what he had expected. It was the Finns party's best presidential election result in history. Olli Rehn expressed thanks to the voters. Mika Aaltola said that he was happy that foreign and security policy were on the electoral agenda but said that it would take some time before he would "take on something like this again." Rehn, Sari Essayah, and Harry Harkimo declined to endorse any candidate in the runoff, with Essayah saying that "citizens can vote according to their preference," and Harkimo saying that both Stubb and Haavisto "have the same opinions about everything."

Following the result of the second round, Haavisto conceded defeat to Stubb and publicly shook hands with him at Helsinki City Hall. In response, Stubb expressed appreciation and pride at having been "able to run" with him. He also called his victory as "the greatest honour" of his life.

== Reactions ==
Ukrainian president Volodymyr Zelenskyy congratulated Stubb on his victory and said that he was looking forward "to advancing our relations and our shared vision of a free, united, and well-defended Europe".
