= Mika Aaltola =

Finnish political scientist (born 1969)

Mika Aaltola MEP
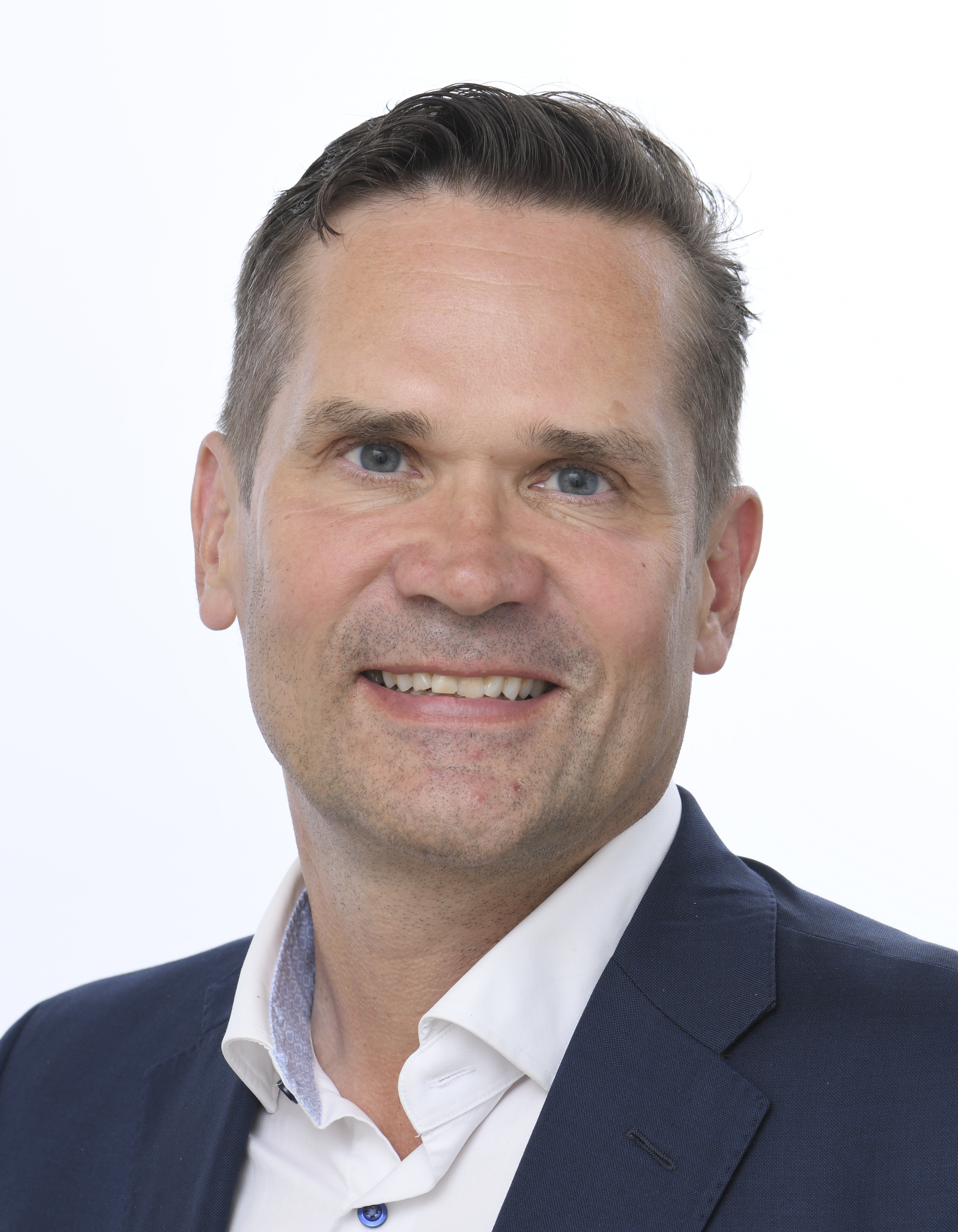
- Official portrait, 2024

Member of the European Parliament for Finland
- Incumbent
- Assumed office 16 July 2024

Personal details
- Born: Mika Petteri Aaltola; 2 May 1969 (age 57) Jämsänkoski, Finland
- Party: National Coalition Party (2024–present)
- Other political affiliations: Independent (until 2024)
- Spouse: Kirsi Aaltola (m. 2019)
- Children: 1
- Relatives: Elisa Aaltola (sister)
- Education: Columbia University; Tampere University
- Occupation: Political scientist; Politician

Mika Petteri Aaltola (born 2 May 1969) is a Finnish political scientist and a member of the European Parliament. He is a former director of the Finnish Institute of International Affairs. He has gained media attention since the Russian invasion of Ukraine, which he follows and regularly comments on. Aaltola holds a doctorate in social sciences. He works as docent at Tampere University, and was a part-time professor at Tallinn University. He ran as an independent candidate for president of Finland in the 2024 presidential election.

He was elected as a member of the European Parliament in the 2024 European Parliament election. He represents the National Coalition Party, which is part of the European People's Party (EPP).

== Early life and university ==
Aaltola was born in Jämsänkoski, located in the Central Finland region, on 2 May 1969. He grew up in the village of Kintaus in Petäjävesi, where his mother Sinikka Aaltola worked as a primary school teacher since 1974. His father Juhani Aaltola was a professor of education at the University of Jyväskylä. Mika Aaltola's sister is animal philosopher Elisa Aaltola.

It was common for the family to talk about philosophy, science and politics. Aaltola experienced severe bullying at school when he was young, due to being a "shy" and "introverted" "teacher's son", as he considered himself. Nevertheless, Aaltola felt that his childhood was "rewarding". Anti-bullying is still an important topic for him, and in the spring of 2024, he participated in the MLL Up event against school bullying.

Aaltola completed a Bachelor of Arts in Psychology at Columbia University in New York City, where he also volunteered in George H.W. Bush's 1992 presidential campaign. Aaltola initially wanted to become a psychiatrist, but eventually moved to Tampere, where he commenced his studies in political science and gained his doctorate in 1999. Aaltola's dissertation dealt with the European Union's ability to survive internal crises, and it was awarded the best dissertation paper of the year.

== Academia and research ==
=== Academic career ===
Aaltola is a docent of international politics at the University of Tampere. He was a part-time professor at Tallinn University between 2013 and 2023. Aaltola has been a visiting professor at the University of Minnesota. In addition, he has been a visiting researcher at Cambridge University, Sciences Po University of Paris and Johns Hopkins University. Aaltola has published seven books, many of which focus on Finnish foreign policy.

=== Finnish Institute of International Affairs ===
In 2019, Aaltola was elected director of the Finnish Institute of International Affairs (FIIA). Aaltola competed with Juha Jokela, who was nominated by the nomination working group as director in his place, but per the board's vote, Aaltola was elected by a vote of 5–4. Some of FIIA's employees said that they felt that Aaltola had acted ruthlessly during the appointment process by sending a presentation to the board in which he claimed to be a more qualified applicant than Jokela based on his number of academic citations. Additionally, Jokela was viewed with scepticism by some board members after information about a suspected case of bullying.

Aaltola's works and research dealt with the global role of the United States, great power politics, changes in the world order, and Finland's foreign and security policy. He has also studied the relationship between humanitarian politics and power politics.

In 2019, he published the book Poutasään jälkeen (English: After the dry weather) about international politics since the beginning of the Russo-Ukrainian war in 2014. Aaltola was named Tampere University alumnus of the year in September 2022. In October, he released the book Mihin menet Suomi? Pelon aika Euroopassa, a collection of his notes and texts from June 2021 to July 2022. His latest book, Havahtuminen (English: Awakening), was released in early October.

Due to political campaigns, he was on leave from August 2023 to January 2024 and from April 2024 to the beginning of June.

==== Ukraine war (since 2022) ====
Upon the Russian invasion of Ukraine, Aaltola became a prominent voice in Finnish foreign policy. Aaltola also gained popularity in culture and media. In addition to being an active commentator on domestic and global affairs, Aaltola also appeared in numerous TV shows, such as Elämäni Biisi.

== Political career ==
=== 2024 presidential election ===
==== Early speculation ====
Owing to his high-profile during the Russian invasion of Ukraine, Aaltola rose to the peak position of an October 2022 poll in anticipation of the presidential elections in 2024. Aaltola responded that he found it unlikely he would become president, but that if he ran, he would do so as an independent.

==== Announcement ====
On 3 August 2023, Aaltola announced in Luumäki his intention to run for president as an independent, saying he "felt an obligation" to help Finland. In his speech, he mentioned that:

"One cannot refuse (the presidency) just because the road is narrow. You have to be ready to take on challenges, especially when the world is in great turmoil. Finland needs a reforming president and a new kind of leadership".

==== Campaign ====
Since his announcement, Aaltola has been actively campaigning, whilst being off duty from his role at the Finnish Institute of International Affairs. Since he is running as an independent, his team needed to collect the required 20,000 support cards. This was later achieved. His campaign was active on X (previously Twitter), Meta-platforms, LinkedIn and TikTok.

==== Results ====
In the election, Aaltola finished second-to-last with 1.46% of the total votes, only outperforming Hjallis Harkimo of Movement Now.

=== 2024 EU Parliament Election ===
Aaltola announced his candidacy for the European Union Parliament election in April, 2024, as a member of the National Coalition Party (NCP). He mentioned he had discussed with Prime Minister Petteri Orpo, who encouraged him to run as a candidate. His central themes were related to foreign and security policy, NATO-integration as well as aiding Ukraine. Although Aaltola ranked high in many national polls and was fourth among all candidates in the national youth elections, he was at the same time a big question mark for many political pundits. Aaltola ended up receiving 95,651 votes in the European elections, which made him the most-voted candidate of the National Coalition Party, and was elected a member of the European Parliament. He got the third most votes nationally, right after Li Andersson and Eero Heinäluoma. According to some analysts, Aaltola's success was partly based on his presidential campaign, but also on his emphasis on security policy, as was also the case with Pekka Toveri.

=== Member of the European Parliament (2024–) ===
In the European Parliament, Aaltola serves as a full member of the Foreign Affairs Committee and as a substitute member of the International Trade Committee. He is also the vice-chair of the United Kingdom Delegation and a Deputy Member of the United States Delegation. In December 2024, his citizens' initiative to withdraw from the Ottawa Treaty, among other foreign and security policy experts, collected the required 50,000 signatures in four days. Aaltola serves as the Chair of the EPP delegation of the Coalition Party MEPs.

== Views ==
=== Foreign policy ===
Aaltola was running his 2024 presidential campaign on a platform of support for Ukraine, increase in defense spending to 3%, support for NATO, and allowing for weapons from the United States to be stored in Finland for strategic purposes.

Aaltola describes himself as a classical realist in the theory of international relations. His foreign policy view has been influenced by thinkers such as Thucydides and Plato as well as President Sauli Niinistö. He emphasizes the understanding of great power politics and the importance of defense. At the same time, for example, he strongly disagrees with the neo-realist John Mearsheimer, arguing how the West's surrender "created space" for Russia to attack Ukraine and influence North Africa.

=== Domestic politics ===
According to Aaltola, empathy should be an important basis for political influence, which he refers to as "empathy society". During Yle's big election debate, Aaltola said that economic policy should be practised "beyond election terms, as unanimously agreed" and that the Orpo government's austerity policy was not necessarily conducted at the "right time".

=== Political spectrum ===
On the Helsingin Sanomat political spectrum, Aaltola was labeled slightly economically centre-left, and socially neither conservative nor liberal.

== Personal life ==
His sister is philosopher Elisa Aaltola.

Aaltola is married to Kirsi Aaltola, and their first child was born in April 2022.

At the age of 37, Aaltola had a benign brain tumor removed from the frontal cavity whilst in the United States. According to Aaltola, the probability of dying from the operation would have been as high as 80 percent. Aaltola survived, but his right eye was damaged, as a result of which he lost 30 percent of his vision.

Aaltola is a Christian by religion.
