= Athenis Finlandiae =

Cultural event in Jyväskylä, Finland

Athenis Finlandiae is a yearly event arranged in the city of Jyväskylä and it is an example of a different kind of a cultural event that combines history, art and entertainment. The goals of the event are to cherish the Latin language and cultural heritage as well as to inspire youth to continue working with Latin.

"Athenis Finlandiae" translates to "in the Athens of Finland". The city of Jyväskylä received this epithet in the 1850s when the Finnish national poet, Elias Lönnrot, once wrote a letter to another Finland-minded writer, Wolmar Styrbjörn Schildt, saying: "You Schildt, over there in Jyväskylä, the Athens of Finland, the cradle of the arts and sciences..." Schildt, living in Jyväskylä at that time, had just developed the Finnish terms for the words "science" and "arts".

Later, this humorous reference to Athens started to become reality, as the first schools and pedagogical institutions where Finnish was the language of teaching, were established in Jyväskylä. Today, Jyväskylä is particularly well known for its university and other educational institutions, as well as its lively and fresh cultural scene. Since 2008, the city has hosted the annual Athenis Finlandiae event, the concept of which lies in the classical culture and languages. The event is arranged by the MuKuTa association.

== History ==
=== Athenis Finlandiae 2008 ===
Offered trips to central Finland nature and gave the audience an opportunity to learn the Latin language. The Patron of the event was Minister Mauri Pekkarinen.

=== Athenis Finlandiae 2009 ===
Focused on the Latin language and culture as well as went deep into Latin literature. The Patron of the event was Minister Henna Virkkunen.

=== Athenis Finlandiae 2010 ===
The event theme was philosophy. The Patron of the event was Tarja Halonen, the President of the Republic.

=== Athenis Finlandiae 2011 ===
The main themes were poetry, rhetoric and antique Rome as well as the travelers' Rome. The Patron of the event was Petri Tuomi-Nikula, the Finnish Ambassador to Italy.

=== Athenis Finlandiae 2012 ===
Russia, ancient wars, astronomy and astrology.

=== Athenis Finlandiae 2013 ===
Germany, Middle Ages, Hanseatic League.

== Future events ==
- Year 2014 some of themes will be Norway, Middle Ages, and Saint Olaf.
