= Otto Andersson =

Otto Andersson may refer to:

- Otto Andersson (musicologist) (1879–1969), Finnish musicologist
- Isak Otto Andersson (1881–1925), Finnish politician
- Otto Andersson (Finnish politician) (born 1983), Finnish politician
- Otto Andersson (footballer) (1910–1977), Swedish footballer
