= Elections in Åland =

Åland elects on a regional level a legislature. The Parliament of Åland has 30 members, elected for a four-year term by proportional representation. Åland has a multi-party system, with numerous parties in which no one party often has a chance of gaining power alone, and parties must work with each other to form coalition governments.

== See also ==
- Elections in Finland: Åland legislative election
- Electoral calendar
- Electoral system
