= Movement Now =

Finnish political party

Movement Now Liike Nyt (Finnish) Rörelse Nu (Swedish)
- Abbreviation: MN; Liik; RN
- Chairperson: Harry Harkimo
- Secretary: Petteri Redsven
- Parliamentary group leader: Harry Harkimo
- Deputy chair: Panu Peitsaro
- Founders: Harry Harkimo; Mikael Jungner; Alex Nieminen; Helene Auramo; Karoliina Kähönen; Sarian Antila; Tuomas Enbuske
- Founded: 18 April 2018
- Split from: National Coalition Party
- Headquarters: Simonkatu 2B, 00100 Helsinki
- Youth wing: Liike Nyt Nuoret
- Women's wing: Liikkeen Naiset
- Membership (2018): 8,000
- Ideology: Economic liberalism Pro-Europeanism
- Political position: Centre-right
- European affiliation: Five Star Direct Democracy (2019)
- Colors: Fuchsia
- Eduskunta: 1 / 200
- European Parliament: 0 / 15
- Municipalities: 19 / 8,586
- County seats: 4 / 1,379

Website
- liikenyt.fi

Movement Now (MN; Finnish: Liike Nyt [ˈliːke nyt], Liik; Swedish: Rörelse Nu, RN) is an economically liberal political party in Finland. It is positioned on the centre-right of the political spectrum.

It was founded by then-National Coalition Party (NCP) member of parliament Harry Hjallis Harkimo and six other people as a political movement. The movement was registered as a party on 14 November 2019.

== History ==
On 19 April 2018, member of parliament Harry Harkimo announced that he would resign from his party, the National Coalition Party. On 21 April, he announced that he had founded a political movement of his own called Movement Now. The movement had been founded by him and seven others and registered with the Finnish Patent and Registration Office one day before Harkimo's resignation from the NCP. The seven founding members are Harkimo, former SDP party secretary Mikael Jungner, Alex Nieminen, Helene Auramo, Karoliina Kähönen, Sarian Antila, and Tuomas Enbuske.

Harkimo subsequently formed a one-man parliamentary group, the Movement Now parliamentary group, in the Parliament of Finland. On 21 January 2019, an MP of the Blue Reform and former Speaker of the Parliament of Finland Maria Lohela announced that she would leave the Blue Reform in order to join Liike Nyt's parliamentary group. In addition to the Parliament, the movement has gained members in municipalities. The group Parempi Heinola in the city assembly of Heinola joined Liike Nyt. With its eight members out of a total of 43, the movement is the largest in Heinola. A similar association with the Uusi Jämsä group of Jämsä was agreed upon in August 2018. Uusi Jämsä was the third largest group in the city council when joining the movement with its six members.

In the 2019 Finnish parliamentary election, Harkimo was elected to the parliament as the sole representative from Movement Now. 115 candidates stood for election, short of the movement's target of 150. Besides Harkimo, candidates included another founder of the party Auramo, and the former's parliamentary assistant Mirita Saxberg. Because the movement was not a registered party, each of its candidates had to gather signatures of at least 100 voters to form a constituency association. The party used controversial microtargeting in its campaign advertising.

In June 2019, Harkimo announced that the Movement Now would start collecting signed support cards in order to become a registered political party. The Ministry of Justice announced on 14 November 2019 that Movement Now had been registered as a political party.

== Political stances ==
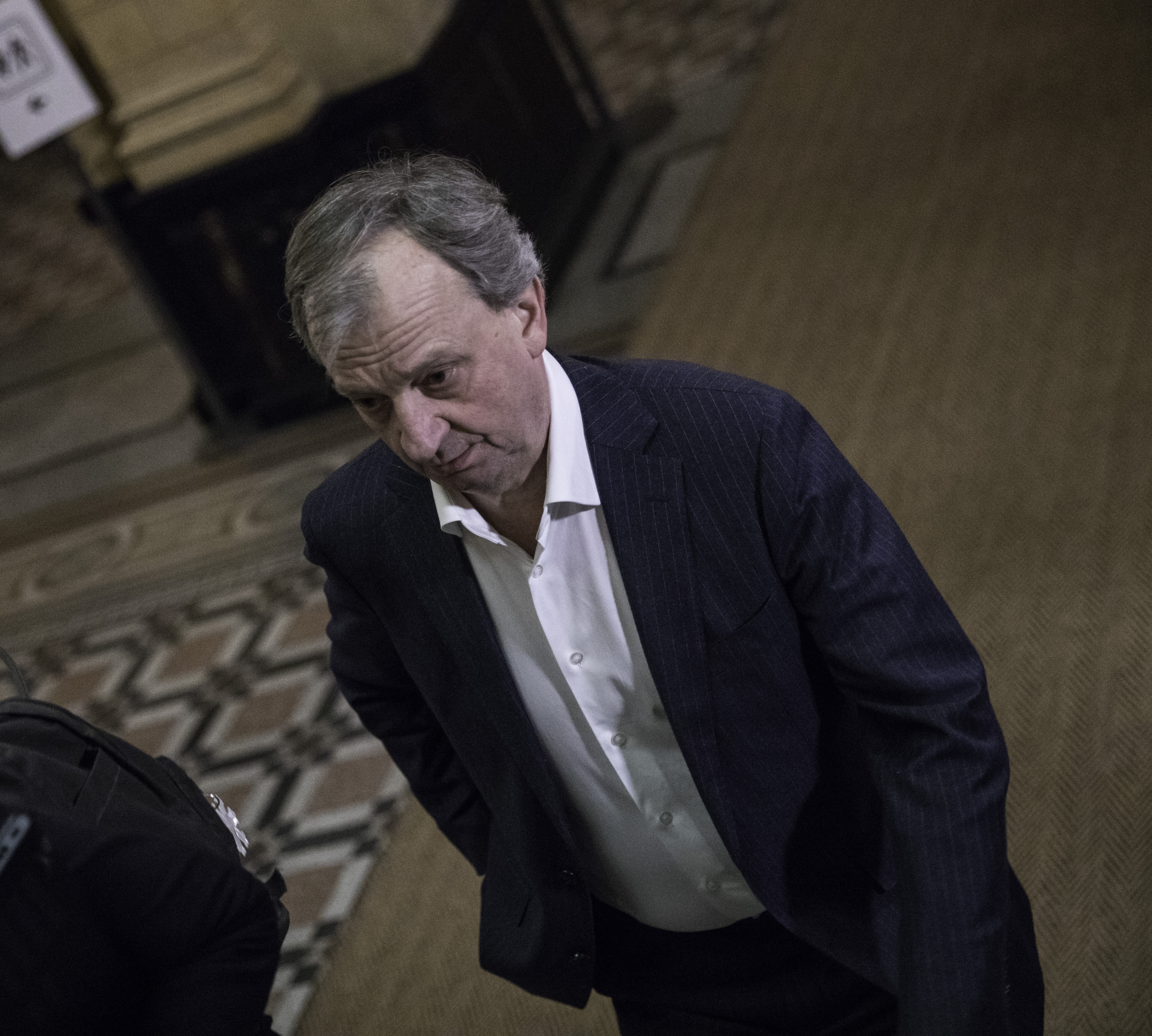
Hjallis Harkimo is the founder and chairperson of the party.

Thirty core principles were agreed upon by members. Besides these, candidates are not aligned ideologically with the group and are allowed to take independent stances on local issues. Election themes include Baltic Sea clean up and social security for entrepreneurs.

The party defends generally liberal policies. In economics, it supports reducing the corporate tax and what they see as unnecessary regulations on businesses, and in social policy, the party defends legalizing the sale of alcohol in grocery stores.

In international policy, although the party believes that the European Union has been beneficial for Finland in many respects, the Euro currency has not, and that the debt and migration crises, along with Brexit, has forced the EU to reconsider in which areas Brussels is needed and where it is not. The party opposes a European State.

It also supports achieving carbon neutrality by 2045, instead of the Marin government's target of 2035, believing the latter to be unrealistic. The party also supports nuclear power.

The party believes in expanding private health care as a way of reducing queues in public health facilities.

It also believes that Finland should adopt a national D visa entitling skilled migrants to work while at the same time keeping out migrants who would be a burden on society. The party also advocates reforming the asylum system and mandating that immigrants should be integrated so that they become part of Finnish society, and that employment plans should be drawn up for all immigrants over the age of 18. It also believes that all incoming immigrants should prove that they will be active members in Finnish society, and that those who provide false information or committed serious crimes such as terrorism should be deported.

The main six principles of the party are:

1. Everybody should be taken care of
2. A free market is a good way to develop society, if its rules are fair
3. Climate change is real and decisions must be taken in an environmentally sustainable manner
4. Entrepreneurship is the most effective way to do things if given space
5. Valuing the individual
6. Pro-Europeanism

== Election results ==
=== Parliament of Finland ===
Election	Votes	%	Seats	+/-	Government
2019	69,427	2.25	1 / 200	New	Opposition
2023	74,962	2.42	1 / 200	0	Opposition

=== European Parliament ===
Election	Votes	%	Seats	+/–	EP Group
2024	9,641	0.53 (#10)	0 / 15	New	–

=== Municipal elections ===
Election	Councillors	Votes	%
2021	49	38,943	1.6
2025	19	10,481	0.4

=== Presidential elections ===
Election	Candidate	1st round		2nd round		Result
Election	Candidate	Votes	%	Votes	%	Result
2024	Hjallis Harkimo	17,013	0.5 (#9)			Lost

== Organization ==
The party's headquarters are on Abrahaminkatu in Helsinki. The party has about 8,000 members, and employs four people full-time. The chairperson of the party is Harry Harkimo.

== See also ==
- Elections in Finland
- National Coalition Party
