= Merikukka Forsius =

Finnish politician

Merikukka Forsius (born August 12, 1972, in Helsinki) is a Finnish politician and former member of the Finnish Parliament, representing the centre-right National Coalition Party (Kokoomus). She was first elected to parliament in 1999 from the Finnish Green League, but defected to National Coalition Party in 2008. She has also been a member of the city council of Vihti from 1997 to 2003.

Forsius has a master's degree in education from the University of Turku. She has been married twice, and has two sons: Dan (born 2004) and Jim (born 2008). Her second husband was Harry Harkimo, and he is the father of her first son, Dan. Forsius and Harkimo divorced after Dan's birth. Forsius was involved with prime minister Matti Vanhanen during spring and summer 2007. In September 2007 she got engaged to Vihti municipal manager Petri Härkönen, but they split up in November. Their son, Jim, was born in spring 2008. Forsius currently lives in Vihti with her sons. In 2014 it was announced that Forsius got engaged to a female teacher.
