= Elections in Finland =

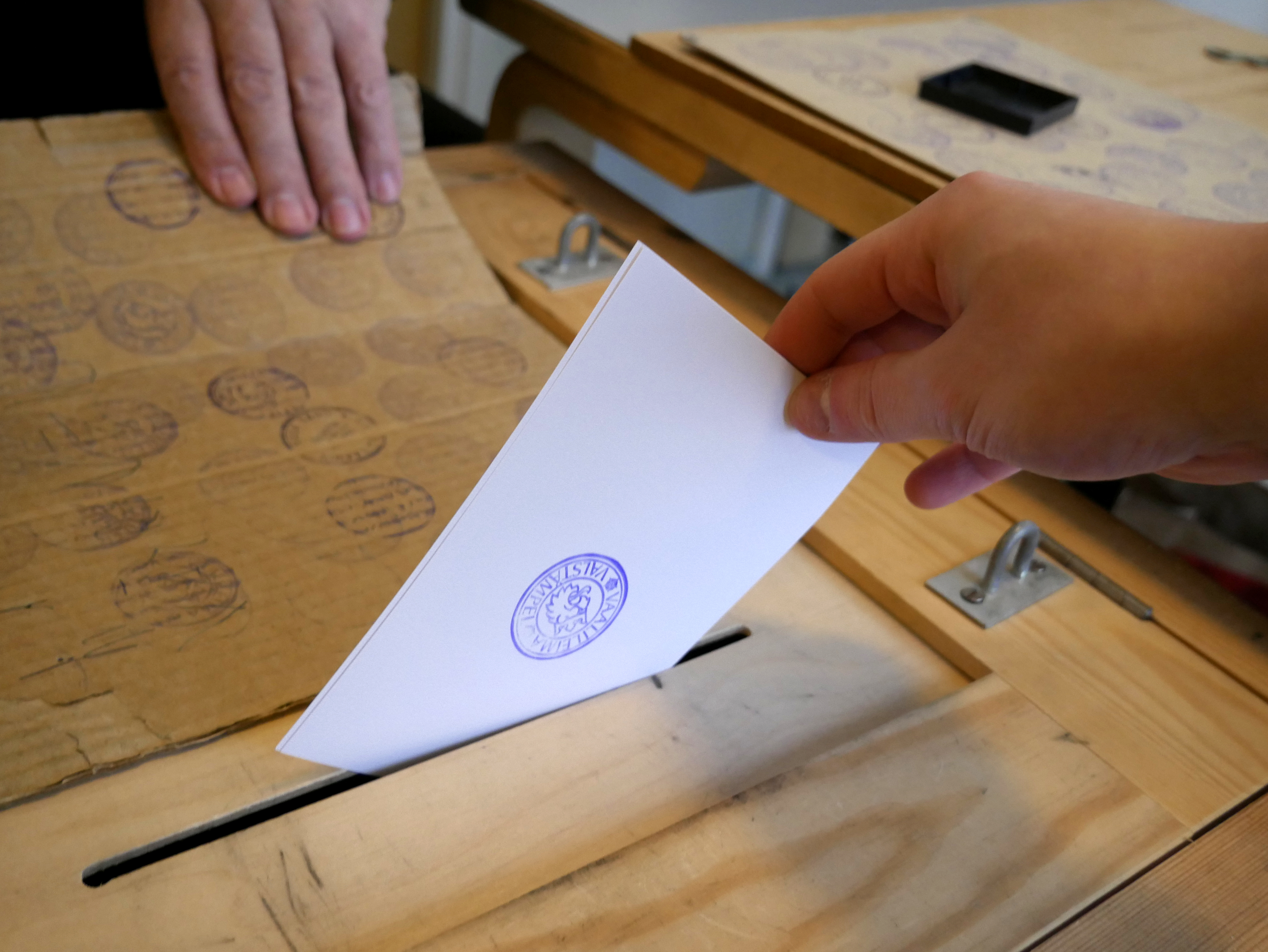
Voting

There are five types of elections in Finland: elections for the president, the parliament, county councils of the wellbeing services counties, municipal councils and the European Parliament. Normally, all Finnish citizens aged 18 or older are eligible to vote. Some non-citizens may also have the right to vote in municipal, county and European elections.

Finland holds a presidential election every six years to elect the President of Finland. The election uses a two-round system based on a direct popular vote. If no candidate receives more than 50% of the vote in the first round, a runoff is held between the two candidates with the highest number of votes. The same person can serve as president for no more than two consecutive terms.

Parliamentary elections are held every four years to elect members of the parliament. The elections use a system of proportional representation in multi-seat constituencies and allocate seats according to the D'Hondt method. Finland has a multi-party system making it uncommon for a single party to achieve a majority in parliament. As a result, Finnish governments are typically formed through coalition agreements involving multiple political parties.

County and municipal elections are held every four years at the same time to elect the councils of the 21 wellbeing services counties and 292 municipalities (the City of Helsinki also carries out the tasks of wellbeing service counties in its area). In Åland, municipal elections are held separately, at the same time as the election of the Parliament of Åland.

European Parliament elections are held every five years. Finland is allocated 15 seats in the European Parliament.

== Presidential elections ==
The president of Finland is elected by popular vote for a six-year term and can serve a maximum of two consecutive terms. Since 1988, the election has followed a two-round system. If a candidate receives more than 50% of the vote in the first round, they are elected president. If no candidate achieves a majority, the two candidates with the most votes proceed to a second round, where the candidate with more votes is elected president. The first round is usually held on the fourth Sunday of January in the election year, with the potential second round taking place two weeks later.

Political parties that won at least one seat in the previous parliamentary election are eligible to nominate a presidential candidate. Additionally, candidates can be nominated by constituency associations formed by at least 20,000 eligible voters. These associations must collect and submit the required number of signatures to register their candidate. In 2018, incumbent Sauli Niinistö became the first president elected as a candidate of a constituency association, having previously been elected as the candidate of the National Coalition Party. He also became the first president in Finland to win the election in the first round.

=== 2024 Presidential election ===
An election was last held in 2024, with the first round on 28 January and second round on 11 February. Alexander Stubb won in the second round receiving 51.62% of the votes, facing against independent candidate Pekka Haavisto.

== Parliamentary elections ==
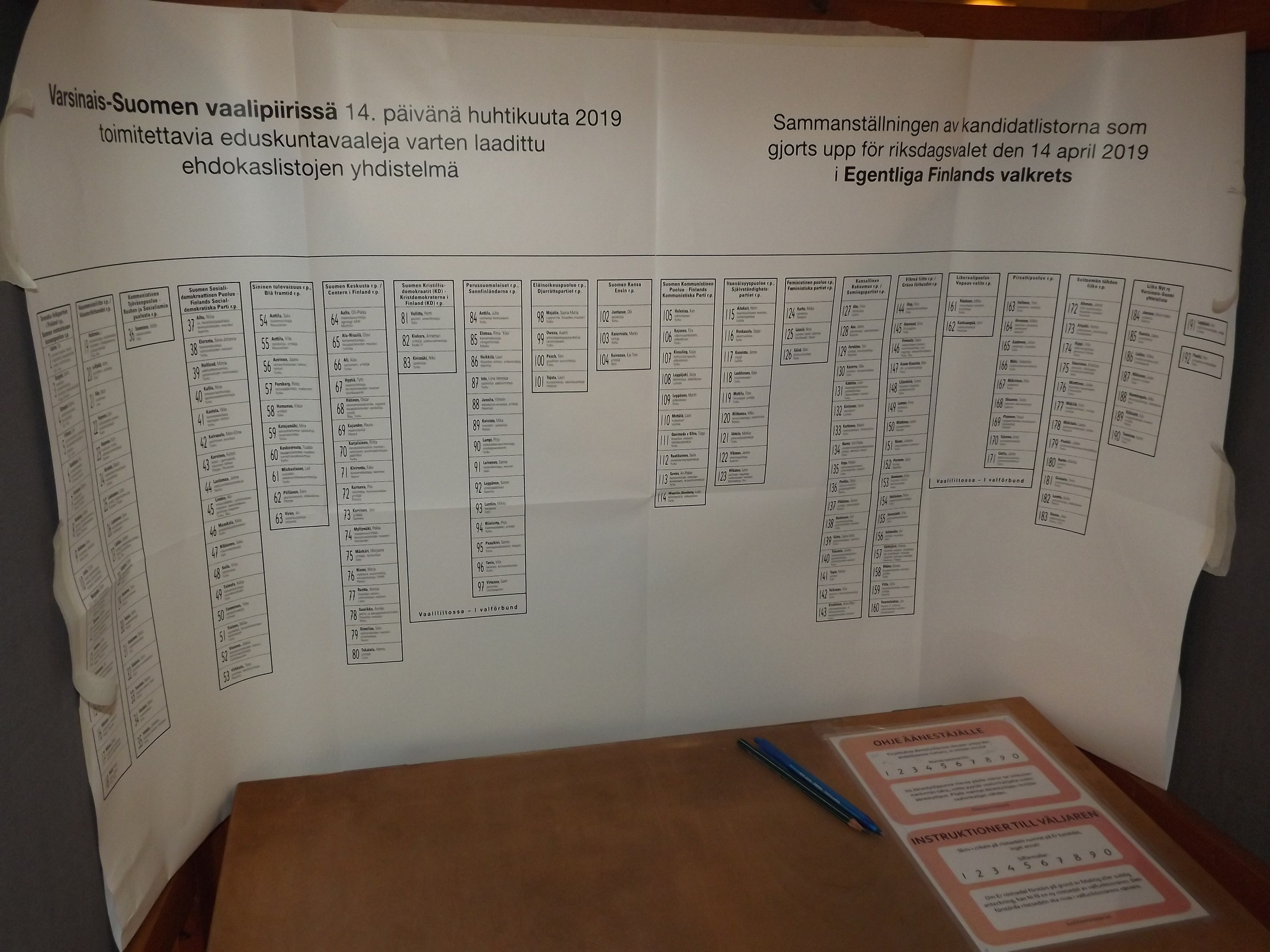
List of candidates, sorted by party, in the voting booth; pencil and instructions on the table

Parliamentary elections in Finland take place every four years to elect the 200 members of the Parliament of Finland. Members are chosen from 13 electoral districts, with the number of seats allocated to each district based on population, ranging from 37 seats in Uusimaa to 1 seat in Åland. Elections are typically held on the third Sunday of April in the election year, unless Easter affects the schedule. Under Finland's parliamentary system the prime minister can ask the president to dissolve parliament at any time during its 4-year term, which would result in early elections. The most recent dissolution of parliament took place in 1975.

The D'Hondt method of proportional representation, used in Finland, encourages a multitude of political parties and has resulted in many coalition cabinets. The system, which allocates seats based on party vote shares, tends to favor large, established political parties, although smaller parties also find representation due to the proportional system. In recent elections, around nine parties have won at least one seat in parliament. Unlike many countries, Finland does not impose a fixed nationwide electoral threshold. Instead, the effective threshold varies by district size, making it more challenging for smaller parties to secure seats in districts with fewer available seats.

=== 2023 parliamentary election ===
The National Coalition Party received 20.8% of the vote, securing 48 seats. The Finns Party followed closely with 20.1% of the vote and 46 seats, while the Social Democratic Party received 19.9% of the vote, winning 43 seats. All three parties saw an increase in their share of the vote compared to the previous election, whereas mid-sized and smaller parties saw an overall decline in support.

== Åland's parliamentary elections ==
Åland is a province that accounts for 0.5% of Finland's population, a total population of 27,210. The Åland's autonomous political status under the Act on Åland Autonomy gives the Parliament of Åland legislative powers over a number of areas. Aside from these issues, the state of Finland, represented by the Provincial Governor, is sovereign and residents vote in general parliamentary elections for one representative to the Finnish parliament.

Elections in Åland are held every four years at the same time as municipal elections are held in the Municipalities of Åland. A proportional representation system encourages a multitude of political parties and has resulted in many coalition cabinets. Åland has different political parties than continental Finland.

The Premier of the Government of Åland, Lantråd, is appointed by the speaker of the Parliament, based on the vote in the parliamentary elections. Usually the chairman of the biggest party becomes the next prime minister. In the parliamentary elections on 21 October 2007 there were two dominating parties: the Liberals for Åland got 10 seats, and the Åland Centre got 8 seats, in the 30-seat Lagting. These parties then formed a new cabinet led by Viveka Eriksson.

== Municipal elections ==
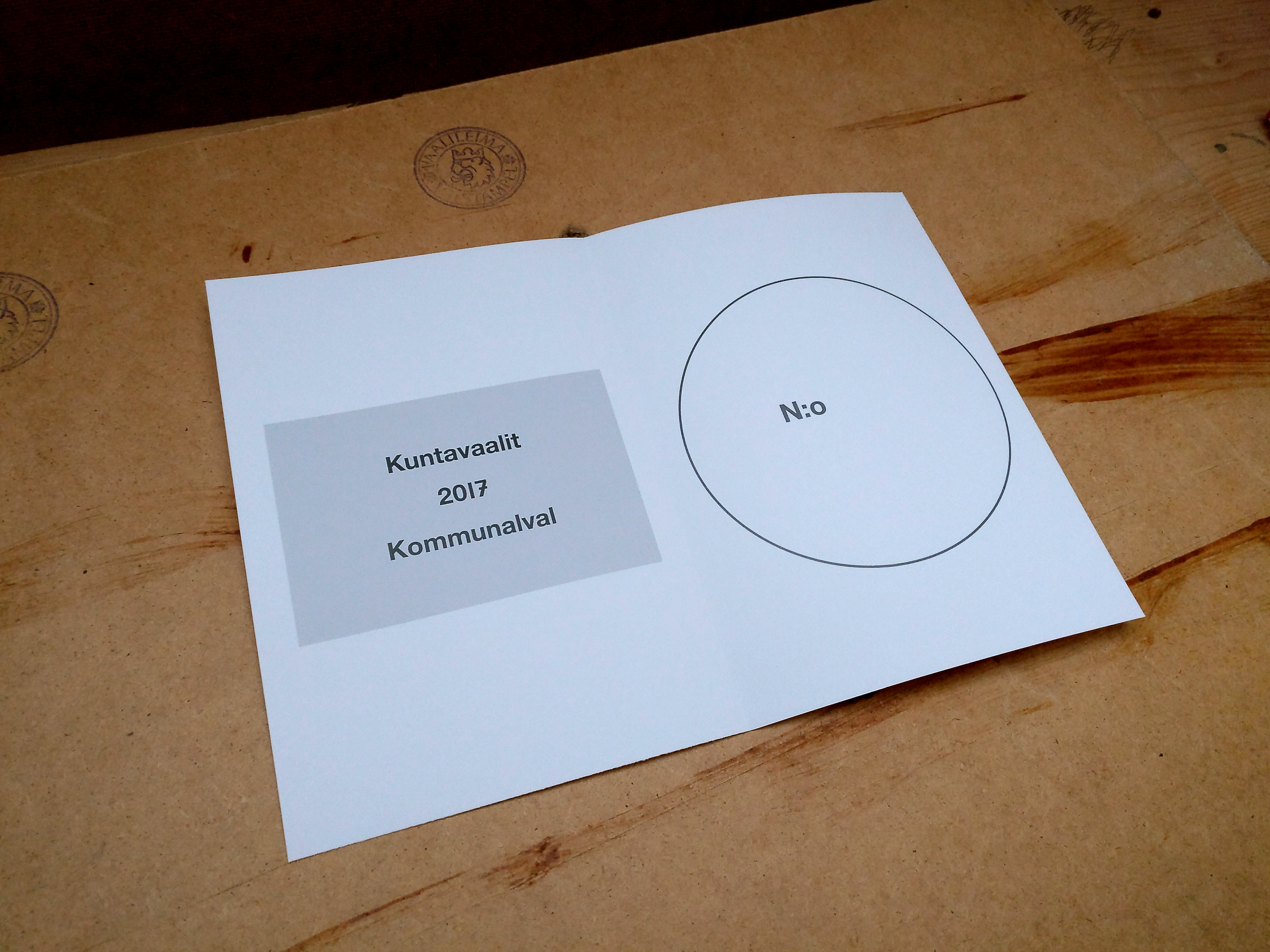
Ballot paper. Just the number of the candidate is to be written on Finnish ballots. Model digits are included in the instructions, to avoid ambiguity and identifiable handwriting. The ballot is valid as long as it is unambiguous and there are no markings that could identify the voter.

Municipalities of Finland, that include cities and other (rural) municipalities, are the basic local administrative units of the country. Most of basic services are provided by the municipality, and are bound to do so by law. Municipalities have council-manager government, where the council (valtuusto) is the highest authority. Every four years, a council is elected.

Councils name a civil servant, the city manager or municipal manager, to conduct day-to-day administration of the municipality. In addition, councils name committees (lautakunta) and a municipal executive board (kunnanhallitus). Councils meet periodically and decide on major issues. The executive board prepares the bills and is responsible for the administration, finances and supervision of the interests of the municipality. Unlike in central government, executive boards usually consist of all parties represented in the council; there is no opposition.

=== 2017 municipal elections ===
Although municipal elections are local only, and local results vary, they do function as a measure of the sentiments and party strengths also nationally. In the 2017 election, National Coalition was the most-voted party, with Social Democrats second and Center the third. Proportionally, the biggest winner was the Green League, whose share of votes rose to 12.5% from 8.5% in 2012 municipal elections. The biggest losers were the Finns Party, whose share of votes dropped to 8.8% from 12.3% in 2012.

== European parliament elections ==
Finland has participated in European parliament elections since joining the European Union in 1995. The first Finnish election was held in 1996. Currently, Finland is allocated 15 seats in the European Parliament, with all seats elected from a single constituency that encompasses the entire country.

=== 2024 European elections ===
Party	Votes	%	Seats	+/–
National Coalition Party	453,636	24.80	4	+1
Left Alliance	316,859	17.32	3	+2
Social Democratic Party of Finland	272,034	14.87	2	0
Centre Party	215,165	11.76	2	0
Green League	206,332	11.28	2	–1
Finns Party	139,160	7.61	1	–1
Swedish People's Party of Finland	112,245	6.14	1	0
Christian Democrats	75,426	4.12	0	0
Freedom Alliance	16,717	0.91	0	New
Movement Now	9,641	0.53	0	New
Liberal Party – Freedom to Choose	7,139	0.39	0	0
Communist Party of Finland	2,815	0.15	0	0
The Open Party	1,273	0.07	0	New
Truth Party	807	0.04	0	New
Total	1,829,249	100.00	15	+1
Valid votes	1,829,249	99.65		
Invalid/blank votes	6,513	0.35		
Total votes	1,835,762	100.00		
Registered voters/turnout	4,546,589	40.38		
Source: Ministry of Justice - Information and Result Service

== County elections ==
In Finland, the councils of the 21 wellbeing services counties are elected every four years in county elections. These counties are responsible for the organization of health, social and rescue services. The county councils hold the highest decision-making authority within their respective counties.

Each wellbeing services county forms a single multi-seat electoral district. While councils can determine the number of elected members, a minimum number of seats is required based on the county's population. Smallest counties are required to have at least 59 councillors, while in the largest counties the minimum number of councillors is 89.

County elections exclude the region of Åland, where wellbeing services are managed by the parliament of Åland, and the city of Helsinki, where they are handled by the municipal council. The first county elections took place in 2022. Beginning in 2025, these elections will be held simultaneously with municipal elections.

== Referendums ==
The Constitution of Finland allows only for a non-binding (consultative) referendum called on by the Parliament (Article 53 of the Constitution).

As of 2013 there have been only two referendums in Finland:

- Finnish prohibition referendum in 1931
- Finnish European Union membership referendum in 1994.

In both cases measures passed, and Parliament acted according to the results of the vote (although the referendum in Finland is non-binding).

Municipal law 30-31 § gives right to Referendum since year 1990. It had been used 56 times between 1990 and 2010. Citizens of Turku collected 15,000 names in one month for referendum against the underground car park. Politicians with in the elections unknown financing from the parking company neglected the citizens opinion. According to International Association of Public Transport UITP parking places are among the most effective ways to promote private car use in the city. Therefore, many European cities have cancelled the expensive underground car parking after the 1990s. The EU recommended actions cover develop guidance for concrete measures for the internalisation of external costs for car traffic also in urban areas. Parking control can only be successful if they are enforceable. In Finland the shops routinely offer free parking for customers which rises the prices of food for all customers, also for those who bicycle or walk.

There were also around 40 municipal referendums in Finland (as of 2006). Most have been about municipal mergers.

If fifty thousand Finnish citizens sign an initiative (for an act or a referendum), the Parliament has to discuss it, but the initiative is not binding, so the parliament does not have to initiate a referendum. This provision entered into force on 1 March 2013, and the first such initiative to reach Parliament was an initiative to ban fur farming, which was rejected by the Parliament. Several other initiatives reached the Parliament in 2013, including "Common Sense in Copyright" initiative, and a gay marriage initiative.

== See also ==
- Government of Finland
- President of Finland
- List of political parties in Finland
- List of political parties in Åland
- Electoral calendar
- Electoral system
