= Elisa Aaltola =

Finnish philosopher and animal rights activist

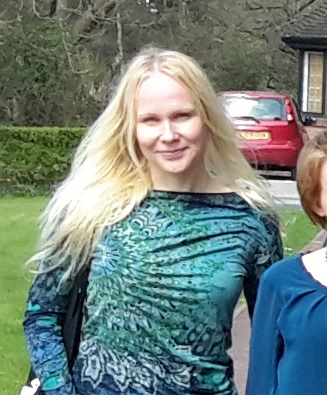
- Aaltola in 2015
- Born: 6 March 1976 (age 50); Petäjävesi, Finland
- Occupation: Philosopher

Elisa Aaltola (born 6 March 1976) is a Finnish philosopher, specialised in animal philosophy, moral psychology and environmental philosophy.

== Career ==
She was a visiting PhD student at the Institute for Ethics, Environment, and Public Policy at Lancaster University and submitted her doctoral thesis to the University of Turku on Animal Individuality: Moral and Cultural Categorisations.

Her book Eläinten moraalinen arvo (Vastapaino 2004) is considered the first commercially published Finnish monograph dedicated solely to animal ethics. She has published 12 books and around 50 peer-reviewed papers on animal philosophy.

Aaltola is a frequent media commentator on animal issues. She is also active on social media. Her accounts, which focus on animal ethics, have around 45 000 followers combined.

Aaltola is an associate professor at the University of Turku and a research fellow at the Turku Institute for Advanced Studies (University of Turku). She also works as the Executive Director of Eläinoikeusakatemia.

== Personal life ==
Aaltola is a vegan. Her brother is Mika Aaltola, is the ex-director of the Finnish Institute of International Affairs and current Member of The European Parliament.

== Books ==
- Esseitä eläimistä. Helsinki: Into, 2022. ISBN 9789523518483.
- Me ja muut eläimet: Uusi maailmanjärjestys (ed. with Birgitta Wahlberg). Tampere: Vastapaino, 2020. ISBN 9789517688147.
- Ihminen kaleidoskoopissa (ed. with Vilma Hänninen). Helsinki: Gaudeamus, 2020. ISBN 9789523450769.
- Häpeä ja rakkaus: Ihmiseläinluonto . Helsinki: Into, 2019. ISBN 9789523511552.
- Varieties of Empathy: Moral Psychology and Animal Ethics. Rowman & Littlefield Int. 2018. ISBN 978-1-78660-612-9.
- Empatia - myötäelämisen tiede (& Sami Keto). Helsinki: Into, 2017. ISBN 978-952-264-822-8.
- Eläimet yhteiskunnassa (toim. Elisa Aaltola & Sami Keto). Helsinki: Into kustannus, 2015.
- Animal Ethics and Philosophy: Questioning the Orthodoxy (ed. Elisa Aaltola & John Hadley). Rowman & Littlefield, 2014. ISBN 9781783481811.
- Johdatus eläinfilosofiaan. Helsinki: Gaudeamus, 2013. ISBN 978-952-495-282-8.
- Animal Suffering: Philosophy and Culture. Basingstone: Palgrave MacMillan, 2012. ISBN 978-0-230-28391-6.
- Animal Individuality: Cultural and Moral Categorisations, 2006. Turku: Turun yliopisto.
- Eläinten moraalinen arvo. Tampere: Vastapaino, 2004. ISBN 951-768-145-3.

== See also ==
- List of animal rights advocates
