= Anu Pentik =

Finnish ceramicist (born 1942)

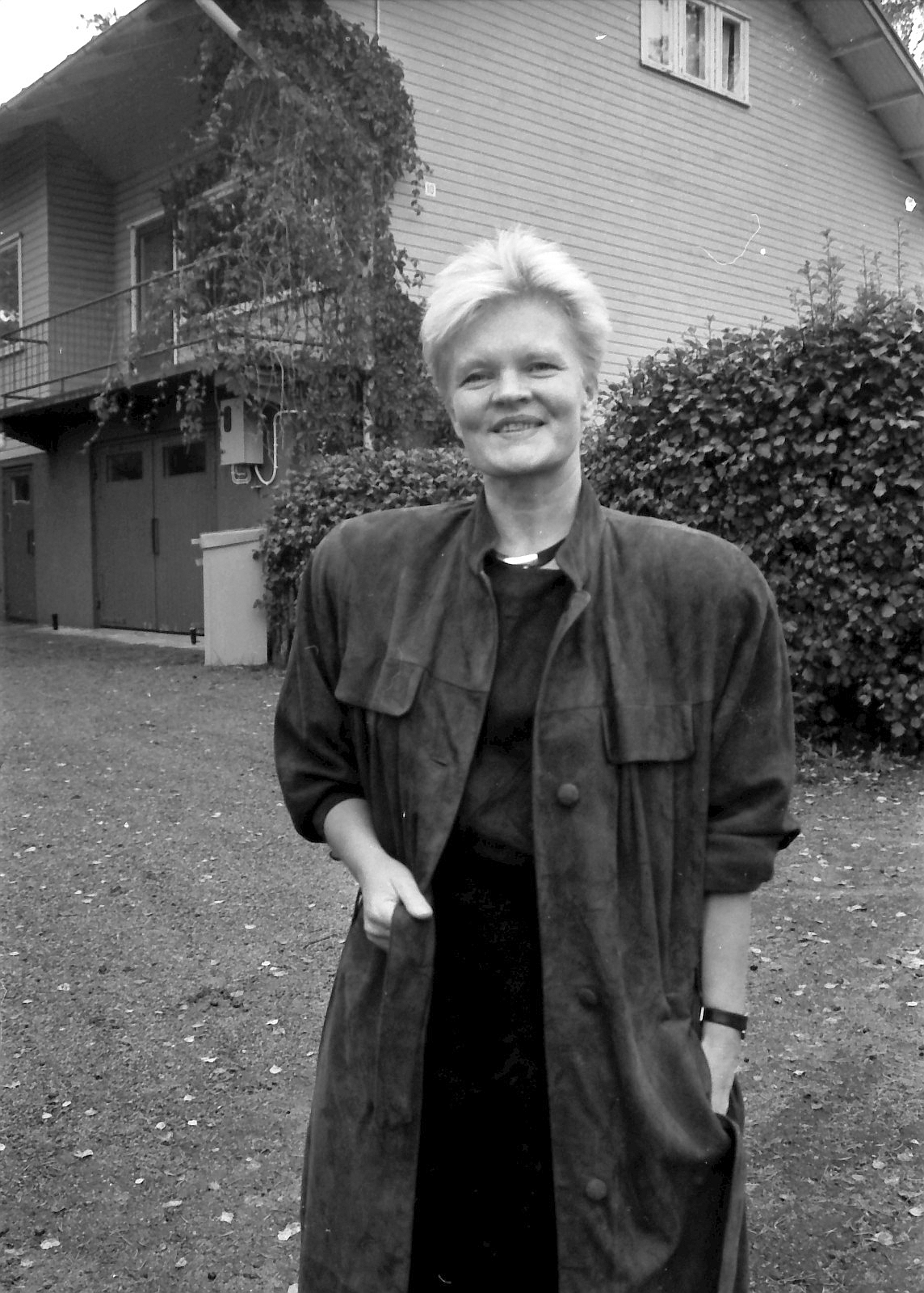
- Pentik in 1987
- Born: Eeva Anneli Pasi; 3 August 1942 (age 82); Kuusankoski, Finland
- Known for: Ceramic design

Eeva Anneli ("Anu") Pentikäinen (née Pasi; born 3 August 1942), better known professionally as Anu Pentik, is a Finnish designer and ceramicist.

== Early life and education ==
Pentik's mother died when she was only six, after which she had to assume responsibility for running the household.

She trained as a home economist (Finnish: kotitalousteknikko), and later as arts & crafts instructor.

Pentik is largely self-taught; pottery-making and leather craft started as her hobbies, before she decided to try her hand at them professionally.

== Career ==
Pentik set up her eponymous ceramics and interior design business Pentik in Posio, Lapland, in 1971, together with her husband Topi Pentikäinen. The first products were sold at the village petrol station.

The first retail store in Helsinki opened five years later, and over the next forty years the business grew to comprise 80 stores in Finland and other Nordic countries, making it one of Finland's leading design businesses. The company is known for its focus on employee well-being, work-life-balance, and flexible work time arrangements. It employs over 300 staff, of whom c. 80% are women.

Pentik has remained throughout the artistic director of the family business, working full time into her late 70s.

== Design ==
Pentik's designs are characterised by warm colours and organic shapes, and have been described as atmospheric.

Her products are designed to be sustainable, safe and long-lasting.

== Exhibitions (selected) ==
In 1993, Pentik co-exhibited alongside her fellow industrial designers Kaija Aarikka and Vuokko Nurmesniemi, in an exhibition titled "Kolme naista, kolme elämäntyötä" (lit. "Three women, three lifeworks") in Ikaalinen.

In 2006, she held her 35-year-retrospective exhibition "Intohimona keramiikka" (lit. "Ceramics as passion") at the Retretti art museum in Punkaharju.

In 2017, Pentik's two-month solo exhibition "Three Rooms" in Kunsthalle Helsinki formed part of the 100th anniversary celebrations of Finland's independence.

In 2020, she held a 50-year-retrospective solo exhibition at the Wäinö Aaltonen Museum of Art in Turku.

== Awards and honours ==
In 2012, Anu Pentik was conferred an honorary doctorate by the University of Lapland's Faculty of Art and Design.

In 2014, she was awarded the Pro Finlandia medal of the Order of the Lion of Finland.

In 2021, Pentik received the Finnish State Prize for Design in recognition of her 50-year-career.
