= Hjallis Harkimo =

Party leader & businessman

Harry Harkimo
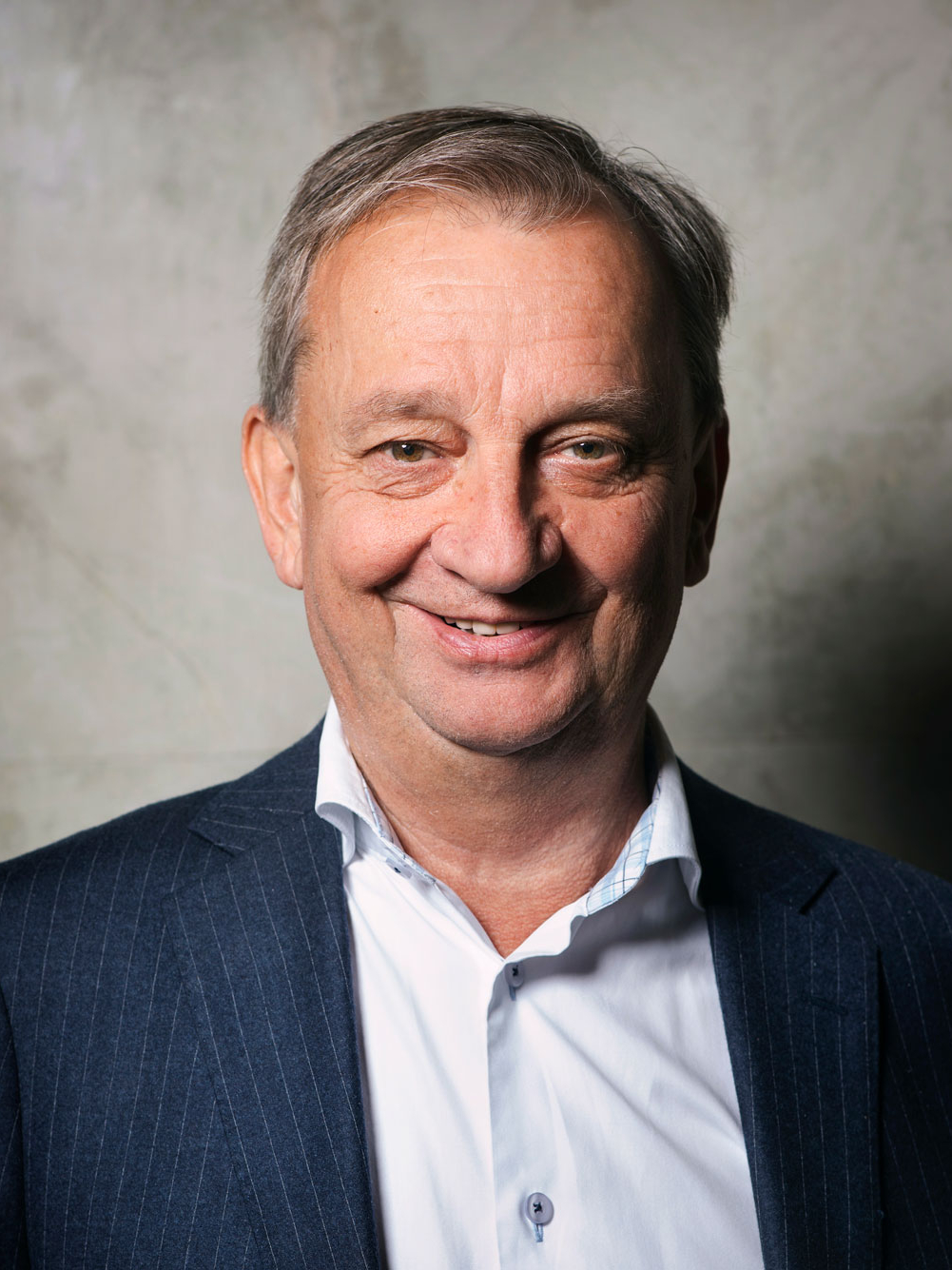
- Harkimo in 2023

Member of the Finnish Parliament
- Incumbent
- Assumed office 22 April 2015
- Constituency: Uusimaa

Chairman of Movement Now
- Incumbent
- Assumed office 21 April 2018
- Deputy: Karoliina Kähönen
- Preceded by: Office established

Personal details
- Born: 2 November 1953 (age 72) Helsinki, Finland
- Party: Movement Now (2018–present)
- Other political affiliations: National Coalition Party (2015–2018)
- Spouse(s): Leena Alamäki (m. 1989; div. 2003) Merikukka Forsius (m. 2004; div. 2005)
- Relatives: Osmo Harkimo (father); Amanda Harkimo (niece)
- Education: Hanken School of Economics
- Occupation: Entrepreneur

Military service
- Allegiance: Finland
- Branch/service: Finnish Army
- Rank: Second Lieutenant

Harry Juhani "Hjallis" Harkimo (born 2 November 1953) is a Finnish businessman, television presenter, and former sailor who has served as a member of the Finnish Parliament since 2015. Previously a member of the National Coalition Party, he left the party over disputes with leadership and founded his own political alliance, Movement Now.

First elected to the Parliament in 2015 representing NCP, his tenure in the party was cut short following his complaints about leadership in 2018. He then proceeded to establish and register his new political movement simply as an association due to strong disdain toward traditional party politics. Following his successful re-election campaign in 2019, Harkimo decided to register Movement Now as a party after all, and said that "the whole system was built so that thriving in it won't be possible without having a party."

In Parliament, Harkimo, who sits in opposition, voted in favor of swearing in the Rinne Cabinet. He later said he wanted to give the government platform a chance, since he considered many of its goals positive. Since then, Harkimo and Movement Now have been more critical of the government, including by joining in on some joint opposition interpellations.

== Sailing ==
In the 1981–82 season Harkimo was a crewmember on the yacht Skopbank of Finland in the Whitbread Round the World Yacht Race.

From 1986 to 1987 he participated in a round-the-world single-handed yacht race, BOC Challenge, and finished third.

In the 1989–90 season he was a crewmember on the yacht Belmont Finland in the Whitbread Round the World Yacht Race.

== Political career ==
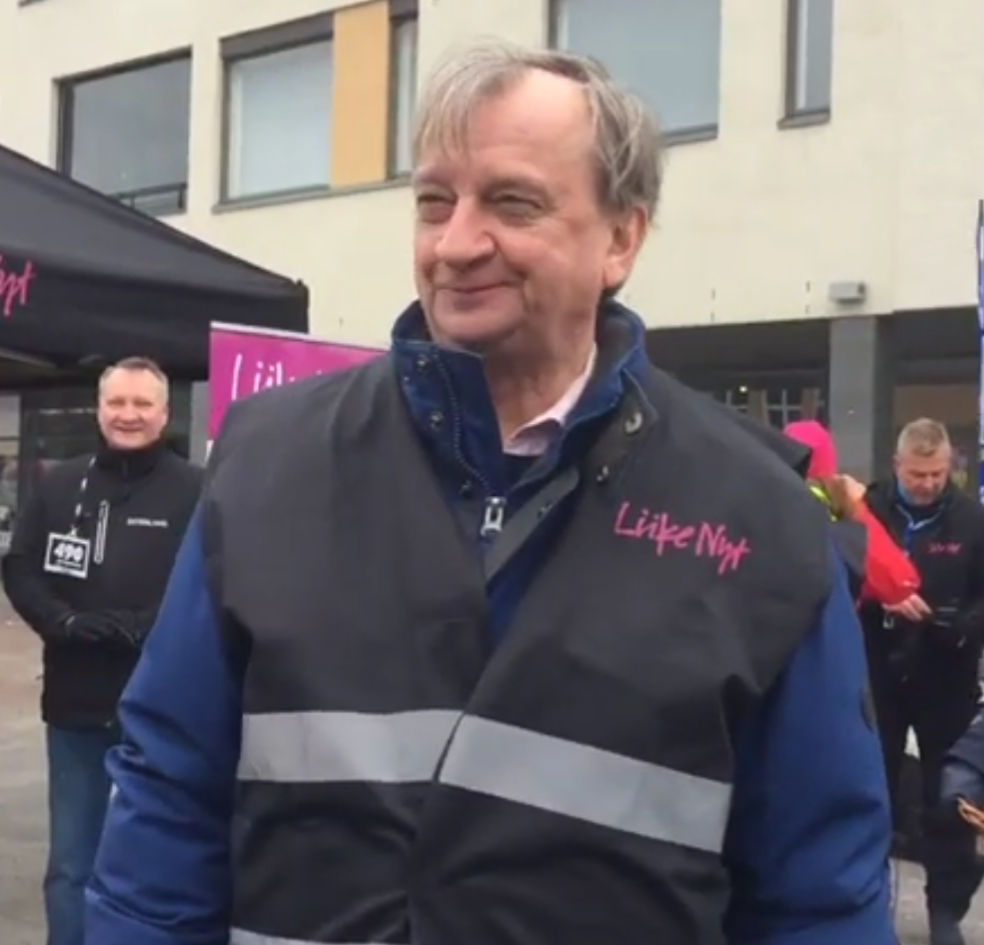
Hjallis Harkimo in 2019

In 1988 Finnish presidential election, Harkimo was Harri Holkeri's constituent.

Harkimo was elected to the Eduskunta in 2015 with 11,416 votes in the election. Although he was elected representing the National Coalition Party, in 2018 he left the party and founded a new political movement, Movement Now. In the 2019 parliamentary election, Harkimo was elected to the parliament as the sole representative from Movement Now.

Harkimo stated in late August 2020 that he was running for Mayor of Helsinki in 2021 Finnish municipal elections

=== Presidential election 2024 ===
In 2022, Harkimo was nominated as the Movement Now candidate for the Finnish presidential election of 2024. In the election, he finished last with 0.5% of the votes.

== Business ==
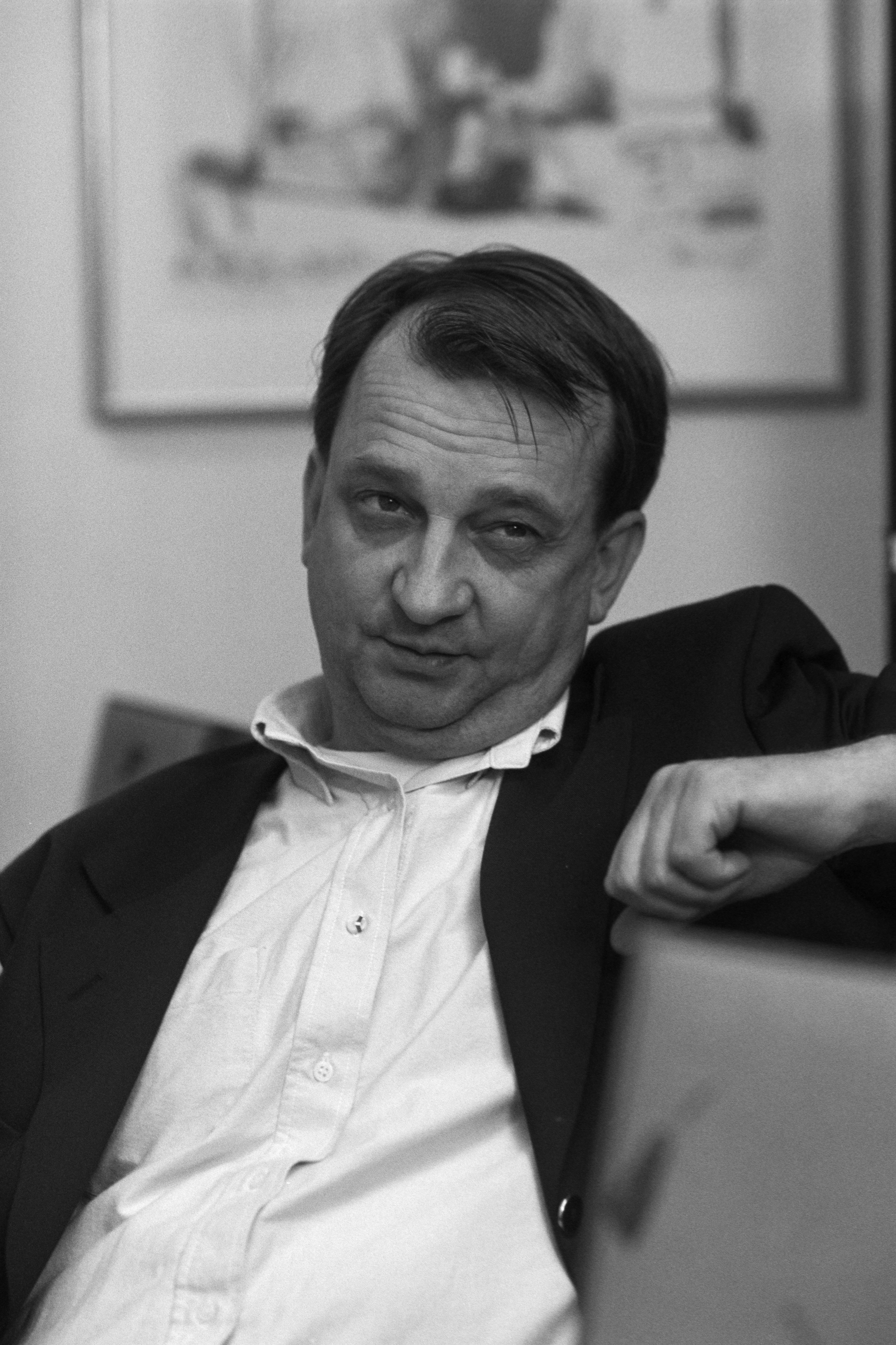
Harry “Hjallis” Harkimo in 1997

Harkimo was the chairman of the board of the Helsinki-based ice-hockey team Jokerit 1991–2019.

Hjallis had been dreaming of his own ice rink since 1994. At that time, the club was playing in the Helsinki Ice Hall together with HIFK, and Harkimo had understood that there would be no continuity in the operations of the Jokerit, if it continued in the same hall. He was a builder and developer of the team's home arena, Hartwall Areena, and had been an investor in sports.

Harkimo shared a common interest with HJK. Hjallis bought the PK-35 and renamed the club FC Jokerit with the aim of attracting Jokerit hockey fans to the football audience as well. Harkimo had experience in stadium construction after leading the Hartwall Arena project, which was completed in 1997. Harkimo raised FIM 64 million in private funding, the City of Helsinki paid 32 million from the budget and the state 14 million, and so the new football stadium began to rise rapidly along Urheilukatu. Töölö football stadium was completed on 10 June 2000, just in time for the opening match between FC Jokerit and HJK. Eventually, HJK acquired the FC Jokerit football operations and formed the reserve team HJK Klubi 04 when, in March 2004, Hjallis Harkimo announced the closure of FC Jokerit.

Harkimo hosted a talk show "With Hjallis" on MTV3. In the program, Harkimo interviewed economic and political figures as well as other public figures.

The first production period of the program was presented from 27 January to 31 March 2011, the second from 8 March to 10 May 2012 and the third from 7 March to 9 May 2013. The fourth season, which was presented from 2 November to 21 December 2013 and the name was changed to "Hjallis". Unlike in the fourth season, there are three guests instead of one. The fifth season of the series was shown from 26 September to 19 December 2014. The sixth production season began on 11 March 2016. In the sixth season, there are two guests in each episode.

In the 2012 presidential election, Harkimo supported the Coalition Party's Sauli Niinistö campaign with 10,000 euros through Hjallis Promotion Oy.

Harkimo hosted the Finnish version of The Apprentice from 2009 until 2013. and made a one-season return in 2018.

In October 2017, Harkimo started to publish YouTube videos, discussing politics, business, sports and other subjects.

In 2019 Harkimo bought the 49% share of Jokerit from Russians Gennady Timchenko and Roman Rotenberg, the owners of Arena Events Oy. Harkimo then sold 100% of Jokerit to Jari Kurri, a long time manager of the club. Harkimo's intent was to exclude the club from the US sanction list drawn upon the annexation of Crimea.

== Personal life ==
Harkimo married his first wife Leena Harkimo, a member of the Parliament of Finland, in 1989. They filed for divorce in 2002. He married ex-member of Parliament Merikukka Forsius-Harkimo in 2004, and they divorced after a year of marriage. Harkimo has two sons from his first marriage and a third from his second marriage.

Harkimo has been a vegetarian since the beginning of 2018.

Preceded by Kalervo Kummola	Winner of the Tapani Mattila memorial trophy 1996–1997	Succeeded by Frank Moberg
