= Jan Store =

Finnish diplomat

Jan Birger Store (born 1 April 1948 Kokkola) is a Finnish diplomat. He served as Finnish Permanent Representative in the European Union in Brussels from 2008 to 2013. Store's duties were also preparing for membership decisions at the Coreper-Committee.

Store worked also at the EU Delegation as a substitute for the Permanent Representative in the European Union from 1995 to 2000.

He has also been Finnish Ambassador to Poland from 2004-2008 and as the Head of Department for European Affairs at the Ministry for Foreign Affairs.

In 2013 Store was awarded the Order of the White Rose of Finland First Class Commander of the White Rose of Finland

After retirement in 2016, Store started to work at the communication and lobbying company Miltton in Brussels where his task is communicating and influencing the EU parliamentarians.

Store is a Master of Political Sciences by education. He graduated from the Åbo Akademi in 1972. He is married and has two adult children.
