= Jaakko Kalela =

Finnish civil servant and ambassador (born 1944)

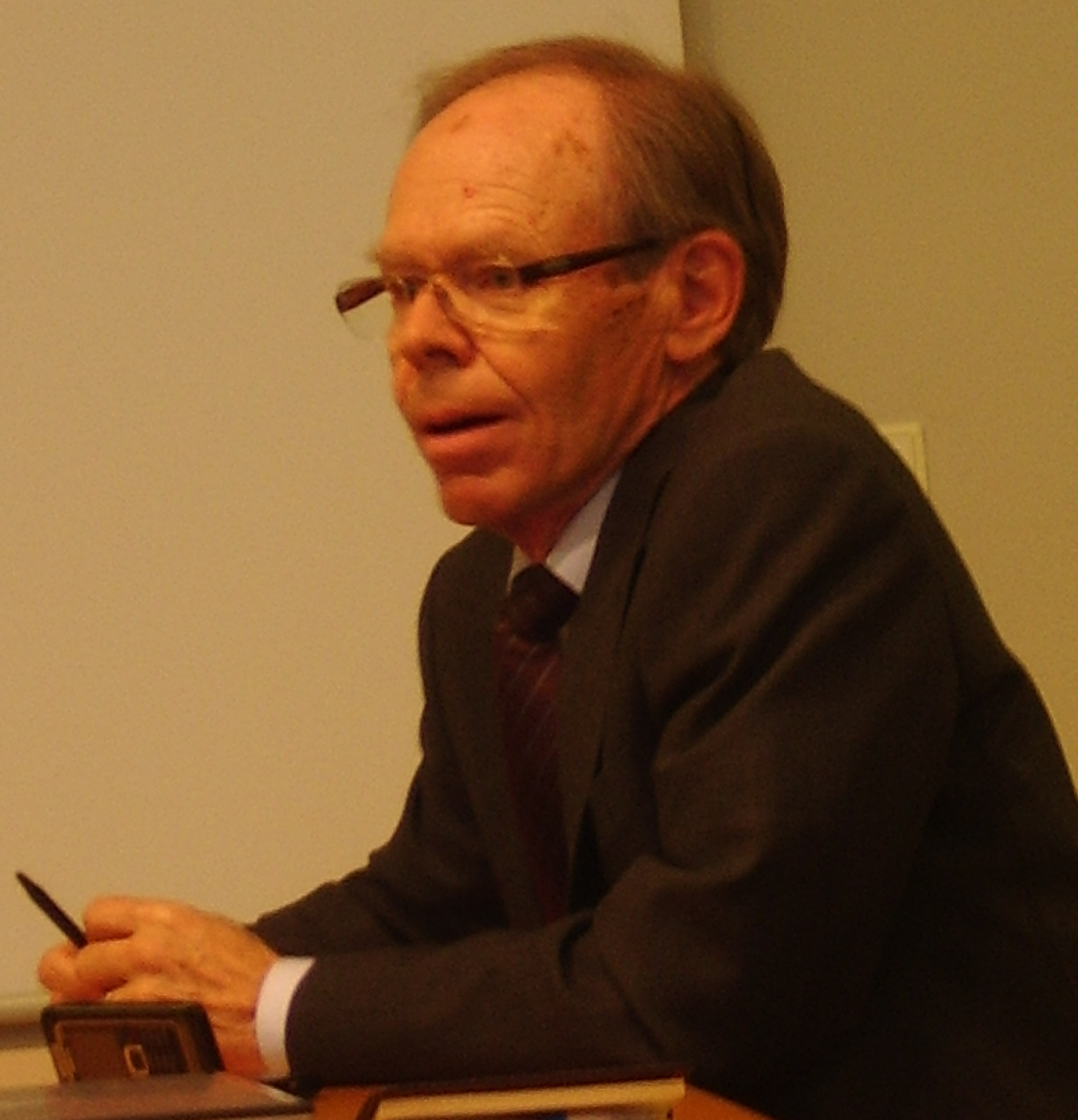
Jaakko Kalela in 2009

Jaakko Kalela (born 24 January 1944, in Helsinki) is a Finnish civil servant and ambassador. He worked for 33 years as Assistant to the President of the Republic (first Foreign Policy Adviser, later Permanent Secretary) and moved as Ambassador to Tallinn in 2005.

Jaakko Kalela's grandfather was Prime Minister Aimo Cajander.
