= Tuomas Enbuske =

Finnish radio and television presenter and journalist (born 1977)

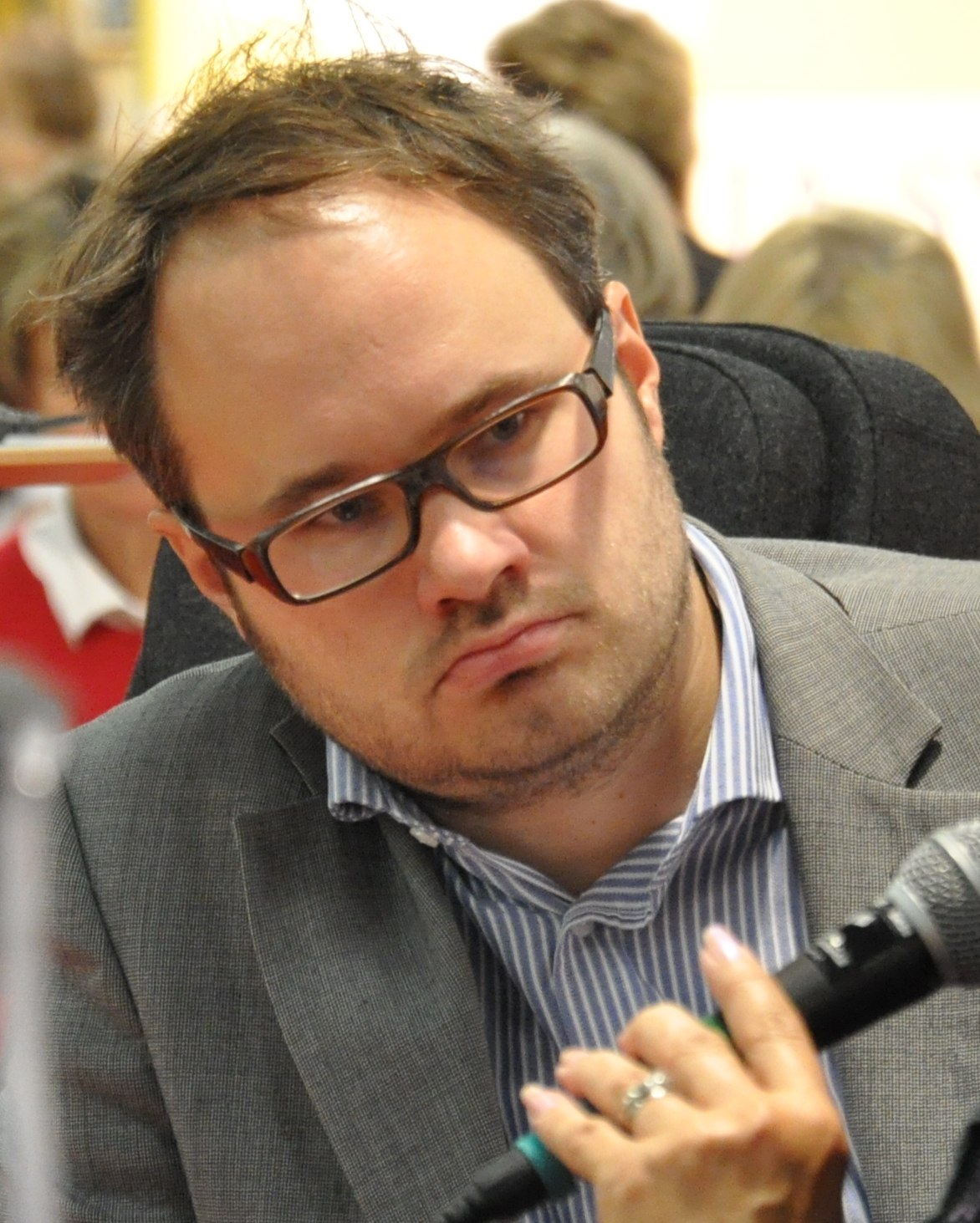
- Tuomas Enbuske at the Helsinki Book Fair 2009.
- Born: Tuomas Ville Juhana Enbuske; 22 September 1977 (age 49); Oulu, Finland
- Occupations: Broadcaster; journalist

Tuomas Ville Juhana Enbuske (born 22 September 1977) is a Finnish radio and TV presenter and journalist.
