= Tapani Brotherus =

Finnish diplomat (born 1938)

Tapani Kaarle Heikinpoika Brotherus (born 12 June 1938) is a Finnish diplomat who was acting as Finnish Chargé d'affaires in Chile during the 1973 coup d'état led by General Augusto Pinochet. Brotherus saved hundreds of Chilean dissidents from death during the coup.

== Early life ==
Tapani Brotherus was born in Copenhagen, Denmark, into a Helsinki-based family. His grandfather K. R. Brotherus (1880–1949) was Professor of Political Science and Rector of the University of Helsinki. Tapani's father, Heikki Brotherus (1909–1985) was a diplomat and author.

== Chilean coup of 1973 ==
General Augusto Pinochet deposed Socialist President Salvador Allende on 11 September 1973. Following the coup, the junta killed at least 3,000 people and captured tens of thousands of Chileans.

At the time of the coup, the 35-year-old Brotherus was the Chargé d'affaires in Santiago, having previously served as a trustee before. During the Allende administration, Finland cooperated extensively with Chile in the forest and mining sectors. Brotherus and Deputy Counselor Ilkka Jaamala's work was based on a secret decision made by them to act against the official guidelines of Foreign Ministry and Finnish asylum policy. They channeled aid by organizing refugees from the country. It is estimated that Brotherus was able to take 182 Chileans to Finland and 1,700 to East Germany, and that by the improvisation of Brotherus he was able to secure about 500 refugees. Brotherus' "balance" was up to 2,500 rescued people.

Matti Tuovinen, Head of the Political Department of the Ministry of Foreign Affairs and other ministry officials tolerated Brotherus's activities. After five years in Chile, Brotherus' career continued as an ambassador in Tehran, Iran, Islamabad, Pakistan, Pretoria, South Africa, and Athens, Greece.

After his retirement, Brotherus has continued human rights and solidarity work with free civic activities. He was awarded the Tammisaari Medal of the People's Education Fund in 2010. The Finnish state recognized Brotherus’ work in Chile by Foreign Minister Alexander Stubb in the form of coffee and a bun.

== In popular media ==
The Finnish-Chilean drama series Invisible Heroes, released in 2019, tells the story of Brotherus and Jaamala's activities in Chile in 1973. Brotherus is played by Pelle Heikkilä.
