= Petri Tuomi-Nikula =

Finnish diplomat (born 1951)

Petri Tuomi-Nikula (born 12 January 1951) is a Finnish diplomat. He has been the Ambassador of Finland to Italy, Malta and San Marino from 2010 to 2015. Since the beginning of 2016, he has been the Finnish Ambassador to Hungary and Slovenia.

Tuomi-Nikula is a Master of Political Science from the University of Helsinki, specializing in political history. His spouse is Merja Tuomi-Nikula (née Pörhö), a specialist doctor in gynecology and childbirth. His brother is Jorma Tuomi-Nikula.

== Career ==
From 2005 to 2010, Tuomi-Nikula was the Head of the Communications and Culture Department of at the Ministry for Foreign Affairs. He has served as a press and cultural officer in Finnish missions in Bonn, Vienna and London

He served as the Secretary General during the First EU Presidency of Finland from 1996 to 2000 and as Secretary General of the International Advisory Board from 1989 to 2000. He was Chairman of Finland Promotion Board from 2005 to 2010 and has been a member of the Country Brand Delegation led by Jorma Ollila.

In 1980 Tuomi-Nikula launched MTV3's Ten O'Clock news. Before that, he worked as a journalist at the Finnish News Agency and in the Vaasa magazine. From 2000 to 2003 he served as the Communications and Marketing Director at the Fujitsu Finland.

== Other positions ==
Tuomi-Nikula is a founding member of the Pro Opera Association and Chaired the Board the Association in the 1990s. He has been Chairman of the Finnish Museum Association, a Member of the Savonlinna Opera Festival since 2009 and Chairman of the Board of the Funding Fund for Fulbright Scholarships in Finland 2005–2010.
