= Isak Otto Andersson =

Finnish politician

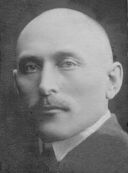

Member of the Parliament of Finland
- In office 1919–1922

Personal details
- Born: 10 April 1881 Munsala, Finland
- Died: 16 September 1925 (aged 44)
- Political party: Social Democratic Party of Finland
- Occupation: farmer and politician

Isak Otto Andersson (10 April 1881 in Munsala – 16 September 1925) was a Finnish farmer and politician. He was a member of the Parliament of Finland from 1919 to 1922, representing the Social Democratic Party of Finland (SDP).
