= 2018 Finnish presidential election =

- 28 January 2018
- Turnout: 66.76%
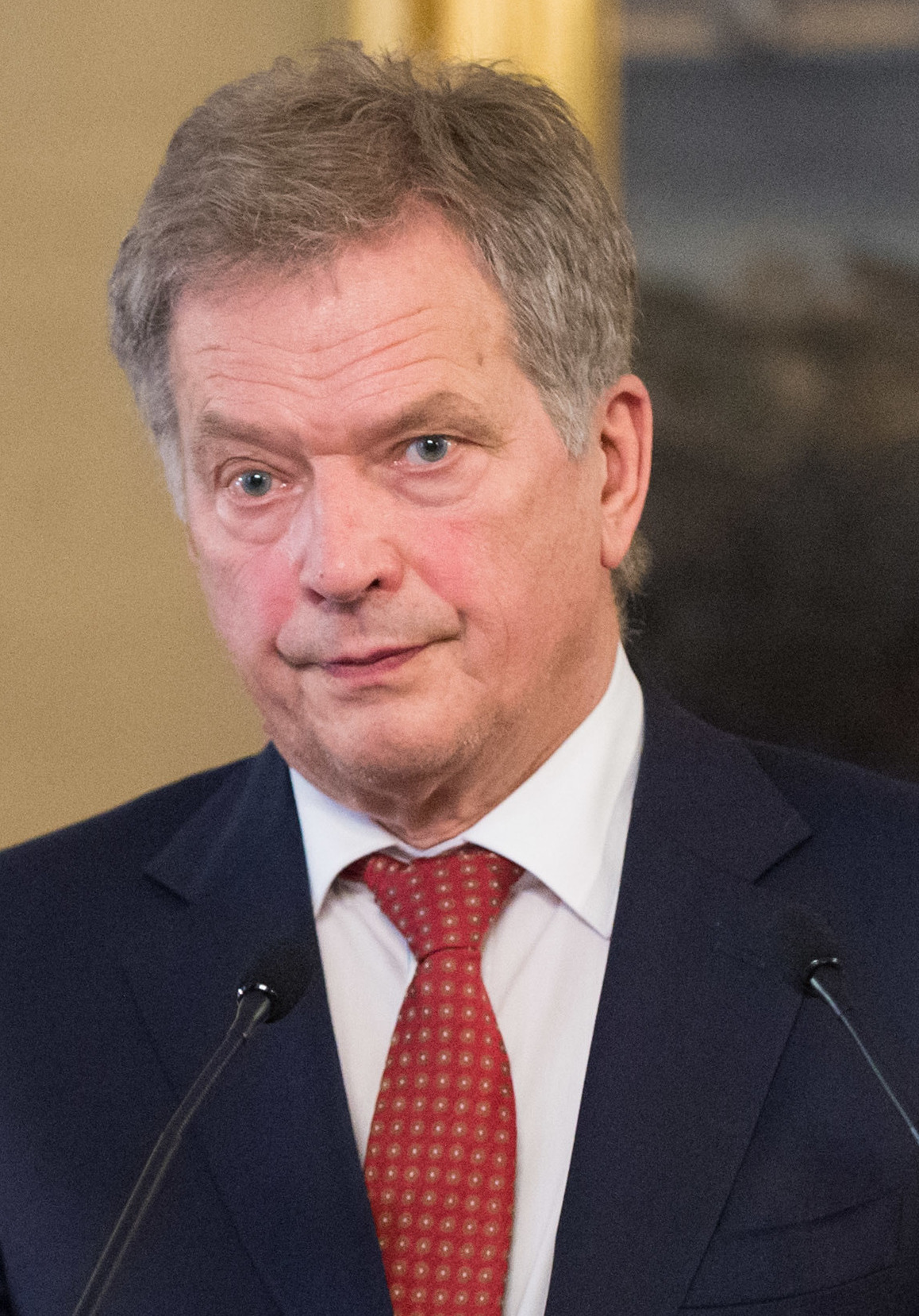

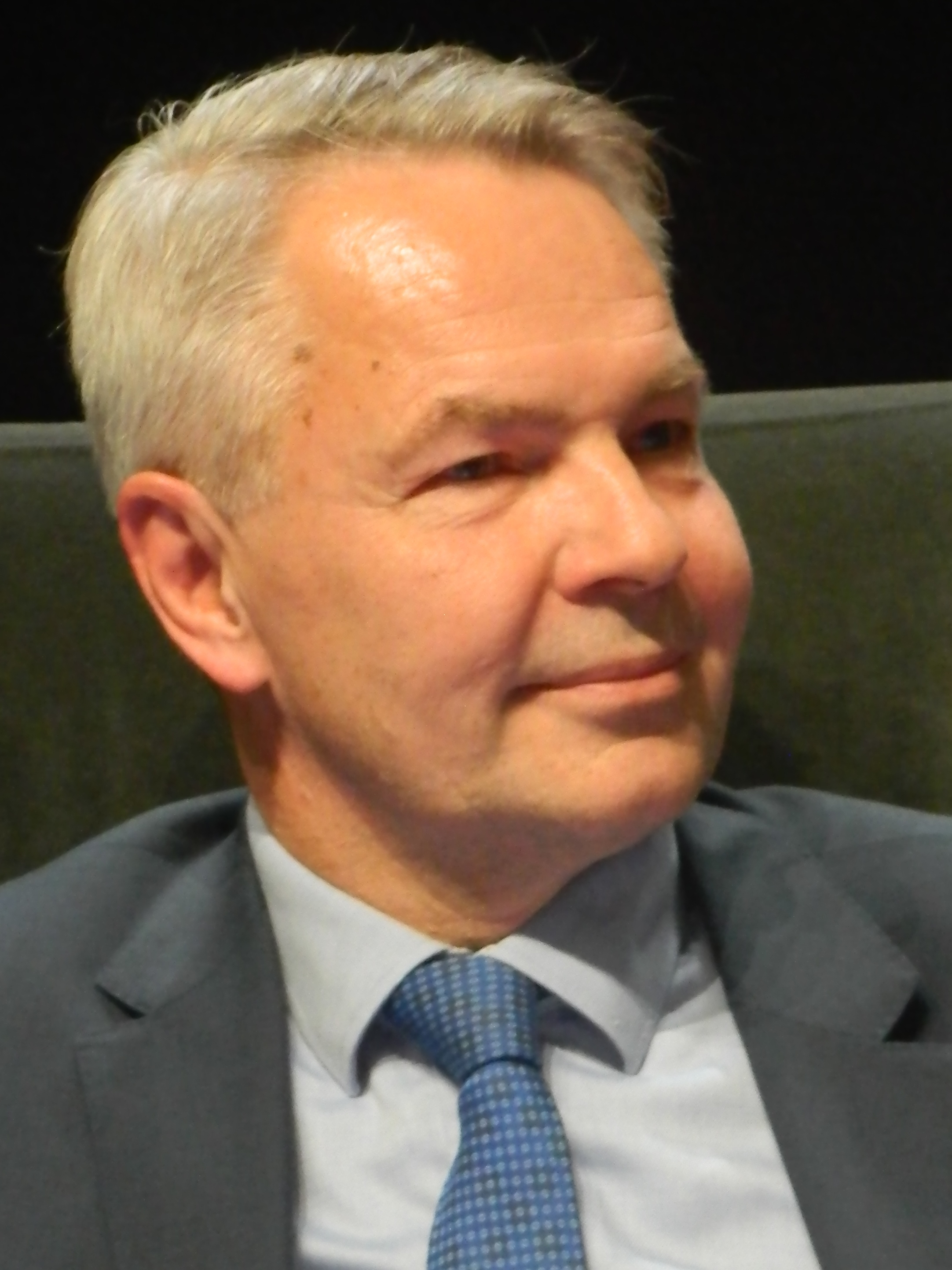

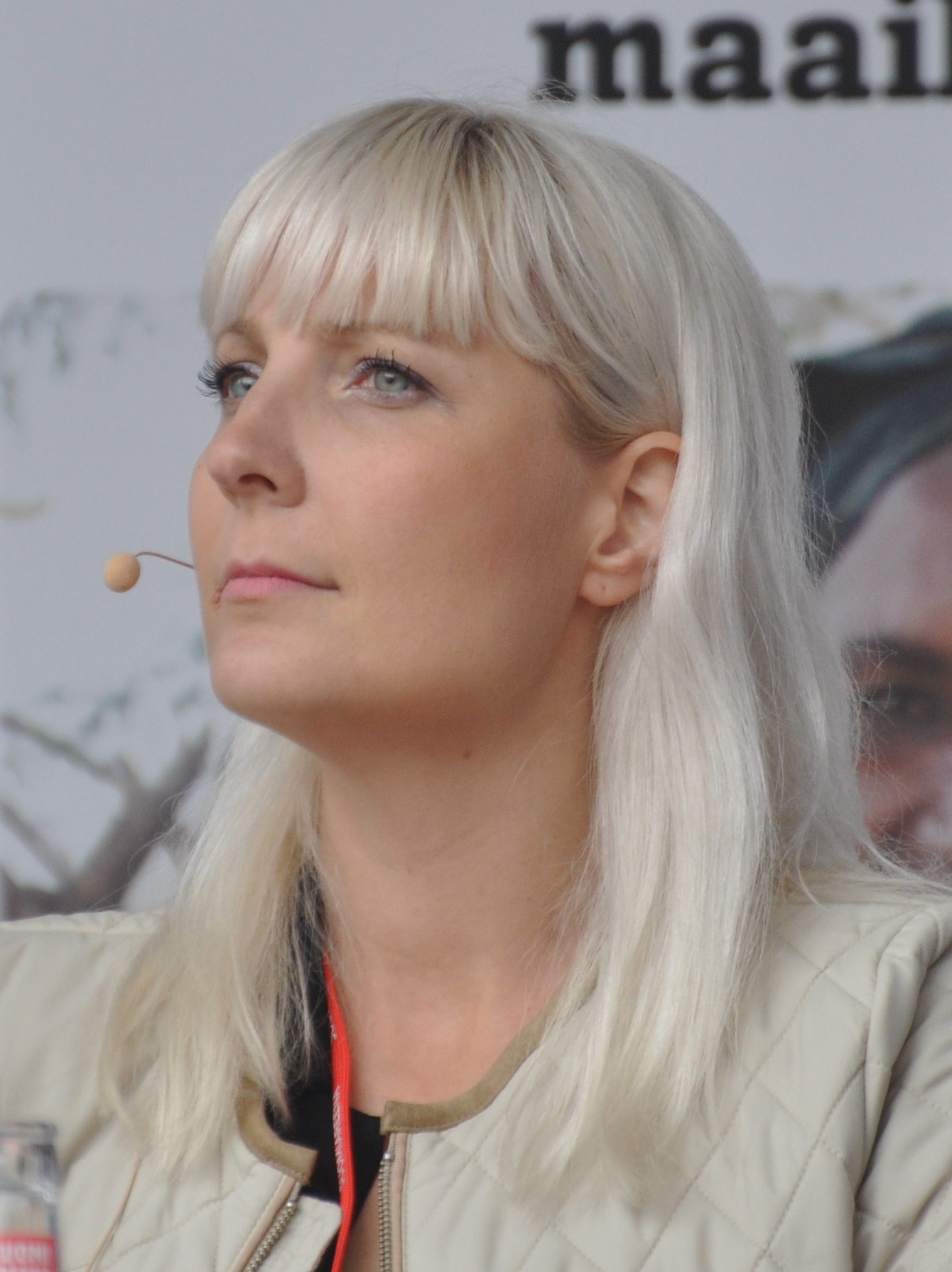

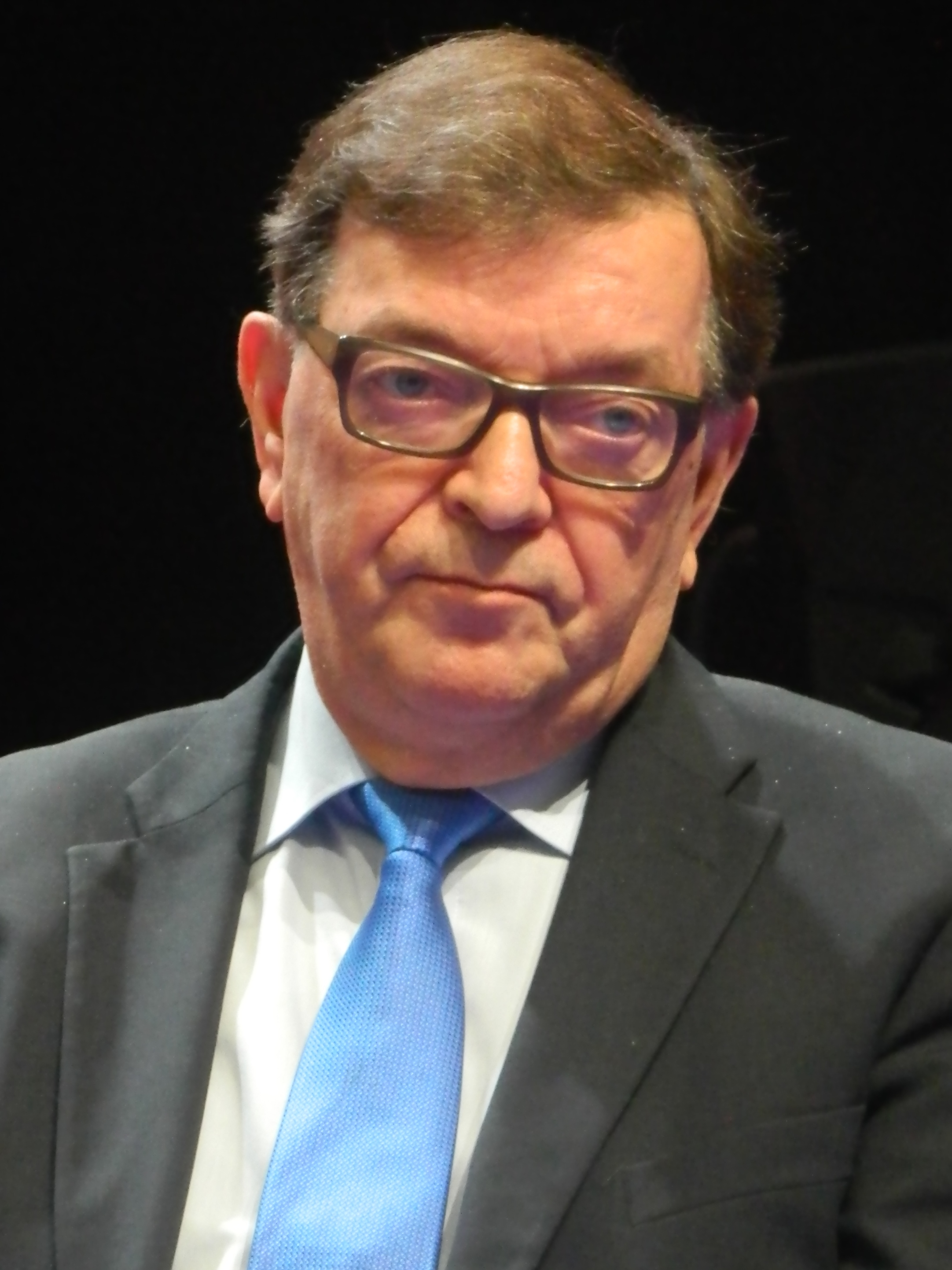
Candidate	Sauli Niinistö	Pekka Haavisto
Party	Independent	Green
Popular vote	1,875,342	371,254
Percentage	62.64%	12.40%
Candidate	Laura Huhtasaari	Paavo Väyrynen
Party	Finns	Independent
Popular vote	207,337	185,305
Percentage	6.93%	6.19%
- Niinistö: 40–45% 45–50% 50–55% 55–60% 60–65% 65–70% 70–75% 80–85%
President before election
Sauli Niinistö
National Coalition
Elected President
Sauli Niinistö
Independent

Presidential elections were held in Finland on 28 January 2018. The incumbent Sauli Niinistö received 63% of the vote and was re-elected for a second term, avoiding a second round. He received a plurality of the vote in every municipality and a majority in all but 13 municipalities.

Niinistö's second term was from 1 February 2018 to 1 March 2024.

== Candidates ==
=== Confirmed candidates ===
Candidate name and age, political party		Political office(s)	Campaign logo	Details
Tuula Haatainen (57); Social Democrats	Tuula Haatainen	MP for Helsinki (1996–2007, since 2015) Other offices: Minister for Education from 2003 to 2005; Minister for Social Affairs and Health from 2005 to 2007		Haatainen was minister for education in the short-lived Jäätteenmäki Cabinet and retained her post in the subsequent Vanhanen I Cabinet. After that she was Minister for Social Affairs and Health from 2005 to 2007.
Pekka Haavisto (59); Greens	Pekka Haavisto	Minister for International Development (2013–2014); MP for Helsinki (1987–1995, since 2007) Other offices: Minister of the Environment and Development from 1995 to 1999; Chairman of the Green League from 1993 to 1995		Haavisto ran in the 2012 presidential election and reached the second round of voting, but lost to Sauli Niinistö of the National Coalition Party. Prior to the campaign he had been an MP since 2007, and had worked for the United Nations from 1999 to 2005.
Laura Huhtasaari (38); Finns	Laura Huhtasaari	MP for Satakunta (since 2015)	Logo of Laura Huhtasaari	Huhtasaari was elected to the Parliament in 2015 with 9,259 votes, and was elected vice chair of the Finns Party in June 2017. In the Parliament, she also has been member of the Legal Affairs Committee, the Education and Culture Committee and the Finnish Delegation to the Nordic Council.
Merja Kyllönen (41); Left Alliance	Merja Kyllönen	Minister of Transport (2011–2014) Other offices: MEP for Finland since 2014; MP for Oulu from 2007 to 2014	Logo of Merja Kyllönen	Kyllönen served as minister of transport in the Katainen Cabinet from 2011 to 2014. She ran for the European Parliament in 2014 and was elected.
Sauli Niinistö (69); Independent		President of the Republic of Finland (since 2012); Speaker of the Parliament (2007–2011) Other offices: Minister of Finance from 1996 to 2003; Minister of Justice from 1995 to 1996; Chairman of the European Democrat Union from 1998 to 2002; Deputy Prime Minister of Finland from 1995 to 2001; Chairman of the National Coalition Party from 1994 to 2001; Chair of the City Council of Salo from 1989 to 1992; Chair of the City Council of Salo from 1989 to 1992; MP for Turku Province South from 1987 to 1999; MP for Helsinki from 1999 to 2003; MP for Uusimaa from 2007 to 2011; Member of the City Council of Salo from 1977 to 1992; Member of the City Board of Salo from 1977 to 1988	Logo of Sauli Niinistö	The incumbent president of Finland ran as a member of the National Coalition Party in 2012 after narrowly losing in 2006. For 2018 he decided to run as an Independent to "test his support" among the public. He gathered 156,000 signatures and his candidacy was confirmed on 25 September.
Nils Torvalds (72); Swedish People's	Nils Torvalds	MEP for Finland (since 2012)	Logo of Nils Torvalds	Former member of the Communist Party of Finland, Torvalds worked at the Swedish-speaking department of the Finnish Broadcasting Company (Yle) from 1982 to 2004. He joined the Swedish People's Party of Finland in 2006 and was elected its third vice chairman in 2007. He ran for European Parliament in 2009 and wasn't elected, but he acceded to the position in 2012 after Carl Haglund resigned.
Matti Vanhanen (62); Centre	Matti Vanhanen	Prime Minister of Finland (2003–2010); Minister of Defence (2003)		Former prime minister ran in 2006 and got 18,6% of the vote. He left politics after his tenure as prime minister, but returned in 2015 when he was re-elected as an MP.
Paavo Väyrynen (71); Independent	Paavo Väyrynen	MEP for Finland (1995–2007, since 2014); Minister for Foreign Affairs (1977–1982, 1983–1987, 1991–1993) Other offices: Minister for Foreign Trade and International Development from 2007 to 2011; Deputy Prime Minister of Finland from 1983 to 1987; Minister of Labour from 1976 to 1977; Minister of Education from 1975 to 1976; MP for Lapland from 2007 to 2011; MP for Uusimaa from 1991 to 1995; MP for Lapland from 1970 to 1991	Logo of Paavo Väyrynen	Veteran politician Väyrynen has run for president as a Centre Party candidate three times; in 1988, 1994, and 2012. He quit the Centre Party in 2016 and founded his own Citizens' Party.

=== National Coalition Party ===
The incumbent president Sauli Niinistö was elected as the candidate of the National Coalition Party in the 2012 election. He was eligible for re-election and his decision for running again was closely followed throughout the latter half of his first term. On 29 May 2017, Niinistö announced that he would seek support for his candidacy as an independent candidate outside party politics. To become an official candidate, Niinistö needed 20,000 signatures from his supporters. Niinistö eventually gathered 156,000 signatures and his candidacy was confirmed on 25 September.

Soon after Niinistö's announcement, the leader of the National Coalition Party Petteri Orpo tweeted that Niinistö had the party's full support.

=== Centre Party ===
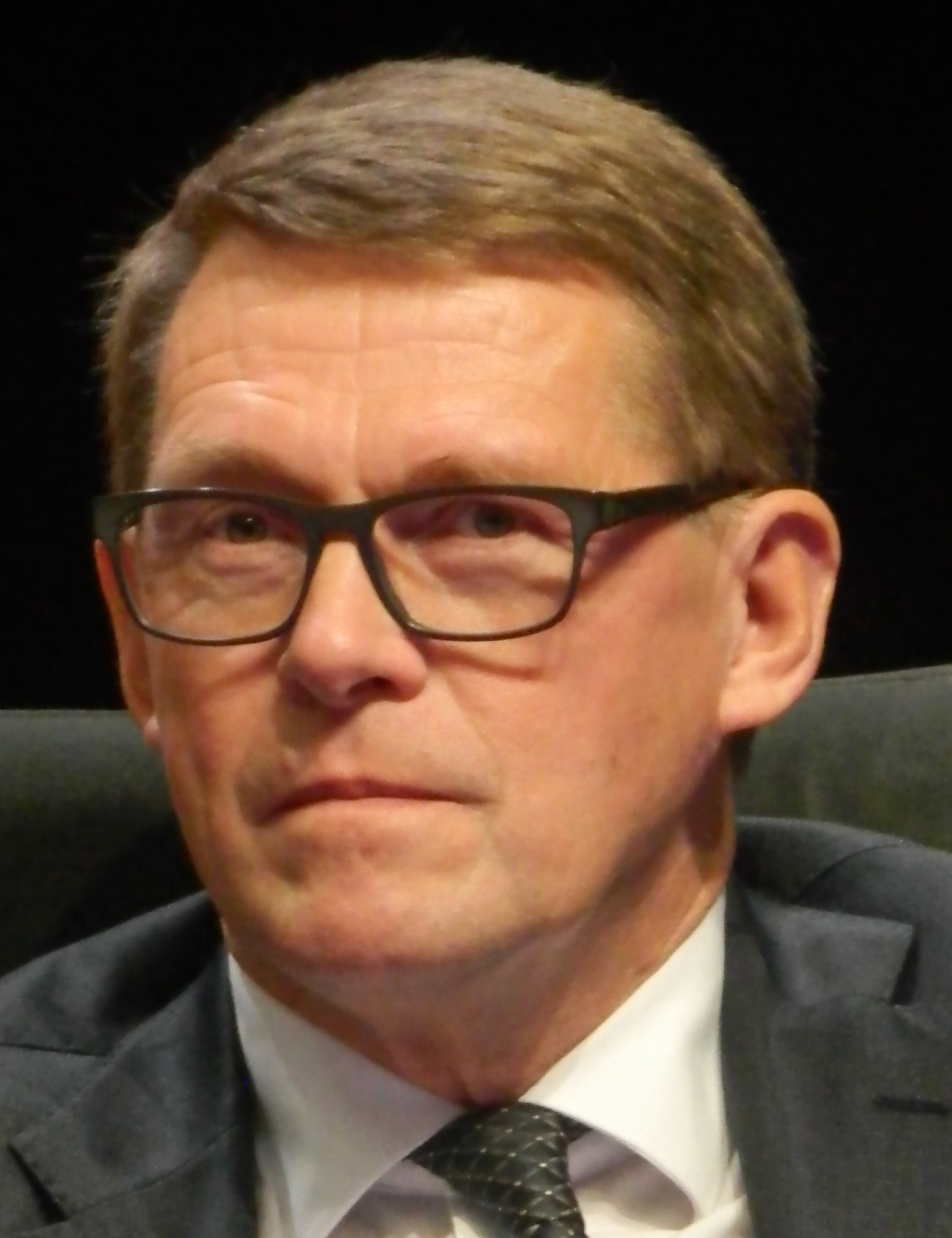
Former prime minister Matti Vanhanen was the Centre Party's candidate

The Centre Party decided on 30 November 2015 that the party would choose their presidential candidate already in June 2016. Soon after, former prime minister and Centre Party's presidential candidate in 2006 election, Matti Vanhanen, announced that he would run for candidacy. Prime Minister Juha Sipilä declined his interest early on. Other prominent names in speculations for the candidacy were the former prime ministers Esko Aho and Anneli Jäätteenmäki, and former minister of Economic Affairs Olli Rehn. Rehn declined the possibility stating that it wouldn't be possible to combine his duties as cabinet minister with campaigning. Aho did not comment his interest in candidacy, but it was considered unlikely for him to seek presidential nomination, as he was a candidate for the supervisory board of Sberbank at the time. Jäätteenmäki, an incumbent vice president of the European Parliament, said running for president was "not on her agenda".

As no challengers appeared till the deadline of 11 May, Vanhanen was the sole candidate in June's party congress and was confirmed as the Centre Party's candidate in the presidential election. Vanhanen said that his candidacy was motivated by the support he felt he had around the country during his last campaign and the will to improve the security situation in the areas surrounding Finland.

=== Finns Party ===
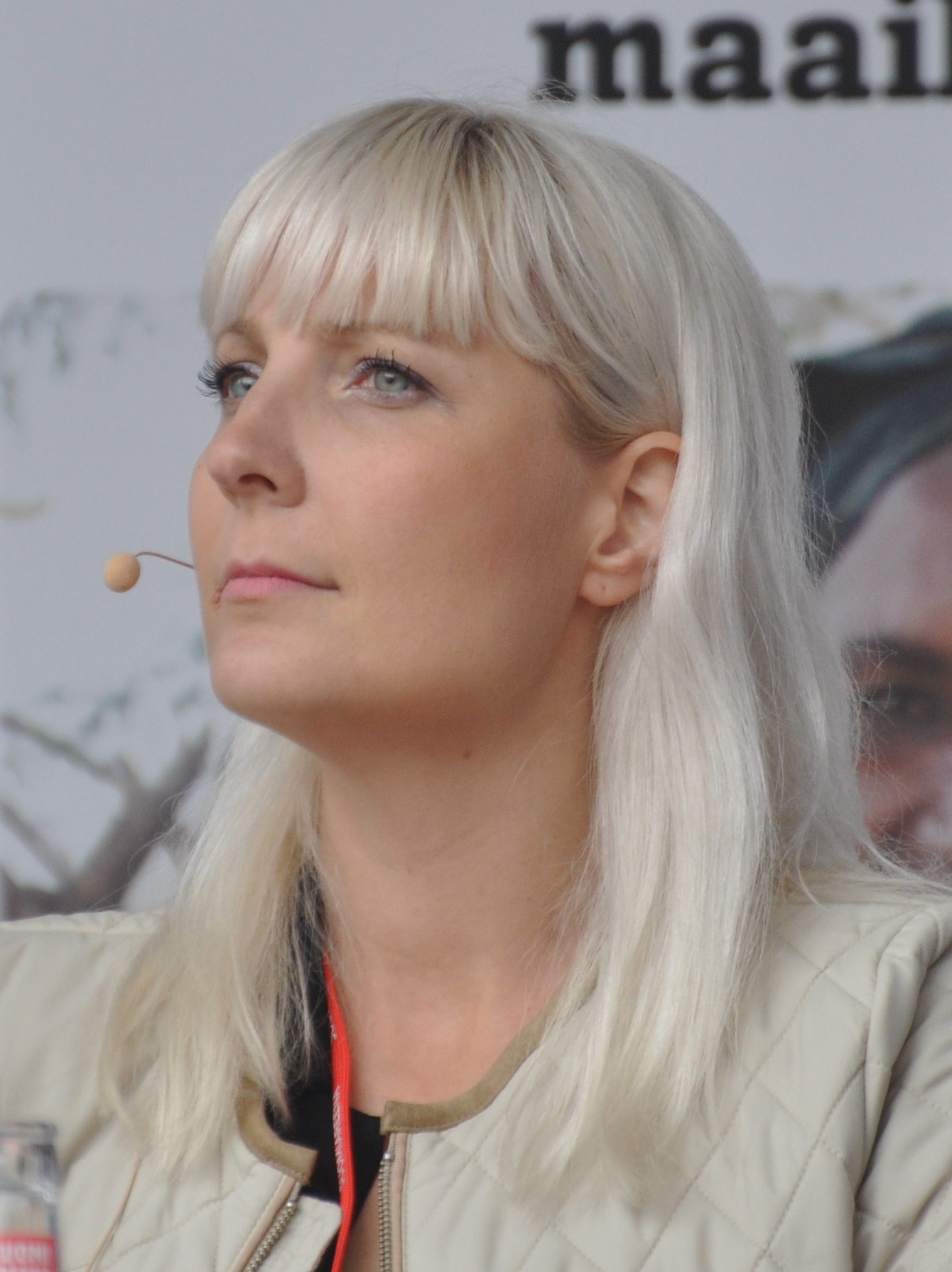
Finns Party MP Laura Huhtasaari was nominated as the party's candidate

The Finns Party was expected to confirm their candidate in the summer of 2017. The leader of the Finns Party Timo Soini announced early on in November 2014 that he would not seek candidacy in the 2018 presidential election, after getting 3,43 % and 9,4 % of votes in 2006 and 2012 presidential elections respectively. He reaffirmed his decision in April 2016, encouraging party to move on and inviting new faces to enter party's primaries. As Soini had been a strong face for the Finns Party, his decision sparked much speculation on the party's decision, as party's presidential candidate was expected to also follow Soini as the chairman.

In March 2017 Soini announced that he would not seek another term as the leader of the party. Soon after, the chairman of the parliamentary group Sampo Terho announced that he would seek chairmanship and, if elected, also presidential candidacy. Member of the European Parliament Jussi Halla-aho, Minister of Defence Jussi Niinistö and Speaker of the Parliament Maria Lohela did also express their interest in candidacy, while Minister of Justice and Labor Jari Lindström declined early on. However, only Halla-aho decided to also seek chairmanship in the leadership election.

Choosing the presidential candidate for the party was on the agenda for party congress in June 2017. However, after Jussi Halla-aho won the leadership election, the decision was postponed by Halla-aho's request. A few days after the leadership election, twenty Finns Party MPs, including all cabinet ministers, defected to form a new parliamentary group under the name New Alternative. After the split, most of the potential presidential candidates had left the party. However, the newly elected vice-chairman Laura Huhtasaari and MP Tom Packalén announced that they were thinking about the candidacy.

On 4 August 2017 Halla-aho announced that the board of the Finns Party had chosen Huhtasaari as the presidential candidate of the party, and her candidacy was confirmed by the party council on 23 September.

=== Blue Reform ===
On 19 June 2017 Sampo Terho announced that a new party would be formed based on the New Alternative parliamentary group under the name Blue Reform. The vice-chair of the Blue Reform parliamentary group Tiina Elovaara stated initially that the group was likely to have their own presidential candidate. However, as the party was formed after the previous parliamentary election and thus had no elected MPs, it would have required to gather a sufficient number of signatures to set an own candidate. Thus, ultimately, the party decided not to put forth their own candidate and neither did it formally back any running candidate.

=== Green League ===
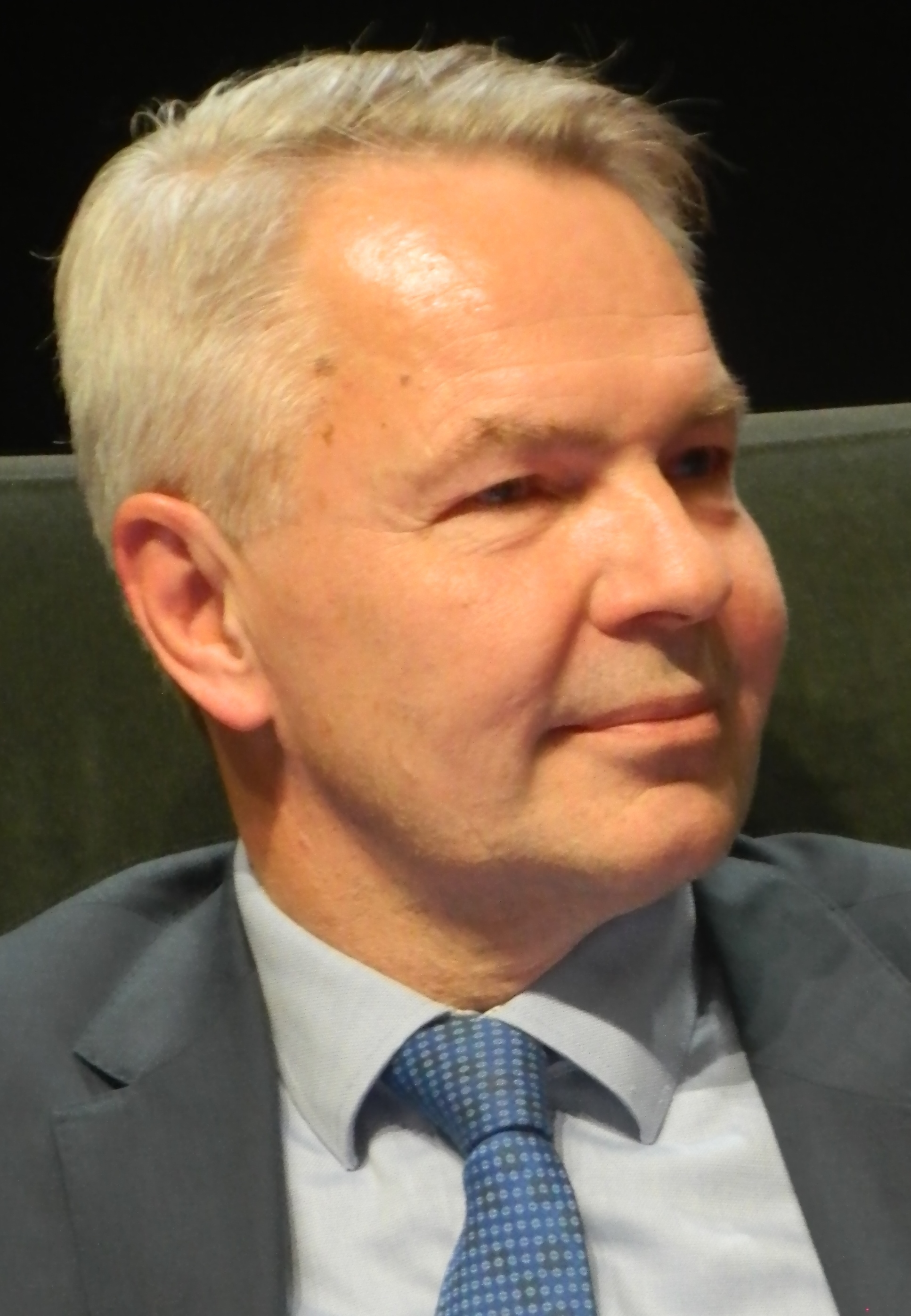
The 2012 presidential candidate for Green League, Pekka Haavisto, reprised his candidacy

The party's 2012 presidential candidate, Pekka Haavisto, announced in February 2017 that he will reprise his candidacy. The decision came after Haavisto had been approached multiple times by the Green Party. Previously the party leader Ville Niinistö, President Niinistö's nephew, had stated that he would not seek the candidacy. Haavisto was confirmed as the party's candidate on 12 February.

=== Left Alliance ===
The Left Alliance chose MEP Merja Kyllönen as the party's candidate on 18 March 2017, after being the only one interested in running. Former leader of the party Paavo Arhinmäki was also interested in running early on, but later decided to concentrate on running for the office of Mayor of Helsinki.

=== Social Democratic Party ===
Social Democratic Party organised an informal membership poll in August 2017 for electing the party's presidential candidate, with three candidates entering the race, MPs Maarit Feldt-Ranta, Tuula Haatainen and Sirpa Paatero. The final decision based on the membership poll was made on 2 September 2017, when it was revealed that Haatainen had received the most votes in the poll. Haatainen ultimately gained 48.6% of the votes against Feldt-Ranta's 42.3% and Paatero's 8.6%.

Before Feldt-Ranta, Haatainen and Paatero entered the party primary, Social Democratic Party was struggling to find potential candidates, as most of the prominent politicians had declined the candidacy. From early on, there was speculation on two possible candidates, Eero Heinäluoma and Jutta Urpilainen. In June 2016, Heinäluoma announced that he would not seek presidency due to his wife's recent death and ongoing work in the Parliament. In February 2017, Urpilainen also announced she would not seek presidency. The leader of the party Antti Rinne, the governor of the Bank of Finland Erkki Liikanen and MEP Liisa Jaakonsaari likewise announced that they were not entering the presidential race. There were also talks within SDP on supporting a candidate outside the party, such as archbishop Kari Mäkinen, if no candidate would be found from within. Prominent SDP figureheads, such as Erkki Tuomioja and Lasse Lehtinen, even suggested the possibility of backing the incumbent president Sauli Niinistö.

=== Swedish People's Party ===
The Swedish People's Party decided to choose their candidate in the party congress in June 2017. As no one else entered the party's primary on 11 June, Member of the European Parliament Nils Torvalds was nominated as the party candidate. In Spring 2016, then leader of the party, Carl Haglund stated that he was thinking about candidacy, but renounced his leadership and left politics later that year.

=== Christian Democrats ===
On 19 August 2017, the Christian Democrats decided to back the incumbent president Sauli Niinistö. It was previously speculated that the leader of the party and former presidential candidate Sari Essayah would run again. However, after Essayah announced that she would not seek the candidacy, the party convention decided to back Niinistö.

=== Väyrynen's candidacy ===
Former Center Party politician and three-time presidential candidate Paavo Väyrynen announced that he would run as an independent candidate if he managed to gather the 20,000 signatures required from his supporters in time. By 26 November, he had gathered around 15,000 signatures. On 5 December, he announced that he had gathered the needed 20,000 signatures.

== Campaign ==
=== Funding ===
The parties budgeted about as much for their campaigns than during the last presidential election in 2012. Ahead of the election, the campaign teams budgeted as follows: Niinistö 1,000,000–1,500,000 euros, Haatainen 550,000 euros, Haavisto and Vanhanen 500,000 euros, Torvalds 400,000 euros, Kyllönen 250,000 euros and Huhtasaari 200,000 euros. Väyrynen didn't leave the notion ahead of the election, but revealed afterwards that his team had collected 162,000 euros for the campaign.

After the election, Niinistö announced that the 300,000 euros that were reserved for the second round would be donated to the charity.

=== Debates ===
The first presidential debate was organised on 30 October 2017 by the Finnish Business and Policy Forum at Finlandia Hall. All confirmed candidates took part, excluding Kyllönen, who was on a business trip. The event marks the earliest moment that an incumbent president had taken part in debates. The debates continued at the University of Helsinki on 13 November, with Vanhanen being absent after being hospitalised for heart arrhythmia. As Väyrynen became an official candidate only in early December, he was not invited to the first three debates and thus the first debate, that gathered all candidates together, was organised on 13 December 2017.

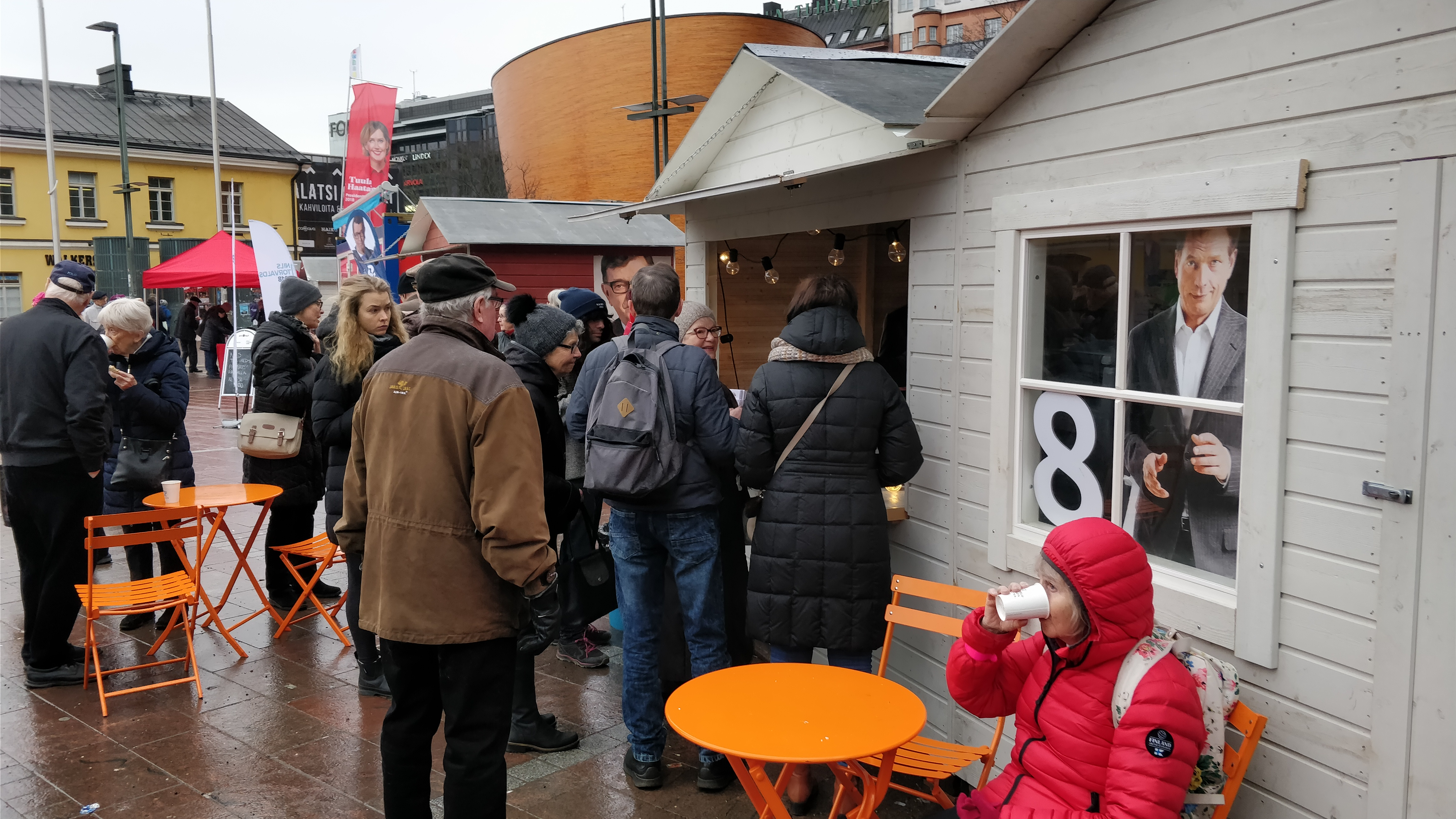
Sauli Niinistö's election campaign in Helsinki

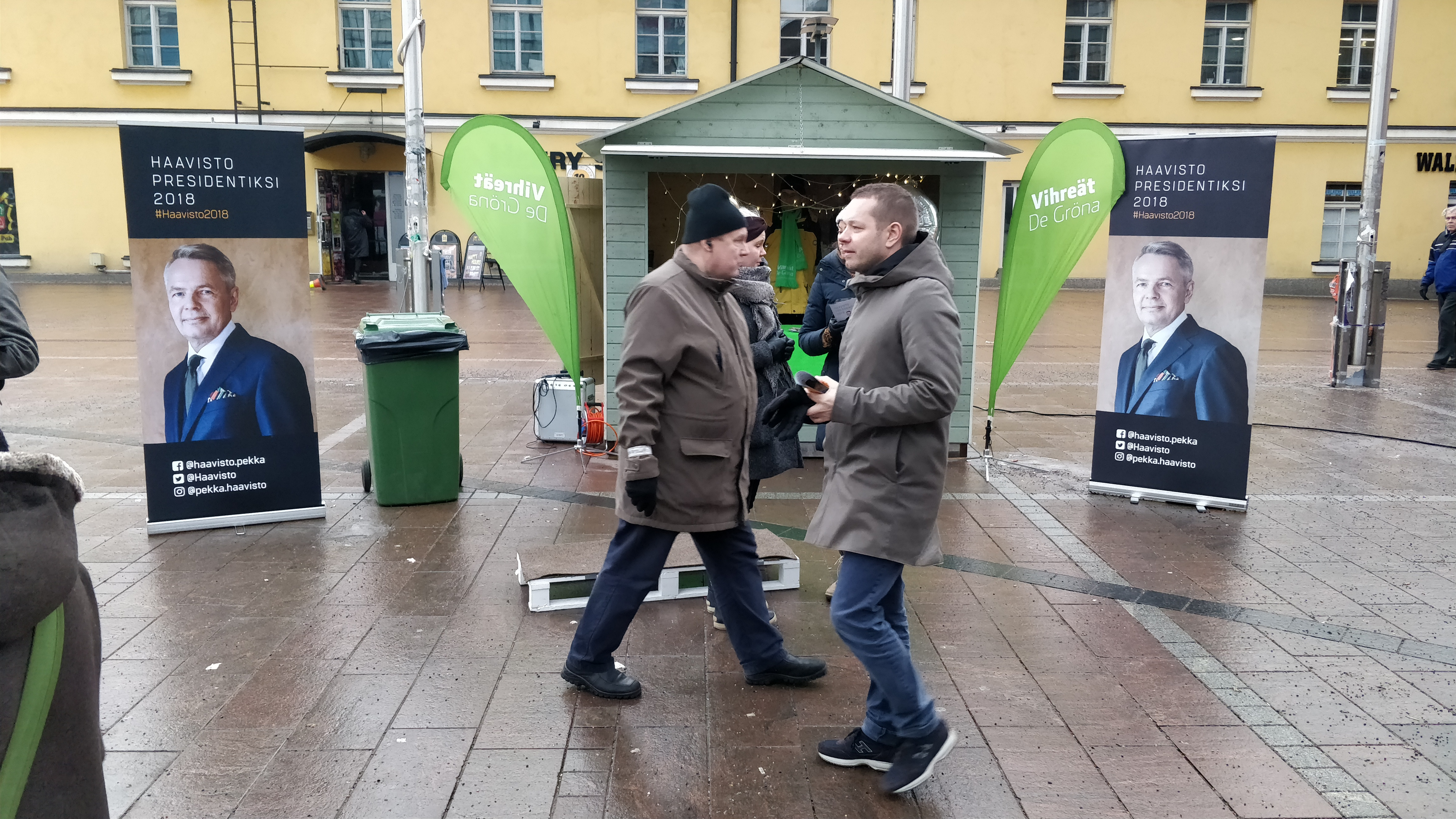
Pekka Haavisto's election campaign in Helsinki

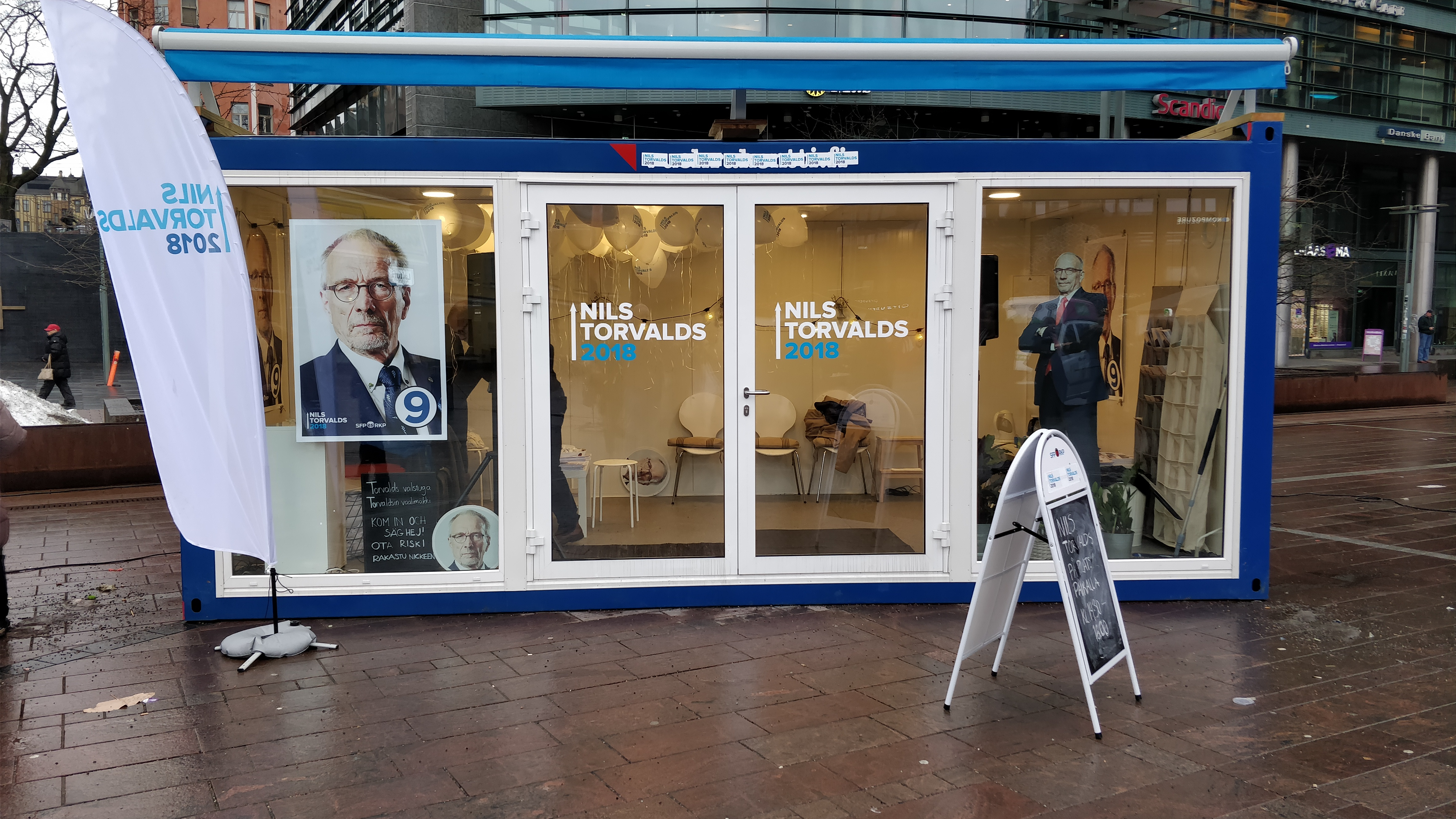
Nils Torvalds's election campaign in Helsinki

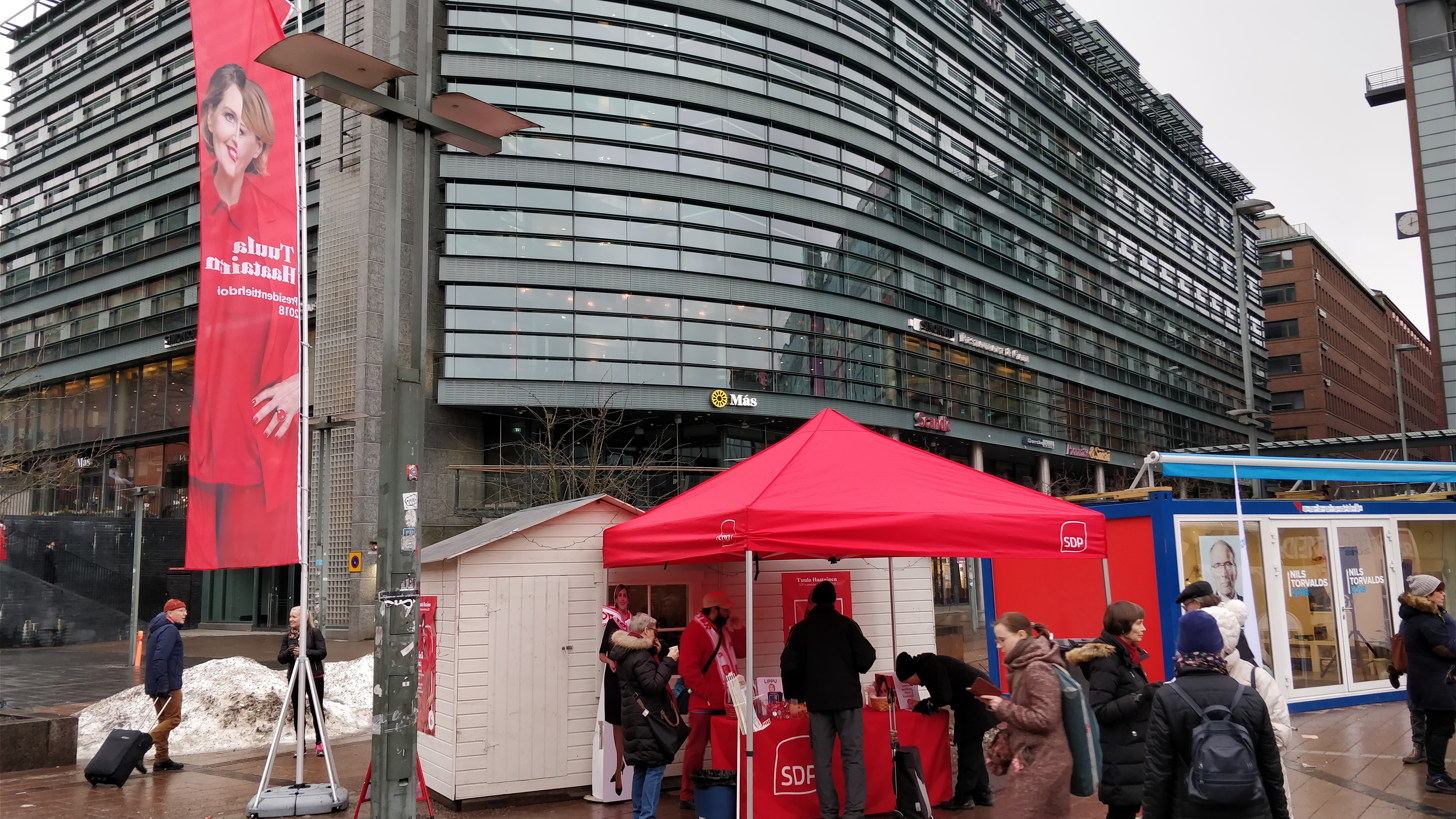
Tuula Haatainen's election campaign in Helsinki

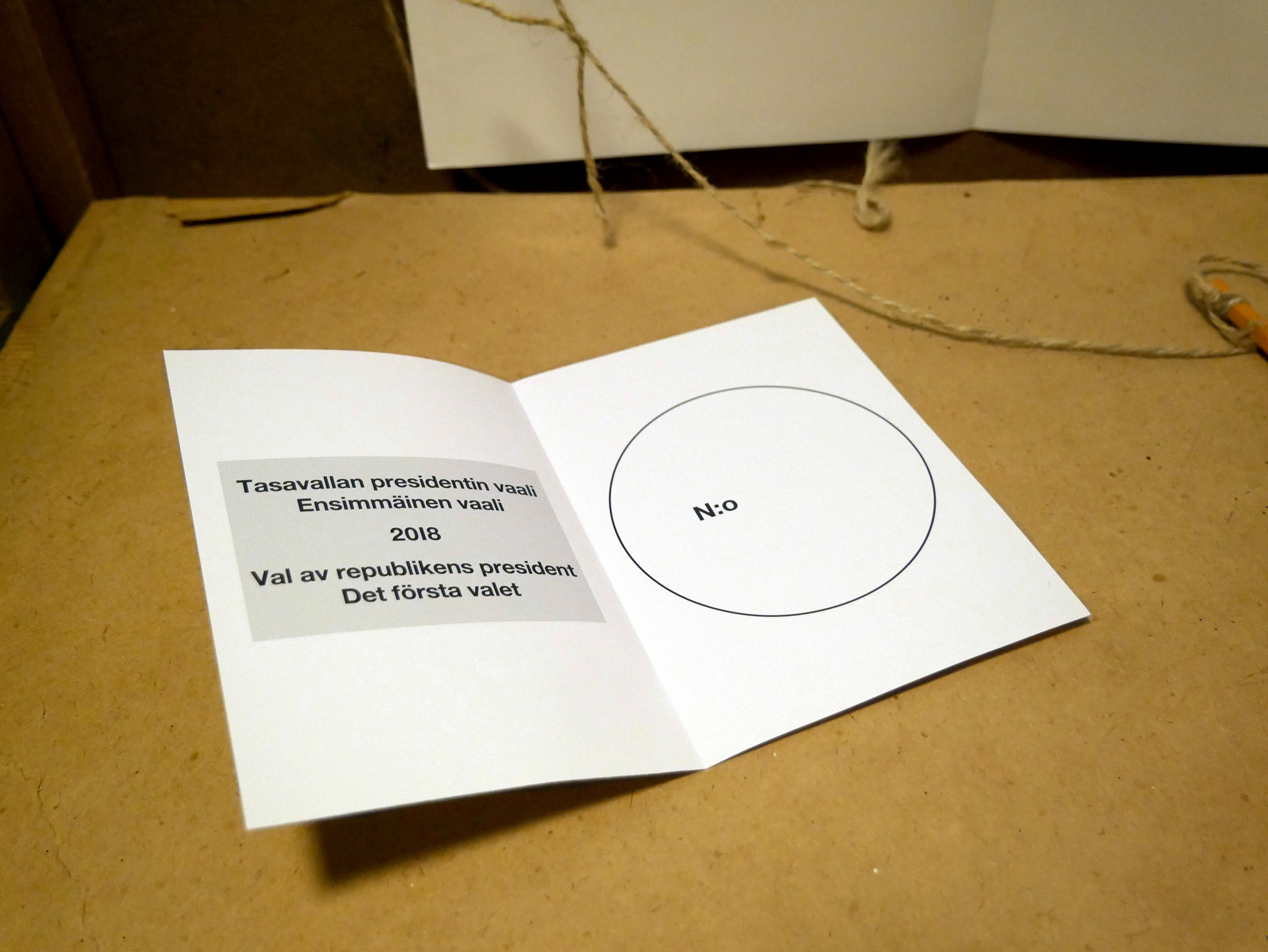
First round, Vote ticket

2018 Finnish presidential election first-round debates
Date	Organizers	Moderators	P Present N Not present								Sources
Date	Organizers	Moderators	Haatainen	Haavisto	Huhtasaari	Kyllönen	Niinistö	Torvalds	Vanhanen	Väyrynen	Sources
30 October 2017; 17:30	Finnish Business and Policy Forum (EVA); ISTV	–	P	P	P	N	P	P	P	N	
13 November 2017; 17:00	ISTV; Paasikivi Society; UKK Society; UNA Finland	Timo Haapala	P	P	P	P	P	P	N	N	
27 November 2017; 18:00	Maanpuolustuskurssiyhdistys	Pauli Aalto-Setälä	P	P	P	P	P	P	P	N	
13 December 2017; 20:00	MTV3	Jaakko Loikkanen; Juha Kaija	P	P	P	P	P	P	P	P	
14 December 2017; 21:05	Yle	Jan Andersson; Seija Vaaherkumpu	P	P	P	P	P	P	P	P	
10 January 2018; 11:30	Kaleva; Yle	Hanne Kinnunen; Petri Laukka	P	P	P	P	P	P	P	P	
12 January 2018; 18:00	Aamulehti	Sinikka Tuomi; Jussi Tuulensuu	P	P	P	P	P	P	P	P	
21 January 2018; 20:00	MTV3	Merja Ylä-Anttila; Jussi Kärki	P	P	P	P	P	P	P	P	
22 January 2018; 18:00	Iltalehti	Susanne Päivärinta; Juha Ristamäki	P	P	P	P	P	P	P	P	
22 January 2018; 20:00	Yle Fem	Ingemo Lindroos; Ville Hupa	P	P	P	P	P	P	P	P	
23 January 2018; 16:00	Helsingin Sanomat; Ilta-Sanomat	Marko Junkkari; Timo Haapala	P	P	P	P	P	P	P	P	
25 January 2018; 21:05	Yle	Jan Andersson; Seija Vaaherkumpu	P	P	P	P	P	P	P	P	

=== Fears of Russian involvement ===
In October 2017, the Security Committee of the Finnish Ministry of Defence released an assessment on the possibilities of Russian involvement in the presidential election. The assessment addressed nine possible scenarios, ranging from spreading false information through social media to a political assassination. The Security Committee also suggested ten possible objectives for Russian involvement, including obstructing discussion on NATO and isolating Finland from the European Union.

Long-time minister for foreign affairs Erkki Tuomioja heavily criticised the assessment and called it "pure fantasy resembling something from the pen of Ilkka Remes".

== Opinion polls ==
=== Verified candidates ===
Poll source	Survey dates										
Poll source	Survey dates	Niinistö Independent	Haavisto Greens	Huhtasaari Finns	Vanhanen Centre	Haatainen SDP	Kyllönen Left	Torvalds SFP	Väyrynen Independent	Others	Don't know
Kantar TNS	22–24 Jan 2018	58%	13%	5%	4%	5%	5%	3%	7%	–	–
Taloustutkimus	17–23 Jan 2018	63%	14%	6%	4%	2%	4%	2%	6%	–	–
Kantar TNS	8–17 Jan 2018	68%	11%	4%	3%	2%	3%	1%	8%	–	–
Tietoykkönen	9–16 Jan 2018	58%	14%	6%	5%	4%	4%	2%	7%	–	–
Taloustutkimus	27 Dec 2017–3 Jan 2018	72%	11%	5%	2%	3%	2%	1%	4%	–	–
Kantar TNS	4–16 Dec 2017	70%	11%	3%	2%	2%	2%	–	3%	–	6%
Tietoykkönen	23 Nov–3 Dec 2017	64%	12%	3%	3%	2%	3%	1%	2%	1%	8%
Taloustutkimus	20–28 Nov 2017	80%	10%	4%	2%	2%	1%	1%	–	1%	–
Kantar TNS	16–27 Oct 2017	67%	13%	3%	3%	2%	2%	1%	–	1%	8%
Tietoykkönen	10–11 Oct 2017	60%	10%	4%	2%	3%	3%	–	1%	2%	14%
Taloustutkimus	2–10 Oct 2017	76%	14%	3%	2%	1%	2%	1%	–	1%	–
Kantar TNS	4–14 Sep 2017	68%	13%	3%	2%	3%	2%	–	–	–	10%
Taloustutkimus	22–23 Aug 2017	60%	12%	4%	3%	–	2%	1%	2%	5%	9%
Tietoykkönen	30 May–1 Jun 2017	62%	11%	–	1%	1%	2%	1%	1%	9%	12%
Taloustutkimus	Jun 2017	72%	12%	–	3%	–	2%	–	–	5%	5%
TNS	Apr 2017	66%	19%	–	4%	–	3%	–	–	8%	–

=== Hypothetical polling ===
Poll source	Survey dates			
Poll source	Survey dates	Niinistö Independent	Haatainen SDP	Don't know
Taloustutkimus	17–23 Jan 2018	89%	11%	–
Kantar TNS	8–17 Jan 2018	80%	8%	12%
Tietoykkönen	9–16 Jan 2018	85%	15%	–
Taloustutkimus	27 Dec 2017–3 Jan 2018	92%	8%	–
Tietoykkönen	23 Nov–3 Dec 2017	91%	9%	–
Taloustutkimus	2–10 Oct 2017	94%	6%	–
Kantar TNS	4–14 Sep 2017	85%	6%	9%

Poll source	Survey dates			
Poll source	Survey dates	Niinistö Independent	Haavisto Greens	Don't know
Taloustutkimus	17–23 Jan 2018	80%	20%	–
Kantar TNS	8–17 Jan 2018	73%	14%	13%
Tietoykkönen	9–16 Jan 2018	75%	25%	–
Taloustutkimus	27 Dec 2017–3 Jan 2018	82%	18%	–
Tietoykkönen	23 Nov–3 Dec 2017	79%	21%	–
Taloustutkimus	20–28 Nov 2017	86%	14%	–
Taloustutkimus	2–10 Oct 2017	82%	18%	–
Kantar TNS	4–14 Sep 2017	77%	16%	7%
Taloustutkimus	22–23 Aug 2017	70%	22%	8%
Taloustutkimus	May 2017	76%	19%	5%

Poll source	Survey dates			
Poll source	Survey dates	Niinistö Independent	Huhtasaari Finns	Don't know
Taloustutkimus	17–23 Jan 2018	90%	10%	–
Kantar TNS	8–17 Jan 2018	83%	6%	11%
Tietoykkönen	9–16 Jan 2018	90%	10%	–
Taloustutkimus	27 Dec 2017–3 Jan 2018	93%	7%	–
Tietoykkönen	23 Nov–3 Dec 2017	94%	6%	–
Taloustutkimus	20–28 Nov 2017	93%	7%	–
Taloustutkimus	2–10 Oct 2017	96%	4%	–
Kantar TNS	4–14 Sep 2017	87%	4%	9%
Taloustutkimus	22–23 Aug 2017	87%	7%	6%

Poll source	Survey dates			
Poll source	Survey dates	Niinistö Independent	Kyllönen Left	Don't know
Taloustutkimus	17–23 Jan 2018	89%	11%	–
Tietoykkönen	9–16 Jan 2018	87%	13%	–
Taloustutkimus	27 Dec 2017–3 Jan 2018	93%	7%	–
Tietoykkönen	23 Nov–3 Dec 2017	90%	10%	–
Taloustutkimus	20–28 Nov 2017	93%	7%	–
Taloustutkimus	2–10 Oct 2017	96%	4%	–

Poll source	Survey dates			
Poll source	Survey dates	Niinistö Independent	Torvalds SFP	Don't know
Taloustutkimus	17–23 Jan 2018	95%	5%	–
Tietoykkönen	9–16 Jan 2018	91%	9%	–
Taloustutkimus	27 Dec 2017–3 Jan 2018	97%	3%	–
Tietoykkönen	23 Nov–3 Dec 2017	94%	6%	–

Poll source	Survey dates			
Poll source	Survey dates	Niinistö Independent	Vanhanen Centre	Don't know
Taloustutkimus	17–23 Jan 2018	91%	9%	–
Kantar TNS	8–17 Jan 2018	81%	6%	12%
Tietoykkönen	9–16 Jan 2018	89%	11%	–
Taloustutkimus	27 Dec 2017–3 Jan 2018	95%	5%	–
Tietoykkönen	23 Nov–3 Dec 2017	93%	7%	–
Taloustutkimus	2–10 Oct 2017	96%	4%	–
Kantar TNS	4–14 Sep 2017	89%	3%	7%

Poll source	Survey dates			
Poll source	Survey dates	Niinistö Independent	Väyrynen Independent	Don't know
Taloustutkimus	17–23 Jan 2018	89%	11%	–
Kantar TNS	8–17 Jan 2018	77%	12%	11%
Tietoykkönen	9–16 Jan 2018	85%	15%	–
Taloustutkimus	27 Dec 2017–3 Jan 2018	92%	8%	–

== Results ==
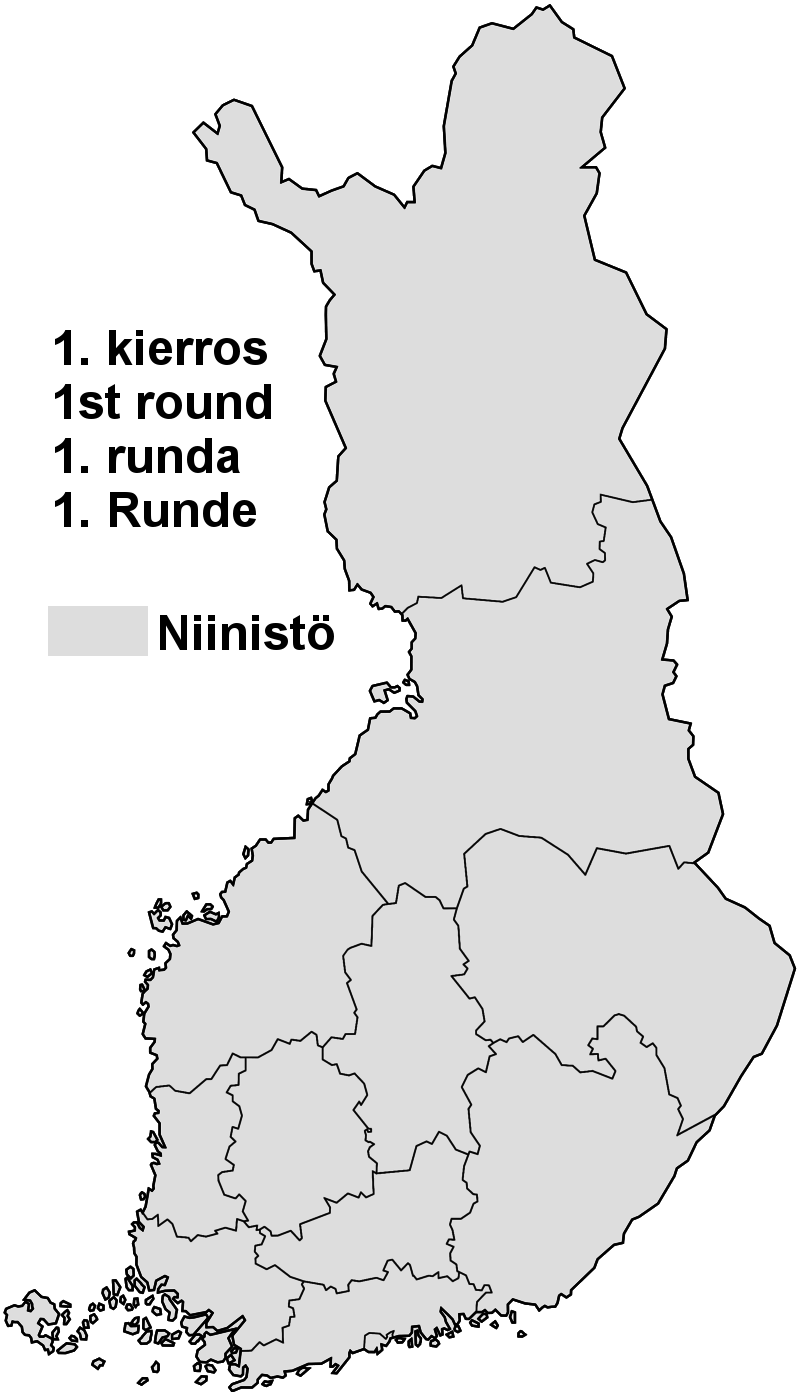
Map of Finland with the constituencies:

Candidate	Party	Votes	%
Sauli Niinistö	Independent	1,875,342	62.64
Pekka Haavisto	Green League	371,254	12.40
Laura Huhtasaari	Finns Party	207,337	6.93
Paavo Väyrynen	Independent	185,305	6.19
Matti Vanhanen	Centre Party	122,383	4.09
Tuula Haatainen	Social Democratic Party	97,294	3.25
Merja Kyllönen	Left Alliance	89,977	3.01
Nils Torvalds	Swedish People's Party	44,776	1.50
Total		2,993,668	100.00
Valid votes		2,993,668	99.70
Invalid/blank votes		9,042	0.30
Total votes		3,002,710	100.00
Registered voters/turnout		4,498,004	66.76
Source: Ministry of Justice
