= Finland (European Parliament constituency) =

Constituency of the European Parliament

- European Parliament constituency
- Location among the current constituencies
- Member state: Finland
- Created: 1996
- MEPs: 16 (1996–1999); 14 (1999–2009); 13 (2009–2020); 14 (2020–2024); 15 (June 2024–present)

Finland is a European Parliament constituency for elections to the European Parliament covering the member state of the European Union Finland. It is currently represented by fifteen Members of the European Parliament.

== Members of the European Parliament ==
| Election | MEP (party) | MEP (party) | MEP (party) | MEP (party) | MEP (party) | MEP (party) | MEP (party) | MEP (party) | MEP (party) | MEP (party) | MEP (party) | MEP (party) | MEP (party) | MEP (party) | MEP (party) | MEP (party) |
|---|---|---|---|---|---|---|---|---|---|---|---|---|---|---|---|---|
| 1996 | Sirkka-Liisa Anttila (Centre) | Mirja Ryynänen (Centre) | Kyösti Virrankoski (Centre) | Paavo Väyrynen (Centre) | Heidi Hautala (Green League) | Marjo Matikainen-Kallström (Kok) | Raimo Ilaskivi (Kok) | Jyrki Otila (Kok) | Kirsi Piha (Kok) | Reino Paasilinna (SDP) | Riitta Myller (SDP) | Jörn Donner (SDP) | Pertti Paasio (SDP) | Outi Ojala (Vas) | Esko Seppänen (Vas) | Astrid Thors (SFP) |
| 1999 | Samuli Pohjamo (Centre) | Mikko Pesälä (Centre) | Kyösti Virrankoski (Centre) | Paavo Väyrynen (Centre) | Heidi Hautala (Green League) | Marjo Matikainen-Kallström (Kok) | Piia-Noora Kauppi (Kok) | Ilkka Suominen (Kok) | Ari Vatanen (Kok) | Reino Paasilinna (SDP) | Riitta Myller (SDP) | Uma Aaltonen (SDP) | Eija-Riitta Korhola (CD) | Matti Wuori (Green League) | Esko Seppänen (Vas) | Astrid Thors (SFP) |
| 2003 | Samuli Pohjamo (Centre) | Mikko Pesälä (Centre) | Kyösti Virrankoski (Centre) | Paavo Väyrynen (Centre) | Ulpu Iivari (Green League) | Marjo Matikainen-Kallström (Kok) | Piia-Noora Kauppi (Kok) | Ilkka Suominen (Kok) | Ari Vatanen (Kok) | Reino Paasilinna (SDP) | Riitta Myller (SDP) | Uma Aaltonen (SDP) | Eija-Riitta Korhola (CD) | Matti Wuori (Green League) | Esko Seppänen (Vas) | Astrid Thors (SFP) |
| 2004 | Anneli Jäätteenmäki (Centre) | Hannu Takkula (Centre) | Kyösti Virrankoski (Centre) | Paavo Väyrynen (Centre) | Satu Hassi (Green League) | Ville Itälä (Kok) | Piia-Noora Kauppi (Kok) | Eija-Riitta Korhola (Kok) | Alexander Stubb (Kok) | Reino Paasilinna (SDP) | Riitta Myller (SDP) | Lasse Lehtinen (SDP) | 14 seats | | Esko Seppänen (Vas) | Henrik Lax (SFP) |
| 2007 | Anneli Jäätteenmäki (Centre) | Hannu Takkula (Centre) | Kyösti Virrankoski (Centre) | Samuli Pohjamo (Centre) | Satu Hassi (Green League) | Ville Itälä (Kok) | Piia-Noora Kauppi (Kok) | Eija-Riitta Korhola (Kok) | Alexander Stubb (Kok) | Reino Paasilinna (SDP) | Riitta Myller (SDP) | Lasse Lehtinen (SDP) | 14 seats | | Esko Seppänen (Vas) | Henrik Lax (SFP) |
| 2009 | Anneli Jäätteenmäki (Centre) | Hannu Takkula (Centre) | Kyösti Virrankoski (Centre) | Samuli Pohjamo (Centre) | Satu Hassi (Green League) | Ville Itälä (Kok) | Eva-Riitta Siitonen (Kok) | Eija-Riitta Korhola (Kok) | Sirpa Pietikäinen (Kok) | Reino Paasilinna (SDP) | Riitta Myller (SDP) | Lasse Lehtinen (SDP) | 14 seats | | Esko Seppänen (Vas) | Henrik Lax (SFP) |
| 2009 | Anneli Jäätteenmäki (Centre) | Hannu Takkula (Centre) | Riikka Manner (Centre) | Matti Wuori (Finns) | Satu Hassi (Green League) | Ville Itälä (Kok) | Sari Essayah (CD) | Eija-Riitta Korhola (Kok) | Sirpa Pietikäinen (Kok) | Liisa Jaakonsaari (SDP) | Mitro Repo (SDP) | 13 seats | | | Heidi Hautala (Green League) | Carl Haglund (SFP) |
| 2011 | Anneli Jäätteenmäki (Centre) | Hannu Takkula (Centre) | Riikka Manner (Centre) | Sampo Terho (Finns) | Satu Hassi (Green League) | Ville Itälä (Kok) | Sari Essayah (CD) | Eija-Riitta Korhola (Kok) | Sirpa Pietikäinen (Kok) | Liisa Jaakonsaari (SDP) | Mitro Repo (SDP) | 13 seats | | | Tarja Cronberg (Green League) | Carl Haglund (SFP) |
| 2012 | Anneli Jäätteenmäki (Centre) | Hannu Takkula (Centre) | Riikka Manner (Centre) | Sampo Terho (Finns) | Satu Hassi (Green League) | Petri Sarvamaa (Kok) | Sari Essayah (CD) | Eija-Riitta Korhola (Kok) | Sirpa Pietikäinen (Kok) | Liisa Jaakonsaari (SDP) | Mitro Repo (SDP) | 13 seats | | | Tarja Cronberg (Green League) | Nils Torvalds (SFP) |
| 2014 | Anneli Jäätteenmäki (Centre) | Olli Rehn (Centre) | Paavo Väyrynen (Centre) | Sampo Terho (Finns) | Heidi Hautala (Green League) | Alexander Stubb (Kok) | Jussi Halla-aho (Finns) | Henna Virkkunen (Kok) | Sirpa Pietikäinen (Kok) | Liisa Jaakonsaari (SDP) | Miapetra Kumpula-Natri (SDP) | 13 seats | | | Merja Kyllönen (Vas) | Nils Torvalds (SFP) |
| 2019 | Elsi Katainen (Centre) | Mauri Pekkarinen (Centre) | Ville Niinistö (Green League) | Teuvo Hakkarainen (Finns) | Heidi Hautala (Green League) | Petri Sarvamaa (Kok) | Laura Huhtasaari (Finns) | Henna Virkkunen (Kok) | Sirpa Pietikäinen (Kok) | Eero Heinäluoma (SDP) | Miapetra Kumpula-Natri (SDP) | Alviina Alametsä* (Green League) | 14 seats | | Silvia Modig (Vas) | Nils Torvalds (SFP) |
| 2023 | Elsi Katainen (Centre) | Mauri Pekkarinen (Centre) | Ville Niinistö (Green League) | Teuvo Hakkarainen (Finns) | Heidi Hautala (Green League) | Petri Sarvamaa (Kok) | Pirkko Ruohonen-Lerner (Finns) | Henna Virkkunen (Kok) | Sirpa Pietikäinen (Kok) | Eero Heinäluoma (SDP) | Miapetra Kumpula-Natri (SDP) | Alviina Alametsä* (Green League) | 14 seats | | Silvia Modig (Vas) | Nils Torvalds (SFP) |
| 2024 | Elsi Katainen (Centre) | Mauri Pekkarinen (Centre) | Ville Niinistö (Green League) | Teuvo Hakkarainen (Finns) | Heidi Hautala (Green League) | Eija-Riitta Korhola (Kok) | Pirkko Ruohonen-Lerner (Finns) | Henna Virkkunen (Kok) | Sirpa Pietikäinen (Kok) | Eero Heinäluoma (SDP) | Miapetra Kumpula-Natri (SDP) | Alviina Alametsä* (Green League) | 14 seats | | Silvia Modig (Vas) | Nils Torvalds (SFP) |
| 2024 | Elsi Katainen (Centre) | Katri Kulmuni (Centre) | Ville Niinistö (Green League) | Sebastian Tynkkynen (Finns) | Heidi Hautala (Green League) | Mika Aaltola (Kok) | Pekka Toveri (Kok) | Henna Virkkunen (Kok) | Sirpa Pietikäinen (Kok) | Eero Heinäluoma (SDP) | Maria Guzenina (SDP) | Aura Salla (Kok) | Jussi Saramo (Vas) | Merja Kyllönen (Vas) | Li Andersson (Vas) | Anna-Maja Henriksson (SFP) |

== Elections ==
=== 1996 ===
The 1996 election was the first European election for Finland.

=== 1999 ===
The 1999 European election was the fifth election to the European Parliament and the second for Finland.

=== 2004 ===
The 2004 European election was the sixth election to the European Parliament and the third for Finland. Both the Social Democratic Party of Finland and the Centre Party improved their vote at the expense of the conservative National Coalition Party and the Green League.

=== 2009 ===
The 2009 European election was the seventh election to the European Parliament and the fourth for Finland. The number of seats was decreased to thirteen.

=== 2014 ===
The 2014 European election was the eighth election to the European Parliament and the fifth for Finland. Finland's representation remained at 13 MEPs.

=== 2019 ===
The 2019 European election was the ninth election to the European Parliament and the sixth for Finland. Due to Brexit, Alviina Alametsä became the fourteenth Finnish MEP on February 1, 2020.

=== 2024 ===
The 2024 European election will be the tenth election to the European Parliament and the seventh for Finland. It gained one seat because of the seats being increased from 705 to 720 in the European Parliament.
