= Eija-Riitta Korhola =

Finnish politician (born 1959)

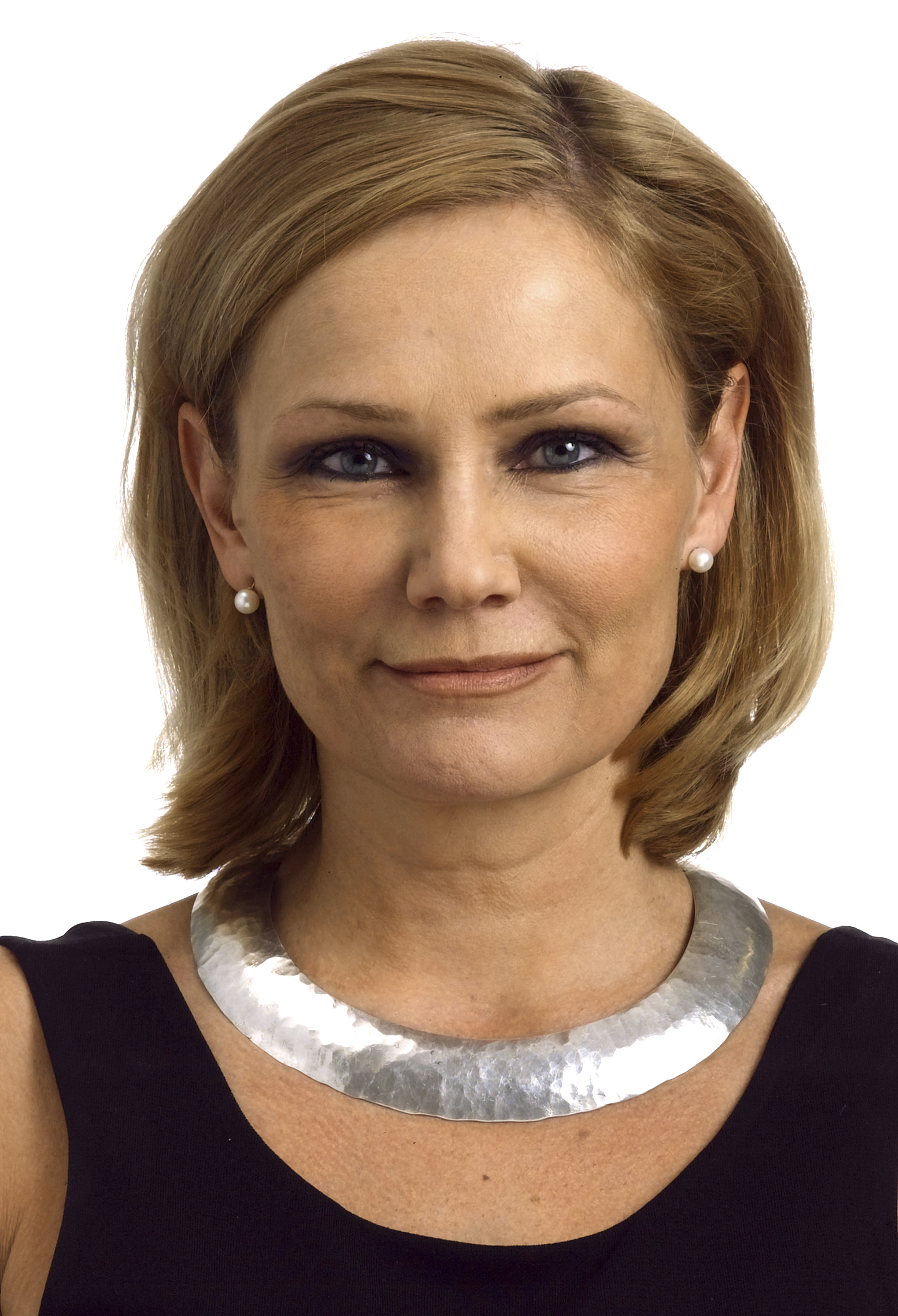

Member of the European Parliament
- In office 1999 – 2014, 2024
- Constituency: Finland

Personal details
- Born: 15 June 1959 (age 67) Lahti
- Party: European People's Party
- Other political affiliations: Christian Democrats, National Coalition Party
- Children: 3
- Education: University of Helsinki
- Website: korhola.com

Eija-Riitta Korhola (née Nieminen; born 15 June 1959) is a Finnish politician and former Member of the European Parliament (MEP). She served three terms, first with the Finnish Christian Democrats between 1999–2003 and then with the National Coalition Party from 2004 to 2014, being part of the European People's Party the whole time. During her years as a MEP, Korhola served on the Committee on the Environment, Public Health and Food Safety. She was also a member of the ACP–EU Joint Parliamentary Assembly, and acted as a deputy both in the Committee on Budgetary Control and in the Committee on Foreign Affairs. She was also briefly MEP from June to July 2024 after the resignation of Petri Sarvamaa.

== Personal and early life and education ==
Korhola was born on 15 June 1959 in Lahti. She is a member of the Evangelical Lutheran Church of Finland.

She has studied in and graduated from the University of Helsinki with the following degrees:

- 1990: Bachelor of Arts in philosophy
- 1994: Licentiate in philosophy
- 2014: Doctorate in environmental science

== Career ==
- 1993–1996: Development educator, Finn Church Aid
- 1994–1998: Assistant, radio editorial office
- 1996–1999: Journalist and educator on the radio and television and in the press
- 1997: Publicist (Helsinki Festival)
- 1999–2014: Member of the European Parliament
- 2003: Party secretary of the Finnish Christian Democrats
- 2006–2010: Vice chairwoman of the Finnish National Coalition Party
- Since 2002: Chairwoman of the First Step Forum (human rights organization)

Party political offices
Preceded by Milla Kalliomaa	Secretary General of the Christian Democrats; 2003	Succeeded by Annika Kokko
