= Pirkko Ruohonen-Lerner =

Finnish politician (born 1957)

Pirkko Ruohonen-Lerner MEP
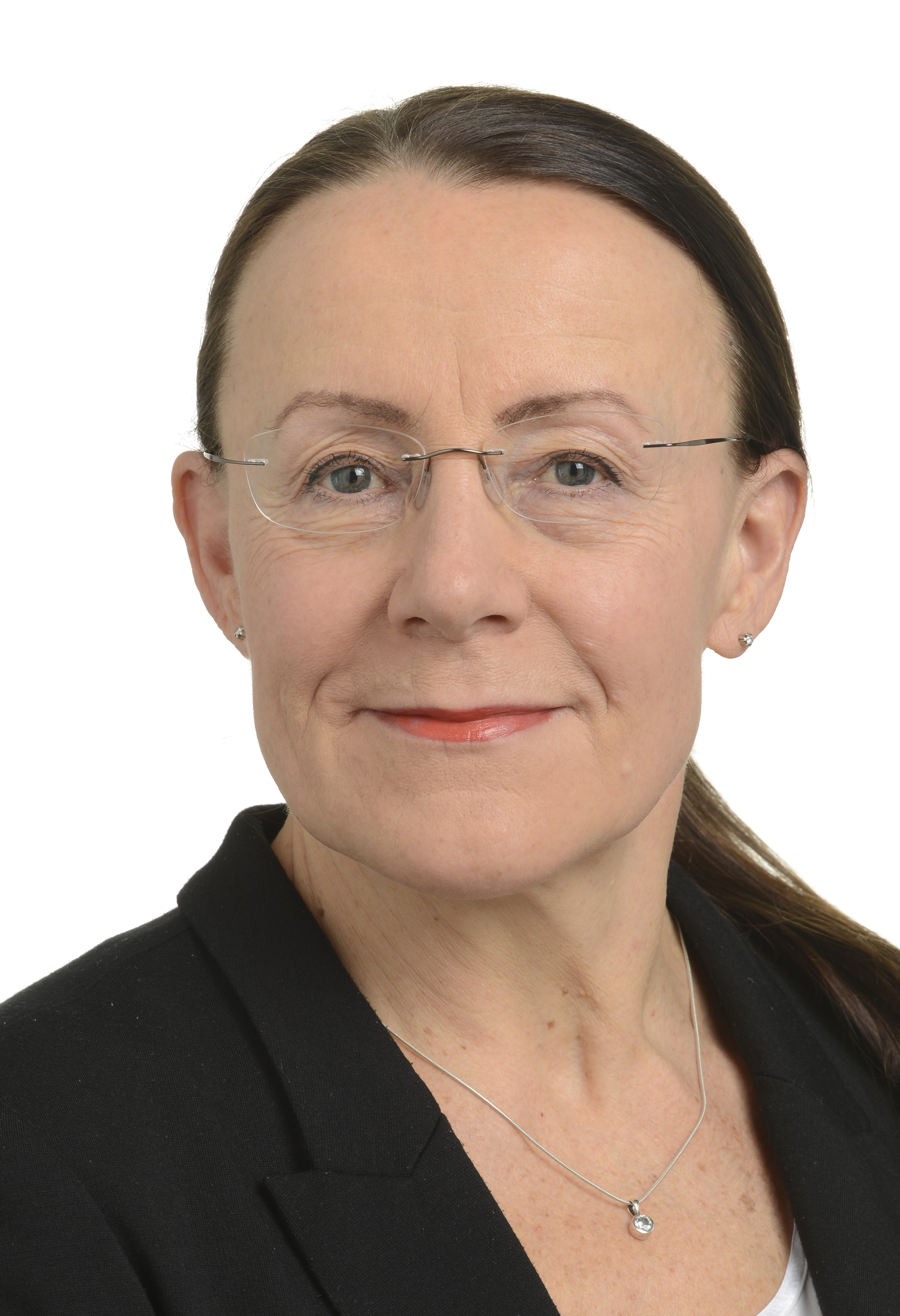

Member of the European Parliament
- Incumbent
- Assumed office 11 April 2023
- Preceded by: Laura Huhtasaari
- Constituency: Finland
- In office 27 April 2015 – 1 July 2019
- Preceded by: Sampo Terho
- Constituency: Finland

Member of the Finnish Parliament
- In office 21 March 2007 – 6 May 2015
- Constituency: Uusimaa

Personal details
- Born: Pirkko Anneli Ruohonen-Lerner; 6 February 1957 (age 69) Hyvinkää, Finland
- Party: Finnish; Finns Party; EU; European Conservatives and Reformists
- Education: University of Helsinki
- Website: www.pirkon.info

Pirkko Anneli Ruohonen-Lerner (born 6 February 1957) is a Finnish politician and Member of the European Parliament (MEP) from Finland. She is a member of the Finns Party, part of the European Conservatives and Reformists.

She was elected to Finnish Parliament in 2007 and served as a member of parliament until 2015. She was the chair of the party's parliamentary group from 2011 to 2014. In April 2015, Ruohonen-Lerner succeeded Sampo Terho in the European Parliament when Terho was elected to the Parliament of Finland.

In her political career, she has served as a member of the council of the municipality of Myrskylä from 1985 to 1988 (then with the National Coalition Party), and as a member of the council of the city of Porvoo since 1996.

She returned to the European Parliament on 11 April 2023 following the resignation of Laura Huhtasaari.
