= Laura Huhtasaari =

Finnish politician and teacher (born 1979)

Laura Huhtasaari MEP
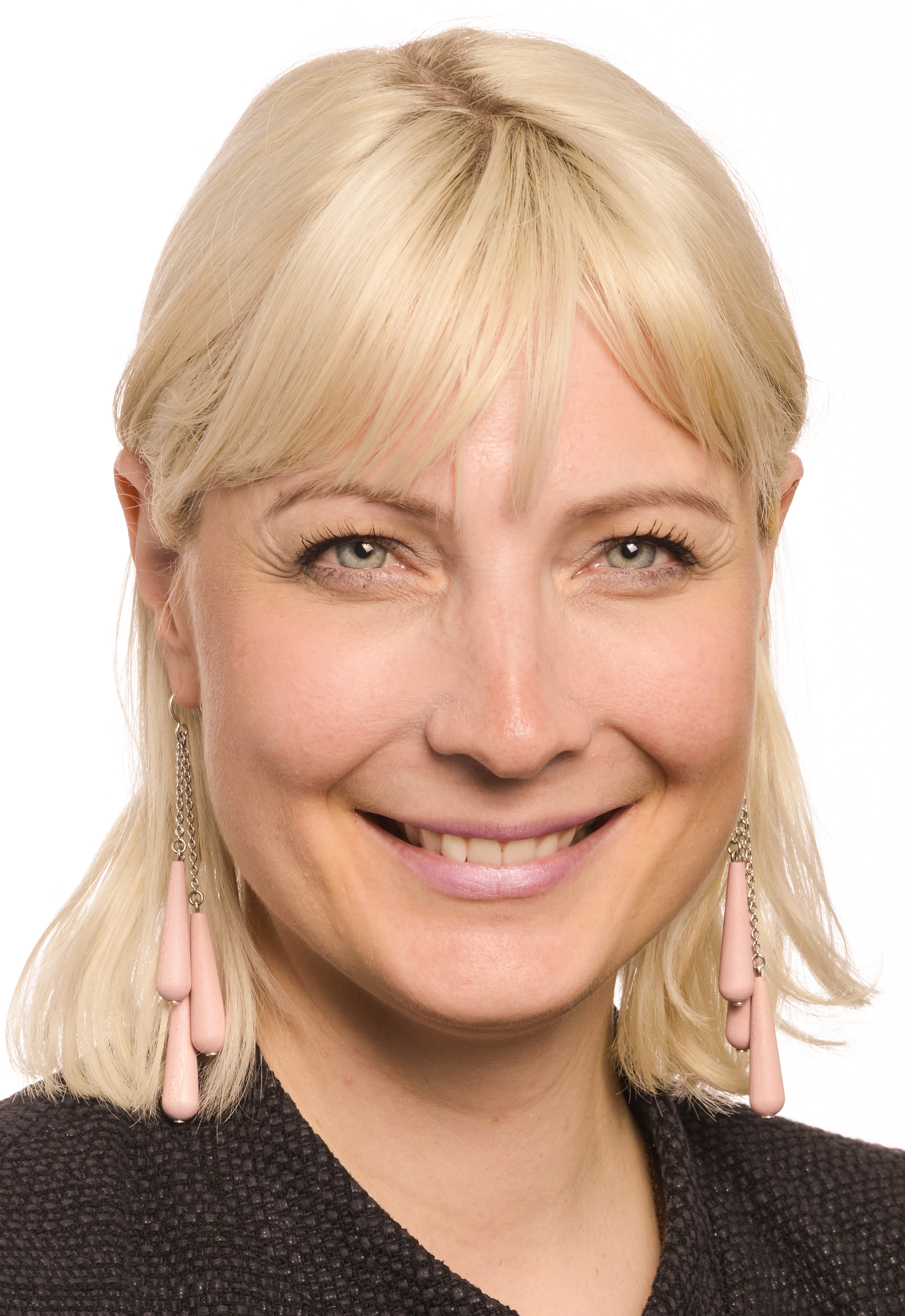

Member of the Finnish Parliament for Satakunta
- Incumbent
- Assumed office 5 April 2023
- In office 22 April 2015 – 2 July 2019

Member of the European Parliament for Finland
- In office 3 July 2019 – 11 April 2023
- Succeeded by: Pirkko Ruohonen-Lerner

Personal details
- Born: 30 March 1979 (age 47) Vilppula, Pirkanmaa, Finland
- Party: Finns Party
- Education: Master of Education
- Alma mater: University of Jyväskylä
- Occupation: Politician, teacher

Laura Huhtasaari (born 30 March 1979) is a Finnish politician and teacher. As a member of the Finns Party, she has represented Satakunta in the Parliament of Finland from April 2015 to July 2019. She was the Finns Party candidate for the 2018 Finnish presidential election. In 2019 Huhtasaari was elected to the European Parliament with 92,760 votes

== Life and career ==
Huhtasaari graduated as Master of Education in 2004. She has worked as an elementary teacher and a special education teacher. She was elected to the City Council of Pori with 1,064 votes in 2012 and again with 2,566 votes in 2017. She stood in the 2014 European Parliament election and received 9,132 votes but was not elected. In 2015 Huhtasaari was elected to the Parliament with 9,259 votes. In the Parliament, she is currently member of the Legal Affairs Committee, the Education and Culture Committee and the Finnish Delegation to the Nordic Council.

Huhtasaari endorsed Jussi Halla-aho for president of the Finns Party. She was elected first vice president of the Finns Party on 10 June 2017, the same day when Halla-aho was elected president. On 4 August 2017, Huhtasaari was chosen as the presidential candidate of the Finns Party. In the election, Huhtasaari placed third with 6.9 percent of the votes, while the incumbent president Sauli Niinistö went on to secure his second term with a majority of votes.

She was elected to the Parliament of Finland in the 2023 Finnish parliamentary election.

== Views ==
Huhtasaari believes that the European Union is going to collapse and Finland should leave the EU. She accused the EU of trying to turn itself into a state, which she described as a threat to Finnish interest, sovereignty and democracy. She also suggested that Finland withdraw from the Ottawa Treaty and Paris Agreement, and ban Islam from the country.

Huhtasaari opposes Finland becoming a member of NATO but supports developing cooperation with the alliance. She is a supporter of United States President Donald Trump. As a Eurosceptic, she strongly defends the Brexit decision. She also believes that the president of Finland should have more power.

After the 2020 United States presidential election, Huhtasaari tweeted that "USA is now a communistic nation".

Huhtasaari has also said that "feminists today loath Jewish-Christian culture and they hate white Christian men".

Huhtasaari is a creationist and believes that evolution is a "totally impossible theory". She has also said that Finland should reject international agreements to prevent economic migrants from coming to Finland.

== Thesis plagiarism ==
During the 2018 presidential election campaign, Huhtasaari was accused of plagiarising parts of her 2003 M.Sc. thesis. The matter was investigated by her alma mater, the University of Jyväskylä, with the conclusion that only 10 per cent of the thesis was plagiariased, and that the plagiarism was not particularly serious considering the policies of the university at the time.

However, in May 2018, Finland's national public broadcasting company YLE reported that approximately 30 per cent of the thesis was plagiarised, after an YLE journalist identified a previously unknown source for the text in Huhtasaari's thesis. Huhtasaari responded by claiming to have written the dissertation in good faith, relying on any shortcomings being detected during the review process. She also claimed to have followed the university's own guidance regarding citing of earlier theses, namely that such citations were (allegedly) advised against, as dissertations could not be guaranteed to be of sufficiently high academic standards. To defend her integrity, Huhtasaari published a positive employment certificate for her 1-year-tenure as a second-grade teacher at an elementary school in the Marshall Islands from April 2000.

The University of Jyväskylä released its detailed report in August 2018, finding serious plagiarism and disregard for the scientific method throughout Huhtasaari's thesis. As the statute of limitations had passed, the university will not pursue further action.

== Elections contested ==
=== Presidential elections ===
Year	Votes	%	Result
2018	207,337	6.9	3rd

=== Parliamentary elections ===
Year	Constituency	Votes	Result
2011	Satakunta	1,950	Backup
2015	Satakunta	9,259	Elected
2019	Satakunta	12,986	Elected
2023	Satakunta	8,393	Elected

=== European Parliament elections ===
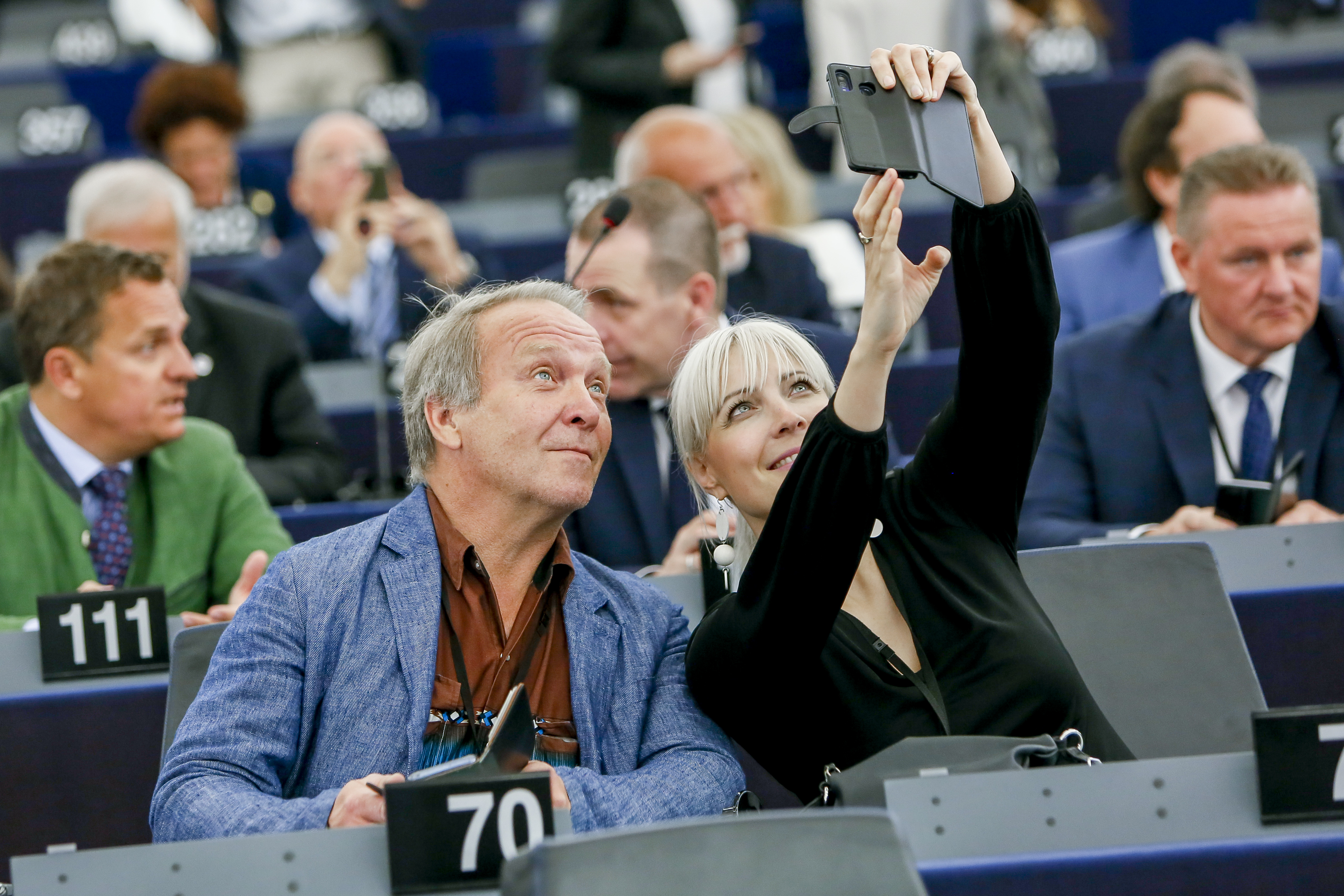
Teuvo Hakkarainen and Laura Huhtasaari during the Constitution of the 9th legislature of the European Parliament in 2019

Year	Constituency	Votes	Result
2014	Finland	9,132	Not elected
2019	Finland	92,760	Elected

=== Municipal elections ===
Year	Municipality	Constituency	Votes	Result
2012	Pori	Satakunta	1,064	Elected
2017	Pori	Satakunta	2,566	Elected
