= Mattlidens Gymnasium =

Swedish speaking school in Finland

Coordinates: 60.1637°N 24.7504°E

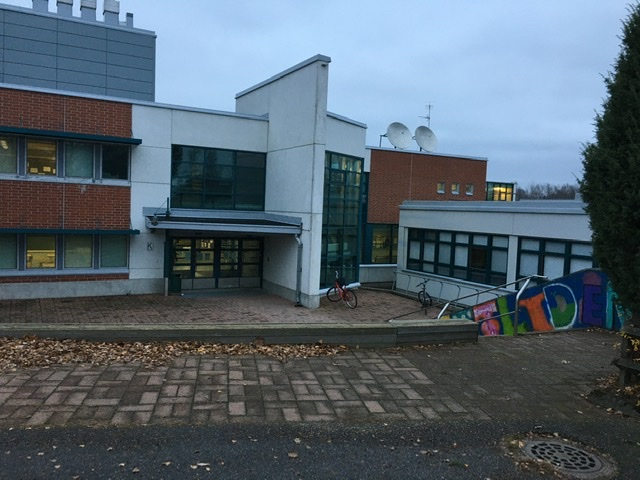
Entrance to the school.

Mattlidens Gymnasium is a Swedish speaking upper secondary school in Espoo, Finland. It was founded in 1977 as a standalone upper secondary school from Drumsö Svenska Samskola. With nearly 700 students, the school is the largest Swedish speaking high school in Finland.

The school is an International Baccalaureate affiliate school, with about 150 students studying for the IB Diploma. The non-IB students opt to study towards the Swedish-speaking version of the Finnish Matriculation Exam (see: Studentexamen). IB intake is usually 50 students.

In the Finnish Matriculation Examination, Mattlidens Gymnasium has consistently placed in the top 10%.

== Notable alumni ==
- Carl Haglund
- Mark Levengood
- Marcus Grönholm
- Cris af Enehielm
- Sean Bergenheim
