= Teuvo Hakkarainen =

Finnish politician (born 1960)

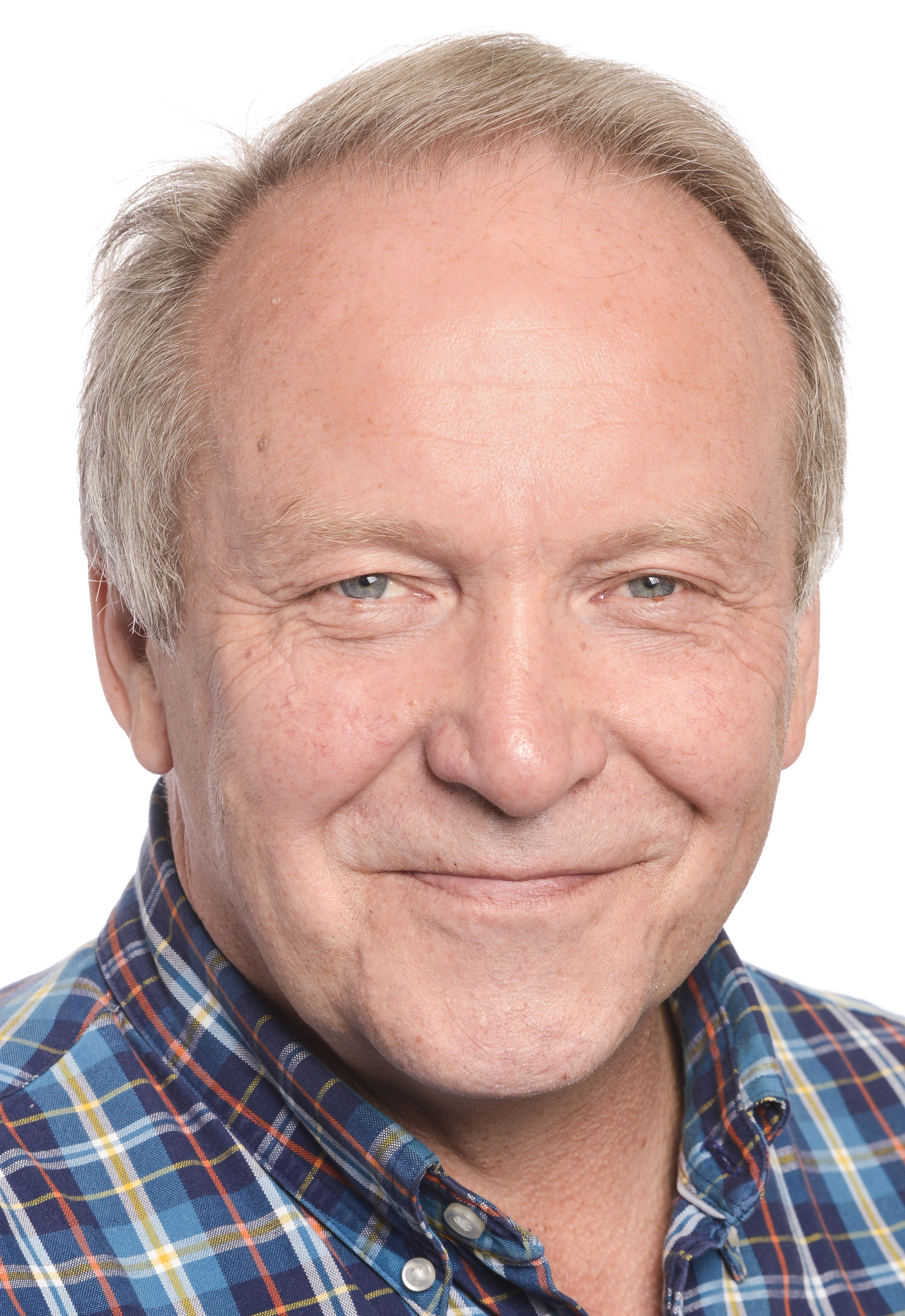

Member of the European Parliament
- In office 2 July 2019 – 15 July 2024
- Constituency: Finland

Member of Finnish Parliament for Central Finland
- In office 20 April 2011 – 2 July 2019

Personal details
- Born: 12 April 1960 (age 66) Viitasaari, Central Finland, Finland
- Party: Finns Party (until 2024)
- Other political affiliations: Freedom Alliance
- Website: www.teuvohakkarainen.fi

Teuvo Hakkarainen (born 12 April 1960 in Viitasaari) is a Finnish politician and former member of the European Parliament. Before being elected to the European Parliament in the 2019 election, he had been a member of the Finnish Parliament since 2011.

On 10 June 2017, Hakkarainen was elected Second Vice Chairman of the Finns Party. He served in the position until December 2017, when he resigned the post after sexually harassing a fellow member of parliament. On 30 April 2024, Hakkarainen decided to run in the 2024 European Parliament election in Finland as an uncommitted candidate of the Freedom Alliance after the Finns Party refused to nominate him for re-election. This resulted in Hakkarainen getting expelled from the Finns Party on 9 May 2024. He subsequently lost his seat in the European Parliament and announced his retirement from politics.

== Views and comments ==
=== Sexual minorities ===
In May 2011, Hakkarainen was talking to junior high school students. When some students asked Hakkarainen's opinion about gay adoptions, he told students that "if two gays have a child, the child would become a double gay", and said that he did so jokingly because he would rather answer questions regarding government talks.

In October 2011, Hakkarainen told the tabloid Ilta-Sanomat that homosexuals, lesbians and Somalis ought to be deported to Åland to form their own society.

=== Death penalty ===
On 16 December 2015, as a member of Finnish Parliament and a representative of the Finns Party, Hakkarainen inquired the Minister of Justice, a member of the same party, if capital punishment could be re-enacted, referring to the court case against two asylum seekers. They were suspected of 11 murders committed with terrorist intent in Iraq, but were released.

=== Racism ===
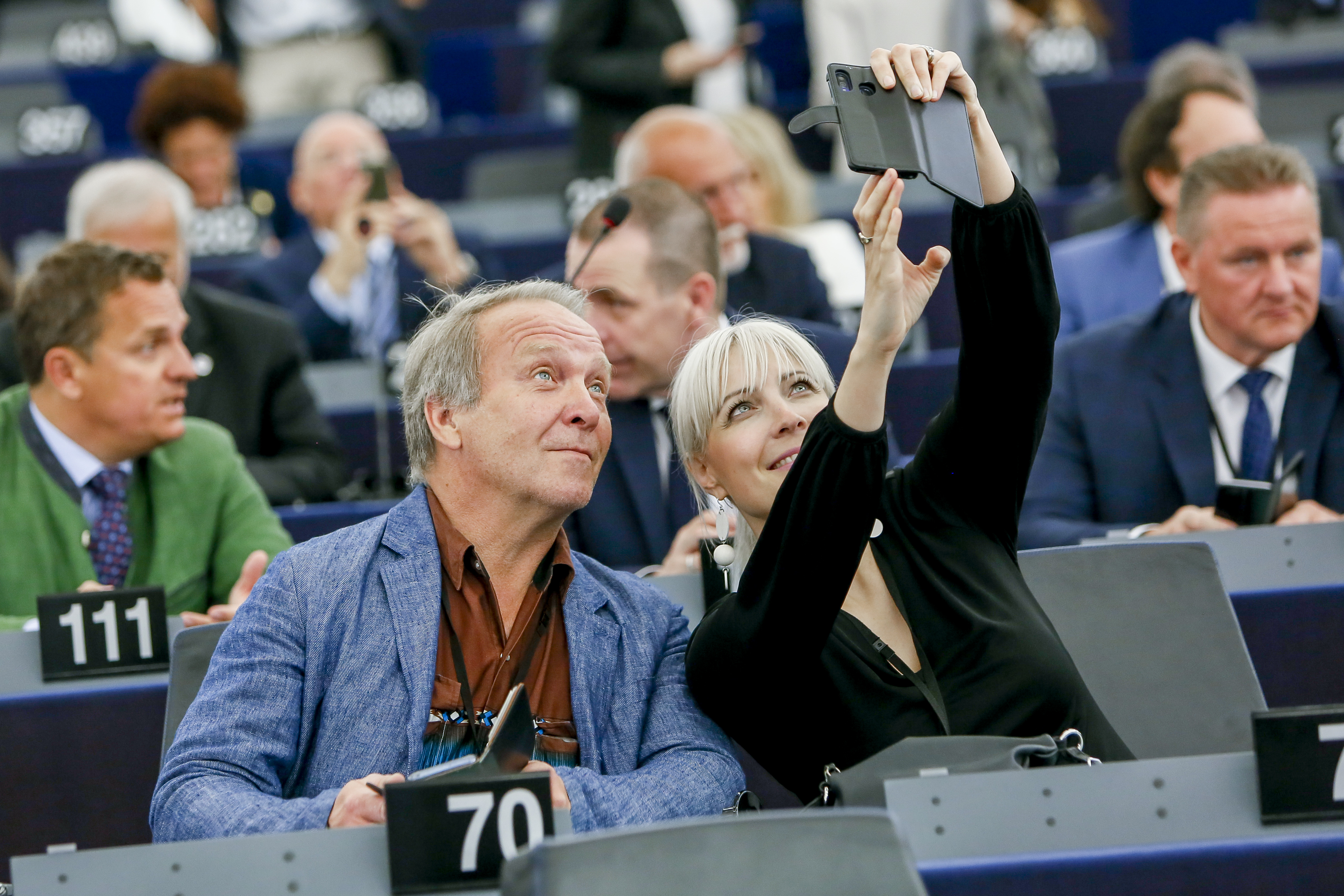
Teuvo Hakkarainen and Laura Huhtasaari during the Constitution of the 9th legislature of the European Parliament in 2019

In April 2011, Hakkarainen openly expressed his opinions towards black people and Muslims in an interview with Helsingin Sanomat. During the interview Hakkarainen used a pejorative word neekeriukko (which translates to male "negro" or "nigger" and is considered as an offensive racial slur). He also made a mocking imitation of the Islamic call to prayer.

The Ombudsman for Minorities of Finland, Eva Biaudet, asked the Prosecutor General of Finland to investigate if Hakkarainen may be guilty in some crimes according to the criminal codex for example incitement to ethnic or racial hatred. Later The Finnish Police announced that they did not feel that comments made by Hakkarainen give cause for a criminal investigation. Police proposed to the Prosecutor General that no criminal investigation should be launched, saying that Hakkarainen's comments were an exercise of free speech, and not hate speech. Hakkarainen defended the language he had used by stating that he comes from a rural background.

In January 2017, Hakkarainen was convicted of incitement against an ethnic group.

== 2017 sexual harassment case ==
In December 2017, Hakkarainen assaulted MP Veera Ruoho in the parliament house. The incident occurred at the parliament café where Ruoho was having a break during a debate, while the Finns Party were celebrating their Christmas party. Ruoho was sitting on a table as Hakkarainen grabbed her neck from behind and forcefully kissed her in the face. According to Ruoho, she was scared for her neck and her mouth hurt as well. Hakkarainen was under the influence of alcohol. He was convicted of assault and sexual harassment for fines of 5,440 euros.

== Personal life ==
Hakkarainen was a co-owner of the Haka-Wood saw mill in Viitasaari. After his election to the Finnish parliament, Ilta-Sanomat reported that Haka-Wood had been granted 461,750 euros of European Union subsidies for a development project, even though Hakkarainen had run a heavily Eurosceptic campaign. Haka-Wood received funds from the European Regional Development Fund. Hakkarainen stated to Helsingin Sanomat that "if we weren't members [of the EU], we wouldn't be asking them for money". He subsequently sold his share of Haka-Wood. Hakkarainen has worked as a sawmill consultant in Honduras, Nicaragua, Guatemala and El Salvador.

In 1986, Hakkarainen was a member of a gang that broke into the Suomussalmi church and stole 125 eucharist chalices, 24 bottles of sacramental wine and the money offerings. He was given a 9 months suspended sentence.
