= Merja Kyllönen =

Finnish politician (born 1977)

Merja Kyllönen MEP
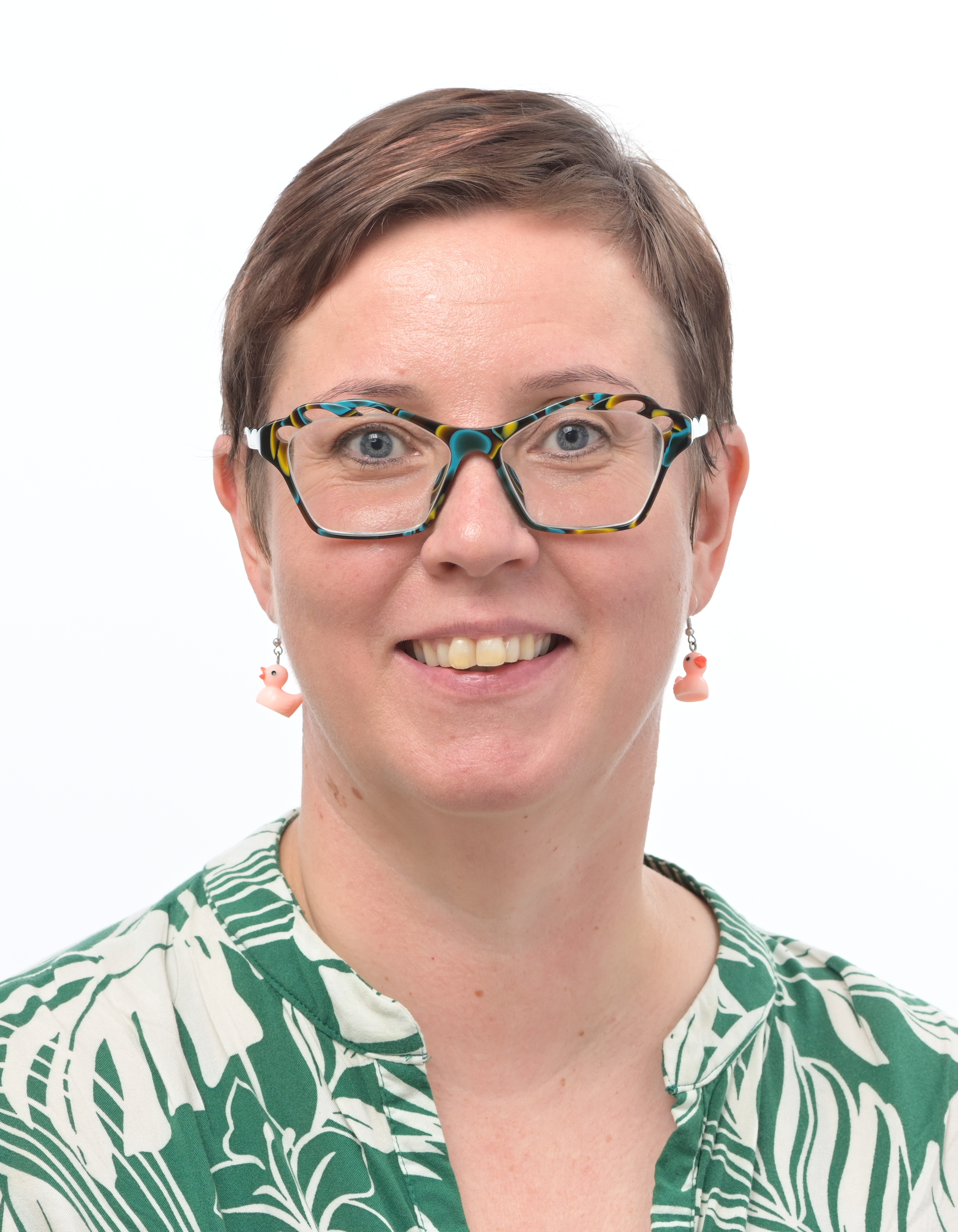

Member of the European Parliament
- In office 1 July 2014 – 1 July 2019
- Constituency: Finland

Minister of Transport
- In office 22 June 2011 – 24 April 2014
- Prime Minister: Jyrki Katainen
- Preceded by: Anu Vehviläinen
- Succeeded by: Henna Virkkunen

Member of the Finnish Parliament
- In office 21 March 2007 – 30 June 2014
- Constituency: Oulu

Personal details
- Born: 25 January 1977 (age 49) Suomussalmi, Finland
- Party: Finnish; Left Alliance; EU; The Left in the European Parliament – GUE/NGL

Merja Sinikka Kyllönen (born 25 January 1977) is a Finnish politician and Member of the European Parliament (MEP) from Finland. She is a member of the Left Alliance, part of The Left in the European Parliament – GUE/NGL. She was the Minister of Transport in Katainen Cabinet 2011–2014. From 2014 to 2019 she was a Member of the European Parliament (MEP), representing Finland.

In 2018, Kyllönen was the candidate of the Left Alliance in the Finnish presidential election. In the election, Kyllönen placed seventh with 3 percent of the votes, while the incumbent president Sauli Niinistö went on to secure his second term with a majority of votes.

== Early career ==
Merja Kyllönen graduated as a biomedical laboratory technician from the Oulu Polytechnic in Suomussalmi, Kainuu in 2000. While working as a laboratory officer and a technical assistant at a pharmacy, Kyllönen “continued her career in politics in the Council of the Kainuu region, among the representatives of Tradeka (2004–2011), and in the Parliament of Finland beginning in 2003.” She was serving at different capacities including “as a member of the Chancellery Commission and the Employment and Equality Committee. She was appointed to the executive board of the parliamentary group of the Left Alliance.” Kyllönen brought far-reaching reforms in the transport sector during her tenure as the Minister of Transport in the Katainen Cabinet. These include “a toll system favoring public transport and decreasing the alcohol level limit for driving under influence” and government resolution to convert the Helsinki-Malmi Airport into a residential area.

== Parliamentary service ==
- Member, Committee on Transport and Tourism
- Member, Delegation to the EU-Russia Parliamentary Cooperation Committee

Kyllönen, as a rapporteur, supported the Fourth Railway Package.

Kyllönen served as rapporteur for the controversial directive on posted drivers, meant to update the Posted Workers Directive 1996 and related acts, amendments on which received very narrow and surprise majorities, including one on whether to ensure conditions of workers' accommodation and the reimbursement of expenditures related to their posting assignment, where over 50 MEPs changed their vote on the record after the result was determined. The text was eventually approved in April 2019, the fourth session which debated or voted on the subject.

In March 2019, Kyllönen was the recipient of the Transport and Tourism Award at The Parliament Magazine's annual MEP Awards.
