= Carl Haglund =

Finnish politician (born 1979)

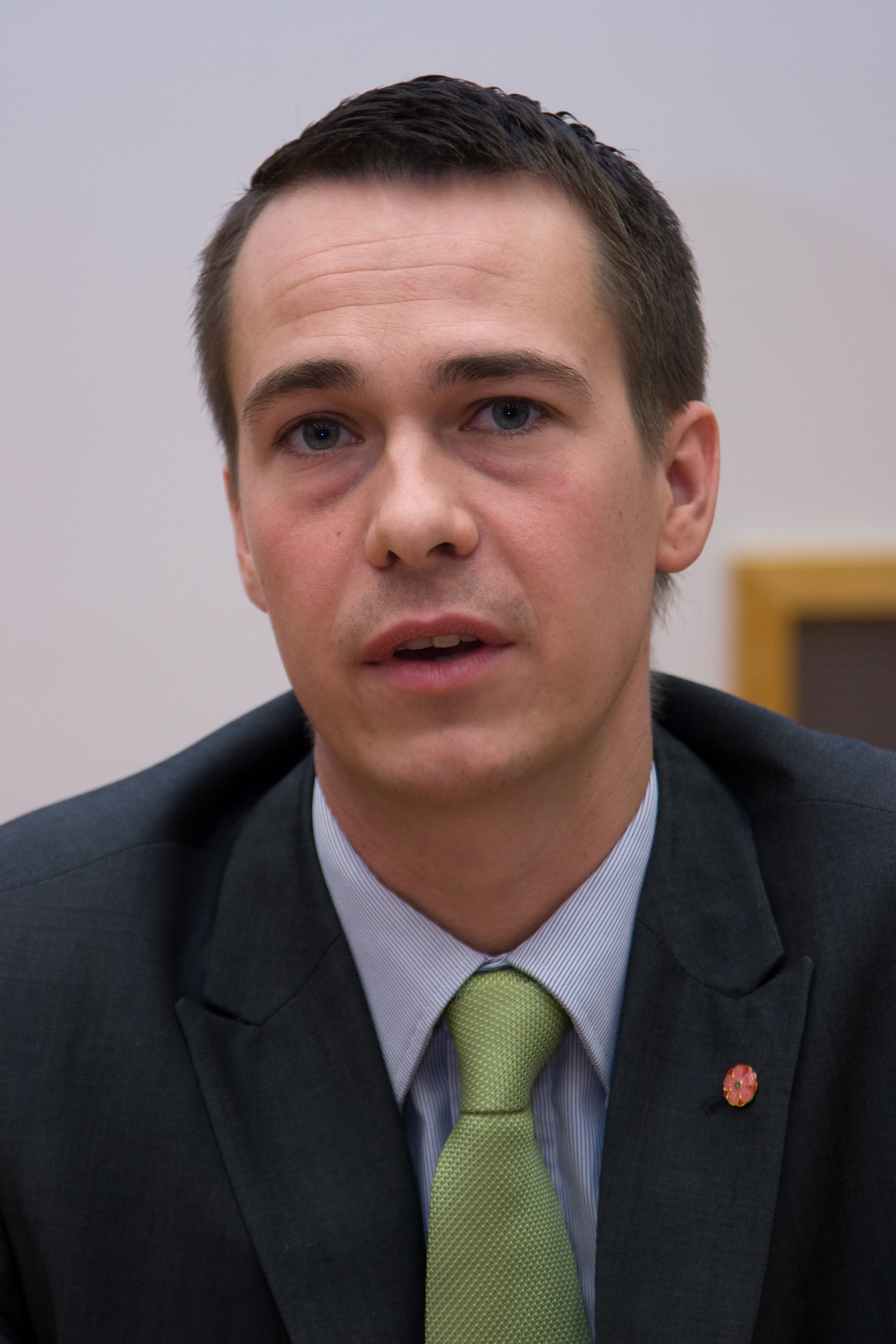

Member of the Finnish Parliament for Uusimaa
- In office 22 April 2015 – 30 July 2016

Minister of Defence
- In office 5 July 2012 – 29 May 2015
- Prime Minister: Jyrki Katainen; Alexander Stubb
- Preceded by: Stefan Wallin
- Succeeded by: Jussi Niinistö

Member of the European Parliament for Finland
- In office 14 July 2009 – 4 July 2012
- Succeeded by: Nils Torvalds

Leader of the Swedish People's Party of Finland
- In office 10 June 2012 – 12 June 2016
- Preceded by: Stefan Wallin
- Succeeded by: Anna-Maja Henriksson

Personal details
- Born: 29 March 1979 (age 47) Espoo, Finland
- Party: Swedish People's Party
- Children: 2
- Education: Mattlidens Gymnasium (IB); Sydväst Polytechnic; Åbo Akademi University; Hanken School of Economics (MBA, 2007)
- Occupation: Politician

Carl Christoffer "Calle" Haglund (born 29 March 1979 in Espoo) is the CEO of KH Group, after the role in Veritas, former MP, former chairman of the Swedish People's Party and the former Minister of Defence. He was a member of the European Parliament (MEP) from 2009 to 2012. Haglund was elected chairman of his party in June 2012. Haglund serves as the chairman of the board for Finnish Business and Policy Forum 'EVA' and Research Institute of the Finnish Economy 'ETLA'. Haglund served on the board of Enersense International PLC. He resigned in July 2025 after being nominated as the CEO of Aktia Bank PLC. However, he was fired in September 2025 before taking office.

In the 2015 Finnish parliamentary election, Haglund received over 21,000 votes, the fourth largest number of votes in the country. In March 2016, Haglund announced that he would not run for another term as the chairman, as he was disappointed in politics and wanted to spend more time with his family. On 12 June 2016, he was followed by the former Minister of Justice of Finland Anna-Maja Henriksson.

On 21 June 2016, Haglund announced that he would leave the Parliament to work for the Chinese bioenergy company Sunshine Kaidi New Energy Group. He left his seat on 30 July and was followed by Veronica Rehn-Kivi. In 2018 he joined Accenture as its Nordic head of banking and insurance business.

== Education ==
Haglund obtained his International Baccalaureate (IB) at Mattlidens Gymnasium in Espoo. He obtained his MBA from the Hanken School of Economics in 2007.

== Personal life ==
Haglund has Fenno-Swedish background. He has two children (Edward Carl Wilhelm Haglund) with his former wife.

=== Awards ===
- Order of the Polar Star (Sweden, Grand Cross, 2015)
- Order of the White Rose of Finland (Finland, Commander, 2014)

Political offices
| Preceded by Stefan Wallin | Minister of Defence; 2012–2015 | Succeeded by Jussi Niinistö |
Party political offices
| Preceded by Stefan Wallin | Leader of the Swedish People's Party of Finland; 2012–2016 | Succeeded by Anna-Maja Henriksson |
