= 2022 Finnish county elections =

2022 Finish county election

- January 23, 2022
Party	Leader	Vote %	Seats
National Coalition	Petteri Orpo	21.51	289
SDP	Sanna Marin	19.24	275
Centre	Annika Saarikko	19.10	297
Finns	Riikka Purra	11.07	156
Left Alliance	Li Andersson	7.96	100
Green	Iiris Suomela	7.34	90
RKP	Anna-Maja Henriksson	4.90	77
KD	Sari Essayah	4.22	57
Liik	Harry Harkimo	1.81	20
VKK	Ano Turtiainen	1.29	10
Independent	N/A	0.68	8
This lists parties that won seats. See the complete results below.

The first county elections were held in Finland on 23 January 2022. Voters elected the council members of the 21 new wellbeing services counties. Residents of Helsinki were excluded from voting, as the city continues to be responsible for organizing health, social and rescue services in Helsinki. Åland was also excluded, as it is not affected by the health and social services reform.

== Electoral system ==
A total of 1379 members of the 21 councils (each council consisting of 59 to 79 members) were elected using proportional representation, with seats allocated according to the d'Hondt method.

== Opinion polls ==
Poll results are listed in the table below in reverse chronological order, showing the most recent first. The highest percentage figure in each poll is displayed in bold, and the background shaded in the leading party's colour. In the instance that there is a tie, then no figure is shaded. The table uses the date the survey's fieldwork was done, as opposed to the date of publication. However, if that date is unknown, the date of publication will be given instead. List includes only polls that were made for the municipal election.

Date	Polling Firm	KOK	SDP	PS	KESK	VIHR	VAS	SFP	KD	Others	Lead
27 December 2021 - 16 January 2022	Taloustutkimus	22.4	18.0	14.3	17.7	7.4	8.1	5.0	3.4	3.7	4.4
November 15 - 22 December 2021	Taloustutkimus	21.8	18.9	17.6	15.3	7.6	8.1	3.9	3.0	3.8	3.0

== Results ==
Election results by council seats per party. Total number of seats per council numbered. Largest party in each council shown in the map insert.

Party	Seats	Votes	%
National Coalition Party	289	401,320	21,6
Social Democratic Party	275	359,014	19,3
Centre Party	297	356,462	19,2
Finns Party	156	206,477	11,1
Left Alliance	100	148,594	8.0
Green League	90	136,961	7,4
Swedish People's Party	77	91,404	4,9
Christian Democrats	57	78,825	4,2
Movement Now	20	33,733	1,8
Power Belongs to the People	10	24,138	1,3
Independent	8	12,661	0,7
Crystal Party	0	2,458	0,1
Communist Party	0	1,842	0,1
Pirate Party	0	1,651	0,1
Liberal Party – Freedom to Choose	0	930	0,1
Animal Justice Party	0	492	0,0
Open Party	0	184	0,0
Blue Reform	0	142	0,0
Finnish People First	0	80	0,0
Citizens' Party	0	23	0,0
Invalid/blank votes		7,879	–
**Total**	**1,379**	**1,865,854**	**100**
Registered voters/turnout		3,927,728	47,5
Source: Ministry of Justice
