= 2025 Finnish county elections =

The 2025 Finnish county elections were held on 13 April 2025, the same day as the municipal elections. Representatives for the county councils were elected to decide the wellbeing services of each county. Residents of Helsinki were excluded from voting, as the city continued to be responsible for organizing health, social and rescue services in Helsinki. Åland was also excluded, as it was not affected by the health and social services reform.

== Background ==
These were the second elections of their kind following the inaugural 2022 Finnish county elections.

A poll by the Association of Finnish Local and Regional Authorities suggested that 80 percent of people in Finland planned to vote in the 2025 elections.

== Electoral system ==
A total of 1379 members of the 21 councils representing each wellbeing services county (each council consisting of 59 to 79 members) were elected using proportional representation, with seats allocated according to the D'Hondt method.

== Results ==

← Summary of the 13 April 2025 county election results
Party	Vote			Seats	
Party	Votes	%	±pp	Won	+/−
SDP	442,988	22.5	▲3.2	320	▲43
National Coalition	402,315	20.4	▼1.2	281	▼8
Centre	381,659	19.4	▲0.2	304	▲7
Left Alliance	178,857	9.1	▲1.1	117	▲17
Green	178,373	9.1	▲1.7	107	▲17
Finns	152,747	7.8	▼3.3	106	▼49
SPP	97,782	5.0	▲0.1	71	▼5
CD	94,578	4.8	▲0.6	62	▲5
Movement Now	10,149	0.5	▼1.3	4	▼16
Freedom Alliance	7,896	0.4	N/A	0	±0.0
Liberal Party – Freedom to Choose	4,473	0.2	▲0.1	0	±0.0
Communist Party	1,988	0.1	±0.0	0	±0.0
Animal Justice Party	1,455	0.1	▲0.1	0	±0.0
VKK	769	0.0	▼1.3	0	▼10
Others	11,081	0.6	N/A	7	N/A
Total valid number of votes	1,967,720	100.00	±0.0	1,379	±0
Votes cast / turnout	2,051,433	51.7	▲4.2		
