= 2023 Finnish parliamentary election =

- 2 April 2023

All 200 seats in the Parliament of Finland 101 seats needed for a majority
- Opinion polls
- Registered: 4,540,437
- Turnout: 72.6% (▼0.2 pp)
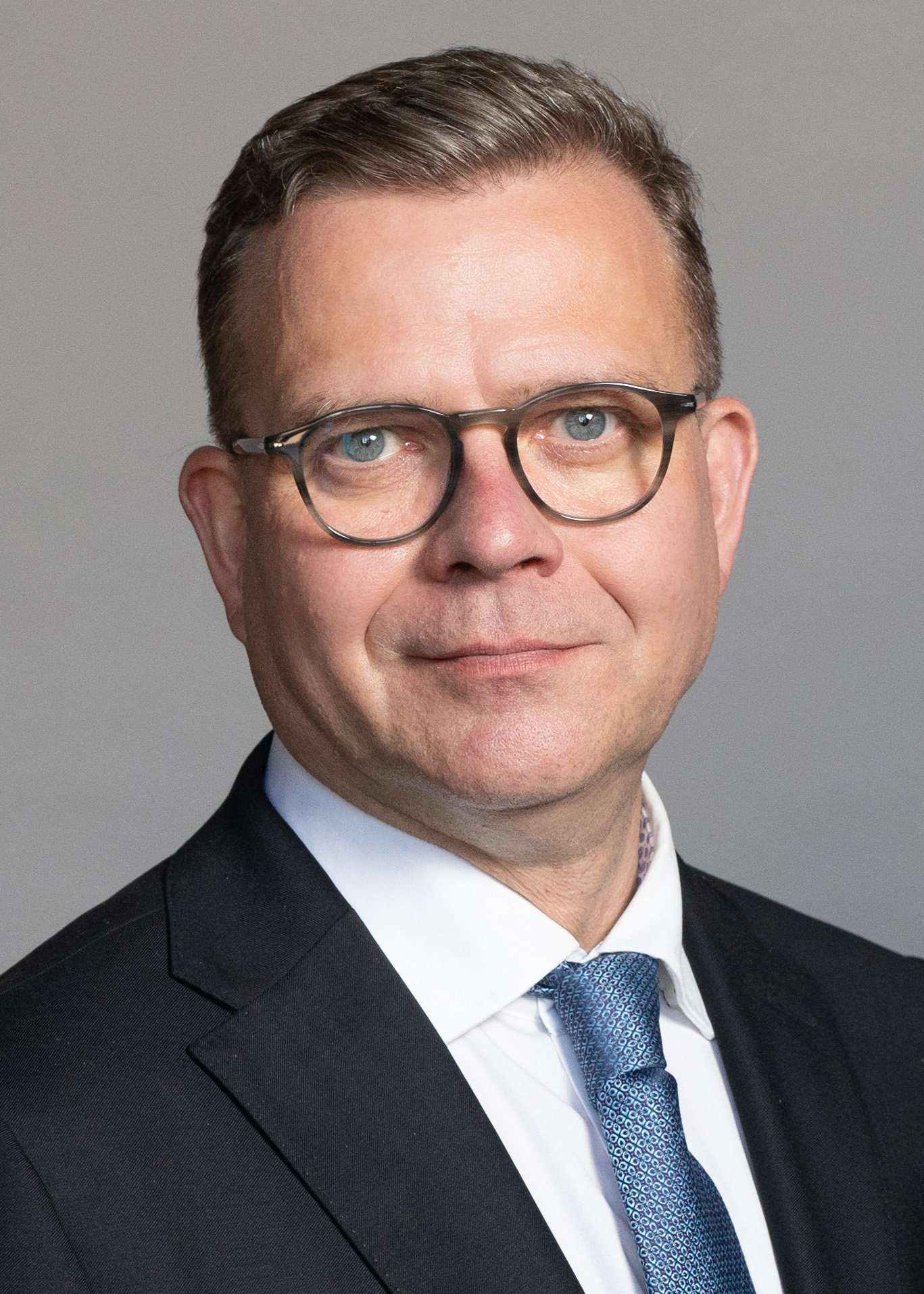

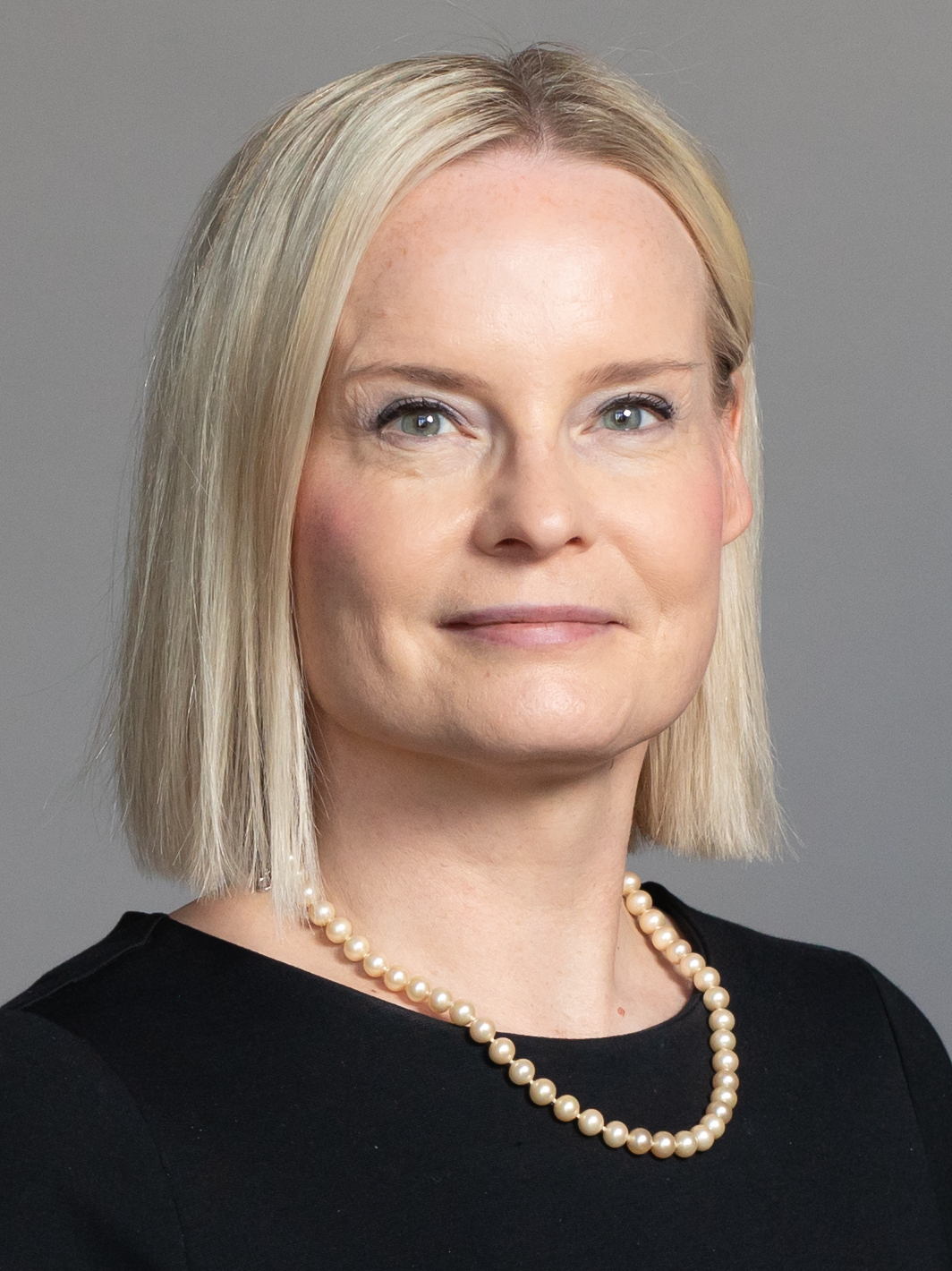

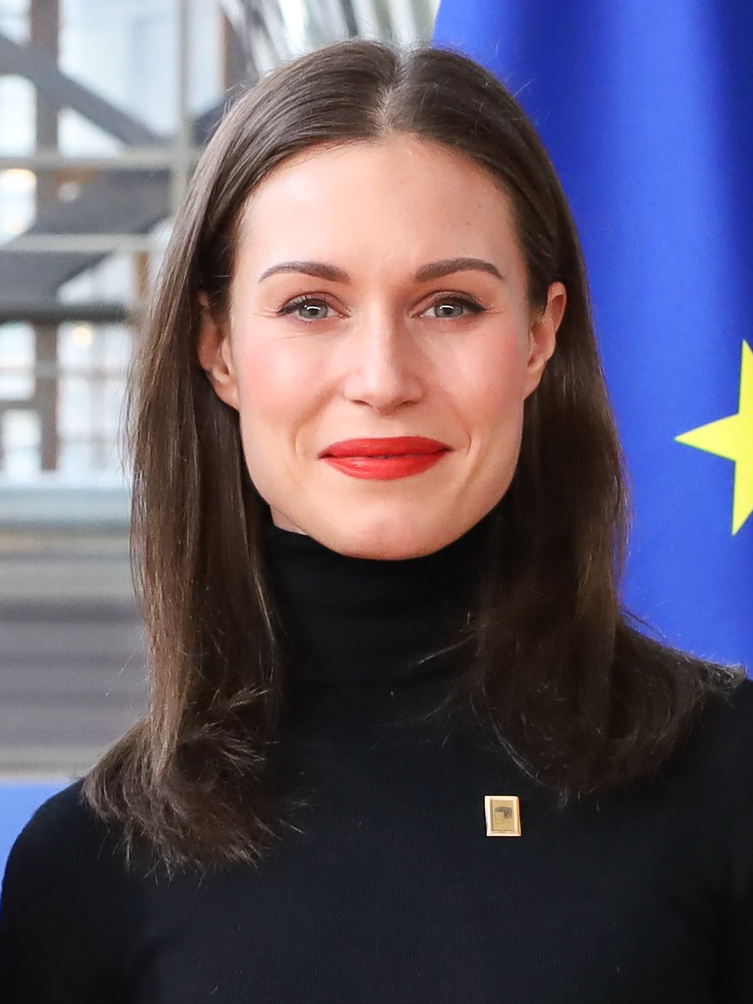

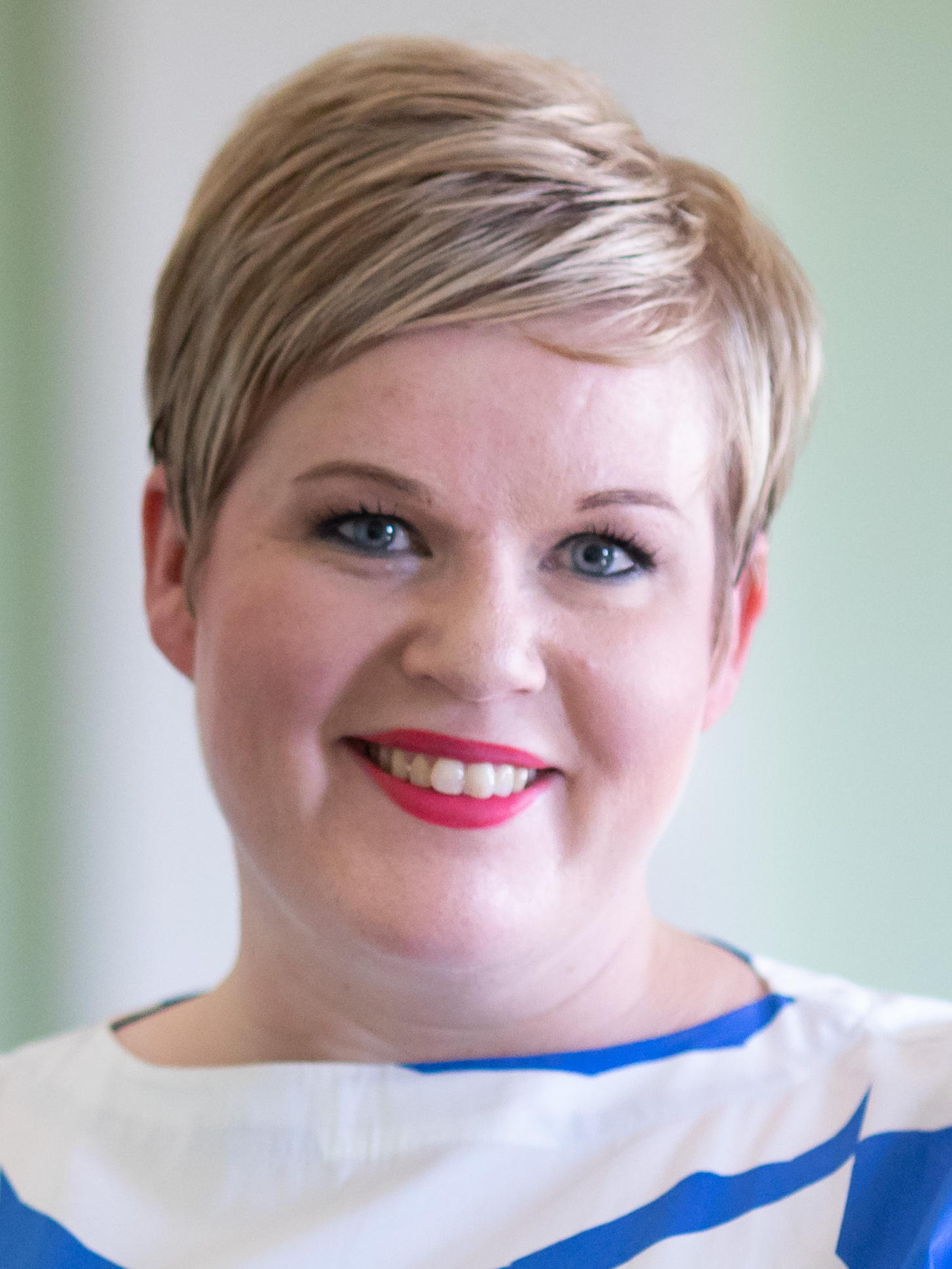

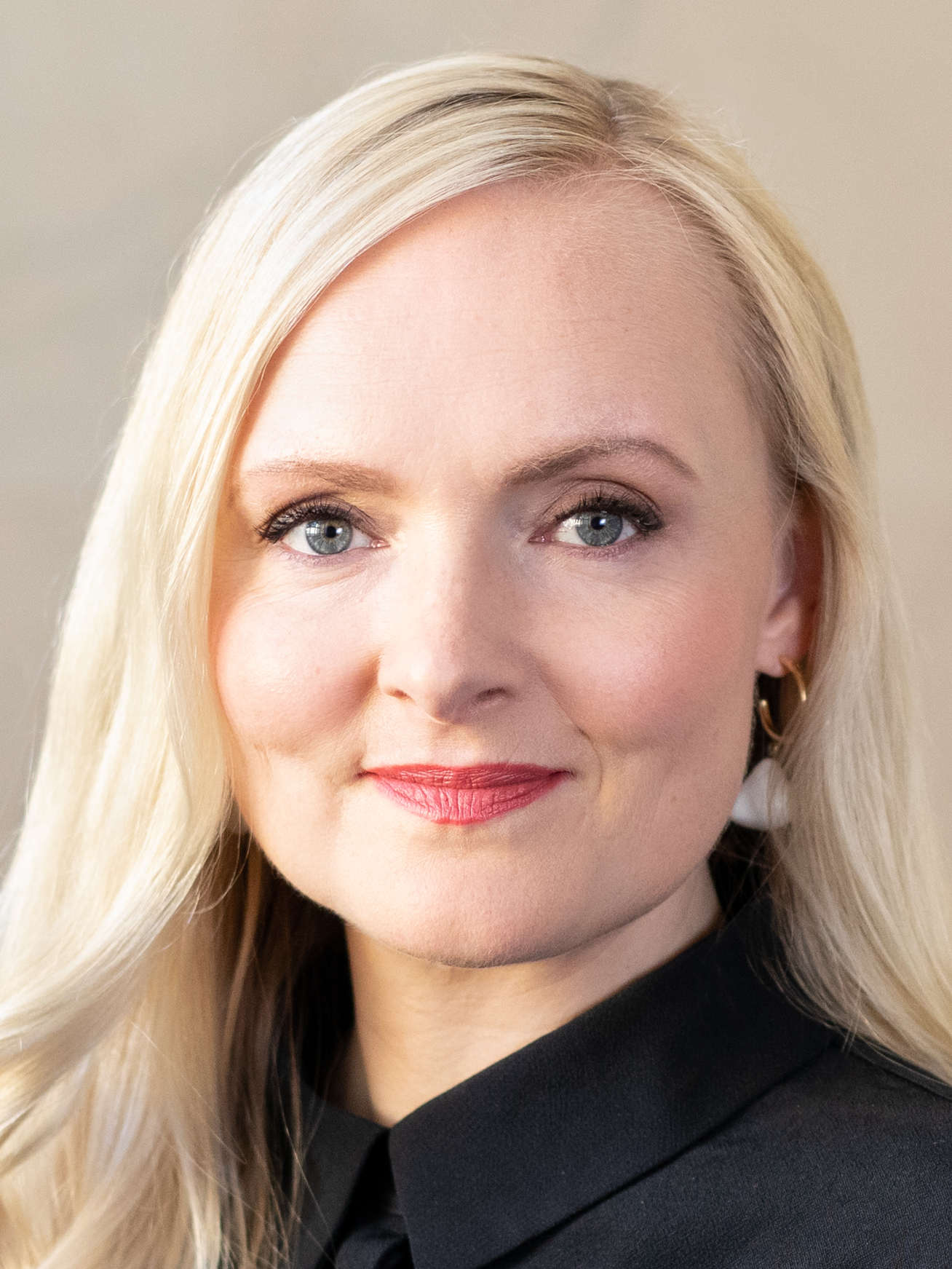

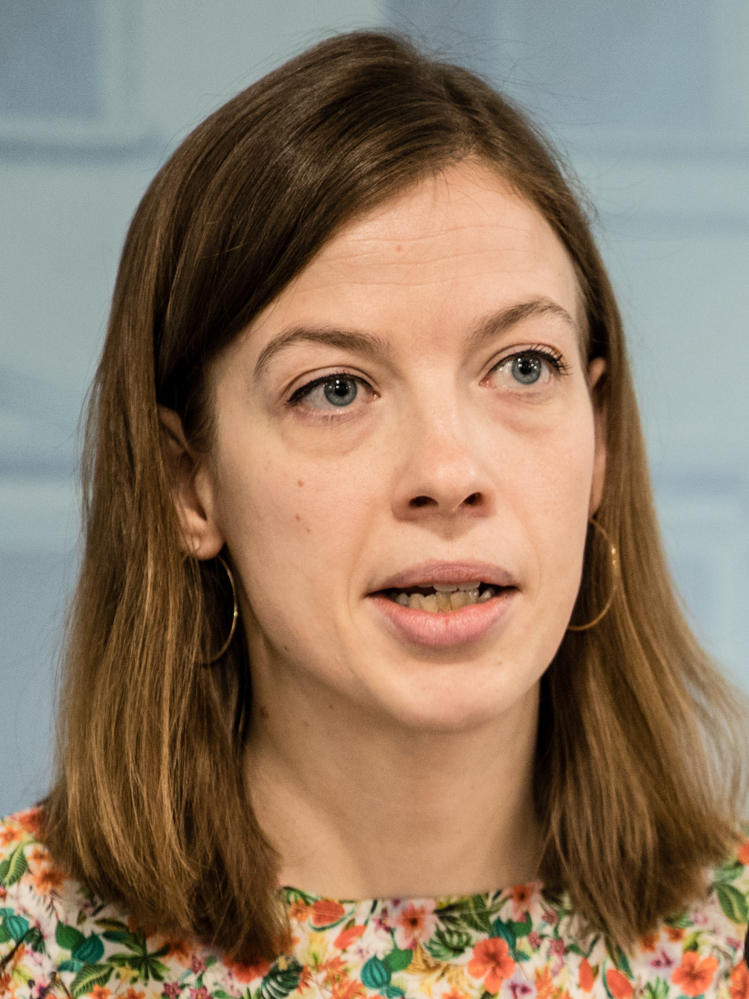

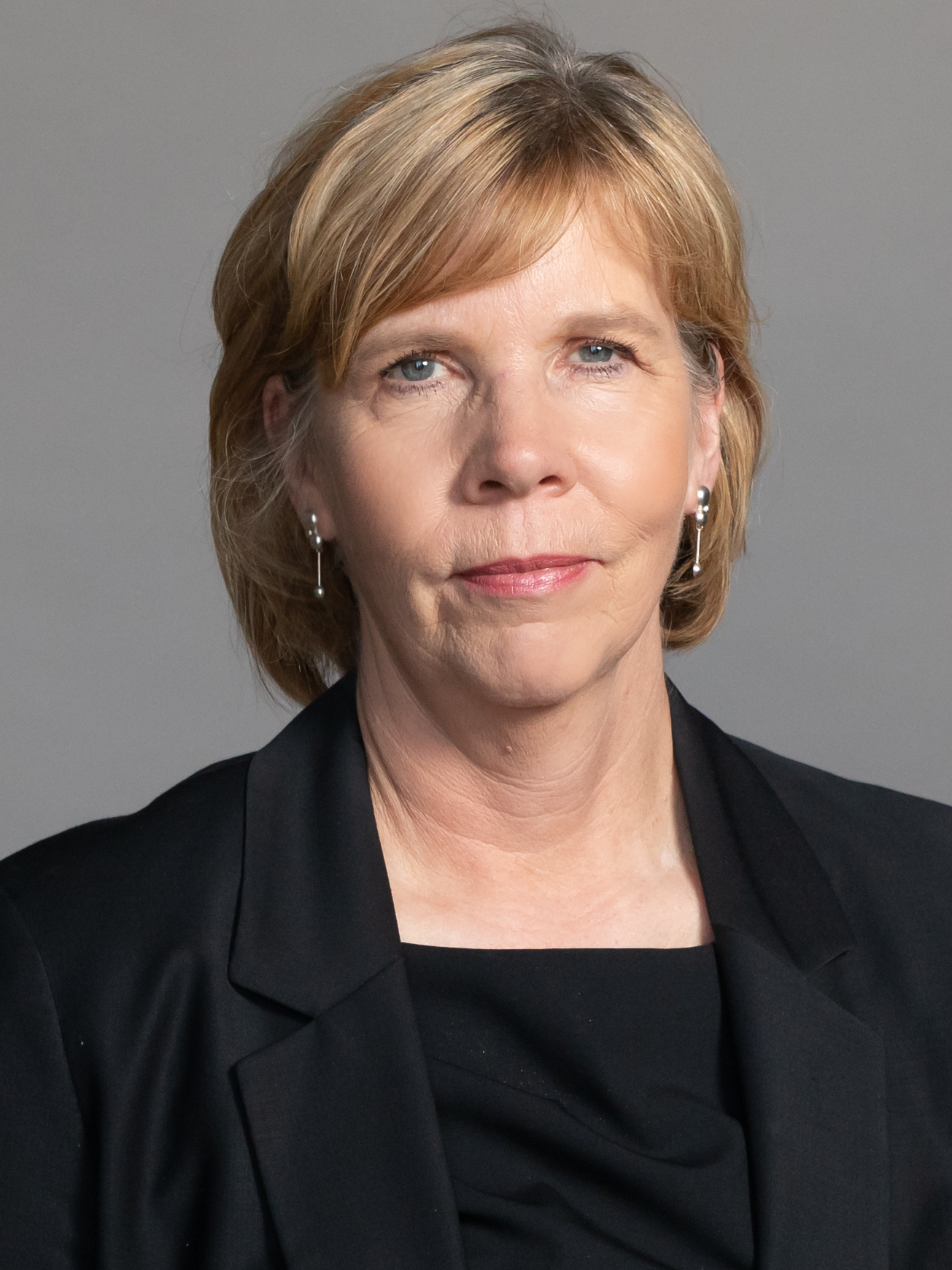

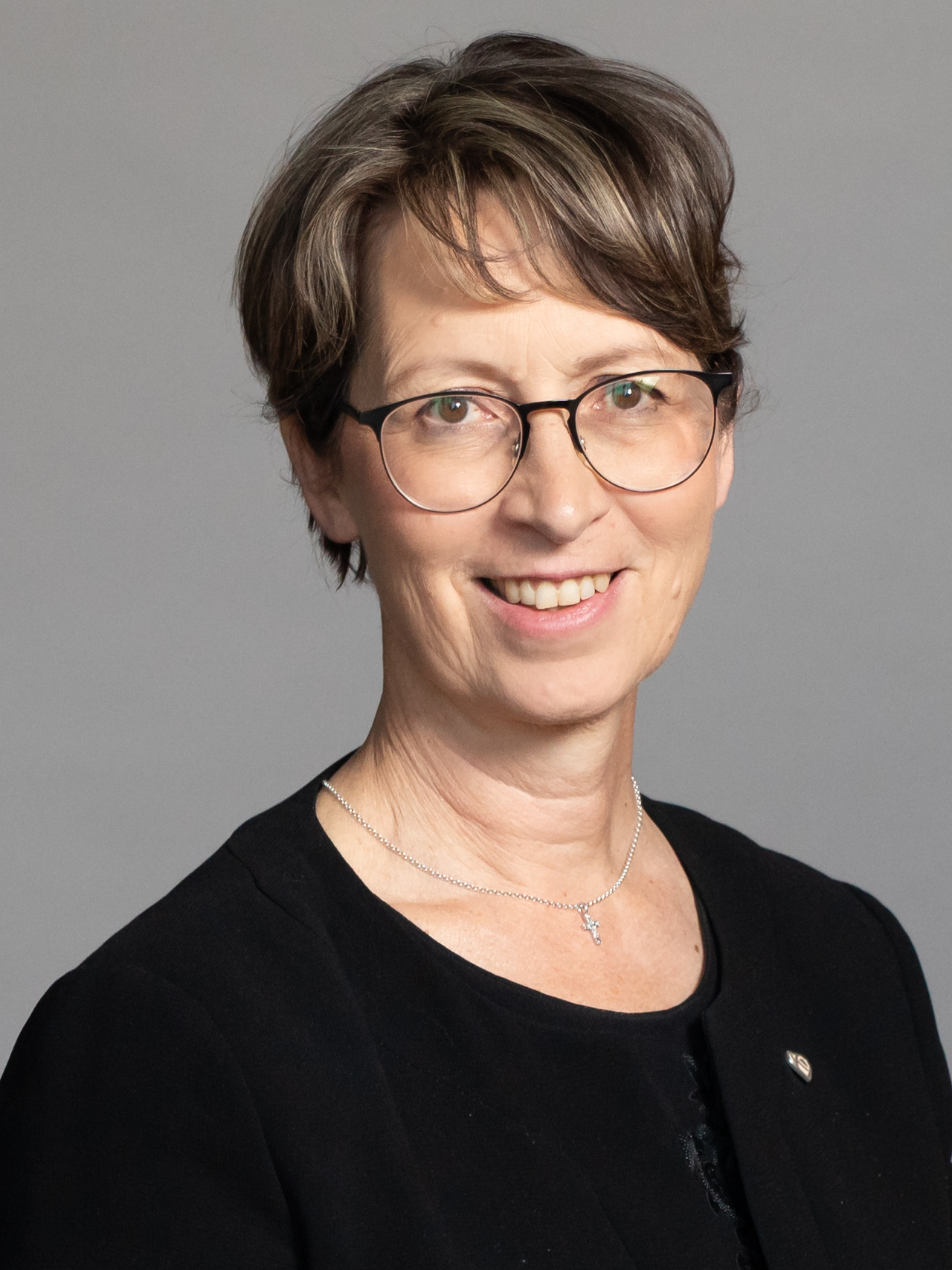

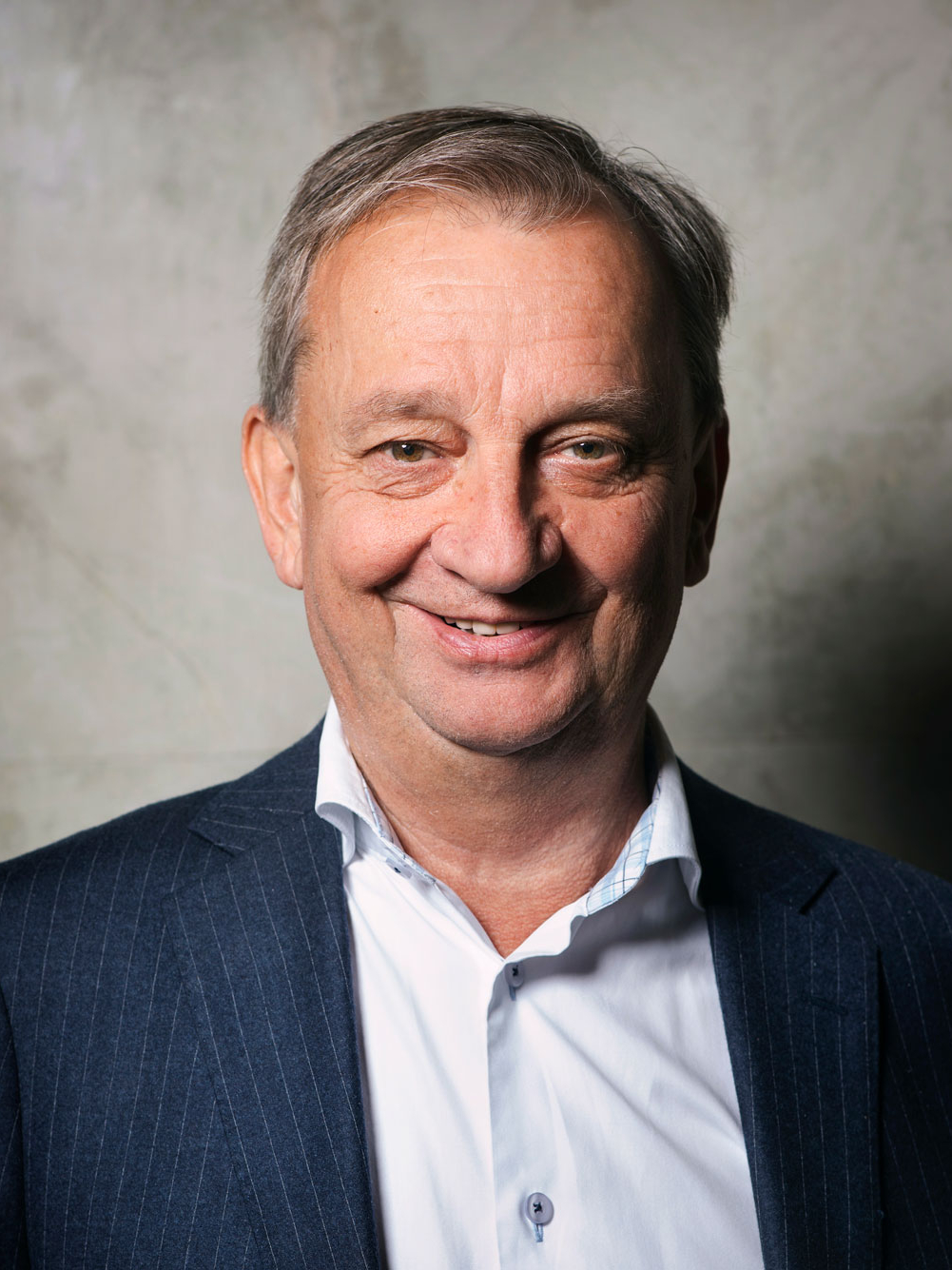
	First party	Second party	Third party
Leader	Petteri Orpo	Riikka Purra	Sanna Marin
Party	National Coalition	Finns	SDP
Last election	38 seats, 17.0%	39 seats, 17.5%	40 seats, 17.7%
Seats won	48	46	43
Seat change	▲10	▲7	▲3
Popular vote	644,555	620,981	617,552
Percentage	20.8%	20.1%	19.9%
Swing	▲3.8pp	▲2.6pp	▲2.2pp
	Fourth party	Fifth party	Sixth party
Leader	Annika Saarikko	Maria Ohisalo	Li Andersson
Party	Centre	Green	Left Alliance
Last election	31 seats, 13.8%	20 seats, 11.5%	16 seats, 8.2%
Seats won	23	13	11
Seat change	▼8	▼7	▼5
Popular vote	349,640	217,795	218,430
Percentage	11.3%	7.0%	7.1%
Swing	▼2.5pp	▼4.5pp	▼1.1pp
	Seventh party	Eighth party	Ninth party
Leader	Anna-Maja Henriksson	Sari Essayah	Harry Harkimo
Party	RKP	KD	Liik
Last election	9 seats, 4.5%	5 seats, 3.9%	1 seat, 2.3%
Seats won	9	5	1
Seat change	0	0	0
Popular vote	133,518	130,694	74,995
Percentage	4.3%	4.2%	2.4%
Swing	▼0.2pp	▲0.3pp	▲0.1pp
Prime Minister before election
Sanna Marin
SDP
Prime Minister after election
Petteri Orpo
National Coalition

Parliamentary elections were held in Finland on 2 April 2023 to elect members of the Parliament of Finland.

Following the 2019 election, the Social Democratic Party (SDP) formed a governing coalition with the Centre Party, Greens, Left Alliance, and the Swedish People's Party, with Antti Rinne serving as the prime minister of Finland. Later that year, Rinne was involved in a political scandal regarding the Finnish postal service, after which he resigned and was succeeded by Sanna Marin. Marin's government focused on issues regarding climate change, while her government also faced the COVID-19 pandemic and the Russian invasion of Ukraine. The invasion prompted her to announce that Finland would submit its candidacy to join NATO, which it did in May 2022.

Issues regarding the economy, the budget deficit, climate change, and education were discussed during the campaign period. The election programs of the opposition National Coalition Party (NCP) and Finns Party (Finns) called for budget cuts and austerity to balance the budget, while the SDP's election program focused on economic growth through investments in employment and education. Marin supported more education and public health spending, while the NCP called for balancing the budget, reducing spending on unemployment and housing benefits, and constructing more nuclear plants. The Finns campaigned on an anti-immigration and anti-European Union platform, while the Greens focused on issues regarding mental health and universal basic income. The Centre Party campaigned on regional politics.

The National Coalition Party won the election with 20.8% of the national popular vote, winning 48 seats in parliament, the third-highest result in the party's history. The Finns Party came in a close second place with the ruling Social Democratic Party of Finland under Prime Minister Marin in third place. The National Coalition Party then formed a coalition with the Finns Party, the Swedish People's Party, and the Christian Democrats, with Petteri Orpo as prime minister. For the first time in Finland's history, the Centre Party did not win a plurality of votes in any regional voting districts. Five government parties and four opposition parties finished with parliamentary seats split at 100–100. This was the first time since 1983 that the top-three finishing parties did not lose a percentage share of votes.

== Background ==
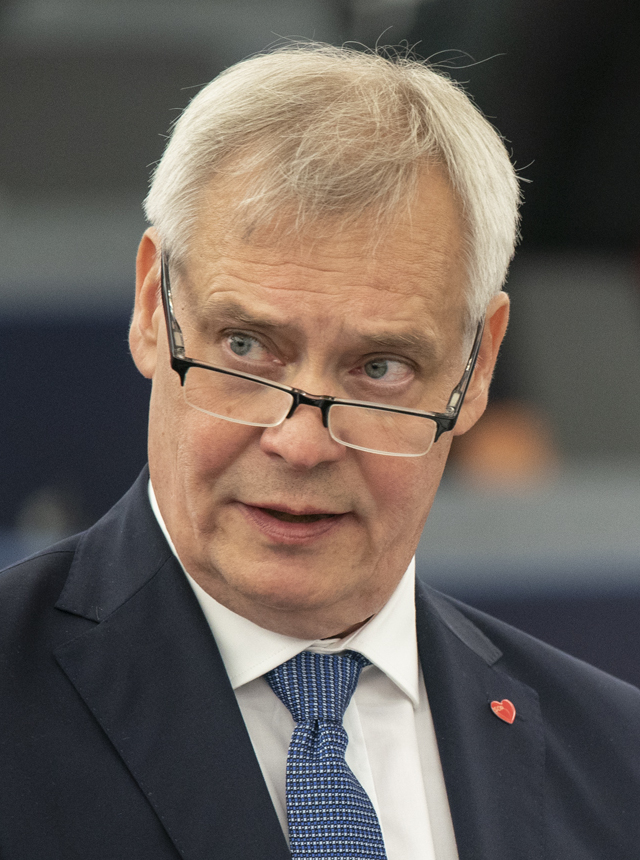
Antti Rinne resigned as prime minister following the postal service scandal in December 2019.

The previous parliamentary election, held in April 2019, saw the Social Democratic Party place first, winning 17.7% of the popular vote, followed by the Finns Party and the National Coalition Party, who won 17.5% and 17% of the popular vote, respectively. The Centre Party of the outgoing prime minister Juha Sipilä placed fourth, winning 13.8% of the popular vote, while the Green League and the Left Alliance received more votes than in the preceding election. In June 2019, after several months of negotiations, the SDP, led by Rinne, formed a government, bringing the Centre Party, Green League, Left Alliance, and the Swedish People's Party into the government.

In late 2019, a political scandal regarding the Finnish postal service broke out. Sirpa Paatero, the minister of local government and ownership steering, was accused of being aware of, and hiding from members of the Parliament of Finland, the postal service's project to change the status of a large number of its workers to a lower-paying contract. Paatero resigned in November 2019, after which Rinne was also accused of knowing of the postal service's plan. The Centre Party then left the government, which led Rinne to announce his resignation as prime minister and leader of the SDP in December 2019. He was succeeded by Sanna Marin, who, at 34, became the world's youngest serving prime minister after being sworn into office in December 2019.

The Marin Cabinet announced they would combat climate change, protect the environment, and reduce social and economic inequalities. Her government also adopted a program that would aim to make Finland carbon-neutral by 2035, by reducing greenhouse gas emissions and increasing the production of renewable energy. Following the outbreak of the COVID-19 pandemic in Finland, Marin's management of the pandemic benefited her party, which caused her to rise in opinion polls, with her personal favourable opinion rating reaching 85%. The SDP was surpassed by the Finns Party in opinion polls after April 2021, with the National Coalition Party becoming the most popular by July 2021. (Note: Polls published between 1 January 2021 and 26 April 2021 (fieldwork in brackets): Taloustutkimus (2 December 2020 – 5 January 2021); Kantar TNS (21 December 2020 – 15 January 2021); Kantar TNS (18 January 2021 – 12 February 2021); Kantar TNS (15 February 2021 – 12 March 2021); Kantar TNS (15 March 2021 – 9 April 2021))

Following the beginning of the Russian invasion of Ukraine, Marin took a firm line against Russia and Vladimir Putin, breaking Finland's historical military neutrality by announcing Finland's NATO candidacy. Finland officially submitted its candidacy in May 2022. Its path to join NATO was formalized in March 2023, when Recep Tayyip Erdoğan, the president of Turkey, formally signed and approved the decision to ratify Finland's NATO membership. Turkey was the last NATO member to ratify the decision.

== Electoral system ==
The 200 members of the Parliament of Finland (Eduskunta, Riksdagen) were elected using open list, proportional representation in 13 multi-member electoral districts, with seats allocated according to the D'Hondt method. The number of elected representatives is proportional to the population in the district six months prior to the elections. Åland has a single-member electoral district and its own party system. Every citizen who is at least 18 years old has the right to vote. Voters also had the option to vote either during the advance voting period, from March 22 to 28 March 2023, or on election day.

Seats by electoral district
Electoral district	Seats	A map of Finalnd's 13 electoral constituencies
01 Helsinki	23	A map of Finalnd's 13 electoral constituencies
02 Uusimaa	37	A map of Finalnd's 13 electoral constituencies
03 Varsinais-Suomi	17	A map of Finalnd's 13 electoral constituencies
04 Satakunta	8	A map of Finalnd's 13 electoral constituencies
05 Åland	1	A map of Finalnd's 13 electoral constituencies
06 Häme	14	A map of Finalnd's 13 electoral constituencies
07 Pirkanmaa	20	A map of Finalnd's 13 electoral constituencies
08 Southeast Finland	15	A map of Finalnd's 13 electoral constituencies
09 Savo-Karelia	15	A map of Finalnd's 13 electoral constituencies
10 Vaasa	16	A map of Finalnd's 13 electoral constituencies
11 Central Finland	10	A map of Finalnd's 13 electoral constituencies
12 Oulu	18	A map of Finalnd's 13 electoral constituencies
13 Lapland	6	A map of Finalnd's 13 electoral constituencies

=== Pre-election composition ===
Government	Seats
Social Democratic Party of Finland	40
Centre Party	31
Green League	20
Left Alliance	16
Swedish People's Party of Finland	10
Opposition	Seats
Finns Party	39
National Coalition Party	37
Christian Democrats	5
Movement Now	1
Power Belongs to the People	1
Source: Parliament of Finland

== Contesting parties ==
The table below lists parties and independent candidates that contested the 2023 Finnish parliamentary election. The Election Information and Results Service announced that 2,424 candidates in total registered to take part in the election.

Overview of contesting parties in the 2023 Finnish parliamentary election
Party	Ideology	Candidates by electoral district													
Party	Ideology	Helsinki	Uusimaa	Varsinais-Suomi	Satakunta	Åland	Häme	Pirkanmaa	South-East Finland	Savo-Karelia	Vaasa	Central Finland	Oulu	Lapland	Total
Party	Ideology	293	485	214	124	15	144	239	158	156	161	146	177	112	2424
Social Democratic Party	Social democracy	23	37	17	14	—N/a	14	20	15	15	16	14	18	14	217
Finns Party	Right-wing populism	23	37	17	14	—N/a	14	20	15	15	16	14	18	14	217
Green League	Green liberalism	23	37	17	14	—N/a	14	20	15	15	16	14	18	14	217
Left Alliance	Democratic socialism	23	37	17	14	—N/a	14	20	15	15	16	14	18	14	217
National Coalition	Liberal conservatism	23	37	17	14	—N/a	14	19 (Note: National Coalition Party–Swedish People's Party of Finland electoral alliance)	14	15	16	14	18	11 (Note: National Coalition Party–Christian Democrats electoral alliance)	212
Centre Party	Agrarianism	11 (Note: Centre Party–Christian Democrats–Finnish Reform Movement electoral alliance)	37	17	14	—N/a	14	20	15	15	16	14	18	14	205
Christian Democrats	Christian democracy	8	37	17	14	—N/a	14	20	15	15	16	14	15 (Note: Christian Democrats–Finnish Reform Movement electoral alliance)	3	188
Movement Now	Economic liberalism	23	37	17	10	—N/a	14	20	15	13	10	5	11	2	177
Freedom Alliance	National conservatism	16 (Note: Finnish People First–Freedom Alliance–Crystal Party electoral alliance)	32	15	9	—N/a	7	11	10	10	10	8	11	4	143
Swedish People's Party of Finland	Swedish-speaking minority interests liberalism	23	37	17	3	—N/a	5	1	1	2	16	1	4	1	111
Power Belongs to the People	Ultranationalism	10	25	11	2	—N/a	7	4	9	8	5	14	8	4	107
Liberal Party – Freedom to Choose	Classical liberalism	23	21	11	—N/a	—N/a	5	12	4	5	4	—N/a	6	2	93
Blue-and-Black Movement	Neo-fascism	—N/a	37	17	—N/a	—N/a	—N/a	20	—N/a	—N/a	—N/a	14	—N/a	—N/a	88
Communist Party of Finland	Communism	14	13	2	—N/a	—N/a	1	9	6	5	1	4	4	6	65
Pirate Party	Pirate politics	20	5	—N/a	1	—N/a	1	5	—N/a	4	—N/a	1	—N/a	—N/a	37
Crystal Party	Vaccine hesitancy	5	3	1	—N/a	—N/a	2	3	4	2	2	1	5	—N/a	28
Animal Justice Party of Finland	Animal rights	4 (Note: Feminist Party–Animal Justice Party of Finland electoral alliance)	4	3	—N/a	—N/a	1	7	—N/a	1	—N/a	—N/a	—N/a	—N/a	20
Finnish Reform Movement	National conservatism	4	4	—N/a	—N/a	—N/a	—N/a	—N/a	5	—N/a	—N/a	—N/a	3	—N/a	16
Feminist Party	Feminism	6	4	—N/a	—N/a	—N/a	—N/a	3	—N/a	—N/a	—N/a	—N/a	—N/a	—N/a	13
Finnish People First	Finnish nationalism	2	1	—N/a	1	—N/a	3	1	—N/a	—N/a	—N/a	—N/a	2	—N/a	10
The Open Party	E-democracy	8	—N/a	—N/a	—N/a	—N/a	—N/a	—N/a	—N/a	—N/a	—N/a	—N/a	—N/a	1	9
Lapland's Non-Aligned Joint List	Regionalism	—N/a	—N/a	—N/a	—N/a	—N/a	—N/a	—N/a	—N/a	—N/a	—N/a	—N/a	—N/a	8	8
Non-aligned Coalition	Conservatism	—N/a	—N/a	—N/a	—N/a	4	—N/a	—N/a	—N/a	—N/a	—N/a	—N/a	—N/a	—N/a	4
Welfare and Equality	Social democracy	—N/a	—N/a	—N/a	—N/a	4	—N/a	—N/a	—N/a	—N/a	—N/a	—N/a	—N/a	—N/a	4
Sustainable Initiative	Green politics	—N/a	—N/a	—N/a	—N/a	4	—N/a	—N/a	—N/a	—N/a	—N/a	—N/a	—N/a	—N/a	4
Citizens' Union	Euroscepticism	—N/a	1	—N/a	—N/a	—N/a	—N/a	1	—N/a	—N/a	1	—N/a	—N/a	—N/a	3
For Åland	Regionalism	—N/a	—N/a	—N/a	—N/a	3	—N/a	—N/a	—N/a	—N/a	—N/a	—N/a	—N/a	—N/a	3
Independent candidates	–	1	2	1	—N/a	—N/a	—N/a	3	—N/a	1	—N/a	—N/a	—N/a	—N/a	8

== Campaign ==
=== Issues ===
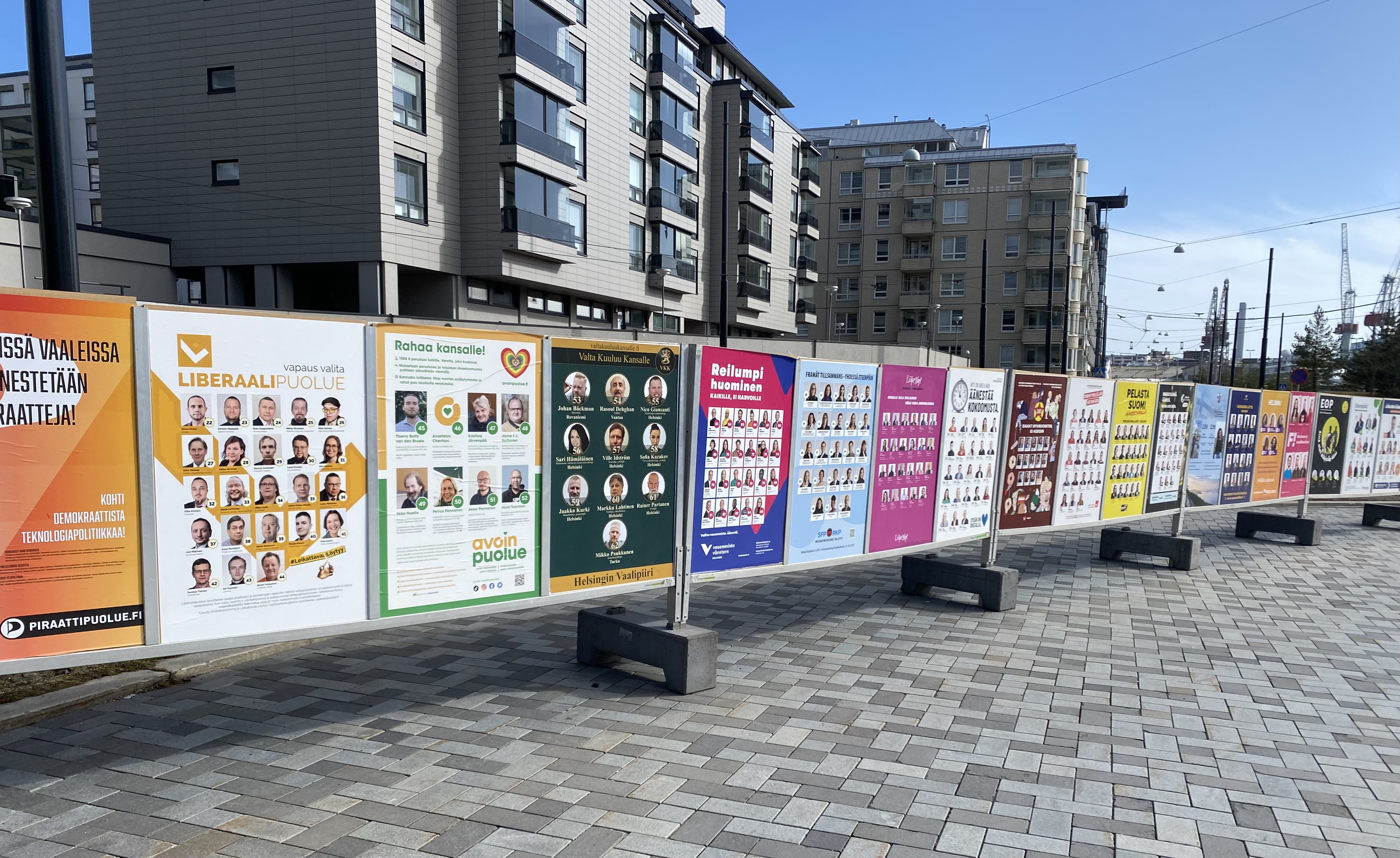
Campaign posters in Helsinki in March 2023

Yle cited government borrowing, sustainability of public finances, climate change, and educational decline as main issues during the electoral campaign. Paul Kirby of BBC News noted that the Russian invasion of Ukraine has had "little campaign impact", and added that the campaign was instead concentrated on issues regarding the economy. Deutsche Welle cited a shortage of workers as a key issue, while the Associated Press mentioned that issues regarding the economy, climate change, education, and social benefits were discussed during the campaign. Markku Jokisipilä, an assistant professor at the University of Turku, said that in the debates, Marin has "stood out vigorously". He added that the Finns Party had the strongest social media presence. Teivo Teivainen, a professor at the University of Helsinki, said that opponents of the SDP see the main problem as public spending. News agencies described the election as a close race between the SDP, National Coalition Party, and the Finns Party. Jenni Karimäki, a political historian, who works at the University of Helsinki, said that "nobody can know what order the three leading parties will finish in on Sunday."

The Finns Party, which campaigned on an anti-immigration and anti-European Union (EU) platform, cited as their priority cutting immigration from non-EU countries. Petteri Orpo, the leader of the National Coalition Party, campaigned on reducing spending on unemployment and housing benefits. While campaigning, Orpo stated his support for economic growth, balancing the public economy, "building up NATO-Finland", and constructing more nuclear plants. Riikka Purra, the leader of the Finns Party, called for austerity, and said that "we also want to tighten up our attitude towards the European Union." She added that the Finns Party would delay the carbon neutrality target that was introduced by Marin's government. The National Coalition Party agreed with Marin's position on carbon neutrality. Marin remained critical of right-wing parties, saying that they offered "an alternative that makes life miserable for all of us, cuts services, cuts livelihoods for the poorest"; she had also stated her support for education and public health spending, saying that it would help Finland to avoid borrowing. The Green League's campaign was focused on mental health services and universal basic income. The Centre Party campaigned on regional politics.

=== Slogans ===
Slogans of parliamentary parties during the campaign period
Party/coalition	Original slogan	English translation	Refs
Centre Party	Eteenpäin! Vastuuta koko Suomesta	Forwards! Responsibility for the whole Finland	
Christian Democrats	Järjen ääni Suomeen suunnanmuutos	The voice of reason Change of course for Finland	
Finns Party	Pelasta Suomi!	Save Finland!	
Green League	Suojele elämää	Protect life	
Left Alliance	Reilumpi huominen kaikille, ei harvoille	A fairer tomorrow for everyone, not just for the few!	
Movement Now	Uskalla olla erilainen	Dare to be different	
National Coalition	Nyt on oikea aika	Now is the right time	
Power Belongs to the People	Täysivaltaista tasavaltaa jälleenrakentamassa	Rebuilding a sovereign republic	
Social Democratic Party	Rohkeutta olla sinun puolellasi	Courage to be on your side	
Swedish People's Party of Finland	Yhdessä eteenpäin (Swedish: Framåt tillsammans)	Moving forward together	

=== Debates ===
Debates during the campaign period
2023 Finnish parliamentary election debates
Date	Organisers	P Present N Non-invitee									
Date	Organisers	SDP	Finns	KOK	Centre	Green League	Vas	SFP/RKP	KD	Liik	Refs
30 March	Yle	P Sanna Marin	P Riikka Purra	P Petteri Orpo	P Annika Saarikko	P Maria Ohisalo	P Li Andersson	P Anna-Maja Henriksson	P Sari Essayah	P Hjallis Harkimo	
27 March	Yle	P Sanna Marin	P Riikka Purra	P Petteri Orpo	P Annika Saarikko	P Maria Ohisalo	P Li Andersson	P Anna-Maja Henriksson	P Sari Essayah	P Hjallis Harkimo	
23 March	Yle	N	N	N	P Annika Saarikko	P Maria Ohisalo	P Li Andersson	N	N	N	
22 March	Yle	N	N	N	N	N	N	P Anna-Maja Henriksson	P Sari Essayah	P Hjallis Harkimo	
21 March	Yle	P Sanna Marin	P Riikka Purra	P Petteri Orpo	N	N	N	N	N	N	
20 March	Yle	P Sanna Marin	P Riikka Purra	P Petteri Orpo	P Annika Saarikko	P Maria Ohisalo	P Li Andersson	P Anna-Maja Henriksson	P Sari Essayah	P Hjallis Harkimo	
8 March	Unifi	P Antti Lindtman	P Sakari Puisto	P Paula Risikko	P Petri Honkonen	P Maria Ohisalo	P Li Andersson	P Anders Adlercreutz	P Sari Essayah	N	
6 March	YVV	P Anita Hellman	P Sakari Puisto	P Pihla Keto-Huovinen	P Päivi Mononen-Mikkilä	P Amanda Pasanen	P Veronika Honkasalo	P Eva Biaudet	N	P Karoliina Kähönen	

== Members of Parliament standing down ==
=== Centre Party ===
- Hannakaisa Heikkinen
- Esko Kiviranta
- Jari Leppä
- Juha Pylväs
- Juha Sipilä
- Matti Vanhanen
- Anu Vehviläinen
- Hannakaisa Heikkinen

=== Christian Democrats ===
- Antero Laukkanen

=== Finns Party ===
- Teuvo Hakkarainen
- Toimi Kankaanniemi
- Riikka Slunga-Poutsalo
- Veikko Vallin

=== Green League ===
- Outi Alanko-Kahiluoto
- Satu Hassi
- Heli Järvinen
- Emma Kari
- Pirkka-Pekka Petelius

=== Left Alliance ===
- Juho Kautto
- Markus Mustajärvi
- Jari Myllykoski

=== National Coalition Party ===
- Kalle Jokinen
- Jaana Pelkonen
- Ruut Sjöblom
- Kari Tolvanen

=== Social Democratic Party ===
- Jukka Gustafsson
- Anneli Kiljunen
- Merja Mäkisalo-Ropponen
- Raimo Piirainen
- Kristiina Salonen
- Katja Taimela
- Erkki Tuomioja

=== Swedish People's Party ===
- Veronica Rehn-Kivi

== Opinion polls ==
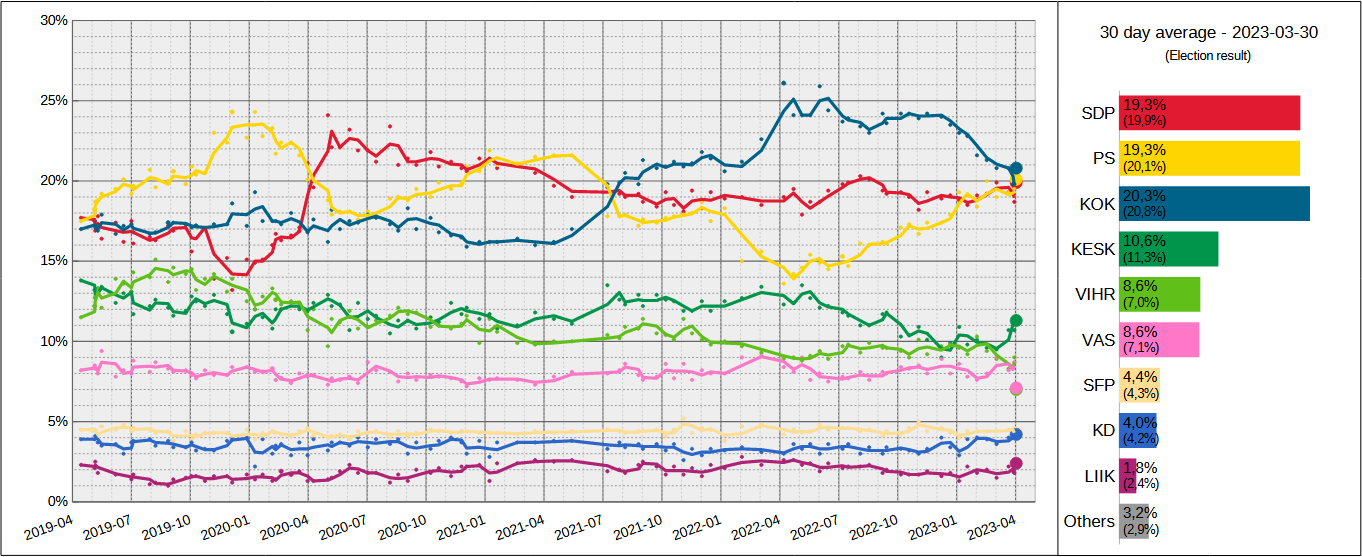
Local regression chart of poll results from 14 April 2019 to 2 April 2023

== Results ==
During the advance voting period, 40% of eligible voters cast their ballots, the highest since the introduction of advance voting. Voting stations on April 2 were opened from 9:00 (UTC+03:00) a.m. to 8:00 pm. There were 4,277,487 citizens who had the right to vote in the election.

Party	Votes	%	+/–	Seats	+/–
National Coalition Party	644,555	20.82	+3.82	48	+10
Finns Party	620,981	20.06	+2.58	46	+7
Social Democratic Party	617,552	19.95	+2.22	43	+3
Centre Party	349,640	11.29	–2.47	23	–8
Left Alliance	218,430	7.06	–1.11	11	–5
Green League	217,795	7.04	–4.45	13	–7
Swedish People's Party	133,518	4.31	–0.22	9	0
Christian Democrats	130,694	4.22	+0.32	5	0
Movement Now	74,995	2.42	+0.17	1	0
Freedom Alliance	27,558	0.89	New	0	New
Liberal Party – Freedom to Choose	14,982	0.48	+0.32	0	0
For Åland	11,452	0.37	–0.01	1	0
Power Belongs to the People	8,469	0.27	New	0	New
Crystal Party	4,894	0.16	New	0	New
Animal Justice Party	3,107	0.10	–0.01	0	0
Pirate Party	3,058	0.10	–0.52	0	0
Communist Party	3,044	0.10	–0.04	0	0
Blue-and-Black Movement	2,307	0.07	New	0	New
Finnish Reform Movement	1,362	0.04	–0.93	0	0
Finnish People First	1,225	0.04	–0.04	0	0
Lapland's Non-Aligned Joint List	1,231	0.04	New	0	New
Feminist Party	1,114	0.04	–0.18	0	0
The Open Party	985	0.03	New	0	New
Welfare and Equality	923	0.03	New	0	New
Non-aligned Coalition	514	0.02	New	0	New
Sustainable Initiative	494	0.02	New	0	New
Citizens' Union	169	0.01	–0.07	0	0
Independents	556	0.02	–0.19	0	0
Total	3,095,604	100.00	–	200	0
Valid votes	3,095,604	99.54			
Invalid/blank votes	14,434	0.46			
Total votes	3,110,038	100.00			
Registered voters/turnout	4,277,487	72.71			
Source: Election Information and Results Service

=== By electoral district ===
Parties' vote share in each constituency

Results of the election by bloc between the Government and the Opposition in each municipality

Electoral district	KOK		PS		SDP		KESK		VIHR		VAS		SFP		KD		Liik		Å	
Electoral district	%	S	%	S	%	S	%	S	%	S	%	S	%	S	%	S	%	S	%	S
Helsinki	26.41	7	11.29	3	20.93	5	1.57	—N/a	15.31	4	11.80	3	5.07	1	1.90	—N/a	2.30	—N/a	—N/a	
Uusimaa	26.21	11	18.17	7	19.88	8	4.77	2	7.64	3	4.56	1	8.66	3	3.49	1	3.73	1	—N/a	
Varsinais-Suomi	23.02	5	19.98	4	18.13	3	8.40	1	6.96	1	11.55	2	4.96	1	2.82	—N/a	2.35	—N/a	—N/a	
Satakunta	17.04	2	26.65	3	24.60	2	13.91	1	2.70	—N/a	8.28	—N/a	0.35	—N/a	3.21	—N/a	1.75	—N/a	—N/a	
Åland	—N/a																		85.57	1
Häme	21.50	3	24.42	4	23.71	4	8.64	1	4.74	—N/a	5.87	1	0.27	—N/a	5.52	1	3.14	—N/a	—N/a	
Pirkanmaa	21.47	5	20.16	5	25.85	6	7.10	1	7.50	1	6.87	1	0.30	—N/a	5.46	1	2.55	—N/a	—N/a	
Southeast Finland	21.96	4	22.76	4	23.67	4	13.59	2	5.13	1	3.75	—N/a	0.21	—N/a	3.51	—N/a	3.51	—N/a	—N/a	
Savo-Karelia	16.35	3	20.04	3	19.12	3	19.70	3	5.66	1	5.47	1	0.06	—N/a	9.82	1	2.09	—N/a	—N/a	
Vaasa	14.22	2	21.27	4	11.74	2	17.93	3	2.73	—N/a	2.42	—N/a	19.27	4	6.93	1	1.50	—N/a	—N/a	
Central Finland	16.26	2	20.46	2	22.81	3	17.74	2	7.62	1	6.52	—N/a	0.12	—N/a	5.29	—N/a	1.33	—N/a	—N/a	
Oulu	14.99	3	25.47	5	13.75	2	25.04	5	5.03	1	9.44	2	0.19	—N/a	2.75	—N/a	1.07	—N/a	—N/a	
Lapland	12.23	1	26.76	2	18.06	1	24.84	2	3.46	—N/a	9.94	—N/a	0.30	—N/a	1.10	—N/a	0.65	—N/a	—N/a	
Total	20.82	48	20.06	46	19.95	43	11.29	23	7.06	13	7.04	11	4.31	9	4.22	5	2.42	1	0.37	1
Source Election Information and Results Service

== Government formation ==
Before the election, the Social Democratic Party, Green League, and the Left Alliance ruled out joining a coalition that involved the Finns Party. The Swedish People's Party similarly stated that they were unlikely to align with the Finns but did not rule the possibility out completely. According to Swedish People's Party leader Anna-Maja Henriksson, her party wanted to see how government talks would go before making a final decision. The Left Alliance also stated that they were not ready to enter a coalition that involved the National Coalition Party. At the beginning of March 2023, Centre Party leader Annika Saarikko stated that even though she was not ruling out a coalition with any party, she was not willing to continue remaining in the incumbent coalition government due to policy disputes with other coalition parties, especially the Green League. National Coalition Party leader Petteri Orpo said he was keeping his options open. News agencies predicted that if his party was the largest, he would need to team up with the Finns Party or the Social Democratic Party, along with smaller parties, to get a majority.

After the immediate results of the election, the incumbent coalition did not have an absolute majority in parliament. The results showed that Orpo had to face difficult options, as his party differed from the Finns on immigration, climate, and EU membership status. Additionally, forming a coalition with them was said to be difficult because some parties had already ruled out a coalition with the Finns. On the other hand, he vowed to replace the economic policy of the Social Democrats. At that point, it was widely anticipated that the Centre Party, Green League, and Left Alliance would prefer to go into opposition rather than join a new coalition. This left the Swedish People's Party and Christian Democrats, which held their ground, as likely coalition partners. The media reported that Orpo was leaning towards talks with the Finns Party first, but also that he was sending out a questionnaire to each of the other parties to assess their positions on various topics.

On 4 April 2023, the leader of the Social Democratic Party, Sanna Marin, announced that she had resigned as chairwoman of her party, but remained a lawmaker in parliament. Centre Party leader Annika Saarikko confirmed that the Centre Party's place was in the opposition following the party's election losses. Green League party leader Maria Ohisalo made similar statements, citing monetary cuts to education, insufficiently countering climate change, and nature loss as major concerns. Swedish People's Party leader Anna-Maja Henriksson said she did not rule out joining a coalition with the Finns Party, but stated that she opposed the policies and values that the Finns pursue. Christian Democratic leader Sari Essayah said she was open to joining a coalition led by the National Coalition if the coalition agreed to implement major structural reforms in the labour markets and social security system. Based on the answers and initial talks with all parties, Orpo announced that he would negotiate forming a government with the Finns Party, Swedish People's Party, and the Christian Democrats.

Petteri Orpo announced on 15 June that the four parties had agreed to establish a four-party coalition government, which would include the far-right Finns Party. The composition of the government, the assignment of nineteen ministerial posts, was announced on 17 June. The National Coalition received eight posts, the Finns Party seven, and the Swedish People's Party three, with the remaining one going to the Christian Democrats.

== See also ==
- 2024 Finnish presidential election
- 2023 Ålandic legislative election
