= 2025 Finnish municipal elections =

The 2025 Finnish municipal elections were held on 13 April 2025, the same day as the county elections. On that day, the representatives for the 308 municipal councils were elected.

== Background ==
A poll by the Association of Finnish Local and Regional Authorities suggested that 80 percent of people in Finland planned to vote in the 2025 elections.

== Electoral system ==
The right to vote in municipal elections is determined by the municipality in which a person is registered fifty-one days before the election. In addition, they must be at least 18 years old by election day and meet one of the following conditions:

- Finnish citizen
- Citizen of another EU member state who resides in a municipality of Finland
- Citizen of a country other than the above who has had a continuous residence in a municipality of Finland for at least 2 years (i.e. 51 days before election day)
- Employed by an EU or international organisation operating in Finland and residing in a municipality of Finland on the 51st day before election day, provided that their information has been stored in the Finnish population data information system at their request and that they have notified the Digital and Population Data Services Agency in writing no later than the fifty-second day before election day that they wish to exercise their right to vote in the upcoming municipal elections.

== Results ==

The center-left SDP saw major gains in the election, while the right-wing populist Finns Party saw major losses. It was reported that the Finns party lost votes due to its government support for austerity, while the voters of the center-right NCP approve of the government policy. This was the first time SDP topped the polls in municipal elections since the 2004 elections.

=== National results ===
← Summary of the 13 April 2025 municipal election results
Party	Vote			Seats	
Party	Votes	%	±pp	Won	+/−
SDP	557,770	23.1	▲5.3	1,699	▲248
National Coalition	529,542	21.9	▲0.5	1,592	▲40
Centre	396,630	16.4	▲1.5	2,623	▲178
Green	254,173	10.5	▼0.1	418	▼15
Left Alliance	224,005	9.3	▲1.3	536	▲28
Finns	184,616	7.6	▼6.8	651	▼700
RKP	112,922	4.7	▼0.3	452	▼11
KD	86,431	3.6	±0.0	299	▼12
Movement Now	10,481	0.4	▼1.2	19	▼30
Liberal Party – Freedom to Choose	5,971	0.2	▲0.2	1	▲1
Freedom Alliance	5,513	0.2	N/A	0	±0.0
Communist Party	1,121	0.0	±0.0	0	±0.0
Open Party	680	0.0	±0.0	0	±0.0
Animal Justice Party	546	0.0	N/A	0	±0.0
VKK	364	0.0	N/A	0	±0.0
Others	48,295	2.0	▼0.1	296	▲4
Total	2,419,350	100.0	–	8,586	▼273
Valid votes	2,419,350	98.4	▼1.1		
Rejected votes	39,187	1.6	▲1.1		
Total votes	2,458,537	100.0			
Registered voters/turnout	4,530,989	54.3	▼0.8		

=== Individual municipalities ===
==== Helsinki ====
In the capital city of Helsinki, the National Coalition narrowly managed to retain their top spot despite a dramatic increase in voting share for the SDP. The SDP managed to tie the National Coalition in seat number despite finishing with a slightly lower percentage of the vote.

← Summary of the 13 April 2025 municipal election results in Helsinki
Party	Vote			Seats	
Party	Votes	%	±pp	Won	+/−
National Coalition	81,879	24.0	▼1.6	21	▼2
SDP	79,505	23.3	▲8.9	21	▲8
Green	61,186	17.9	▼2.0	16	▼2
Left Alliance	58,195	17.0	▲4.3	15	▲4
Finns	18,687	5.5	▼4.7	4	▼5
RKP	17,788	5.2	▼1.3	4	▼1
Centre	9,335	2.7	▲0.2	2	±0.0
KD	5,907	1.7	±0.0	1	±0.0
Movement Now	3,330	1.0	▼2.3	1	▼2
Liberal Party – Freedom to Choose	2,341	0.7	N/A	0	±0.0
Freedom Alliance	1,154	0.3	N/A	0	±0.0
Residents' Voice	1,076	0.3	▼0.2	0	±0.0
Open Party	637	0.2	N/A	0	±0.0
Environmental Joint List	304	0.1	N/A	0	±0.0
Voters' Association	287	0.1	N/A	0	±0.0
Total valid number of votes	341,611	100.00	±0.0	85	±0.0
Votes cast / turnout	342,665	61.1	▼0.6		

==== Tampere ====
In the second largest city of Tampere, the SDP retained the top spot and increased its lead over second place National Coalition after a near-tie in the last election. The Finns Party lost almost half of their votes. As a function of their collapse all other major parties were able to increase their vote share.

← Summary of the 13 April 2025 municipal election results in Tampere
Party	Vote			Seats	
Party	Votes	%	±pp	Won	+/−
SDP	35,006	29.0	▲4.6	20	▲3
National Coalition	30,196	25.0	▲0.8	17	±0.0
Green	20,928	17.3	▲1.8	12	▲1
Left Alliance	14,282	11.8	▲1.6	8	▲1
Finns	8,460	7.0	▼6.6	4	▼6
Centre	5,729	4.7	▲0.6	3	±0.0
KD	4,326	3.6	▼0.3	2	±0.0
Liberal Party – Freedom to Choose	433	0.4	▲0.1	0	±0.0
RKP	402	0.3	▲0.2	1	▲1
Movement Now	261	0.2	▼1.0	0	±0.0
Communist Party	242	0.2	▼0.1	0	±0.0
Animal Justice Party	161	0.1	▼0.2	0	±0.0
Freedom Alliance	159	0.1	N/A	0	±0.0
Crystal Party	100	0.1	▼0.5	0	±0.0
Voters' Association	75	0.1	N/A	0	±0.0
Communist Workers' Party Joint List	51	0.0	±0.0	0	±0.0
Total valid votes	120,851	100.00	±0.0	67	±0.0
Votes cast / turnout	123,029	56.7	▼0.1		
