= 2019 European Parliament election in Finland =

- 26 May 2019

All 14 Finnish seats in the European Parliament
- Turnout: 40.76%
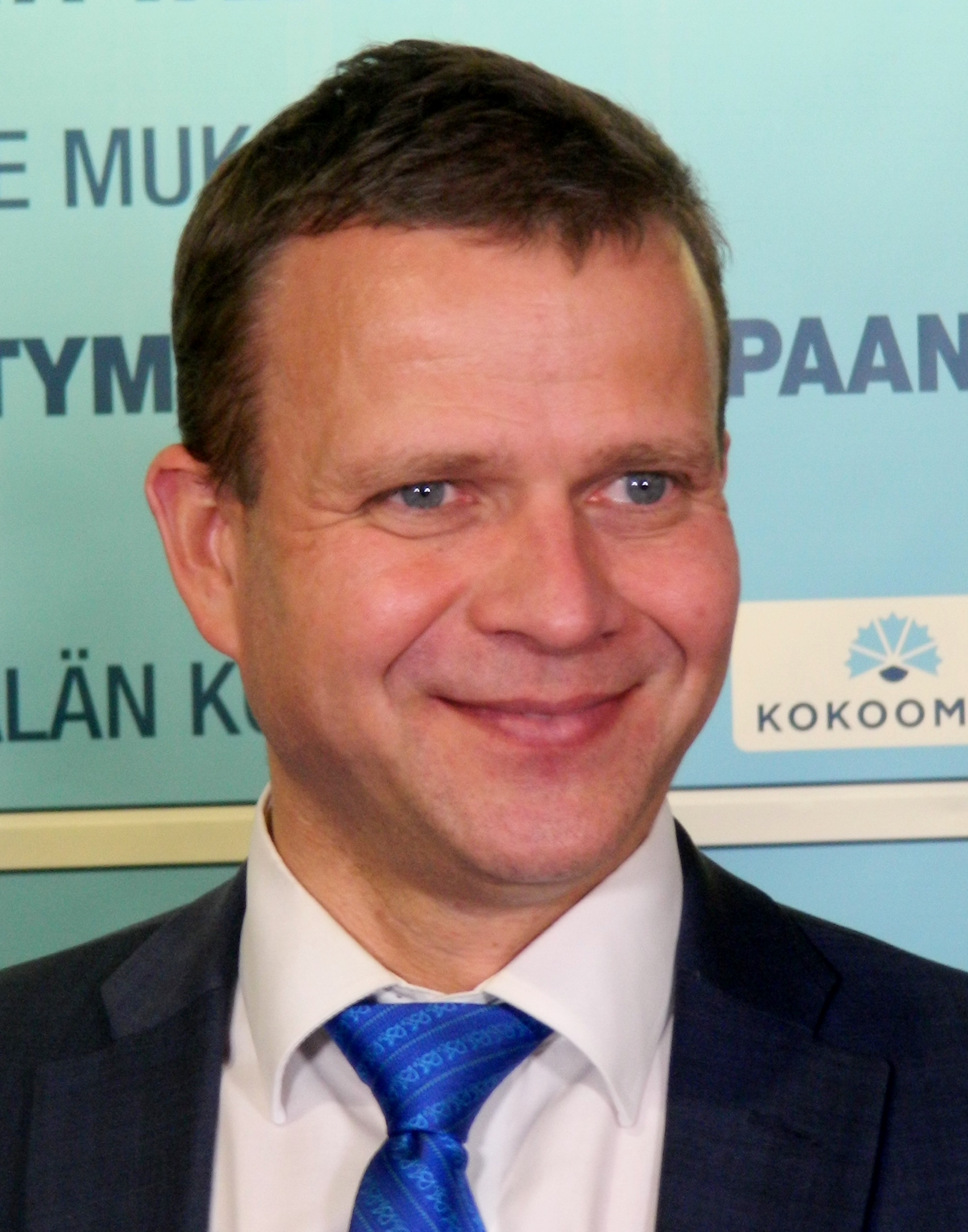

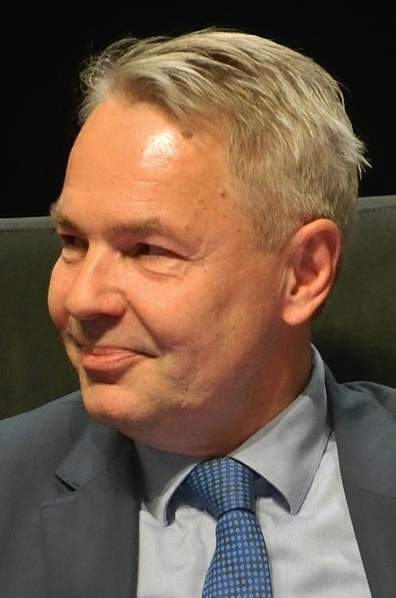

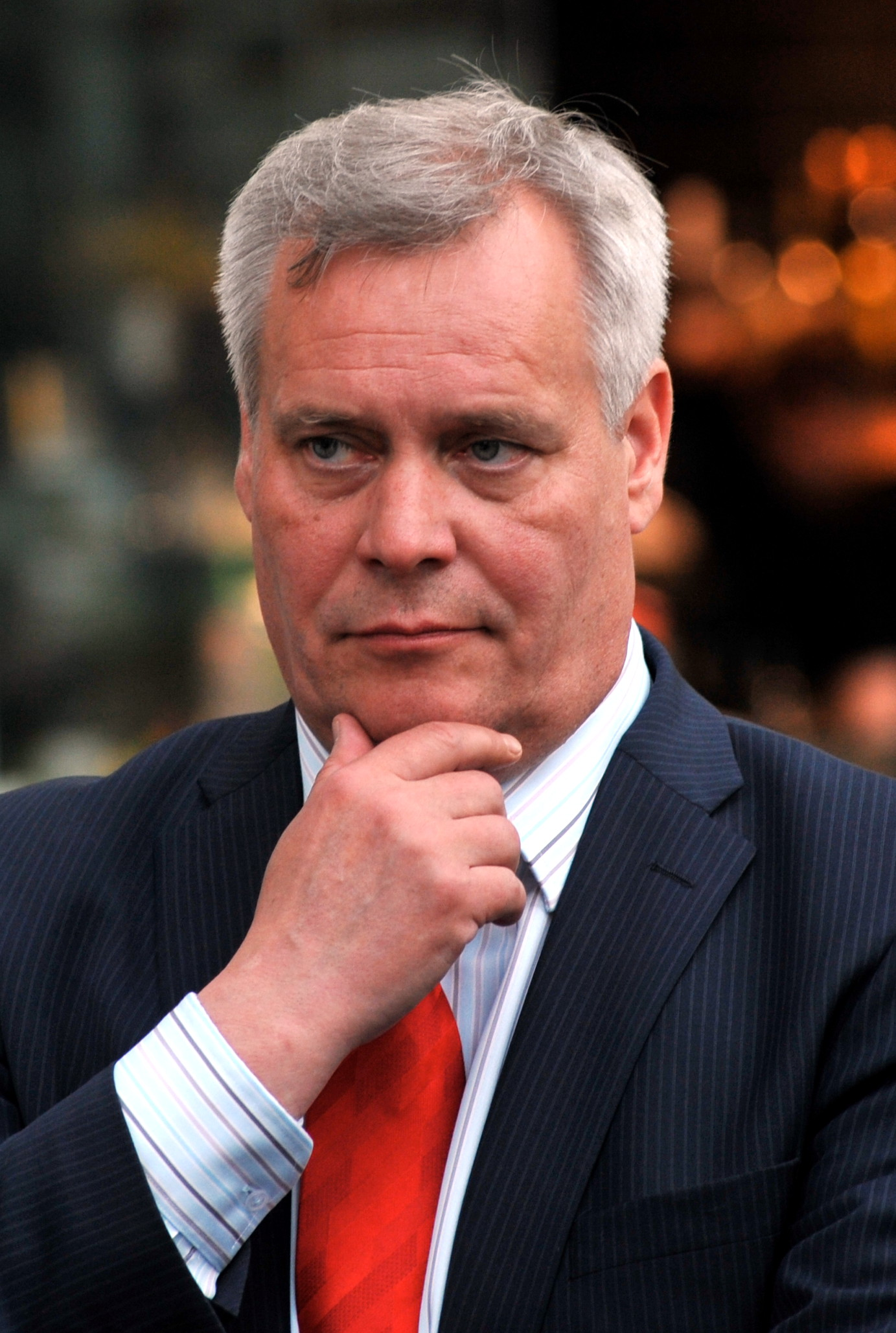

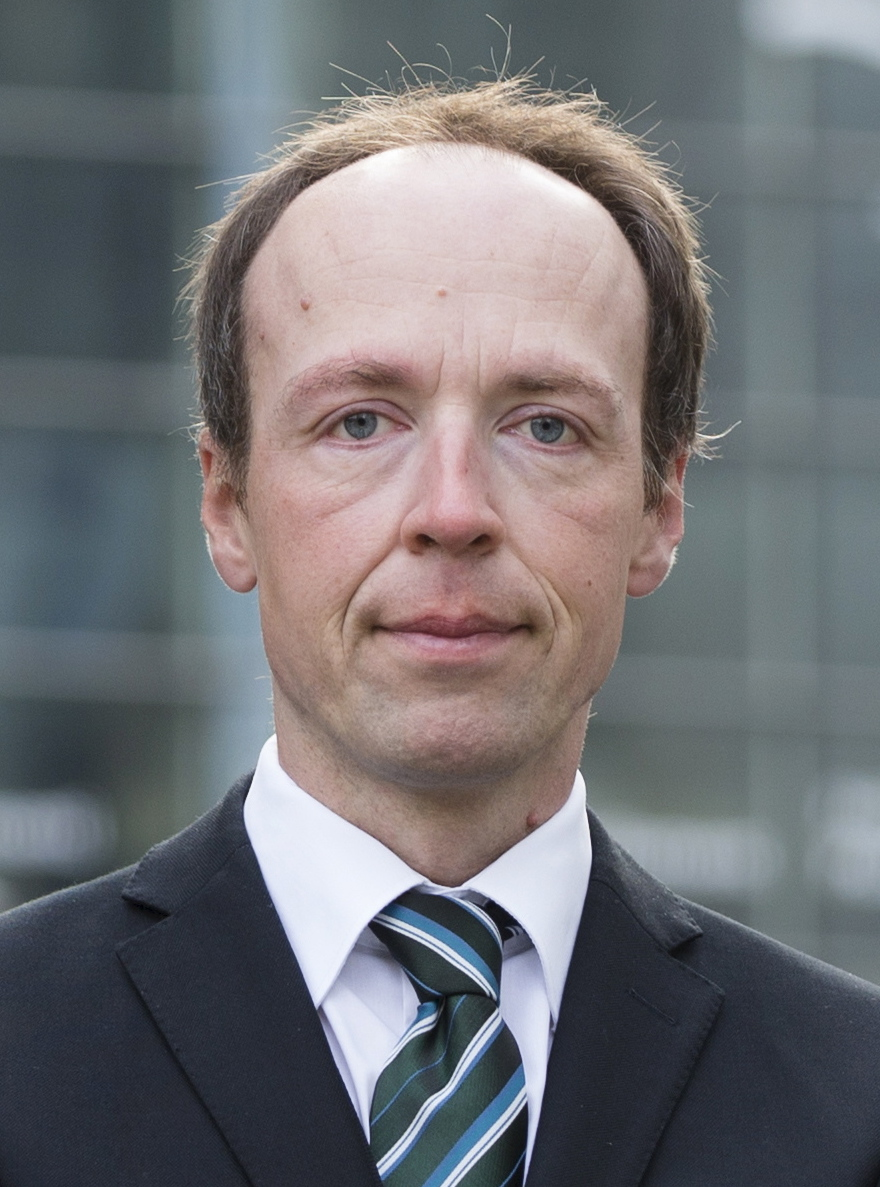

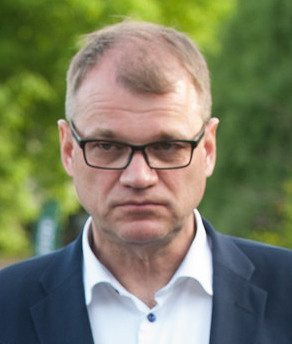

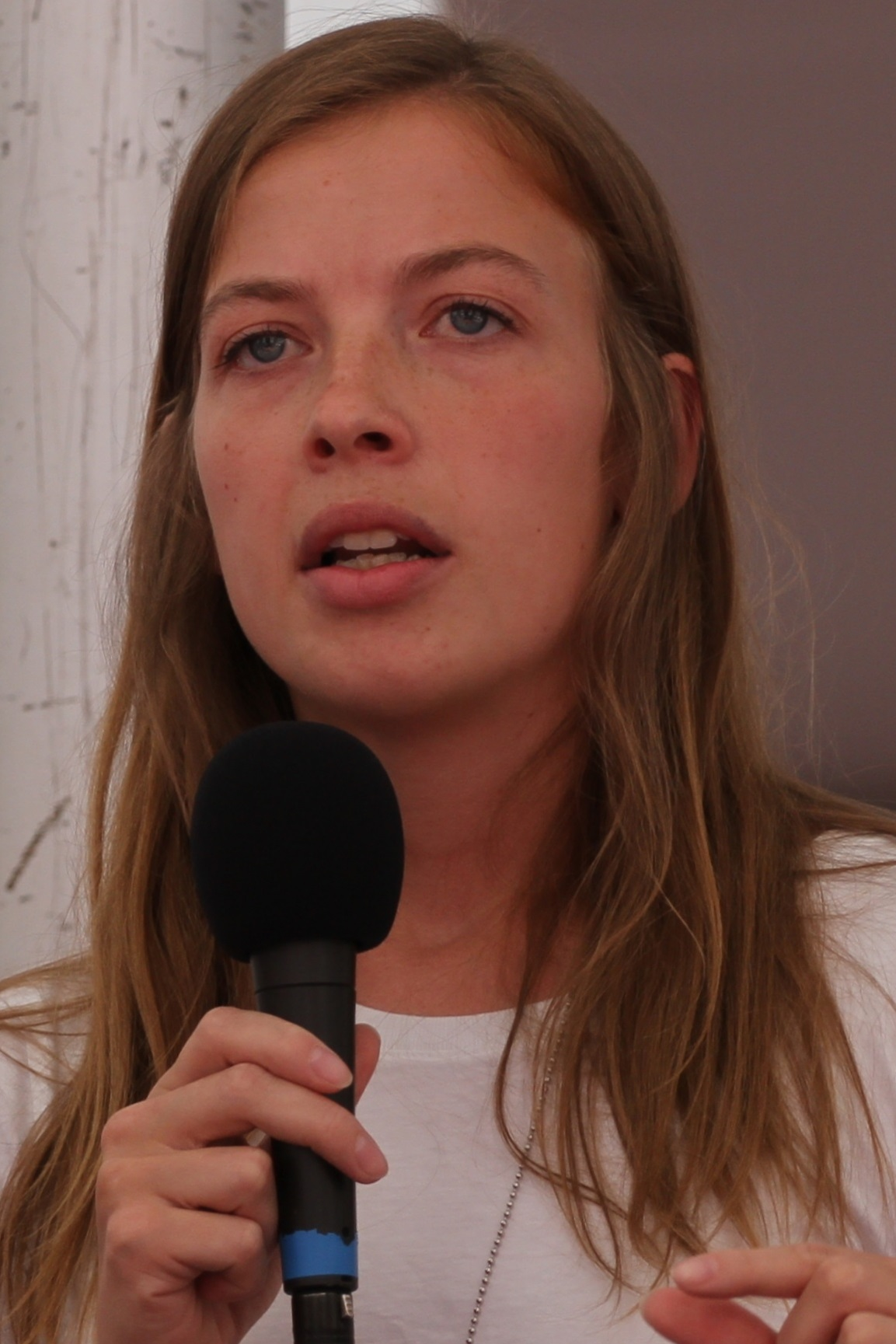

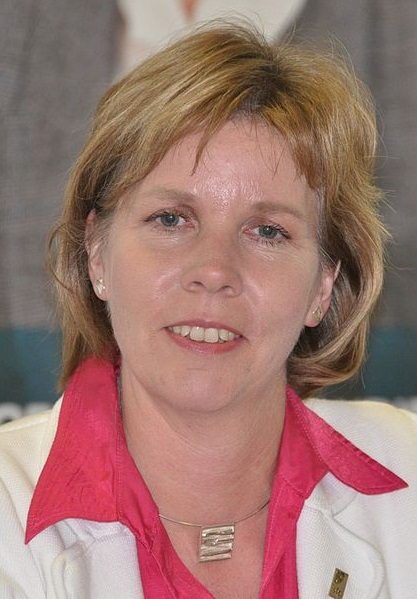
	First party	Second party	Third party
Leader	Petteri Orpo	Pekka Haavisto	Antti Rinne
Party	National Coalition	Green	SDP
Alliance	EPP	European Greens	PES
Last election	22.59%, 3 seats	9.33%, 1 seat	12.31%, 2 seats
Seats won	3	3	2
Seat change	Steady	▲2	Steady
Popular vote	380,106	292,512	267,342
Percentage	20.79%	16.00%	14.62%
Swing	▼1.80pp	▲6.67pp	▲2.31pp
	Fourth party	Fifth party	Sixth party
Leader	Jussi Halla-aho	Juha Sipilä	Li Andersson
Party	Finns	Centre	Left Alliance
Alliance	EAPN	ALDE	GUE/NGL
Last election	12.87%, 2 seats	19.67%, 3 seats	9.32%, 1 seat
Seats won	2	2	1
Seat change	Steady	▼1	Steady
Popular vote	252,990	247,416	125,749
Percentage	13.83%	13.52%	6.89%
Swing	▲0.96pp	▼6.15pp	▼2.43pp
	Seventh party
Leader	Anna-Maja Henriksson
Party	RKP
Alliance	ALDE
Last election	6.76%, 1 seat
Seats won	1
Seat change	Steady
Popular vote	116,033
Percentage	6.34%
Swing	▼0.42pp

An election of the delegation from Finland to the European Parliament took place on 26 May 2019.

A working committee consisting of the party secretaries of all parliamentary parties suggested in May 2017 that the 2019 Finnish parliamentary election, scheduled for April, should be organized simultaneously with the European Parliament election. The suggestion was considered by the Minister of Justice Antti Häkkänen, but did not have enough parliamentary support to pass. Ultimately, the Finnish parliamentary election took place on 14 April 2019.

== Opinion polls ==
Polling firm	Fieldwork date	Sample size	KOK	KESK	PS	SDP	VIHR	VAS	SFP	KD	Others	Lead
2019 election	26 May 2019	–	20.8	13.5	13.8	14.6	16.0	6.9	6.3	4.9	3.1	4.8
Taloustutkimus	23 Apr–21 May 2019	2,456	19.7	13.0	17.0	14.3	17.2	7.9	5.2	4.2	1.5	2.5
Kantar TNS	6–18 May 2019	2,005	20.1	13.5	16.3	15.5	13.0	8.3	6.8	5.0	1.5	3.8
2014 election	25 May 2014	–	22.6	19.7	12.9	12.3	9.3	9.3	6.8	5.2	1.9	2.9

== Results ==
Party	Votes	%	Seats	+/–
National Coalition Party	380,460	20.79	3	0
Green League	292,892	16.00	3	+2
Social Democratic Party	267,603	14.62	2	0
Finns Party	253,176	13.83	2	0
Centre Party	247,477	13.52	2	–1
Left Alliance	126,063	6.89	1	0
Swedish People's Party	115,962	6.34	1	0
Christian Democrats	89,204	4.87	0	0
Seven Star Movement	16,065	0.88	0	New
Pirate Party	12,579	0.69	0	0
Blue Reform	6,043	0.33	0	New
Feminist Party	4,442	0.24	0	New
Communist Party of Finland	3,532	0.19	0	0
Liberal Party – Freedom to Choose	3,015	0.16	0	New
Animal Justice Party	2,917	0.16	0	New
Finnish People First	2,495	0.14	0	New
Citizens' Party	2,043	0.11	0	New
Independents	4,077	0.22	0	0
Total	1,830,045	100.00	14	0
Valid votes	1,830,045	99.67		
Invalid/blank votes	6,014	0.33		
Total votes	1,836,059	100.00		
Registered voters/turnout	4,504,480	40.76		
Source: Ministry of Justice
