= Outi Alanko-Kahiluoto =

Finnish politician

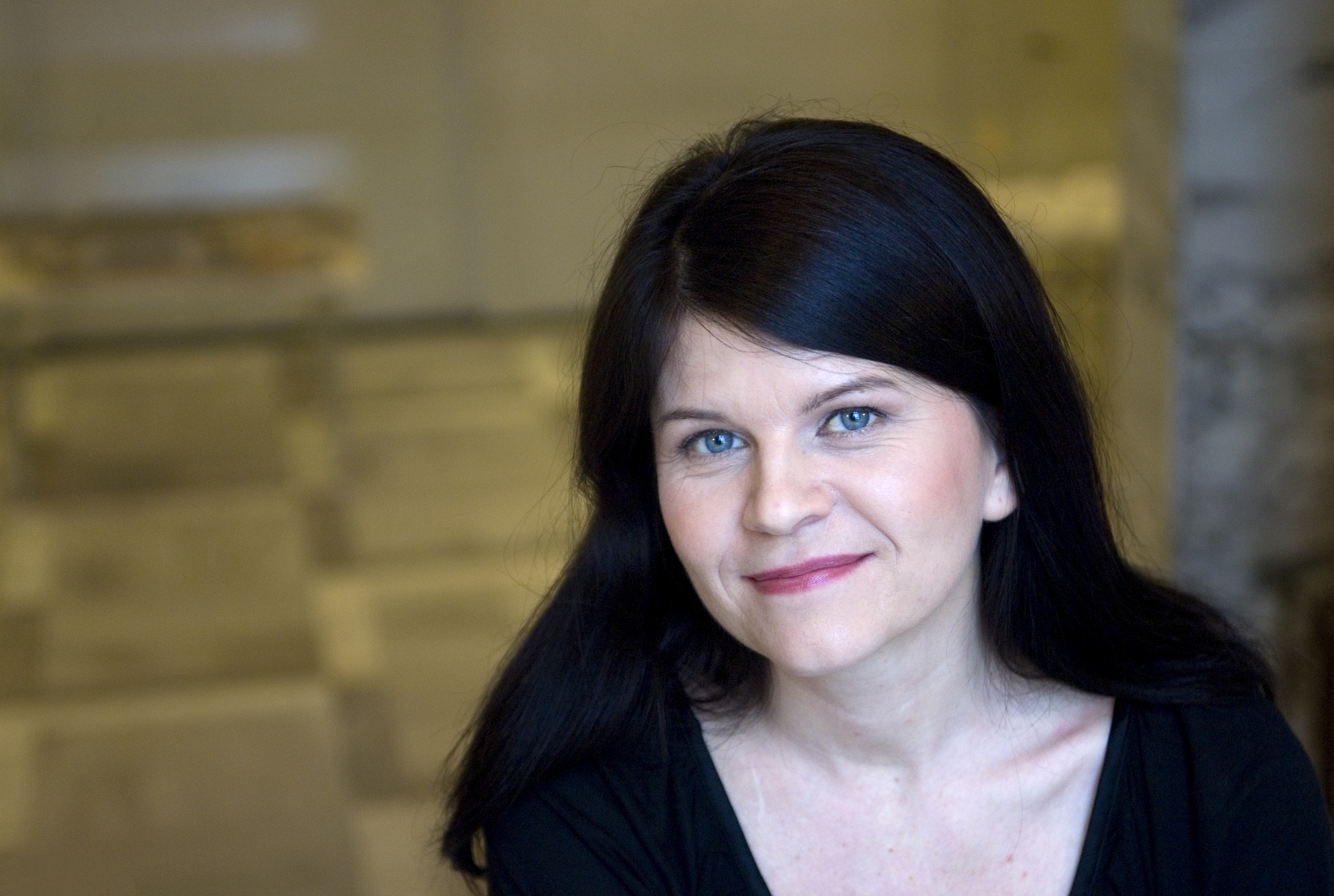
Outi Alanko-Kahiluoto in 2008

Outi Alanko-Kahiluoto (born 14 June 1966) is a Finnish politician representing the Green League. She was elected to the Finnish Parliament in the parliamentary election of March 2007 and reelected in 2011. In the 2015 parliamentary elections, Alanko-Kahiluoto was again reelected to the parliament with 7,884 votes. She was not re-elected in the 2023 Finnish parliamentary election.

She is also a member of the Helsinki City Council and has been the chairperson of the local party organisation in Helsinki. Her political career began with her successful campaign in the municipal elections in 2004.

Alanko-Kahiluoto was born in Oulu. Prior to her election to the parliament in 2007, she worked as a researcher at the University of Helsinki.

She is married to theatre director Atro Kahiluoto. They have two children.
