= Power Belongs to the People =

Power Belongs to the People Valta kuuluu kansalle
- Abbreviation: VKK
- Chairperson: Antti Asikainen
- Secretary: Mika Schwach
- First deputy chair: Dawson Clay
- Second deputy chair: Lauri Louhivirta
- Third deputy chair: Jarmo Ylinen
- Founder: Ano Turtiainen
- Founded: 10 June 2020 (AT); 5 June 2021 (VKK)
- Split from: Finns Party
- Headquarters: Yhdystie 2, 51900 Juva
- Membership (2022): 4,000
- Ideology: Finnish ultranationalism Anti-immigration; Christian nationalism Russophilia; Vaccine hesitancy
- Political position: Far-right
- Colours: Dark green Gold
- Slogan: "Valta kuuluu kansalle"
- Eduskunta: 0 / 200
- Municipalities: 0 / 8,586
- County seats: 0 / 1,379

Website
- valtakuuluukansalle.fi

Power Belongs to the People (Finnish: Valta kuuluu kansalle, VKK), formerly known as Parliamentary Group Ano Turtiainen (AT), is a political party in Finland. Ano Turtiainen was its group leader and was its only member of parliament. The group's rules state that the purpose of the group's activities is "to act in parliament in the interests of Finland and Finns and to have freedom of speech in elections".

The party has been known for its strong support for the Russian Federation, however after the change of leadership, the party has disassociated itself from Ano Turtiainen's connections to Russia.

== History ==
=== Parliamentary group ===
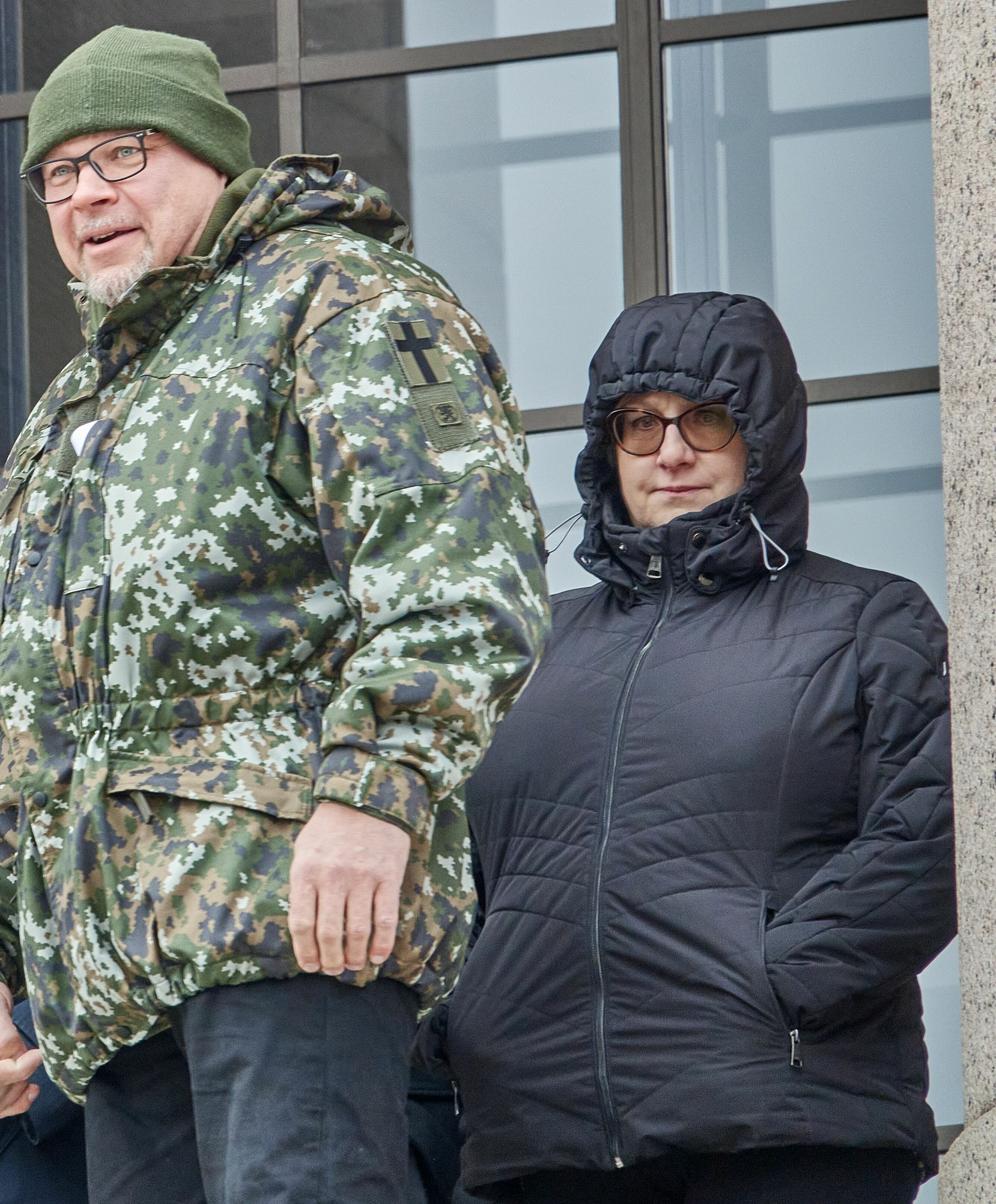
The founder of VKK is Ano Turtiainen (left). On the right is the former third deputy leader of the party and wife of Ano Turtiainen, Minna Turtiainen.

The parliamentary group in the Parliament of Finland was founded in June 2020 by Ano Turtiainen when he was sacked from the Finns Party parliamentary group, because of a racist tweet mocking George Floyd, and a history of inciting attacks against refugee centers. During 2021, the parliamentary group was renamed Power Belongs to the People and he planned to establish a political party.

=== Political party ===
Turtiainen was subsequently expelled from the Finns Party altogether, leading to his founding of Power Belongs to the People. The group gathered 5,000 signatures in a single day to form a new party. Three Finns in Espoo and city councillor from Lohja defected to VKK from the Finns party, and were joined by a city councillor from Veteli and previous deputy leader Jarno Vähäkainu who left the Finns after posting about executing Somali-Finnish politicians.

=== 2023 elections ===
The VKK party failed in the 2023 elections due to internal conflicts. The party had around 1,3% support in 2022, however due to many conflicts the party experienced splits. After the elections, Ano Turtiainen was invited to work in Russia as a representative of Finland, which he agreed to.

=== Replacement of Ano Turtiainen ===
At a party convention held on 23 March 2024, the party elected new leadership and Turtiainen was replaced by Antti Asikainen. The new leadership has disassociated themselves from Turtiainen's "unlawful actions behind the party's name" and his connections to Russia.

== Politics ==
Turtiainen has described the party as being centre-right and in support of direct democracy. He has also emphasized the importance of Christianity for Western society and its values. Kansan Uutiset describe the party as unequivocally far-right and ethnonationalist, while Keskipohjanmaa called the party's presentation as "radical" and similar to far-right and hard line right-wing populists.

According to Helsingin Sanomat, the party is in favor of Russia which is "completely exceptional in Finland outside of 1970s communists". Several leaders, including Turtiainen and James Hirvisaari have made Russophilic and pro-Putin statements. Further, the party's parliamentary candidate Johan Bäckman and editor-in-chief of pro-VKK organ MV-media Janus Putkonen have recruited combatants for the Russian side in Ukraine, who have then gone to the Russian Imperial Movement's training camps in St. Petersburg and become fighters in the Russo-Ukrainian war.

The party is also strongly anti-immigration. This is especially apparent in Jyväskylä, where both the party chairman and deputy chairman are members of the neo-Nazi linked Nationalist Alliance (Kansallismielisten Liittouma) and at least one of them is a member of the neo-Nazi Soldiers of Odin. The party program speaks of the white supremacist Great Replacement conspiracy theory and opposes the so called: "...program to replace the [native] population".

Belief in conspiracy theories is also common in the party, and some of the leaders engage in anti-semitic conspiracy theories. Some members also believe in Qanon. The Finnish National Bureau of Investigation suspects three people of treason, one of whom is associated with VKK. They were described as "well-known conspiracy theorists".

The party opposed sanctions on Russia and has demanded that they should be stopped.

== Election results ==
=== Parliament of Finland ===
Election	Votes	%	Seats	+/–	Government
2023	8,469	0.27	0 / 200	New	Extra-parliamentary

=== Municipal elections ===
Election	Councillors	Votes	%
2025	0	369	0.0

=== County elections ===
Election	Councillors	Votes	%
2022	10	24,189	1.3
