= Liberal Party – Freedom to Choose =

The Liberal Party – Freedom to Choose Liberaalipuolue – Vapaus valita (Finnish) Liberalpartiet – Frihet att välja (Swedish)
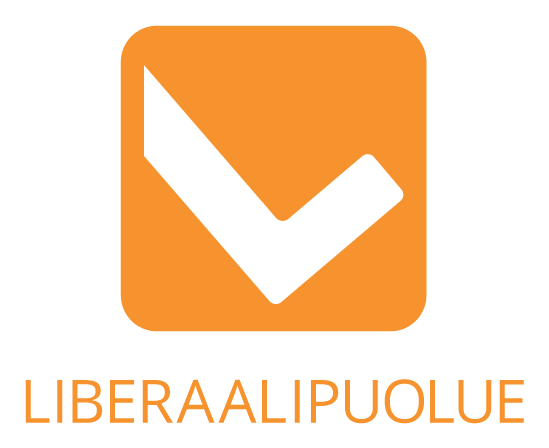
- Abbreviation: Lib
- Chairperson: Lassi Kivinen
- Vice-chairman: Tommi Vihervaara
- Secretary: Aarne Leinonen
- Founded: 2015; 11 years ago
- Headquarters: Tapionkatu 19 A 17, 33500 Tampere
- Youth wing: Liberaalinuoret
- Women's wing: Liberaalinaiset
- Ideology: Classical liberalism Market liberalism
- Colors: Orange
- Slogan: Vapaus valita (Freedom to Choose)
- Eduskunta: 0 / 200
- European Parliament: 0 / 15
- Municipalities: 1 / 8,586
- County seats: 0 / 1,379

Website
- liberaalipuolue.fi

The Liberal Party – Freedom to Choose (Finnish: Liberaalipuolue – Vapaus valita, Swedish: Liberalpartiet – Frihet att välja), formerly known as the Whisky Party (Finnish: Kansallinen Viskipuolue, Swedish: Whiskypartiet), is a classical-liberal Finnish political party, founded in 2015 and admitted to the register of political parties in 2016. Lassi Kivinen was elected chairman in 2022. The party was de-registered in 2023 after failing to win seats in two consecutive parliamentary elections. It was re-registered in January 2024.

== Platform ==
The party has a liberal view on alcohol policies, but claims a liberal platform overall. Its platform is to promote individual freedom, entrepreneurship, and decision-making based on scientific research. It opposes the political power of interest groups. It aims to decrease prohibitive restrictions, such as limitations on opening hours of restaurants and strict licensing of taxis. Tax reductions are also a part of its agenda.

== History ==
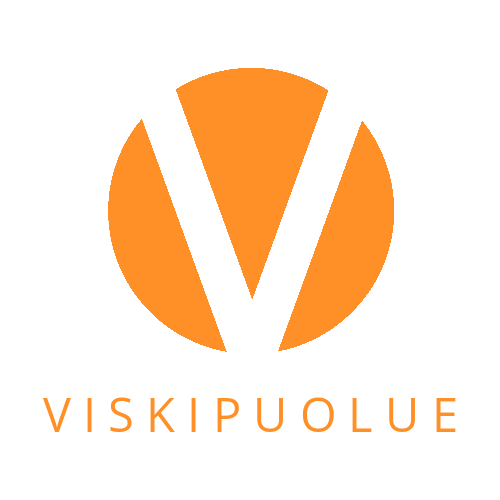
Logo of the Whisky Party

The impetus for founding the Liberal Party was a 2014 event dubbed "Whiskeygate" by the media. A beer and spirits convention was banned from using the name Olut & Viski Expo (Beer & Whiskey Expo) by the authorities, because the name was interpreted as being advertising of spirits, which is prohibited by the law. The party was to be founded in protest against what was perceived as overbearing regulation.

Whiskey Party was founded the next year, in 2015. Just before the 2015 parliamentary election, the not-yet-registered party promoted itself by handing out free servings of Whiskey. The party also published a campaigning song, "Vastuullisesti" ("Responsibly").

After the election, the party continued the practice of publicly serving free whiskey to attract signatures for support cards in the cities of Helsinki, Tampere, and Oulu.

By early February 2016, the party had secured the 5,000 signed support cards needed for registration. On 11 February, it submitted its application to the Ministry of Justice, which maintains the political party register of Finland. The party was officially registered on 18 March 2016.

Soon after, the party had gained enough signatures for registration, it was announced that there will be an election about the official name of the party. On 14 May 2016, the party adopted a new name: Liberaalipuolue ("Liberal Party"). The Finnish patent and registration office, however, did not accept the change due to the existence of similarly named associations, such as: Suomen Liberaalinen Puolue ry (Liberal Party of Finland, registered association) and Liberaalit ry (Liberals, registered association).

On 17 June 2016, the party tried to adopt a new name again: The Liberal Party – Freedom to Choose. The name was accepted by the Finnish patent and registration office on 21 June, as the addition to the name was enough to separate it from other associations.

The Liberal Party participated in the municipal elections in 2017 in major cities and allowed as candidates anybody regardless of political experience. The party won 4,117 votes and elected five councilors. None of its candidates were elected in the municipal elections of 2021.

== Election results ==
=== Parliament of Finland ===
Election	Votes	%	Seats	+/-	Government
2019	5,014	0.16%	0 / 200	New	Extra-parliamentary
2023	14,993	0.48%	0 / 200	0	Extra-parliamentary

=== European Parliament ===
Election	Votes	%	Seats	+/–	EP Group
2019	3,015	0.16 (#14)	0 / 13	New	–
2024	7,139	0.39 (#11)	0 / 15	0	–

=== Municipal elections ===
Year	Elected	Votes	Share
2017	5	4,117	0.2%
2021	0	947	0.0%
2025	1	5,929	0.2%
