= Teivo Teivainen =

Finnish political scientist (born 1965)

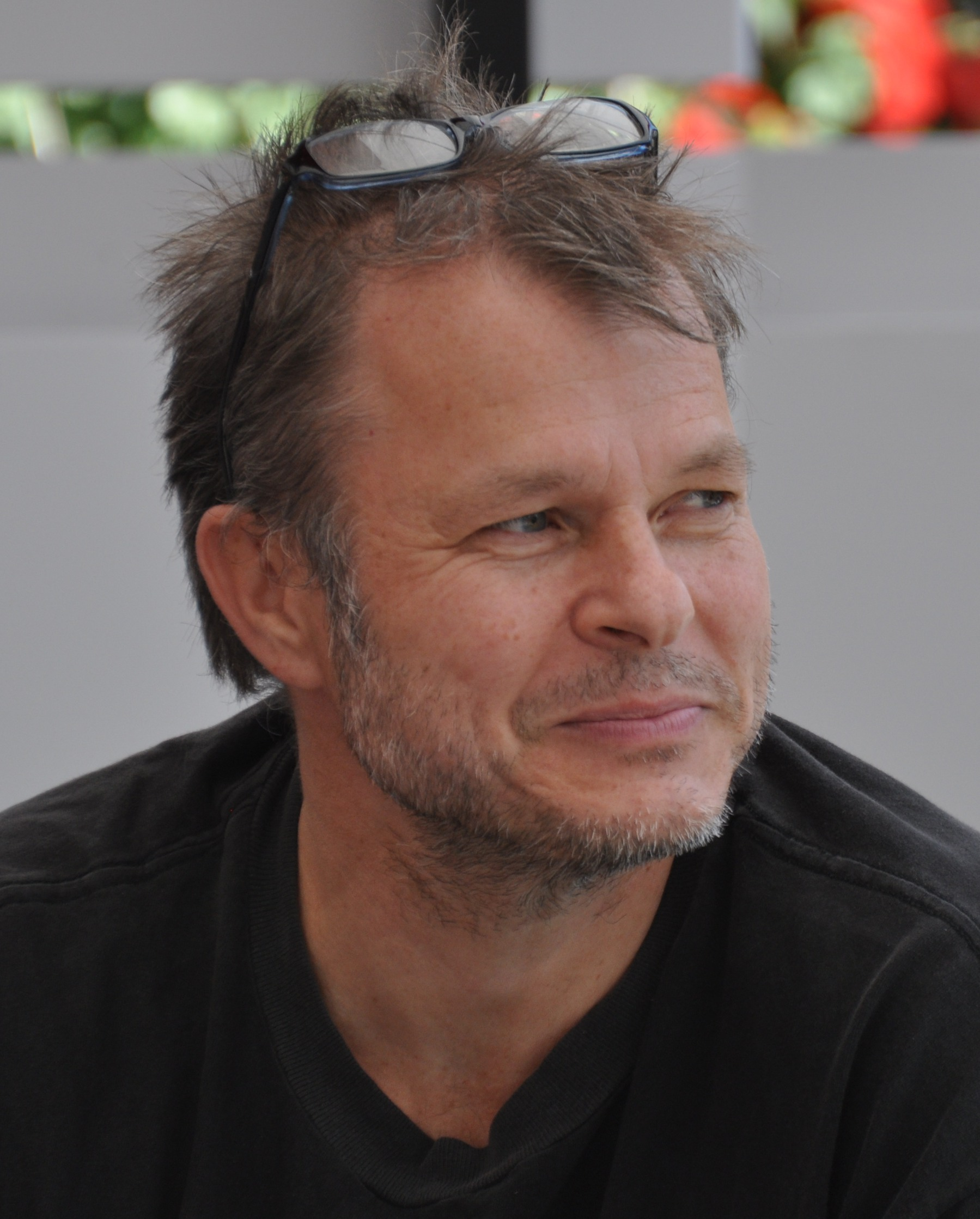
- Teivo Teivainen in 2013
- Born: 21 September 1965 (age 61); Helsinki, Finland
- Education: University of Helsinki
- Occupation: Professor
- Notable work: Enter Economism, Exit Politics: Experts, Economic Policy and the Damage to Democracy; A Possible World: Democratic Transformation of Global Institutions
- Website: blogs.helsinki.fi/teivaine/

Teivo Teivainen (born 21 September 1965) is professor of World Politics at the University of Helsinki, previously also Head of Political Science Department and Research Director of the Center of Excellence on Global Governance. In 2023, he was appointed by the government of Finland as Chair of the National Commission for UNESCO.

Having received his PhD in 2000 at the University of Helsinki, Teivainen became the founding director of the Program on Democracy and Global Transformation at the National University of San Marcos, in Lima, Peru in 2003. In 2006, Teivainen was nominated as a full professor of the University of Helsinki. In his inaugural presentation on 30 May 2007, Teivainen demanded for open and analytical debate on the relationship between capitalism and democracy. He emphasized the problematic nature of capitalism analysis in Finland, which he saw partly as a result of the geopolitical position of Finland. In addition, he characterized the discipline of World Politics as a field that should take seriously the political nature of non-state actors such as transnational corporations and social movements.

Teivainen has received many international awards and is a member of editorial board in several scientific journals, including Critical Sociology, International Sociology Reviews, Pensares y Quehaceres, International Dialogue: A Multidisciplinary Journal of World Affairs and Globalizations.

== Career ==
Teivainen's career has been both international and transdisciplinary. In Saint Mary's University in Canada, Teivainen has held the position of Distinguished Visiting Professor in development studies.

In Peru he has served as a visiting professor at the department of economics in the Catholic University and at the department of sociology in the National University of San Marcos. His first significant academic position was as a visiting scholar at the sociology department of the State University of New York at Binghamton in 1988. Later he served as a visiting researcher at the Fernand Braudel Center of the same university. Teivainen has visited universities in dozens of countries for research and academic presentations.

Teivainen has served in the Governing Council of the International Studies Association, which is the most important association for International Relations and as the chairperson of International Political Economy Section of the ISA. He has held different positions in other international scholarly organizations such as the Latin American Studies Association. At the University of California Riverside Teivainen forms part of the Advisory Board of the Institute for Research on World-Systems. He is also member of the Advisory Council of the Finnish Institute of International Affairs.

Teivainen has also worked as expert and consultant for various organizations. In 2006 he worked as the Deputy Chief of Mission of the European Union Election Observation Mission in Bolivia. Teivainen participated in the EU's election observation missions as legal expert in Ecuador in 2002 and Nicaragua in 2001. In addition, he served as a field observer during the two rounds of the Peruvian elections in 2001.

In South Africa, Teivainen was team leader of an evaluation project of the Democracy and Human Rights Fund of the Finnish Foreign Ministry in 1998. He has held several expert positions also in Nicaragua, Peru and Brazil. In addition, Teivainen has evaluated projects for the Trade Union Solidarity Centre of Finland in Colombia and the Dominican Republic. In the early 1990s Teivainen co-ordinated a project organized by the Student Union of the University of Helsinki in El Salvador.

== Awards ==
American Sociological Association rewarded Teivainen's doctoral research with Terence K. Hopkins Award as the best doctoral dissertation about the world-system in 2000.

In 2007, Teivainen was invited as a Presidential Panelist at the Association's annual meeting in New York.

In 2007 Teivainen was granted a recognition award by the Academy of Finland. The award is granted to a researcher who has in a significant manner made his/her research known and increased interest in science and participated as a researcher in public debate. Teivainen was the first social scientist in many years to receive the award.

In 2008, Teivainen was given the Pro Feminism award of the Finnish organization Left Women.

In 2011, the University of Helsinki gave him the J.V. Snellman Public Information Award.

In 2013, Teivainen received Ovet Award for the Best Initiative to Advance Understanding of Russia In Finland. This was due to his proposition of incorporating basic understanding of Cyrillic alphabet to the curriculum of Finnish schools.

In 2015, in co-operation with Matti Ylönen, Teivainen received Amartya Sen Prize from the Yale University for the article: "Politics of Intra-Firm Trade: Corporate Price Planning and the Double Role of the Arm’s Length Principle".

In 2017, he received Lauri Jäntti Foundation Honorary Award for the book 'Brasilia', co-authored with Maria Manner.

In 2022, Teivainen received the Outstanding Activist Scholar Award of the International Studies Association. It was awarded at the ISA Annual Convention in Nashville, where there was also a panel honoring and discussing Teivainen's contributions to the field.

== Research interests and societal activity ==
Teivainen's research focuses on global political economy, human rights, transnational social movements, global democracy and the contradictions of capitalism. At the moment he also works increasingly on history of Finland, preparing a book on the history of the hooked cross (or swastika) symbol. His earlier research on the symbol has received considerable global attention, with interviews in many parts of the world including BBC: Finland's air force quietly drops swastika symbol, Washington Post, Der Spiegel: Für viele ist das Hakenkreuz ein wichtiger Teil der finnischen Geschichte.

One of Teivainen's main publications is Enter Economism, Exit Politics, published in 2002. In the book, based on his dissertation, Teivainen analyses the transnational expansion of economism and its implications for democracy. Teivainen paid special attention to transformations in the boundaries between the political and the economic as well as between the inside and the outside. The book has a preface by Immanuel Wallerstein.

Articles dealing with similar topics include Towards a Democratic Theory of the World-System: Democracy, Territoriality and Transnationalization.

Teivainen's research interests also include the pedagogy of global power. In 2003 he published a book on the topic in Spanish. Teivainen has also published many articles on global democracy and cosmopolitanism together with professor Heikki Patomäki. In 2003, Patomäki and Teivainen published a book called A Possible World. Democratic Transformation of Global Institutions (Zed Books, London and New York). The book was originally published in English and later translated into Finnish, Arabic and Spanish.

Teivainen is also known as an active public commentator, frequently commenting topical societal issues in various domestic and international media. He has served in many civil society organizations dealing with alternative globalization, above all at the Network Institute for Global Democratization – NIGD. Teivainen has played an active role in the World Social Forum.In 2001 Teivainen, in representation of NIGD, was one of the founding members of the International Council of the World Social Forum and has since then participated in many activities of the Council.

== Selected books ==
- Teivo Teivainen: Democracy in Movement: The World Social Forum as a Political Process. Routledge, forthcoming.
- Teivo Teivainen: Hakaristin historia (History of the Swastika). Helsinki: SKS-kirjat, 2025, forthcoming.
- Teivo Teivainen: Maailmanpoliittinen kansalliskävely (World Political National Walk). Helsinki: Into. 2017. ISBN 978-952-264-838-9.
- Maria Manner and Teivo Teivainen: Brasilia (Brazil). Helsinki: Siltala. 2016. ISBN 978-952-234-356-7.
- Teivo Teivainen: Yritysvastuun umpikuja (Impasse of the Corporate Responsibility). Helsinki: Into. 2013. ISBN 978-952-5689-52-5.
- Heikki Patomäki and Teivo Teivainen: Ālam āḫir mumkin: al-taḥawwul al-dīmuqrāṭī lil-mu'assasāt al-ālamīya. Cairo: Al-Markaz al-Qaumī. 2008.
- Heikki Patomäki and Teivo Teivainen: Democracia global. Lima: Universidad Nacional Mayor de San Marcos. 2008. ISBN 978-612-46530-2-5.
- Heikki Patomäki and Teivo Teivainen: A Possible World: Democratic Transformation of Global Institutions. London: Zed Books. 2004. ISBN 978-1842774076.
- Teivo Teivainen: Pedagogía del poder mundial. Relaciones internacionales y lecciones del desarrollo en América Latina. Lima: Cedep. 2003. 5-TEI-PED.
- Heikki Patomäki and Teivo Teivainen: Globaali Demokratia (Global Democracy). London: Zed Books. 2003. ISBN 951-662-879-6.
- Teivo Teivainen: Enter Economism, Exit Politics: Experts, Economic Policy and Damage to Democracy. London: Zed Books. 2002. ISBN 1842770357.
- Teivo Teivainen: Un dólar, un voto. Economismo transnacional en el Perú. Lima: Desco. 2001. ISBN 978-9972-670-14-5.
- Teivo Teivainen: Fujimorin Peru: uusliberalismi, likainen sota ja kehitysyhteistyö (Peru of Fujimori: Neoliberalism, Dirty War and Development Cooperation). Helsinki: Like. 1999. ISBN 951-578-648-7.
- Teivo Teivainen: Valtioiden kurinalaistaminen globalisoituvassa maailmassa: Perun ja Kansainvälisen valuuttarahaston talouspoliittinen konflikti (The Disciplining of Nation-States in a Globalizing World: The Economic-Political Conflict Between Peru and The International Monetary Fund). Tampere: Finnish Peace Research Association. 1994.
- Teivo Teivainen (ed.): Näkökulmia Latinalaisen Amerikan tutkimukseen (Perspectives on Latin American Research). Helsinki: Ibero-American Center, University of Helsinki. 1992.
- Jussi Pakkasvirta ja Teivo Teivainen (ed.): Kenen Amerikka? 500 vuotta Latinalaisen Amerikan valloitusta (Whose America? 500 Years of the Conquest of Latin America). Jyväskylä: Gaudeamus. 1992. ISBN 9516625363.
