= The Open Party (Finland) =

Open Party Avoin Puolue (Finnish) Öppna Partiet (Swedish)
- Chairperson: Thierry Botty van den Bruele
- Registered: 1 March 2021
- Split from: Pirate Party
- Ideology: Market liberalism E-democracy; Direct democracy
- Political position: Syncretic

Website
- avoinpuolue.fi/en/

The Open Party (Finnish: Avoin Puolue, Swedish: Öppna Partiet) is a Finnish political party registered on 1 March 2021.

The party was founded in 2020 when its founder, Petrus Pennanen, resigned from the Finnish Pirate Party due to disagreements and founded a new city council group in Helsinki.

According to Pennanen, the Open Party operates outside the traditional left–right spectrum. Additionally, the party has claimed to be willing to work based on the best possible scientific knowledge and cooperate with all kinds of parties.

The party took part in the municipal election in 2021 but failed to gain any seats.

== Election results ==
=== Parliament of Finland ===
Election	Votes	%	Seats	+/–	Government
2023	985	0.03	0 / 200	New	Extra-parliamentary

=== European Parliament ===
Election	Votes	%	Seats	+/–	EP Group
2024	1,273	0.07 (#13)	0 / 15	–	
