= Ruut Sjöblom =

Finnish politician

Member of the Finnish Parliament for Uusimaa

Personal details
- Born: 24 August 1976 (age 49) Tuusula, Uusimaa, Finland
- Party: National Coalition Party

Ruut Sjöblom (born 23 August 1976) is a Finnish politician currently serving in the Parliament of Finland for the National Coalition Party at the Uusimaa constituency.
