= Pihla Keto-Huovinen =

Finnish politician (born 1974)

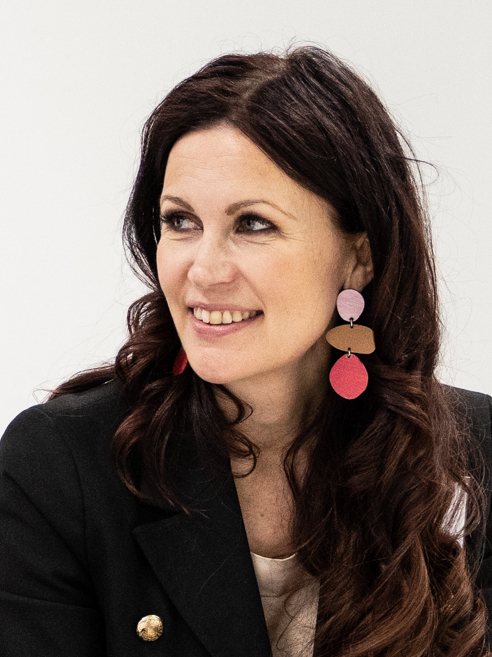
- Keto-Huovinen in May 2023.

Member of the Finnish Parliament for Uusimaa
- Incumbent
- Assumed office 17 April 2019

Personal details
- Born: 19 September 1974 (age 52) Espoo, Uusimaa, Finland
- Party: National Coalition Party
- Education: University of Helsinki

Pihla Keto-Huovinen (born 19 September 1974 in Espoo) is a Finnish politician currently serving in the Parliament of Finland for the National Coalition Party at the Uusimaa constituency.
