= Crystal Party =

Finnish political party

Crystal Party Kristallipuolue (Finnish) Kristall Parti (Swedish)
- Abbreviation: Kristall
- Chairperson: Sanna Seesvalo
- Secretary: Taina Alanen
- Vice chair: Juho Lahtinen
- Founded: 2014
- Registered: 2021
- Headquarters: Rinnekuja 6, 11100 Riihimäki
- Ideology: Spirituality; Vaccine hesitancy
- Political position: Syncretic
- Eduskunta: 0 / 200
- Municipalities: 0 / 8,859
- County seats: 0 / 1,379

Website
- www.kristallipuolue.fi

The Crystal Party (Finnish: Kristallipuolue, Swedish: Kristall Parti) is a Finnish party that was registered in 2021. The founding meeting of the association that would become the Crystal Party was held on 6 December 2013 by five people. The association was registered in April 2014. The association started gathering signatures in order to register as a political party and reached the required 5000 signatures in March 2021.

== Ideology ==
Upon registration, the party described itself to the Finnish register as follows:

"The Crystal Party wants to do politics with pure hearts and open minds. The party's vision is a higher consciousness, which considers people as unique and conscious individuals and as part of a universal whole. The Kristalli party promotes the realization of human free will and the right to self-determination. Everyone must be absolutely respected, simply based on the dignity of each person. Everyone is equal. Love is our weapon, truth is our sword, goodness is our shield".

The party rejects materialism and instead advocates that decisions should be "guided by the heart". The party claims to be neither left nor right-wing.

The party opposes vaccine mandates and espouses COVID-19 conspiracy theories. Its former chairperson, Juho Lyytikäinen, has called Bill Gates the "world's most influential doctor" and claims that the pandemic was orchestrated by the World Health Organization. The party also believes that Western medicine is not enough to answer all the questions regarding modern health problems. Instead, it supports alternative medicine like homeopathy and advocates for official recognition of such treatments.

== Local representation ==
In 2020, a city councillor in Polvijärvi was expelled from the Social Democratic Party after denying the Holocaust. She later founded a councillor group for the Crystal Party and thus became the party's first and so far only municipal councillor.

The Crystal Party took part in its first elections during the 2021 municipal elections. The party won 6,285 votes (0.3% of overall share) at the national level. None of its candidates were elected. One of the best-known candidates was Maria Nordin, a controversial wellness coach.

== Election results ==
=== Parliament of Finland ===
Election	Votes	%	Seats	+/–	Government
2023	4,894	0.16	0 / 200	New	Extra-parliamentary
