= Pirate Party (Finland) =

Pirate Party Piraattipuolue (Finnish) Piratpartiet (Swedish)
- Chairperson: Marek Nečada
- Deputy chair: Jarno Luoma-Nirva
- Founded: 24 May 2008
- Headquarters: Franzéninkatu 5 E 1; 00500 Helsinki
- Newspaper: Purje (discontinued 2013)
- Youth wing: Pirate Youth
- Membership (2019): 173
- Ideology: Pirate politics Freedom of information Information privacy
- Political position: Big tent
- International affiliation: Pirate Parties International
- European political alliance: European Pirate Party
- Colours: Purple; Black; White

Website
- www.piraattipuolue.fi

The Pirate Party (Finnish: Piraattipuolue, IPA: [ˈpirɑːtːiˌpuo̯lueˣ]) is a Finnish Pirate Party that was registered as a political party from 2009 to 2023. The group currently has around 173 paying members. The party is a member of Pirate Parties International and European Pirate Party.

== History ==
In January 2008, Matti Hiltunen registered the domain piraattipuolue.fi and set up a BBS on the site. In May 2008, about 50 founding members of the party held the founding assembly in Tampere. In September 2008 the party started to collect the 5,000 supporter cards needed to officially register the party. The party's goal was to take part in the 2009 European Parliamentary election. The supporter cards were collected by 1 June 2009, too late for the elections. The party was officially registered on 13 August 2009.

In October 2009, the Pirate Party took part in the special municipal election of Loviisa with 1 candidate, but did not win a seat. The party's first major election was the 2011 Finnish parliamentary election with 127 candidates in 11 constituencies, receiving 0.5% of votes and becoming the largest party to have no seats in parliament. In the 2014 European Parliament election it won 12,378 votes (0.7%). In the 2015 Finnish parliamentary election the party received 25,105 or 0.8% of total votes, and was left without seats in the parliament. Consequently, the Ministry of Justice de-registered the party for failing to win seats in two consecutive parliamentary elections. The party collected the required 5,000 supporter cards again and was re-registered on 6 June 2016. After failing to win seats in the next two parliamentary elections, it was de-registered again in 2023.

In the 2017 municipal elections, the Pirate Party gained two seats on municipal councils, one in Helsinki and one in Jyväskylä. Helsinki council member Petrus Pennanen received 1,364 votes; Jyväskylä council member Arto Lampila received 191 votes. Both lost their seats in the municipal elections of 2021.

== Political goals ==
In its political agenda, the party aims to develop open democracy, safeguard civil rights and increased transparency in politics. It wants to free information and culture from prohibitive restrictions and review the utility of the patent system, all while increasing privacy and freedom of speech. The party supports a universal basic income and wants to abolish daylight saving time.

== Pirate Youth ==
The party has a youth organisation, the Pirate Youth (Finnish: Piraattinuoret). It was founded on 5 February 2009 in Helsinki. It has an upper age-limit of 28 years. Membership of Piraattinuoret is free of charge.

== Election results ==
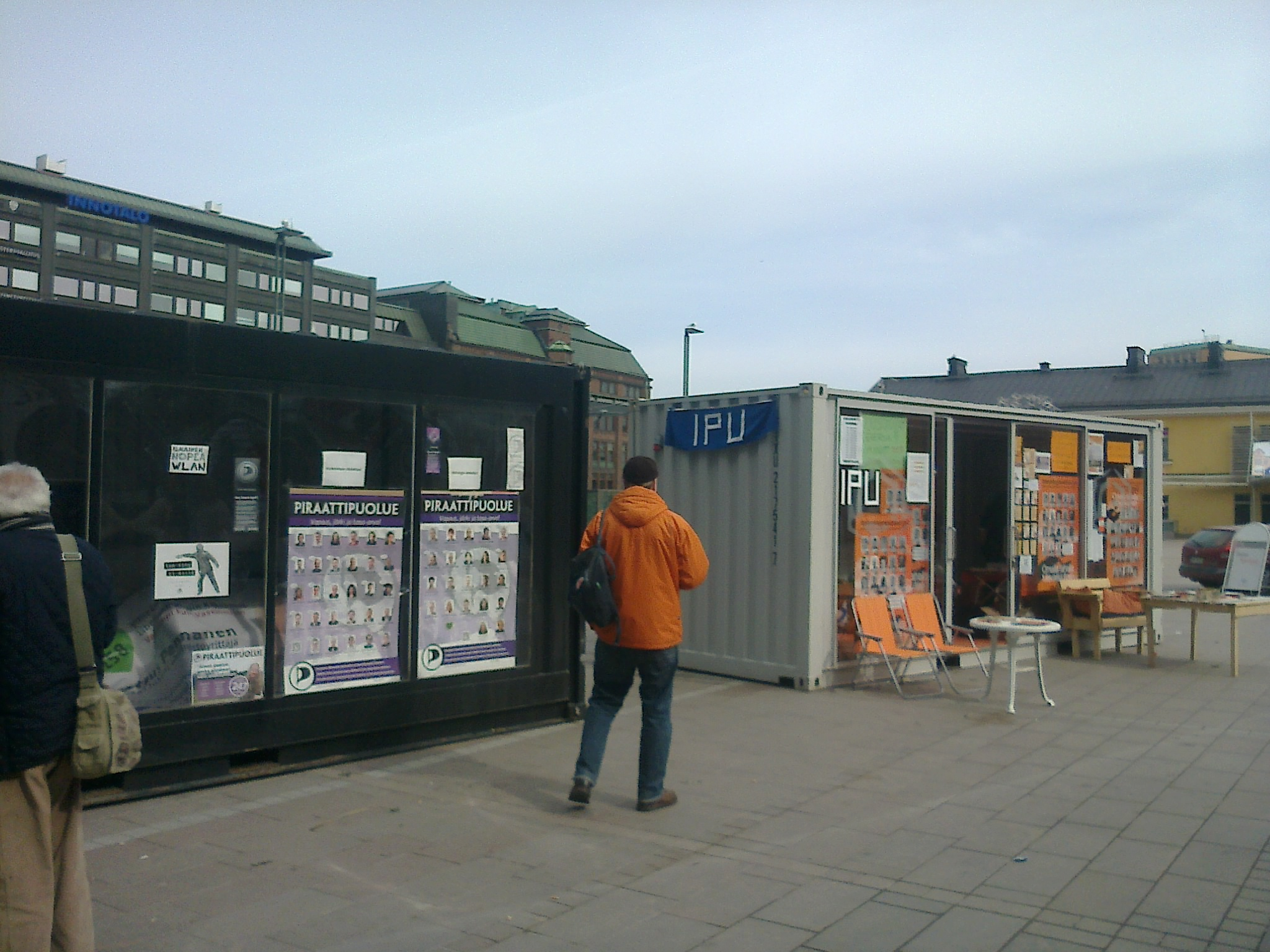
Election campaign stations for the Pirate Party and Independence Party on Narinkkatori in Helsinki

=== Parliament of Finland ===
Election	Votes	%	Seats	+/–	Government
2011	15,103	0.51	0 / 200	New	Extra-parliamentary
2015	25,105	0.85	0 / 200	0	Extra-parliamentary
2019	19,032	0.62	0 / 200	0	Extra-parliamentary
2023	3,058	0.10	0 / 200	0	Extra-parliamentary

=== European Parliamentary elections ===
Year	Elected	Votes	Share	Ref.
2014	0	12,355	0.7%	
2019	0	12,579	0.7%	

=== Municipal elections ===
Year	Elected	Votes	Share	Ref.
2012	0	5,986	0.2%	
2017	2	9,075	0.4%	
2021	0	2,608	0.1%	

== Party chairs ==
- Carl E. Wahlman (2008)
- Pasi Palmulehto (2008–2012)
- Harri Kivistö (2012–2014)
- Tapani Karvinen (2014–2016)
- Jonna Purojärvi (2016–2018)
- Petrus Pennanen (2018–2019)
- Pekka Mustonen (2019–2020)
- Riikka Nieminen (2020-)
