= Finnish People First =

Finnish People First Suomen Kansa Ensin
- Abbreviation: SKE
- Chairperson: Riikka Salmi
- Secretary: Ari Lindström
- Vice chairperson: Kari Sunell
- Founded: 2018
- Dissolved: 2023
- Split from: Suomi Ensin
- Headquarters: Tampere, Finland
- Ideology: Finnish nationalism Euroscepticism; Anti-immigration; Anti-Islamization
- Political position: Far-right
- Parliament of Finland: 0 / 200

Website
- skepuolue.fi

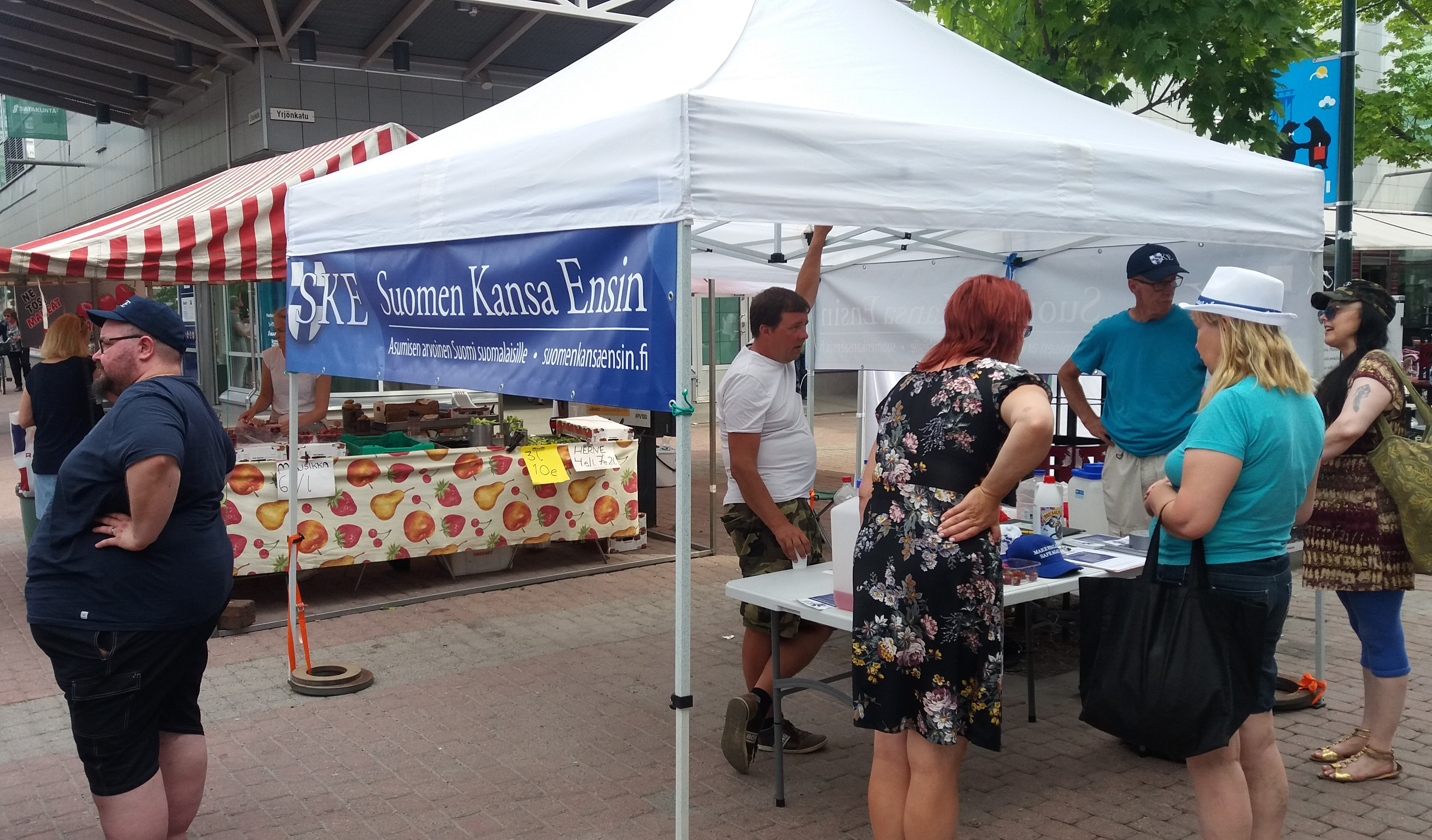
Finnish People First campaigning during SuomiAreena

Finnish People First (Finnish: Suomen Kansa Ensin, SKE) was a nationalist political party in Finland. It was founded in 2018 and de-registered in 2023 after failing to win seats in two consecutive parliamentary elections. In July 2023, the party filed for bankruptcy and announced its dissolution.

== History ==
Finnish People First originated from the Suomi Ensin ("Finland First") movement that organized a protest camp in central Helsinki in the spring of 2017. The movement was led by Marco de Wit, a YouTuber from Tampere. The movement splintered into numerous competing factions, one of which evolved into Finnish People First, also led by de Wit. It was registered as an association in November 2017. The association had collected the required 5,000 supporter cards by October 2018, and was admitted to the party register in December that year. Soon after, the party descended into internal strife. A party conference was convened to address the issue, but only resulted in furthering the divides. The conference re-elected Marco De Wit as the party chairman, but some members of the party contested the validity of the conference. Another conference in November 2019 also brought up divisions within the party, when a group of members voted a new chair at a meeting, and after the meeting was partly evicted from the premises by security, the disputed new chair decided the meeting would continue at a neighbouring room with a large part of participants while another disputed chair decided to continue the meeting at the original premises with rest of the participants.

Finnish People First took part in the 2019 parliamentary election. During the campaign the party displayed campaign ads that the police investigated for criminal content. No candidates were elected.

== Ideology ==
Finnish People First was extreme nationalist and anti-immigration. It opposed Finland's membership in the European Union and the Eurozone, and would return to its former currency, the Finnish markka. The party opposed NATO and what it called "harmful immigration" and "Islamization". The party has been described as far-right, although the way it described its position on the left–right political spectrum was ambiguous.

== Election results ==
=== Parliament of Finland ===
Election	Votes	%	Seats	+/–	Government
2019	2,366	0.08	0 / 200	New	Extra-parliamentary
2023	1,229	0.04	0 / 200	0	Extra-parliamentary

=== Municipal elections ===
Election	Votes	%	Seats
2021	197	0.0	0

== See also ==
- Politics of Finland
- List of political parties in Finland
- Elections in Finland
