= Wellbeing services counties =

Type of statutory corporation in Finland

The wellbeing services counties (Finnish: hyvinvointialue, Swedish: välfärdsområde, Northern Sami: buresveadjinguovlu, Inari Sami: pyereestvaijeemkuávlu, Skolt Sami: pueʹrrvââjjamvuʹvdd) are responsible for organising health, social and emergency services in Finland. There are 21 wellbeing services counties and the county division is mainly based on the region division. The public authorities are separate from the municipalities and from the central government.

The wellbeing services counties are self-governing. They do not have the right to levy taxes and their funding is based on central government funding. The central government allocates different amounts of funding to the different wellbeing services counties, depending on the structure of their population.

A wellbeing services county may also perform functions in its territory that support its statutory functions, such as international activities and the protection of the mutual interests of the counties. It may carry on a low-risk business in its territory or in conjunction with another county that supports the performance of its statutory functions. The counties may carry out their functions jointly under an agreement. The forms of cooperation are a joint institution, a joint office, an agreement on the performance of official duties and a welfare consortium. The business of a consortium can only be the provision of support services. Organisational responsibility cannot be delegated to a consortium.

== History ==
The wellbeing services counties are following the social reform initiated by the Marin Cabinet. On 23 June 2021, the Parliament of Finland approved the bills on social and health care reform. According to the law on the implementation of the reform, the tasks and organizational responsibility for social and health care services and rescue services were transferred from the municipalities to the counties on 1 January 2023. In order to implement regional cooperation and an appropriate service structure, five cooperation areas were formed from the counties, corresponding to the special areas of responsibility of the university hospitals.

The establishment of the wellbeing services counties was one of the most important administrative reforms in Finnish history. According to the government, the reform was necessary to ensure equality of service, reduce inequalities in health and well-being, and control cost growth.

== Responsibilities ==
The responsibilities of wellbeing services counties include:

- Primary care
- Specialised health care
- Social welfare
- Services for children, young people and families
- Employment services
- Mental health and substance misuse/abuse services
- Disability services
- Emergency services
- Crisis support services

The cooperation between the counties and municipalities is focused on promoting health and well-being, thereby reducing the need for health and social services. In addition, private healthcare operators and organisations and associations can complement public health and social services. The municipalities are responsible, for example, for day care for children, education, sport and culture.

On the 10th of July 2026 the Supreme Administrative Court ruled unanimously in a five justice division that a county must comply with budget deficit laws. Where this endangers constitutional rights the court ruled the counties must primarily use statutory mechanisms, that are subject to separate apellate review, for additional funding instead of passing illegal budgets. It did not, according to the court, follow from the constitution that the mechanisms may be bypassed as contrary to the constitution. (Note: Court rulings in Finland, not even that of the Supreme Administrative Court, do not form precedents binding on authorities and courts in future cases.)

== Administration ==
The highest decision-making body in the wellbeing county is the County council, which is responsible for the operation, administration and finances of the welfare area. The delegates and deputy commissioners of the county council are elected in the county elections for a four-year term. The number of delegates ranges from 59 to 89, depending on the population of the county.

- 59 councillors: Central Ostrobothnia, Kainuu, East Uusimaa, South Karelia, South Savo, Kymenlaakso, North Karelia, Kanta-Häme, Ostrobothnia, Lapland, South Ostrobothnia
- 69 councillors: Central Uusimaa, Päijät-Häme, Satakunta, North Savo, Central Finland and Vantaa-Kerava.
- 79 councillors: North Ostrobothnia, West Uusimaa, Southwest Finland, Pirkanmaa

== List of the wellbeing services counties ==
Map of the Finnish wellbeing services counties

There will be 21 wellbeing services counties in Finland:

1. Lapland wellbeing services county
2. North Ostrobothnia wellbeing services county
3. Kainuu wellbeing services county
4. Central Ostrobothnia wellbeing services county
5. Central Finland wellbeing services county
6. North Savo wellbeing services county
7. North Karelia wellbeing services county
8. South Savo wellbeing services county
9. South Ostrobothnia wellbeing services county
10. Pirkanmaa wellbeing services county
11. Kanta-Häme wellbeing services county
12. Ostrobothnia wellbeing services county
13. Satakunta wellbeing services county
14. Southwest Finland wellbeing services county
15. West Uusimaa wellbeing services county
16. Central Uusimaa wellbeing services county
17. East Uusimaa wellbeing services county
18. Päijät-Häme wellbeing services county
19. Kymenlaakso wellbeing services county
20. South Karelia wellbeing services county
21. Vantaa-Kerava wellbeing services county

In addition, the City of Helsinki (22.) and the autonomous Region of Åland (23.) will remain outside the wellbeing services counties, exercising similar competences on their own.

== See also ==
- Counties of Finland
- 2022 Finnish county elections
- 2025 Finnish county elections
