= Animal Justice Party of Finland =

Finnish political party

Animal Justice Party of Finland Eläinoikeuspuolue (Finnish) Djurrättspartiet (Swedish)
- Abbreviation: EOP
- Chairman: Tatu Chanth
- Founded: 2015
- Headquarters: Ylännekatu 14 E 40, Turku
- Ideology: Animal rights Animal welfare Veganism
- Political position: Left-wing
- European political alliance: Animal Politics EU
- Colors: Orange
- Slogan: Ääni elämälle (A voice for life)

Website
- www.eop.fi

Animal Justice Party of Finland (Finnish: Eläinoikeuspuolue, Swedish: Djurrättspartiet) is a political party in Finland founded in 2015 and admitted to the registry of political parties in 2016. The party's chairman is Tatu Chanth. The party participated in the municipal elections in 2017. In 2019, the party joined the Animal Politics EU movement. It was de-registered in 2023 after failing to win any seats in two consecutive parliamentary elections, and re-registered again in 2024.

== Ideology ==
According to the party's manifesto, its main goal is to make Finland "a society where humans and other animals are offered equal rights to a full life and a secure future", and to promote fair treatment of all animals. The party supports veganism, arguing that eating meat cannot be considered a private preference because it threatens the environment and ecosystems on Earth. The EOP states that "the meat norm and the habits associated with it must be dismantled". It argues that "moving to a vegan society is the lifeblood of our future", and sees veganism as not only a moral necessity, but also a way to abolish the 'culture of violence' produced by the exploitation and commodification of animals.

The party is a part of Animal Justice EU, and took part in the joint manifesto of the party, which includes redirecting EU subsidies from livestock industry to plant-based agriculture, banning hunting, overfishing, animal testing and long-distance transport of live animals, ending traditions that include animal cruelty such as bull fighting, non-stun slaughter and foie gras production, implementing a carbon tax, accelerating the switch to renewable energy, and promoting plant-based lifestyle. Along with other parties of the Animal Politics EU, the EOP has also adopted a left-wing ideology, which includes criticism of capitalism and globalization, and supporting the expansion of welfare state.

== Election results ==
=== Parliament of Finland ===
Election	Votes	%	Seats	+/–	Government
2019	3,378	0.11	0 / 200	New	Extra-parliamentary
2023	3,107	0.10	0 / 200	0	Extra-parliamentary

=== Municipal elections ===
Year	Elected	Votes	Share
2017	0 / 8,999	1,795	0.1%
2021	0 / 8,999	1,761	0.1%
2025	0 / 8,586	544	0.0%
