= Kristiina Salonen =

Finnish politician

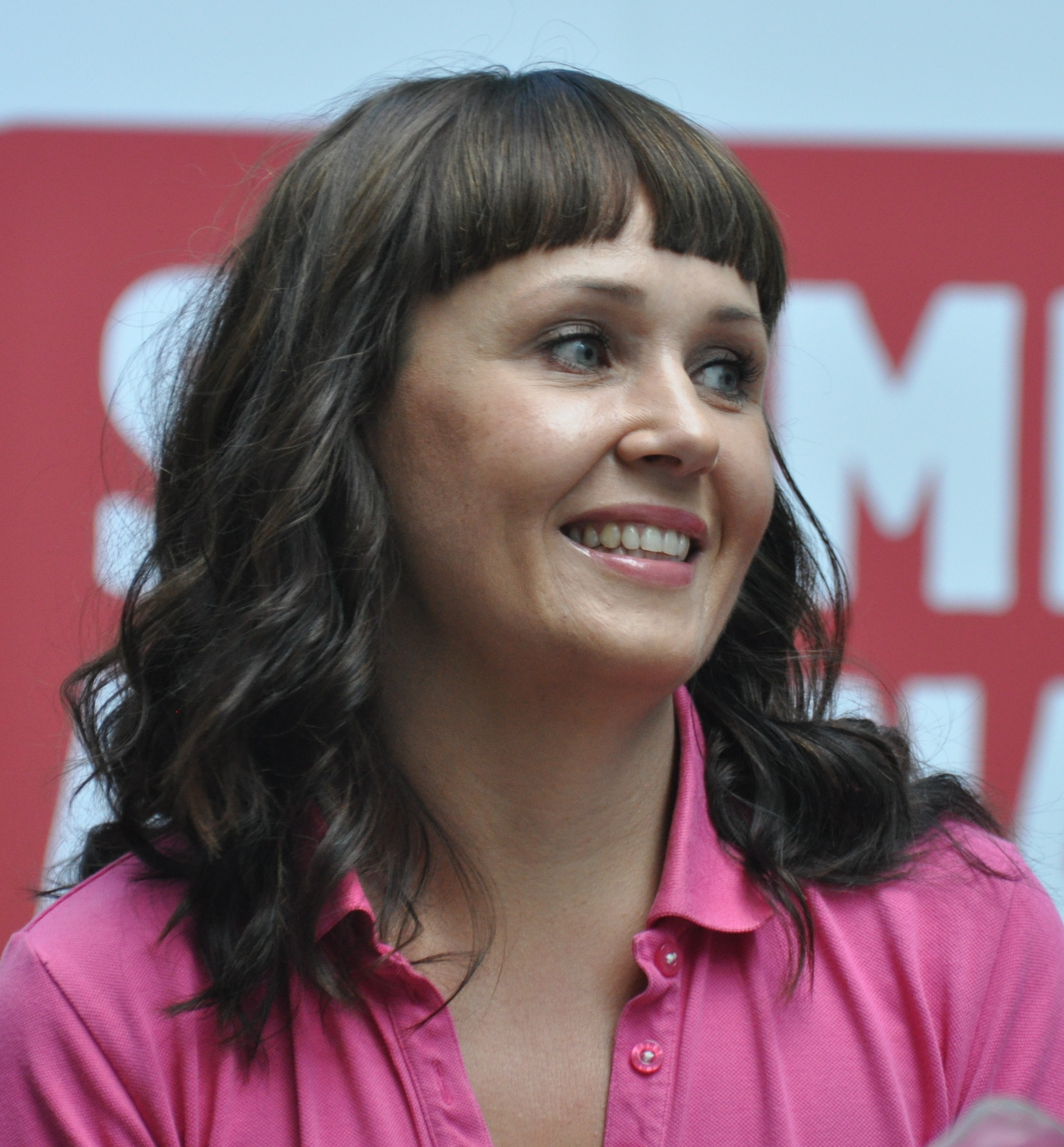
Kristiina Salonen

Kristiina Johanna Salonen (born 7 June 1977) is a Finnish politician. She has been a Member of the Parliament for the Social Democratic Party of Finland since 2011.

== Education and early career ==
Salonen was born and still lives in Rauma. She graduated as ylioppilas in 1996 and as social instructor in 2000. She has worked as a gerontological nurse and the superior for social instructing of City of Rauma.

== Political career ==
Salonen has been elected to the City Council of Rauma in 2004, 2008, 2012 and 2017. She has also been elected to the Parliament of Finland from Satakunta in 2011 and 2015. In 2015 she received 9,560 votes, more than any other candidate in Satakunta.

== Other activities ==
- Finnish Institute of International Affairs (FIIA), Member of the Advisory Council (since 2019)

== Personal life ==
Salonen is married to bank manager Rafael Eerola. Her first child was born in 2016.
