= Nordic Green Left Alliance =

Left-wing party group in the Nordic Council

Nordic Green Left Alliance: Nordisk grön vänster (Swedish); Pohjoismaiden vihreän vasemmiston liitto (Finnish); Nordisk Grønne Venstre Alliance (Danish); Nordisk Grønt Venstre Allianse (Norwegian); Norræna vinstri-græna bandalagið (Icelandic)
- Abbreviation: NGLA (English); NGV (Swedish)
- General Secretary: Mia Haglund
- Founded: 6 January 1995
- Ideology: Democratic socialism; Eco-socialism; Popular socialism; Socialism; Environmentalism; Feminism; Progressivism
- Political position: Centre-left to left-wing
- European affiliation: ELA, NTP!, EGP
- European Parliament group: The Left, Greens-EFA
- Colours: Green; Crimson
- Nordic Council: 11 / 87

Website
- nordicgreenleft.com

The Nordic Green Left Alliance (Swedish: Nordisk grön vänster; Finnish: Pohjoismaiden vihreän vasemmiston liitto; Danish: Nordisk Grønne Venstre Alliance; Norwegian: Nordisk Grønt Venstre Allianse; Icelandic: Norræna vinstri-græna bandalagið; NGLA) is a left-wing party group in the Nordic Council, founded in Reykjavík, Iceland, on 1 February 2004. Initially founded by five parties representing Norway, Sweden, Denmark, Finland and Iceland, in 2009 two other parties from Greenland and the Faroe Islands joined the NGLA.

== History ==
Initial logo

In the 1950s to 1970s, the Danish Socialist People's Party (F), the Norwegian Socialist Left Party (SV) and the Swedish Left Party – the Communists (VPK) were formed. These parties traced back to the old communist parties and were similar to eurocommunist parties in Western Europe. Similarly, the Finnish People's Democratic League and the Icelandic People's Alliance became eurocommunist.

After the 1995 enlargement of the European Union, European United Left/Nordic Green Left (GUE/NGL) was formed. In 2002, the People's Movement against the EU (N, which was backed by the Red–Green Alliance) left the Europe of Democracies and Diversities and joined GUE/NGL. Their ally, the June Movement, was only a member for a few months through Jens Okking before joining N like the Swedish June List, most of their MEPs were part of the Independence/Democracy group. Margrete Auken (F) did not join GUE/NGL opting for Greens-EFA instead in 2004. In 2009, the Faroe Republic and the Greenlandic Inuit Ataqatigiit were accepted as members.

Former logo

== Members ==
The member organisations of NGLA are:

Country	National party	Nordic Council	National MPs				European MPs		European affiliation
Country	National party	Nordic Council	# of seats	Last election	# of seats	Last election	# of seats	Last election	European affiliation
Denmark; Folketing	Green Left (Socialistisk Folkeparti)	1 / 16	15 / 175	2022	20 / 179	2026	3 / 15	2024	G/EFA (EGP)
Denmark; Folketing	Red-Green Alliance (Enhedslisten – De Rød-Grønne)	1 / 16	9 / 175	2022	11 / 179	2026	1 / 15	2024	Left (NTP–ELA)
Denmark; Folketing	The Alternative (Alternativet)	1 / 16	6 / 175	2022	5 / 179	2026	0 / 15	2024	None
Faroe Islands; Løgting	Republic (Tjóðveldi)	1 / 2	6 / 33	2026	0 / 179 0 / 2	2026	Not in EU		
Finland; Eduskunta	Left Alliance (Vasemmistoliitto/Vänsterförbundet)	1 / 18	11 / 200			2023	3 / 15	2024	Left (NTP–ELA)
Greenland; Inatsisartut	Community of the People (Inuit Ataqatigiit)	1 / 2	7 / 31	2025	1 / 179 1 / 2	2026	Not in EU		
Iceland; Althing	Left-Green Movement (Vinstrihreyfingin-grænt framboð)	1 / 7	0 / 63			2024	Not in EU		
Norway; Storting	Socialist Left Party (Sosialistisk Venstreparti/Sosialisttalaš Gurutbellodat)	2 / 20	9 / 169			2025	Not in EU		
Norway; Storting	Red Party (Rødt/Raudt/Ruoksat)	1 / 20	9 / 169			2025	Not in EU		
Sweden; Riksdag	Left Party (Vänsterpartiet)	1 / 20	24 / 349			2022	2 / 21	2024	Left (NTP–ELA)

Most of the member parties of NGLA have not joined the Party of the European Left, but NGLA participates in EL events as an observer.

In the European Parliament, the MEP of the Swedish Left Party, the Danish Red-Green Alliance and the Finnish Left Alliance are part of The Left in the European Parliament – GUE/NGL parliamentary group, whilst the Danish Socialist People's Party MEP is a member of the Greens–European Free Alliance group.

== Elected representatives of Member Parties ==
=== European institutions ===
Organisation	Institution	Number of seats
European Union	European Parliament	9 / 720 (1%)
European Union	European Commission	0 / 27 (0%)
European Union	European Council (Heads of Government)	0 / 27 (0%)
European Union	Council of the European Union (Participation in Government)	1 / 27 (4%)
European Union	Committee of the Regions	
Council of Europe	Parliamentary Assembly	3 / 612 (0.5%)

== See also ==
- The Left in the European Parliament – GUE/NGL
- Nordic Council
