= Minja Koskela =

Finnish politician (born 1987)

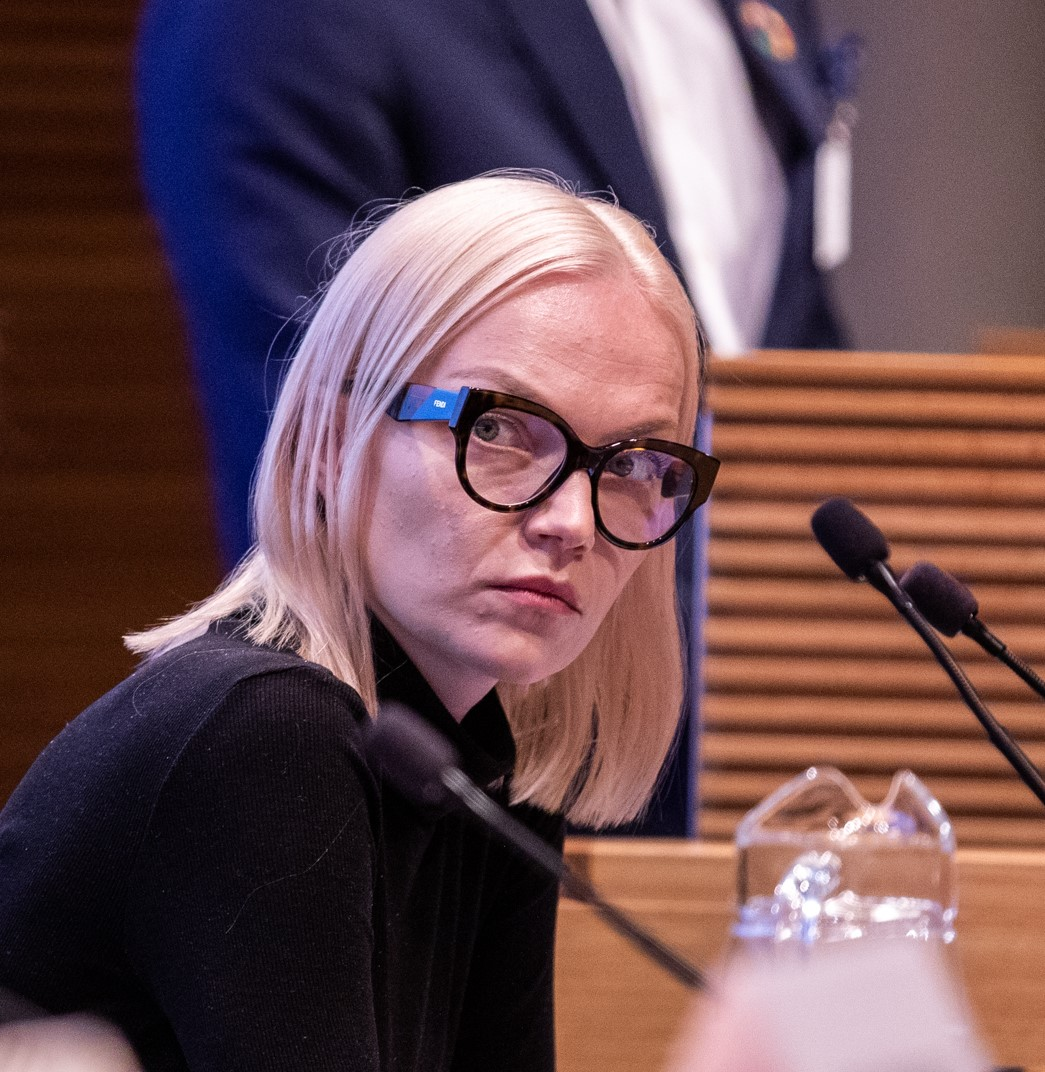
- Minja Koskela in 2022

Member of the Parliament of Finland
- Incumbent
- Assumed office 5 April 2023
- Constituency: Helsinki

Leader of the Left Alliance
- Incumbent
- Assumed office 19 October 2024
- Preceded by: Li Andersson

Personal details
- Born: Minja Koskela; 1987 (age 38–39) Heinävesi, North Karelia, Finland
- Party: Left Alliance
- Other political affiliations: Feminist Party
- Children: 1
- Education: Sibelius Academy (MusDoc); University of Tampere (MSSc)
- Profession: Musician, author, politician
- Website: minjakoskela.fi

Minja Koskela (born 1987) is a Finnish musician, author, politician, member of the Parliament of Finland, the national legislature, and chair of the Left Alliance. She has represented Helsinki since April 2023 as member of the Left Alliance.

== Early life ==
Koskela was born in 1987 in Heinävesi. Her father was a policeman and her mother a dental hygienist. She has three younger sisters. Aged three, she joined the Päijät-Häme conservatory's play school in Lahti. In the second year of high school she moved to Helsinki to study at Sibelius High School. After high school she founded the Mitäs tytöt collective. Koskela studied music at the Sibelius Academy and gender studies at the University of Tampere. She has master's degree in social science and a doctorate in music.

== Writings and education career ==
Koskela was a music teacher for five years before taking a leave of absence to write her dissertation, Democracy Through Pop? Thinking with Intersectionality in Popular Music Education in Finnish Schools (2022). Koskela started writing her social feminist blog Bluestocking in 2015 and is the author of Ennen kaikkea feministi (2019) and Äidiksi tuleminen (2021).

== Political career ==
Koskela was asked by several parties to contest parliamentary elections but declined in order to finish her book. She was the secretary to the Feminist Party on the City Council of Helsinki. She was a political expert for the Left Alliance before becoming executive director of the Association of Finnish Music Education Schools in 2021. She was elected to the City Council of Helsinki at the 2021 Finnish municipal elections. She was elected to Parliament in 2023. She became chair of the Left Alliance in October 2024.

== Personal life ==
Koskela married film director Oskari Sipola in December 2019. She gave birth to a daughter, Else, in 2020 after earlier suffering a miscarriage. The family live in the Herttoniemi suburb of Helsinki. She is a member of the Team Play band. Koskela and Sipola jointly filed for divorce in July 2024. Since 2024 Koskela has been in relationship with the Left Alliance politician and former footballer Timo Furuholm.

== Electoral history ==
Electoral history of Minja Koskela
Election	Constituency	Party	Votes	Result
2021 municipal	Helsinki	Left Alliance	5,612	Elected
2023 parliamentary	Helsinki	Left Alliance	10,112	Elected
