= 2021 Finnish municipal elections =

Largest party by vote percentage.

Second largest party by vote percentage.

Largest party by seats in the municipality council.

National Coalition
Social Democratic
Centre
Finns Party
Green League
Left Alliance
Swedish People's
Christian Democrats
Movement Now
Others

Municipal elections were held in Finland on 13 June 2021 after being rescheduled from 18 April due to the COVID-19 pandemic.

== Context ==
The last municipal elections were held in 2017 and were won by the National Coalition Party with a 20.7 percent share of the votes.

== Opinion polls ==
Poll results are listed in the table below in reverse chronological order, showing the most recent first. The highest percentage figure in each poll is displayed in bold, and the background shaded in the leading party's colour. In the instance that there is a tie, then no figure is shaded. The table uses the date the survey's fieldwork was done, as opposed to the date of publication. However, if that date is unknown, the date of publication will be given instead. List includes only polls that were made for the municipal election.

Date	Polling Firm	KOK	SDP	KESK	VIHR	PS	VAS	SFP	KD	Others	Lead
5 May and 8 June 2021	Taloustutkimus	19.6	17.0	13.0	10.9	18.0	8.5	4.8	3.6	4.7	1.6
25 May to 4 June 2021	Helsingin Sanomat	19.6	17.9	12.7	11.1	18.0	8.2	4.6	3.6	4.7	1.6
April 6 and May 4, 2021	Taloustutkimus	20.2	18.1	11.7	10.6	18.2	8.0	5.3	3.2	4.7	2.0
8–30 March 2021	Taloustutkimus	18.8	18.0	12.5	12.1	19.0	7.8	4.3	4.0	3.6	0.2
3 February and 2 March 2021	Taloustutkimus	18.0	19.5	12.8	11.0	18.7	9.1	4.3	3.7	2.9	0.9
11 January and 2 February 2021	Taloustutkimus	18.3	20.3	12.9	11.4	18.8	7.2	4.7	3.0	1.8	2.0
**28 October 2017**	**Election Results**	**20.7**	**19.4**	**17.5**	**12.5**	**8.8**	**8.8**	**4.9**	**4.1**	**3.3**	**1.3**

=== Helsinki polls ===
Date	Polling Firm	KOK	VIHR	SDP	VAS	PS	SFP	KESK	KD	Others	Lead
17–27 May 2021	Kantar TNS	23.2	21.3	13.9	11.5	13.1	5.2	2.5	1.5	4.1	2.0
26–28 March 2021	Taloustutkimus	25	21	15	13	12	4	2	1	6	4.0
**28 October 2017**	**Election Results**	**28.3**	**24.1**	**13.8**	**11.2**	**6.7**	**5.8**	**2.8**	**2.8**	**4.5**	**4.2**

== Election schedule ==
Event or other	Date (in 2021)
Confirmation of the voting right registry (checking who is eligible to vote in which municipality)	23 April
Dead line for candidate application	4 May
Confirmation of the candidates and electoral numbers	14 May
Legality of the voter register	25 May
Dead line for requesting voting at home	1 June, at 16:00
Advance polling in Finland	26 May – 8 June
Advance polling overseas	2–5 June
Election day	13 June
Ratification of the results	16 June
New municipal councils start working	1 August

== Results ==
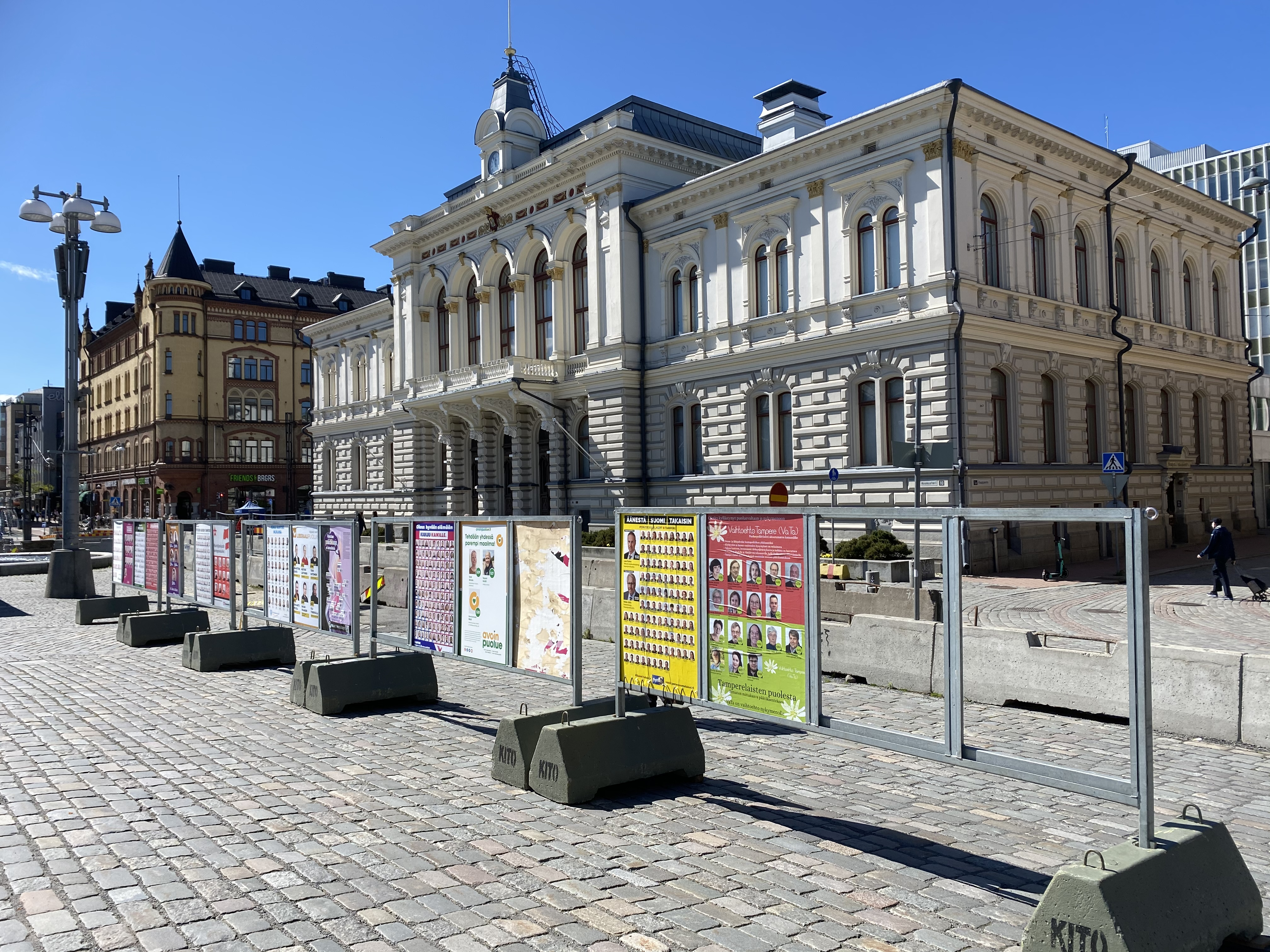
Election posters in Tampere

Most parties, such as the Social Democratic Party, Centre Party, Green League, and the Left Alliance showed a decline in their vote share and council seats. The National Coalition Party had a small increase, while the biggest winner was the Finns Party, who saw a major increase in vote share and council seats. The 14.5% they received is the highest vote share in municipal elections since the party's foundation. The party is now the largest group on at least six councils: in Hamina, Orimattila, Kihniö, Ylöjärvi, Kankaanpää and Hämeenkyrö.

Party	Votes				Council seats	
Party	Number	%	Swing (2017)	Swing (2021)	Number	Net ±
National Coalition	522,077	21,4%	−1.2pp	+0,7pp	1,554	+64
SDP	433,008	17,7%	–0.2pp	-1,7pp	1,449	−248
Centre	363,136	14,9%	–1.1pp	-2,6pp	2,448	−376
Finns	354,019	14,5%	–3,5pp	+5,7pp	1,350	+580
Green	258,624	10,6%	+3.9pp	-1,9pp	432	−102
Left Alliance	194,146	7,9%	+0.8pp	-0,9pp	508	−150
RKP	121,236	5.0%	+0.2pp	+0,1pp	463	−8
KD	88,144	3,6%	+0.4pp	-0,5pp	309	−7
Others	50,388	2.1%			293	+285
Liik	38,854	1,6%		+0,0 %	49	+49
Kristall.	6,285	0,3%		+0,0 %	0	0
Feminist Party	4,036	0,2%		+0,0 %	0	0
Pirate	2,591	0,1 %		+0,0 %	0	0
Communist Party of Finland	2,072	0,1 %		+0,0 %	0	0
EOP	1,753	0,1 %		+0,0 %	0	0
Sin.	1,191	0,0%		+0,0 %	4	0
Liberal Party	949	0,0%		+0,0 %	0	0
The Open Party	432	0,0%		+0,0 %	0	0
SKE	196	0,0 %		+0,0 %	0	0
Citizens' Party	40	0,0 %		+0,0 %	0	0
Total					8,859	−140

Source: Yle
