= Left Youth (Finland) =

Finnish political youth organization

The Left Youth Vasemmistonuoret
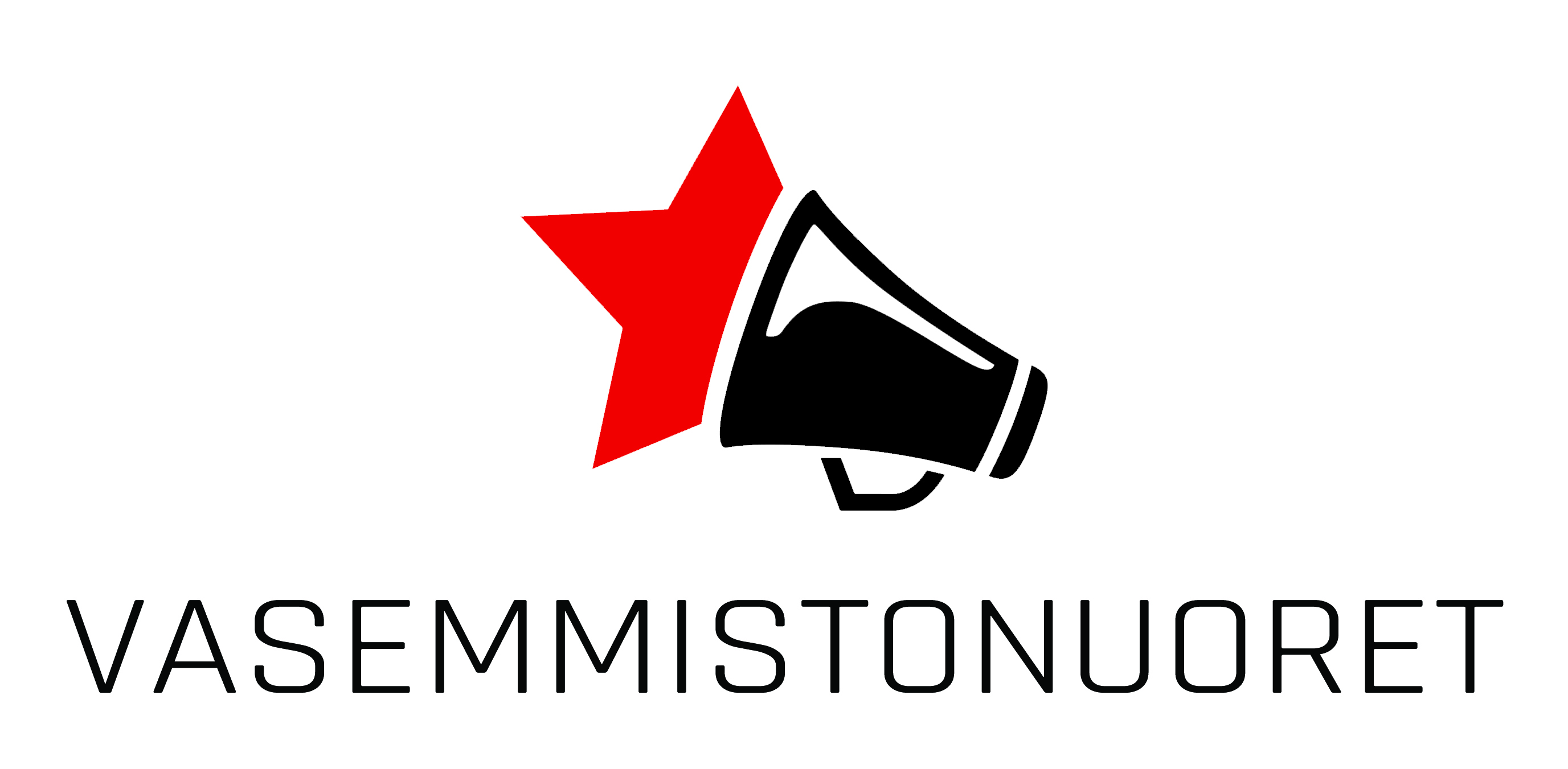
- Chairperson: Heta Uhtio
- Founded: 1944
- Headquarters: Helsinki, Finland
- Ideology: Democratic socialism Eco-socialism; Feminism
- Mother party: Left Alliance
- Nordic affiliation: Socialistisk Ungdom i Norden (SUN)
- Magazine: Libero
- Website: vasemmistonuoret.fi

The Left Youth (Vasemmistonuoret in Finnish, Vänsterunga in Swedish) is a political youth organization in Finland. It is considered the youth wing of the Left Alliance, but it is not officially affiliated with the party - members of the Left Youth are not automatically members of the Left Alliance.

The organization was founded in 1944. Until 1998, it was known as the Finnish Democratic Youth League (SDNL, Suomen demokraattinen nuorisoliitto) and until 1990 it served as the youth organization of the now-defunct Finnish People's Democratic League (SKDL). SDNL was a founding member of World Federation of Democratic Youth, but its main international frame used to be the European Network of Democratic Young Left until its dissolution.

== Chairpersons ==
- Heta Uhtio 2026-
- Pinja Vuorinen 2022-2025
- Liban Sheikh 2020–2021
- Hanna-Marilla Zidan 2017–2019
- Anni Ahlakorpi 2015–2017
- Li Andersson 2011–2015
- Dan Koivulaakso 2009–2011
- Jussi Saramo 2005–2009
- Paavo Arhinmäki 2001–2005
- Sanna-Kaisa Cortés Téllez 1997–2001
- Marjo Katajisto 1995–1997
- Marko Autio 1991–1995
- Leena Ruotsalainen 1987–1991
- Rauno Merisaari 1985–1988

- Harri Moisio 1982–1985
- Markku Kärkkäinen 1976–1982
- Pekka Saarnio 1970–1976
- Ossi Sjöman 1964–1970
- Anna-Liisa Tiekso-Isaksson 1955–1964
- Markus Kainulainen 1952–1955
- Toivo Karppinen 1947–1952
- Yrjö Ahomaa 1945–1947
