= Aino-Kaisa Pekonen =

Finnish politician (born 1979)

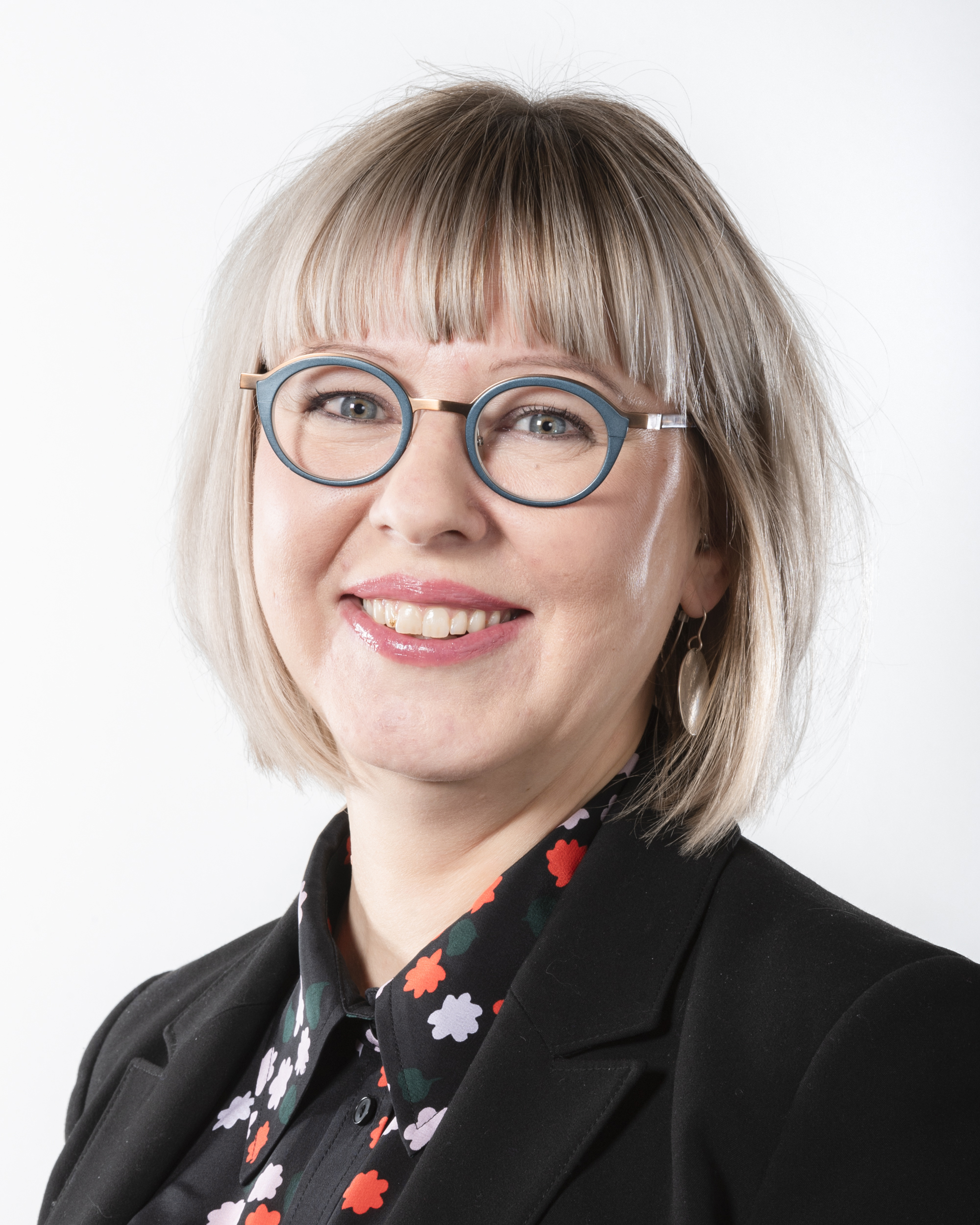
- Pekonen in 2019

Minister of Social Affairs and Health
- In office 6 June 2019 – 29 June 2021
- Prime Minister: Antti Rinne; Sanna Marin
- Preceded by: Pirkko Mattila
- Succeeded by: Hanna Sarkkinen

Member of the Finnish Parliament for Häme
- Incumbent
- Assumed office 20 April 2011
- Parliamentary group: Left Alliance

Personal details
- Born: Aino-Kaisa Ilona Pekonen; 24 January 1979 (age 47) Riihimäki, Häme Province, Finland
- Party: Left Alliance
- Education: Hyvinkää School of Healthcare
- Occupation: Practical nurse
- Website: http://www.aino-kaisa.fi/

Aino-Kaisa Ilona Pekonen (born 24 January 1979) is a Finnish politician of the Left Alliance. Pekonen was Finland's Minister of Social Affairs and Health from 6 June 2019 until 29 June 2021. She has been a member of the Parliament of Finland since the 2011 election, and represents the Left Alliance in the municipal council of Riihimäki.

Pekonen originally served as a practical nurse. She has represented the constituency of Tavastia in the parliament since April 2011. She has previously served both as the chair of the Left Alliance Parliament Group and as a member of the Parliament's Social Affairs and Health Committee. She has also previously been the first deputy chair of the Left Alliance.

In January 2016, Pekonen announced her candidacy for the leadership of the Left Alliance. She withdrew from the race on 6 June 2016, after losing the advisory membership vote of the party to Li Andersson.

Pekonen's brother is the actor Aku Hirviniemi. Both of the siblings' parents are politicians of the Left Alliance.

In 2023, Pekonen competed on Amazing Race Suomi with Silvia Modig. The two were eliminated in the second episode in Phuket.
