= Now the People =

Left-wing European political alliance

Now the People !: Det er Folkets tur Nu (Danish); Nyt on Ihmisten Vuoro ! (Finnish); Maintenant le Peuple ! (French); Ora il Popolo! (Italian); Agora o Povo ! (Portuguese); Ahora la Gente (Spanish); Det är Folkets tur Nu (Swedish)
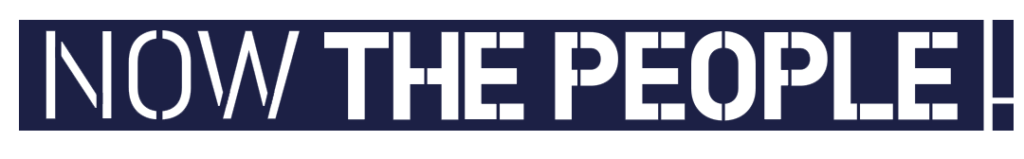
- Founded: April 2018
- Split from: Party of the European Left
- Ideology: Democratic socialism Eco-socialism; Left-wing populism
- Political position: Left-wing
- European Parliament group: The Left in the European Parliament
- European Parliament: 24 / 720 (3%)
- European Lower Houses: 156 / 6,217 (3%)
- European Upper Houses: 3 / 1,459 (0.2%)

Website
- nowthepeople.eu

Now the People ! (NTP) (Note: French: Maintenant le Peuple ! Danish: Det er Folkets tur Nu Finnish: Nyt on Ihmisten Vuoro ! Portuguese: Agora o Povo ! Spanish: Ahora la Gente Swedish: Det är Folkets tur nu) is a left-wing European political alliance. It was founded in April 2018 by a declaration from Catarina Martins from the Portuguese party Bloco de Esquerda (Left Bloc), Pablo Iglesias from the Spanish party Podemos, and Jean-Luc Mélenchon, leader of La France Insoumise (LFI), a French socialist party.

== History ==
After concerns about the austerity policies pursued by the Greek government under Alexis Tsipras and his Syriza party, the leaders of the leftist La France insoumise (LFI) departed the Party of the European Left, joined by Iglesias and Podemos as well as Martins and Bloco. In June 2018, the Danish Red–Green Alliance, Finnish Left Alliance and the Swedish Left Party announced that they were affiliating with their French, Spanish and Portuguese counterparts and forming Now The People ! (NTP).

Power to the People, a coalition of several small left-wing parties and organisations in Italy, also "lent its support" to NTP, calling it "a very important call proposed by three of the most popular alternatives from Europe [Left Bloc, Podemos and La France Insoumise], which we cannot ignore." However, as Potere al Popolo did not participate in the 2019 European Parliament election, and as it had no incumbent MEPs in the eighth European Parliament, it is not a full member of MLP.

In the European elections, parties associated with NTP won a total of 14 seats. LFI won six seats, the most out of NTP's constituent parties.

In the ninth European Parliament, NTP joined with other left-wing parties and independents, including the Party of the European Left from which NTP split, in the European United Left–Nordic Green Left group.

Ahead of the 2024 European Parliament election, the leaders of the six NTP parties signed on to a common manifesto after meeting in Paris. At that election, overall NTP representation increased from 13 MEPs to 18, with LFI sending nine MEPs, the Left Alliance sending three, Podemos and the Left Party sending two, and the Red–Green Alliance and Left Bloc sending one apiece. The alliance also released a manifesto, 10 points for a Green Left Europe: Europe for the People, signed by the six member parties, along with Italian political party Italian Left, German political party The Left, Basque political party EH Bildu, and Luxembourgish political party The Left.

After the 2024 European Parliament election, Italian Left, which elected two MEPs within the Greens and Left Alliance, and the German party The Left, which elected three MEPs, announced their formal affiliations with the Now the People, bringing the total number of elected MEPs to 23.

On 19 September 2024, Manon Aubry announced that the six original members of NTP, along with the Polish party Left Together, were creating a new European political party in the coming months. Those seven parties had previously formed the European Left Alliance for the People and the Planet.

== Members ==
There are currently eight members of NTP.

Name	Country	Leader	2024 election list leader	Ideology	Position	European political party	MEPs	National MPs	Government
Red–Green Alliance; Enhedslisten – De Rød-Grønne	Denmark	Collective leadership (Note: Pelle Dragsted is the party's political spokesperson and de facto leader)	Per Clausen	Socialism; Eco-socialism; Euroscepticism	Left-wing to far-left	ELA	1 / 15	11 / 179	External support
The Left; Die Linke	Germany	Ines Schwerdtner; Jan van Aken	Martin Schirdewan; Carola Rackete	Democratic socialism Left-wing populism	Left-wing	EL	3 / 96	64 / 736	Opposition
Left Alliance; Vasemmistoliitto; Vänsterförbundet	Finland	Minja Koskela	Li Andersson	Democratic socialism Eco-socialism	Left-wing	ELA	3 / 15	11 / 200	Opposition
France Unbowed; La France Insoumise (within New Popular Front)	France	Manuel Bompard	Manon Aubry	Democratic socialism Eco-socialism; Anti-globalisation politics	Left-wing to far-left	ELA	9 / 81	71 / 577 0 / 348	Opposition
Italian Left; Sinistra Italiana (within Greens and Left Alliance)	Italy	Nicola Fratoianni	N/A (Note: Italy uses regional lists for European Parliament elections, and as part of its coalition agreement within the Green and Left Alliance, SI did not have a leading candidate in any region.)	Democratic socialism Eco-socialism	Left-wing	ELA	2 / 76	4 / 400 3 / 200	Opposition
Left Bloc; Bloco de Esquerda	Portugal	Collective leadership (Note: Mariana Mortágua is the party's coordinator of political affairs and de facto leader)	Catarina Martins	Socialism; Eco-socialism; Soft Euroscepticism	Left-wing to far-left	ELA	1 / 21	1 / 230	Opposition
We Can; Podemos	Spain	Ione Belarra	Irene Montero	Democratic socialism Direct democracy Left-wing populism	Left-wing to far-left	ELA	2 / 61	4 / 350 0 / 265	External support
Left Party; Vänsterpartiet	Sweden	Nooshi Dadgostar	Jonas Sjöstedt	Socialism; Feminism; Soft Euroscepticism	Left-wing	ELA	2 / 21	24 / 349	Opposition
