= Paavo Arhinmäki =

Finnish politician (born 1976)

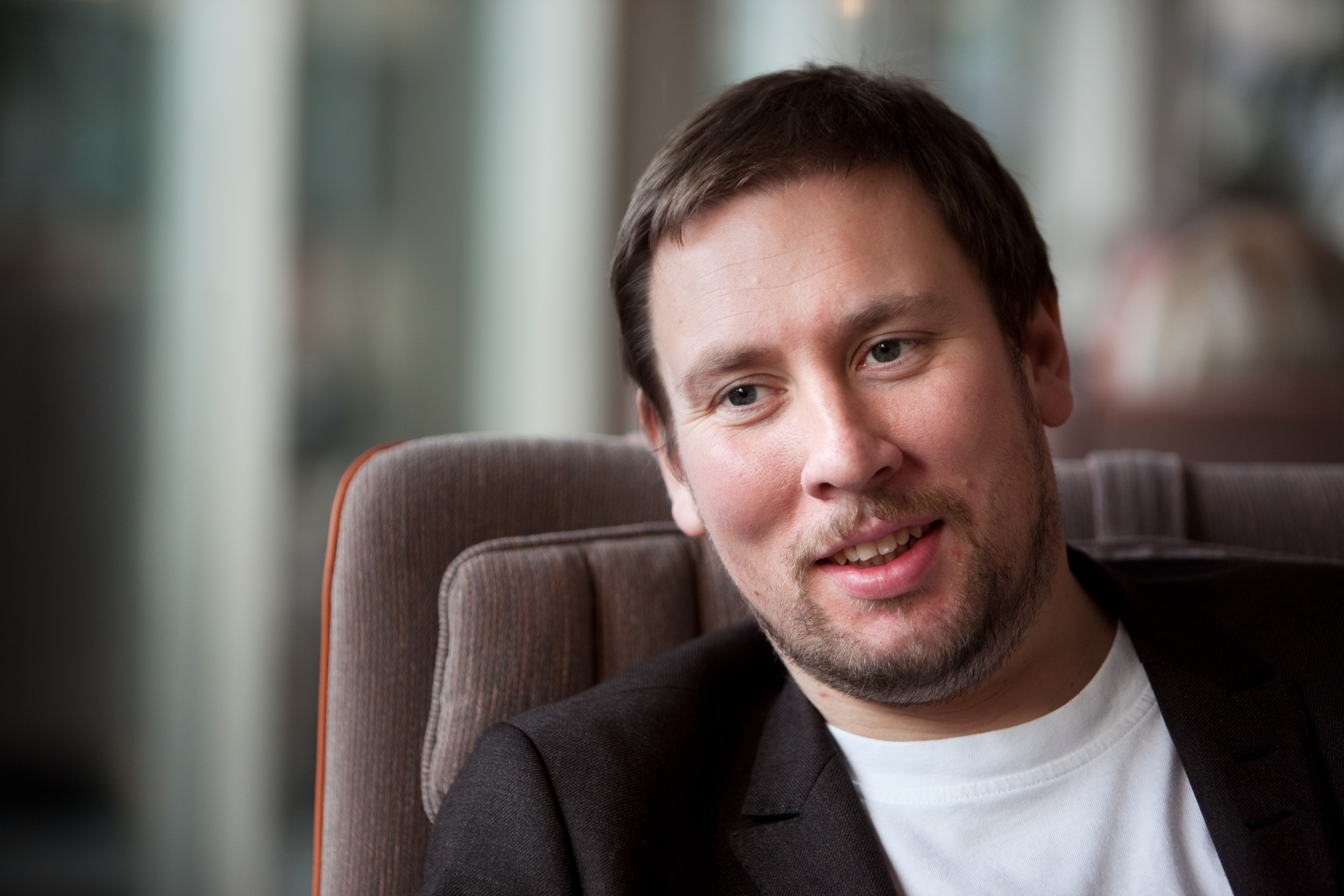

Minister of Culture and Sport
- In office 22 June 2011 – 4 April 2014
- Prime Minister: Jyrki Katainen
- Preceded by: Stefan Wallin
- Succeeded by: Pia Viitanen

Member of the Finnish Parliament
- In office 21 March 2007 – 2021
- Constituency: Helsinki

Personal details
- Born: 13 December 1976 (age 49) Helsinki, Uusimaa, Finland
- Party: Left Alliance

Paavo Erkki Arhinmäki (born 13 December 1976) is a Finnish politician and Helsinki Deputy Mayor for Culture and Leisure since 2021. He was a member of the Finnish Parliament from 2007 til 2021 representing the Left Alliance, a party whose leader he was from 2009 until 2016.

== Early life ==
Born in Helsinki, Arhinmäki grew up in Pasila, Helsinki.

== Career ==
Arhinmäki was first elected to the Finnish Parliament in the 2007 election and re-elected in 2011. Arhinmäki has been a member of the City Council of Helsinki since 2001. He led the Left Youth in 2001–2005.

After the 2011 election, the Left Alliance became a partner in the six-party grand coalition cabinet led by Jyrki Katainen. The decision to join the government created a split in the party, leading to the expulsion of two MPs from the parliamentary group. Arhinmäki became Minister of Culture and Sport and the party gained the Minister of Transport portfolio as well. Later Arhinmäki became the subject of media criticism after a drinking binge at the Sochi Winter Olympics in February 2014. In 2014 Left Alliance left the cabinet due to the government's cuts in social welfare.

In 2012 Arhinmäki was a Left Alliance candidate in the Finnish Presidential Elections, finishing 6th with 5.5% of the total votes in the first round of voting.

In April 2016, Arhinmäki announced that he would not seek another term as the party leader. On 11 June 2016, he was followed by Li Andersson.

=== Criminal conviction for the act of graffiti in 2023 ===
In 2023, Arhinmäki, now the deputy mayor of Helsinki, was caught with another person painting graffiti that included the words "world domination and great career moves" in English on the walls of a train underpass in eastern Helsinki on Midsummer Eve. He subsequently apologized and was fined €2,520 by a court in January 2024.

== Personal life ==
Arhinmäki is publicly an active supporter of the Helsinki-based clubs FC Jokerit and HC Jokerit, and has been part of the ultra supporter group 116% boys. He has also played football for SAPA.
