= Libero (magazine) =

Finnish political youth magazine

- Editor-in-chief: Joonas Pulkkinen
- Categories: Political magazine
- Frequency: Quarterly
- Publisher: Libero ry
- Founded: 1945
- Country: Finland
- Based in: Helsinki
- Language: Finnish
- Website: liberolehti.fi

Libero is a political youth magazine published in Helsinki, Finland. The magazine targets left-wing youth in the country and has been in circulation since 1945.

== History and profile ==
The magazine was started in 1945 under the name Terä. It was published under this title until 1981 and was renamed Uusi valta in 1982. In 1987 the magazine changed its title to Libero. It is published quarterly. Its target audience is left-wing youth. In fact, it is the official magazine of the Left Youth of Finland (Finnish: Vasemmistonuoret). As of 2022 Joonas Pulkkinen is the editor-in-chief of the magazine.

== See also ==
List of magazines in Finland
