= Hanna Sarkkinen =

Finnish politician

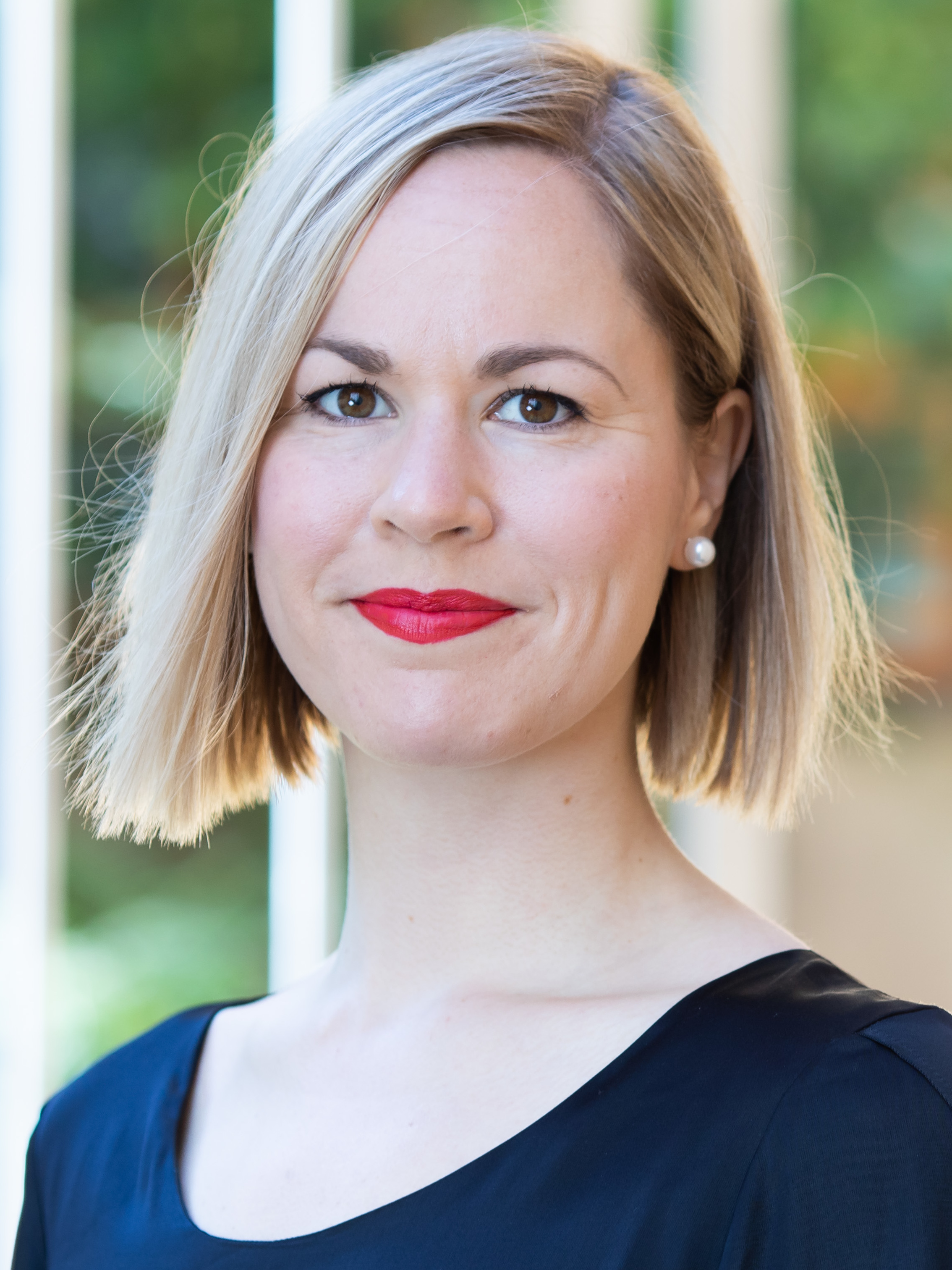
- Sarkkinen in 2021

Minister of Social Affairs and Health
- In office 29 June 2021 – 20 June 2023
- Prime Minister: Sanna Marin
- Preceded by: Aino-Kaisa Pekonen
- Succeeded by: Kaisa Juuso

Member of the Finnish Parliament for Oulu
- Incumbent
- Assumed office 22 April 2015
- Parliamentary group: Left Alliance

Personal details
- Born: Hanna Maria Katariina Sarkkinen; 18 April 1988 (age 37) Oulunsalo, North Ostrobothnia, Finland
- Party: Left Alliance

Hanna Maria Katariina Sarkkinen (born 18 April 1988 in Oulunsalo) is a Finnish politician currently serving in the Parliament of Finland for the Left Alliance for the Oulu constituency.

In June 2021, she was appointed Minister of Social Affairs and Health by President Sauli Niinistö. In the end of January 2022, she was able to announce several measures taken to tackle the COVID-19 pandemic in Finland will be lifted, following the example of Denmark. In June 2022, she traveled to Estonia to coordinate the accommodation and social security systems between the two countries for the Ukrainians fleeing the Russo-Ukrainian war. Despite her party being undecided whether to support or oppose a NATO membership would provide, Sarkkinen personally supported the membership bid.
