= The Left in the European Parliament =

Left-wing political group of the European Parliament

- European Parliament group
- Name: The Left in the European Parliament – GUE/NGL
- English abbr.: The Left – GUE/NGL; The Left
- Ideology: Democratic socialism
- Political position: Left-wing (Note: Sources describe the group as either left-wing, left-wing to far-left, or far-left.)
- European parties: European Left Alliance for the People and the Planet; Party of the European Left
- From: 6 January 1995; 31 years ago
- Preceded by: European United Left
- Chaired by: Manon Aubry; Martin Schirdewan
- MEP(s): 45 / 720 (6%)
- Website: left.eu

The Left in the European Parliament – GUE/NGL (The Left – GUE/NGL), until January 2021 named the European United Left/Nordic Green Left (GUE/NGL), is a left-wing political group of the European Parliament established in 1995. As the most left-wing group in the European Parliament, it is mainly composed of anti-capitalist and democratic socialist parties, as well as some communist and eco-socialist parties, the Nordic Green Left Alliance (NGLA), the social democratic Greek Syriza (ΣΥΡΙΖΑ), and the populist Italian Five Star Movement (M5S).

The Left originated from the European United Left (EUL). As of 2024, the group was always part of the European Parliament, often being the fifth largest political group. After debuting with 34 members of the European Parliament (MEPs) and rising to 42 by 1999, the group fell to 35 seats in 2009. It obtained its best result in 2014 with 52 seats. After dropping to 41 MEPs in 2019 amid a green wave, it rebounded to 46 in 2024 as further parties joined the group.

Although the group has never been part of the governing coalition, the Left has exerted its influence in the European Parliament and at times formed a centre-left majority in some key votes. The Left advocates for a more social, just, and democratic European Union (EU), opposing its austerity and neoliberal policies while favouring European integration.

== History ==
=== Background and establishment ===
The Left dates its history of "the alternative and radical left in the European Parliament" the Communists and Allies Group (COM), which underwent a change in 1989 when four parties, namely the Danish Socialist People's Party (SF), the Greek Synaspismos (SYN), the Italian Communist Party (PCI), and the Spanish United Left (IU) formed the EUL together, then known as the "European Unitarian Left", before it changed its name to the "European United Left" in 1992. The remaining parties, namely the French Communist Party (PCF), the Communist Party of Greece (KKE), and the Portuguese Communist Party (PCP), were joined by one MEP from the Irish Workers' Party to form the Left Unity Group (LUG). In early 1993, the PCI was renamed the Democratic Party of the Left (PDS), which had joined the Socialist International in 1991 to reflect its post-Communist status, moved from the EUL to the Party of European Socialists (PES).

In the 1994 European Parliament election, the EUL elected 28 MEPs, down from the 42 of 1989. After the election, a grouping of the parties to the left of social democracy began. In 1995, the enlargement of the EU led to the creation of the Nordic Green Left Alliance. The NGLA merged with the Confederal Group of the European United Left (CGUE) on 6 January 1995, forming the Confederal Group of the European United Left/Nordic Green Left (GUE/NGL). Having rose to 34 MEPs, the NGL suffix was added to the name of the expanded group at the insistence of Finnish and Swedish MEPs, and highlights its Scandinavian tradition with left-wing environmentalist groups. The group initially consisted of MEPs from the SF (Denmark), the Finnish Left Alliance (VAS), the PCF (France), the SYN and KKE (Greece), the Communist Refoundation Party (PRC, Italy), the PCP (Portugal), the IU (including the Communist Party of Spain, PCE), and the Swedish Left Party (V). The first president of the group was the Spanish Alonso Puerta of IU. In 1998, Ken Coates, an MEP expelled from the British Labour Party and who co-founded the Independent Labour Network, joined the group.

=== 1999–2014 ===
In the 1999 European Parliament election, the GUE/NGL rose to 42 seats and all the outgoing members parties were successful in securing parliamentary representation. That same year, the German Party of Democratic Socialism (PDS) and the Greek Democratic Social Movement (DIKKI) joined as full members, while the five MEPs elected from the list of the French Trotskyist alliance between Lutte Ouvrière (LO) and the Revolutionary Communist League (LCR) and the one MEP for the Dutch Socialist Party (SP) joined as associate members. As Puerta did not run in the election, Francis Wurtz of the PCF was elected as the group's new president. In 2002, four MEPs from the French Citizen and Republican Movement (MRC) and one from the Danish People's Movement against the EU also joined the group. During the Fifth European Parliament, a total of 8 MEPs joined the GUE/NGL, such as the German Ilka Schröder from the Greens/European Free Alliance (G/FA) and the Danish Freddy Blak from the PES in 2001; the Danish Ole Krarup and Jens Okking from Europe of Democracies and Diversities (EDD), and the French Gérard Gaudron, Michel Dary, Sami Nair, and Michel-Angel Scarbonchi from the PES in 2002. This brought the group numbers up to 49 MEPs from ten countries, which at that time was highest ever representation in the European Parliament, and made it the fourth largest parliamentary group.

In 2003, as part of the EU accession process of 10 new member states, observers joined the GUE/NGL from Cyprus (2), Czech Republic (3), Latvia (1), and Slovakia (1). These became full MEPs on 1 May 2004. In the 2004 European Parliament election, the group remained stable at 41 MEPs, only losing one seat compared to 1999. Although no candidates were elected from LO–LCR and DIKKI, which was undergoing a dispute with its leader over the party constitution, and the French MRC did not put forward candidates, MEPs from the Portuguese Left Bloc (BE), the Irish Sinn Féin, the Progressive Party of Working People (AKEL) of Cyprus, and the Communist Party of Bohemia and Moravia (KSČM) joined the group. The Danish SF, a member of the NGLA, left the group to instead sit in the G/FA group, although it later re-joined GUE/NGL. Around 14 outgoing delegations were returned with 38 MEPs. In total, the GUE/NGL had 41 members from 14 member states, and Wurtz was re-elected president of the group.

In the 2009 European Parliament election, the GUE/NGL obtained its worst result and declined to 35 seats and 12 member states. This was partially as a result of no MEPs being elected from the Italian PRC and the Finnish VAS. Several new delegations joined the group. MEPs from the Irish Socialist Party, the Socialist Party of Latvia (LSP), and the French Left Party (PG) joined the group, while The Left (Die Linke) in Germany became the largest party in the group with 8 seats. In France, the Left Front (FG) elected MEPs from the PCF and the PG. The French delegation also included a member from the Communist Party of Réunion. Wurtz, who had been an MEP since 1979, did not run for re-election and the German Lothar Bisky of Die Linke was elected. In 2013, one MEP from the Croatian Labourists – Labour Party (HL–SR) joined the GUE/NGL. In 2014, no MEPs were elected from the Irish Socialist Party, the LSP, and the HL–SR. MEPs from the Spanish Podemos and EH Bildu, as well as the Dutch Party for the Animals (PvdD), joined the group while MEPs from the Finnish VAS and the Italian PRC re-entered the European Parliament and thus also in the GUE/NGL. The KKE, a founding member of the group, decided to leave and instead sat as Non-Inscrits (NI).

=== 2014–2024 ===
Chaired by the German Gabriele Zimmer of Die Linke, elected on 15 March 2012 and re-elected in 2014, the GUE/NGL obtained its best result ever in the 2014 European Parliament election when it won 52 seats and was the fifth-largest group in the European Parliament, behind the Alliance of Liberals and Democrats for Europe (ALDE) but ahead of the G/EFA. This was a 50% increase in the group's size to 52 MEPs and many new MEPs joined the GUE/NGL, such as those from The Other Europe (AET, Italy) and Podemos (Spain), and Luke 'Ming' Flanagan, an independent member from Ireland. The GUE/NGL was also joined by two animal rights parties, namely the German Human Environment Animal Protection Party (PMUT) and the Dutch PvdD, plus the left-wing nationalist and regionalist Bildu from the Basque Country in Spain. The GUE/NGL also became the only parliamentary group to have gender equality among its MEPs, with an equal number of men and women. The Bildu MEP resigned in 2018 and was replaced by an MEP who joined the G/EFA. In November 2018, the French Emmanuel Maurel joined the GUE/NGL from the Progressive Alliance of Socialists and Democrats (S&D).

In March 2019, the GUE/NGL called for the then European Parliament President Antonio Tajani's immediate resignation after he made the well-known but unsubstantiated claim and myth that the Italian fascist leader Benito Mussolini made trains run on time. Although Tajani retracted his comments, stating that he is not a fascist, the group said it "cannot be represented by a president who tolerates the Fascist initiator himself". That same month, the group said it supported moves for Greta Thunberg to address the plenary in Strasbourg but that the proposal was blocked by other groups, citing the ALDE, the European People's Party (EPP), the European Conservatives and Reformists Party (ECR), Europe of Freedom and Direct Democracy (EFDD), and Europe of Nations and Freedom (ENF).

In the 2019 European Parliament election, which saw the rise of the G/EFA, the GUE/NGL declined, achieving 41 seats. Despite this, the majority of political parties and delegations were re-elected, led by La France Insoumise (LFI), Syriza (Greece), and Die Linke (Germany), and the group participated in policy discussions, aiming to influence EU policies, particularly social, economic, and environmental ones. No MEPs were elected from the Danish People's Movement against the EU, the PCF, the Italian PRC and The Left (LS) electoral list, and the Dutch PS. MEPs from the LFI, the Belgian Workers' Party of Belgium (PTB-PVDA), the German PMUT, the Irish Independents 4 Change (I4C), and the Danish Red–Green Alliance (EL) joined the group. In doing so, the GUE/NGL welcomed its first ever Belgian member through the PTB-PVDA. Meanwhile, the Danish Red–Green Alliance (EL) joined the group in place of the People's Movement against the EU, along with the return of MEPs from Bildu. Pro-animal rights and environmental rights parties continued to be represented through the German PMUT and the Dutch PvdD. From I4C came two new Irish MEPs. The group's candidate for president of the European Parliament was the Spanish Sira Rego of IU. As a result of Brexit, the group was projected to lose one seat while gaining none.

In January 2021 the GUE/NGL changed its name to The Left in the European Parliament – GUE/NGL. Prior to the 2024 European Parliament election, The Left was the sixth-largest political group in terms of members, with 37 MEPs from 13 countries, representing around 5% of the 705 available seats. The two largest delegations were from France and Spain, with six MEPs each, and was co-chaired by Manon Aubry of LFI and Martin Schirdewan of Die Linke. In 2024, The Left rose to 46 seats. After the 2024 European Parliament election in Italy, it became the first time the country represented the group's largest delegation with 10 seats after the two MEPs from Italian Left (SI), which is part of the Greens and Left Alliance (AVS), and the eight from the M5S joined the group.

== Political positions ==
According to its 1994 constituent declaration, the Left is opposed to the present EU political structure but is committed to European integration. That declaration sets out three aims for the construction of another EU, the total change of institutions to make them fully democratic, breaking with neoliberal monetarist policies, and a policy of co-development and equitable cooperation. The group wanted to disband the North Atlantic Treaty Organization (NATO) but strengthen the Organization for Security and Co-operation in Europe (OSCE). The Left is divided between reformism and revolution, leaving it up to each party to decide on the manner they deem best suited to achieve their aims. As such, it simultaneously positioned itself as insiders within the European institutions, enabling it to influence the decisions made by co-decision, and as outsiders by its willingness to seek another Europe, which would abolish the Maastricht Treaty. For example, the group was part of a centre-left majority in some key votes. Despite some internal opposition, a report on a piece of legislation securing online privacy rights was narrowly agreed by a centre-left majority including the GUE/NGL. In 2019, the GUE/NGL joined the G/EFA in supporting the S&D and Renew Europe (RE) against Manfred Weber as European Commissioner, with the smallest centre-left majority (377 seats).

The Left is a relatively big tent and heterogeneous group of left-wing politics and socialist and communist parties, including anti-capitalism, communism, democratic socialism, and eco-socialism. In terms of voters, its main competitors are from the other left-leaning political groups, such as the S&D and the G/EFA. The member parties share opposition to austerity and thus support the anti-austerity movement, the promotion of a new model of ecological development, the reform of the EU's political structure to make it more democratic, and a policy of international solidarity based on respect for human rights. Other common ground among its members is the defence of social rights, the promotion of tax justice, the fight against inequality, and environmental protection. The Left also fights for a more united and transparent EU. The newspaper L'Opinion has opined that it perceives the group to represent the more radical left. Elsewhere it has been described as part of left-wing and far-left EU politics.

The Left has some soft Eurosceptic traits, which are contrasted to the hard Euroscepticism of the far-right, at that time represented in the Identity and Democracy (I&D) group. The group's Euroscepticism is placed within the context of an anti-austerity and anti-capitalist perspective rather than a right-wing nationalist one. In line with its first political declaration, The Left is in favour of further integration but is opposed to the neoliberal nature of the EU, and advocates for more cooperation between stronger and weaker EU member states, as well as for further protection of the environment. Among the reforms of the EU called by the group, they are related to environmental sustainability and social justice, a more equal redistribution of wealth, and workers' rights. The Left emphasizes democracy, peace, solidarity, sustainable development, and a just green transition towards renewable energy, as well as environmental justice, the protection of biodiversity, and nature conservation, for example through strict regulation of toxic chemicals. The Left is also a supporter of the animal rights movement and animal welfare, advocating for sustainable agricultural and fisheries policies while emphasizing support for small communities.

On trade policy policy, The Left is critical of agreements like the EU–Chile Advanced Framework Agreement (AFA), highlighting concerns over corporate interests, environmental degradation, and indigenous rights. The Left favours fair trade policies aligned with ecologism and solidarity, rejecting deals that they view in favour of corporate profits rather than sustainability. Among its legislative efforts was the Nature Restoration Law. In relation to the food price crisis and genetically modified organisms (GMOs), the Left emphasizes consumer choice, safety assessments, and fair prices. On foreign policy, the group supports internationalism and pacifism, or otherwise anti-war and anti-militarist views, favouring multilateralism. The Left was divided on the issue of Russia. On 1 March 2022, 7 MEPs out of the group's 37 voted against the European Parliament's resolution condemning the Russian invasion of Ukraine, while 10 also abstained in the vote that passed 637–14. Even before the 2022 escalation of the Russo-Ukrainian war, there were tensions in the group, especially with the Irish MEPs Mick Wallace and Clare Daly working to defuse sanctions on Russia placed because of the downing of the Malaysia Airlines Flight 17.

== Member parties ==
MEPs may be full or associate members.

- Full members must accept the constitutional declaration of the group.
- Associate members need not fully do so, but they may sit with the full members.

National parties may be full or associate members.

- Full member parties must accept the constitutional declaration of the group.
- Associate member parties may include parties that do not have MEPs (e.g. French Trotskyist parties that did not elected any MEP in the 2004 election), are from states that are not part of the EU, or do not wish to be full members.

== MEPs ==
=== 10th European Parliament ===
The Left has MEPs in 14 member states. Dark red indicates member states sending multiple MEPs, light red indicates member states sending a single MEP.

Country	National party	European alliance	MEPs
Belgium	Workers' Party of Belgium	PEL (Note: Marc Botenga is also an individual member of PEL.)	1 / 22
Belgium	Independent; Rudi Kennes	Independent	1 / 22
Cyprus	Progressive Party of Working People	PEL observer PEL individual member	1 / 6
Denmark	Red–Green Alliance	ELA	1 / 15
Finland	Left Alliance	ELA	3 / 15
France	La France Insoumise	ELA	9 / 81
Germany	Die Linke	PEL	3 / 96
Germany	Human Environment Animal Protection Party	APEU; PEL individual member	1 / 96
Greece	Syriza	PEL	2 / 21
Greece	Independent; Nikos Pappas	Independent; PEL individual member	1 / 21
Ireland	Sinn Féin	None; PEL individual members	2 / 14
Ireland	Independent; Luke 'Ming' Flanagan	Independent; PEL individual member	1 / 14
Italy	Five Star Movement	None	8 / 76
Italy	Italian Left	ELA	1 / 76
Italy	Independent (elected with AVS); Domenico Lucano	Independent; PEL individual member	1 / 76
Netherlands	Party for the Animals	APEU	1 / 31
Portugal	Left Bloc	ELA	1 / 21
Portugal	Portuguese Communist Party	None	1 / 21
Spain	Podemos	ELA	2 / 61
Spain	Movimiento Sumar	None; PEL individual member	1 / 61
Spain	EH Bildu	ELA observer EFA individual member	1 / 61
Sweden	Left Party	ELA	2 / 21
European Union	Total		45 / 720

=== 9th European Parliament ===
State	National party	Ideology	European alliance	MEPs
Belgium	Workers' Party of Belgium; Partij van de Arbeid van België (PVDA); Parti du Travail de Belgique (PTB)	Communism; Marxism	None	1 / 21
Cyprus	Progressive Party of Working People; Ανορθωτικό Κόμμα Εργαζόμενου Λαού (ΑΚΕΛ)	Communism; Marxism–Leninism	None / PEL (observer)	2 / 6
Czech Republic	Communist Party of Bohemia and Moravia; Komunistická strana Čech a Moravy (KSČM)	Communism	None / PEL (observer)	1 / 21
Denmark	Red–Green Alliance; Enhedslisten – De Rød-Grønne (Ø)	Socialism	PEL	1 / 14
Finland	Left Alliance; Vasemmistoliitto (vas.); Vänsterförbundet	Democratic socialism	None / PEL (observer)	1 / 14
France	La France Insoumise (LFI)	Democratic socialism Left-wing populism	None / PEL (observer)	5 / 79
France	Republican and Socialist Left; Gauche Républicaine et Socialiste (GRS)	Socialism	None / PEL (observer)	1 / 79
Germany	The Left; Die Linke	Democratic socialism Left-wing populism	PEL	5 / 96
Greece	Syriza; Συνασπισμός Ριζοσπαστικής Αριστεράς (ΣΥΡΙΖΑ)	Social democracy	PEL	2 / 21
Greece	New Left; Νέα Αριστερά (NA)	Democratic Socialism	None	2 / 21
Ireland	Independents 4 Change; Neamhspleáigh ar son an Athraithe	Socialism	None	2 / 13
Ireland	Sinn Féin (SF)	Democratic socialism Irish republicanism	None	1 / 13
Ireland	Independent; Luke 'Ming' Flanagan		Independent	1 / 13
Netherlands	Party for the Animals; Partij voor de Dieren (PvdD)	Environmentalism; Soft Euroscepticism	APEU	1 / 29
Portugal	Left Bloc; Bloco de Esquerda (BE)	Democratic socialism Left-wing populism	PEL	2 / 21
Portugal	Portuguese Communist Party; Partido Comunista Português (PCP)	Communism; Marxism–Leninism	None	2 / 21
Spain	Podemos	Democratic socialism Spanish republicanism	None	4 / 59
Spain	United Left; Izquierda Unida (IU)	Communism; Socialism	PEL	1 / 59
Spain	Anticapitalistas	Socialism; Trotskyism	None	1 / 59
Sweden	Left Party; Vänsterpartiet (V)	Socialism; Soft Euroscepticism	None	1 / 21
European Union	Total			37 / 705

The initial member parties for the 9th European Parliament was determined at the first meeting on 29 May 2019.

=== 8th European Parliament ===
Country	National party		European alliance	MEPs
Cyprus	Progressive Party of Working People		PEL (observer)	2 / 6
Czech Republic	Communist Party of Bohemia and Moravia		PEL (observer)	3 / 21
Denmark	People's Movement against the EU		EUD	1 / 13
Finland	Left Alliance		PEL/NTP	1 / 13
France	Left Front	French Communist Party	PEL	2 / 74
France	Left Front	Left Party		1 / 74
France	Left Front	La France Insoumise	NTP	1 / 74
France	Alliance of the Overseas	Communist Party of Réunion		1 / 74
Germany	The Left		PEL	7 / 96
Germany	Stefan Eck (independent)			1 / 96
Greece	Syriza (Coalition of the Radical Left)		PEL	3 / 21
Greece	Popular Unity			1 / 21
Greece	Kostas Chrysogonos (independent)			1 / 21
Greece	MeRA25			1 / 21
Ireland	Sinn Féin			3 / 11
Ireland	Luke 'Ming' Flanagan (independent)			1 / 11
Italy	The Left	Italian Left	PEL (observer)	1 / 73
Italy	The Left	Communist Refoundation Party	PEL	1 / 73
Italy	Barbara Spinelli (independent)			1 / 73
Netherlands	Socialist Party			2 / 26
Netherlands	Party for the Animals (Partij voor de Dieren)		Euro Animal 7	1 / 26
Portugal	Left Bloc		PEL/NTP	1 / 21
Portugal	Unitary Democratic Coalition	Portuguese Communist Party		3 / 21
Spain	Plural Left	United Left	PEL	4 / 54
Spain	Plural Left	Anova-Nationalist Brotherhood		1 / 54
Spain	Podemos (We Can)		NTP	5 / 54
Spain	The Peoples Decide (Los Pueblos Deciden)			1 / 54
Sweden	Left Party		NTP	1 / 20
United Kingdom	Sinn Féin			1 / 73

=== 7th European Parliament ===
Country	National party		European alliance	MEPs
Cyprus	Progressive Party of Working People		PEL (observer)	2 / 6
Czech Republic	Communist Party of Bohemia and Moravia		PEL (observer)	4 / 22
Denmark	People's Movement against the EU		EUD	1 / 13
France	Left Front	French Communist Party	PEL	2 / 72
France	Left Front	Left Party	PEL	1 / 72
France	Left Front	Communist Party of Réunion		1 / 72
France	Left Front	Independent		1 / 72
Germany	The Left		PEL	8 / 99
Greece	Communist Party of Greece			2 / 22
Greece	Coalition of the Radical Left (SYRIZA)			1 / 22
Ireland	Socialist Party			1 / 12
Latvia	Harmony Centre	Socialist Party		1 / 8
Netherlands	Socialist Party			2 / 25
Portugal	Left Bloc		PEL	2 / 22
Portugal	Democratic Unity Coalition	Portuguese Communist Party		2 / 22
Spain	United Left	Communist Party of Spain	PEL	1 / 54
Sweden	Left Party			1 / 20
United Kingdom	Sinn Féin (Contests elections in Northern Ireland only)			1 / 3

=== 6th European Parliament ===
Country	National party	European alliance	MEPs
Cyprus	Progressive Party of Working People	PEL (observer)	2 / 6
Czech Republic	Communist Party of Bohemia and Moravia	PEL (observer)	6 / 22
Denmark	People's Movement against the EU	EUD	1 / 14
Finland	Left Alliance		1 / 13
France	French Communist Party	PEL	3 / 74
Germany	The Left	PEL	6 / 99
Greece	Communist Party of Greece		3 / 21
Greece	Synaspismos	PEL	1 / 21
Ireland	Sinn Féin		1 / 13
Italy	Communist Refoundation Party	PEL	5 / 73
Italy	Party of Italian Communists	PEL (observer)	2 / 73
Netherlands	Socialist Party		2 / 26
Portugal	Portuguese Communist Party		2 / 21
Portugal	Left Bloc		1 / 21
Spain	United Left	PEL	1 / 54
Sweden	Left Party		2 / 20
United Kingdom	Sinn Féin (Contests elections in Northern Ireland only)		1 / 73

=== 5th European Parliament ===
Country	National party	European alliance	MEPs

=== 4th European Parliament ===
Country	National party	European alliance	MEPs

== Organization ==
=== Presidents ===
Chairperson	Took office	Left office	Country (Constituency)	Party
Alonso Puerta	1995	1999	Spain	United Left
Francis Wurtz	1999	2009	France (Île-de-France)	Communist Party
Lothar Bisky	2009	2012	Germany	The Left
Gabi Zimmer	2012	2019	Germany	The Left
Manon Aubry*	2019	present	France	La France Insoumise
Martin Schirdewan*	2019	present	Germany	The Left

- Since 2019, The Left group has had two co-chairpeople.

== European Parliament results ==
Election year	No. of overall seats won	+/–
1994	34 / 567	
1999	42 / 626	8 ▲
2004	41 / 732	1 ▼
2009	35 / 766	6 ▼
2014	52 / 751	17 ▲
2019	41 / 751	11 ▼
2024	46 / 720	6 ▲

== See also ==
- Eurocommunism
- European Anti-Capitalist Left (EACL)
- European Communist Action (ECA)
- Initiative of Communist and Workers' Parties (INITIATIVE)
- List of communist parties represented in European Parliament
- Marxist humanism
- Western Marxism
