= Left Alliance (Finland) =

Finnish political party

Left Alliance Vasemmistoliitto (Finnish) Vänsterförbundet (Swedish)
- Abbreviation: Finnish: Vas; Swedish: VF
- Chairperson: Minja Koskela
- Secretary: Anna Mäkipää
- Parliamentary group leader: Aino-Kaisa Pekonen
- First deputy chair: Laura Meriluoto
- Chair of the party council: Mitja Tapio
- Founder: Claes Andersson
- Founded: 29 April 1990
- Merger of: SKDL; SKP; Democratic Alternative; Socialist Workers' Party
- Headquarters: Lintulahdenkatu 10, 00500 Helsinki
- Newspaper: Kansan Uutiset
- Think tank: Vasemmistofoorumi
- Student wing: Vasemmisto-opiskelijat
- Youth wing: Left Youth (unofficially)
- Women's wing: Vasemmistonaiset
- Children's wing: Pinskut
- Membership (2020): ▲11,500
- Ideology: Democratic socialism; Eco-socialism
- Political position: Left-wing
- European affiliation: European Left Alliance for the People and the Planet; Now the People !
- European Parliament group: The Left in the European Parliament
- Nordic affiliation: Nordic Green Left Alliance
- Colours: Pink
- Eduskunta: 11 / 200
- European Parliament: 3 / 15
- Municipalities: 536 / 8,586
- County seats: 117 / 1,379

Website
- vasemmisto.fi

The Left Alliance (Note: Finnish: Vasemmistoliitto [ˈʋɑsemːistoˌliːtːo], Vas; Swedish: Vänsterförbundet, VF) is a left-wing political party in Finland.

The Left Alliance was founded in 1990 as the chief successor of the left-wing Finnish People's Democratic League (SKDL). Although not as electorally successful as the SKDL, it has achieved some success, typically receiving around eight to ten percent of the vote in parliamentary elections. It has participated in five cabinets, most recently in the Marin Cabinet from 2019 to 2023. It is socialist, specifically democratically socialist, and it supports the principles of eco-socialism.

The Left Alliance is a member of the Nordic Green Left Alliance. The party's newspaper is the monthly Kansan Uutiset. It had two ministerial positions in the Marin cabinet, Li Andersson as Minister of Education and Hanna Sarkkinen as Minister of Social Affairs and Health. It is also a part of the European Left Alliance for the People and the Planet, a European political party that supports an alternative to capitalism.

== History ==
The Left Alliance was founded by the Finnish People's Democratic League (SKDL), the majority of members of the waning Communist Party of Finland (SKP) and the Finnish Women's Democratic League (SNDL). It was later joined by the communist Democratic Alternative. The founding meeting was held in April 1990 in Helsinki, following the publishing of the April Declaration, which stated the party's ideals.

The party's history has been characterised via internal disputes and bickering, as it was formed by people with very different views on society. There have been several defections from the Left Alliance to the Social Democratic Party (SDP) and the Communist Party of Finland. In 2005, the party's former secretary and Central Organisation of Finnish Trade Unions's assistant head Matti Viialainen formed a group to promote a merger between the two largest Finnish left-wing political parties, the Left Alliance and the SDP. This caused an outrage within the Left Alliance, and Viialainen was condemned for wanting to break up the party. Viialainen subsequently left the party and ran for parliament on the SDP's ticket in 2007.

In 2006, the party's leader Suvi-Anne Siimes announced her resignation from the post and the party as a result of long-standing feuds with the leftist section of the party. On 13 May 2006, Martti Korhonen was elected as the new party leader. He was followed by Paavo Arhinmäki in June 2009, following the party's bad performance in the 2009 EU parliamentary election, in which the party lost its only seat.

In the 2011 election, the party won 14 seats and became a partner in the six-party "rainbow" cabinet. The decision to join the government created a split in the party, leading to the expulsion of two MPs from the parliamentary group. In 2014, the Left Alliance left the cabinet over a dispute on a package of spending cuts and tax hikes. In 2014 European Parliament election, the party regained their lost seat.

In the 2015 parliamentary election, the party received 211,615 votes, 7.1% of the total, and won 12 seats in the parliament. In April 2016, Arhinmäki announced that he wouldn't seek another term as the party leader. On 11 June 2016, Arhinmäki was succeeded by Li Andersson. Under the leadership of Andersson, the party gained support in the 2017 municipal elections and the 2019 parliamentary election, in the latter, the party increased its representation in the parliament for the first time since 1995.

In the 2023 Finnish parliamentary election, the Left Alliance suffered its worst defeat ever, losing five seats, reducing the party to 11 MPs. However, in the next year's European Parliament elections, the Left Alliance finished a surprising second, ahead of the Social Democrats, and elected three MEPs, including party leader Li Andersson. Prior to the election, polls had shown the party to be in fourth place. Andersson herself received the most votes of any Finnish politician in European election history.

On 19 October 2024, Andersson was succeeded as party leader by Minja Koskela. In the 2025 Finnish county election, the Left Alliance came in third nationwide. In the municipal election held on the same day, the party placed fourth. It had higher support in both elections when compared to the results of the previous corresponding elections, and notably surpassed the Finns Party in support in both elections. Yle reported that the results may signify an ideological shift to the left in Finland.

== Ideology and policies ==
The Left Alliance is commonly described as a left-wing party, sometimes described as far-left.

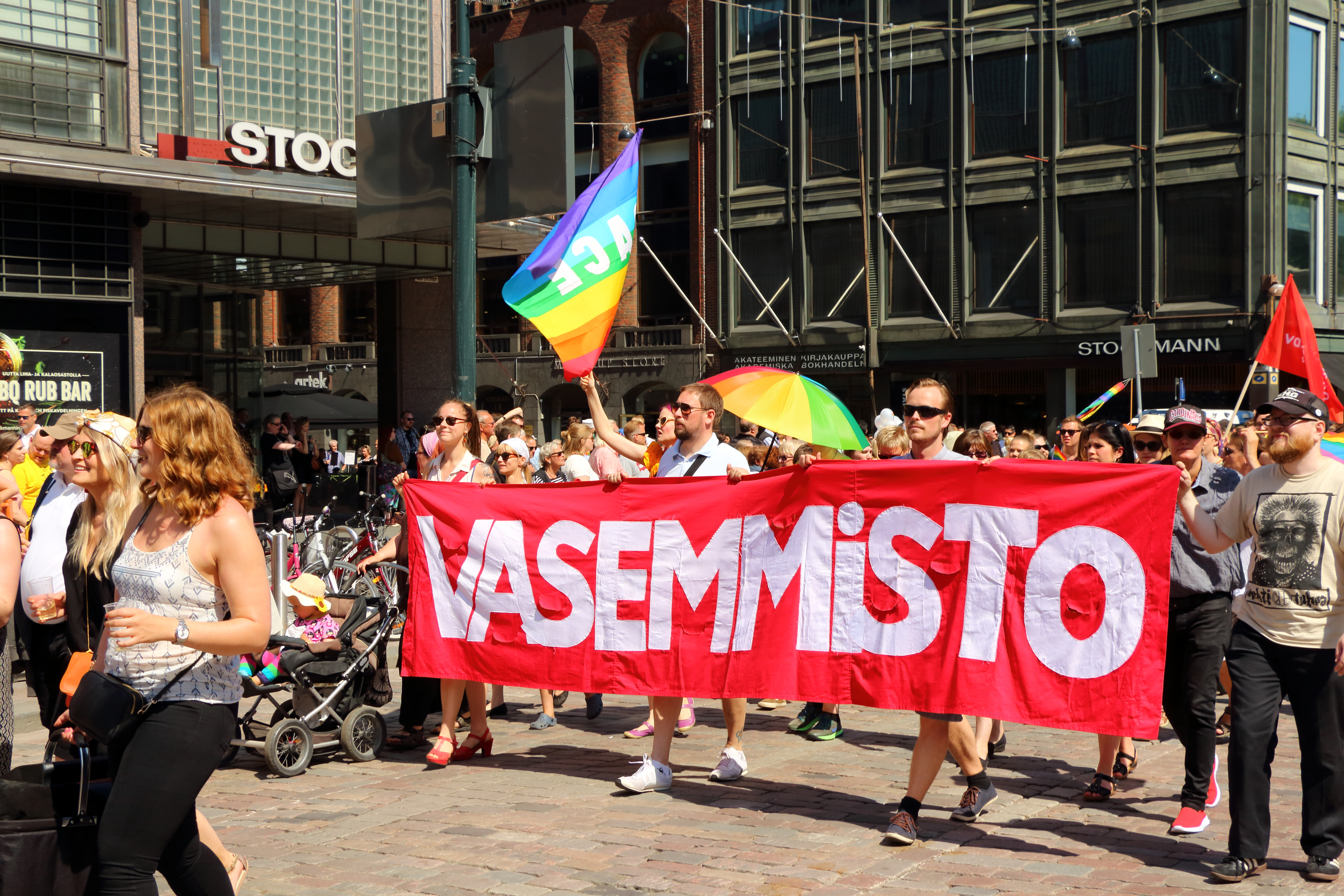
Members of the Left Alliance at Helsinki Pride in 2016

According to the Left Alliance's party programme, adopted by the 5th Party Congress on 16 June 2007, the fundamental values of the Left Alliance are equality, freedom, sustainable development, and democracy. The party believes that globally, democracy must be strengthened, and that democracy should be stronger than the power of capital, challenging global capitalism. Important values also include global solidarity, stopping political polarisation in Finland, freedom and the right to work, and environmentalism. The party is for equality in all its forms and identifies strongly as feminist, anti-racist and is in support of economic democracy. The party has been defined from the outside as social democratic. The party supports introducing a universal basic income and prioritizes supporting the weakest members of society.

The Left Alliance wants the European Union to be more socially just. The party endorses the European Green Deal via changing the European Central Bank's financial sector's quantitative easing stimulus into a green stimulus to mitigate global warming and create green-collar jobs.

The party has traditionally been one of the staunch opponents of a Finnish NATO membership accession. After Finland considered an accession bid to NATO in May 2022, the party was in doubt whether to officially support an eventual NATO membership but assured that it would stay in the Marin cabinet in the case it made one. During its annual party congress in June 2022, the Left Alliance adapted its party programme and now only demands an eventual NATO membership to remain defensive, with no permanent NATO military bases or nuclear weapons within the country. It also demanded the Kurdistan Workers' Party (PKK) to be taken off the European Union's list of terrorist organisations. The party wants Finland to recognise Palestine and stop Finland's arms trade with Israel.

== Organization ==
=== Logos ===
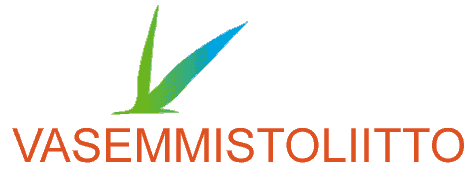
Logo of the Left Alliance in 1996.

Former logo of the Left Alliance.

Logo of the Left Alliance from 2010–2018.

Logo of the Left Alliance since 2018.

=== Chairpersons ===
- Claes Andersson (1990–1998)
- Suvi-Anne Siimes (1998–2006)
- Martti Korhonen (2006–2009)
- Paavo Arhinmäki (2009–2016)
- Li Andersson (2016–2024)
- Minja Koskela (2024–present)

== Election results ==
=== Parliamentary elections ===
Election	Votes	%	Seats	+/-	Government
1991	274,639	10.08	19 / 200	New	Opposition
1995	310,340	11.16	22 / 200	▲3	Coalition
1999	291,675	10.88	20 / 200	▼2	Coalition
2003	277,152	9.93	19 / 200	▼1	Opposition
2007	244,296	8.82	17 / 200	▼2	Opposition
2011	238,437	8.15	14 / 200	▼3	Coalition (2011–2014)
2011	238,437	8.15	14 / 200	▼3	Opposition (2014–2015)
2015	211,702	7.13	12 / 200	▼2	Opposition
2019	251,808	8.20	16 / 200	▲4	Coalition
2023	218,340	7.06	11 / 200	▼5	Opposition

=== Municipal elections ===
Election	Councillors	Votes	%
1992	1,319	310,757	11.67
1996	1,128	246,597	10.37
2000	1,027	219,671	9.88
2004	987	228,358	9.56
2008	833	224,170	8.78
2012	640	199,312	8.0
2017	658	226,626	8.8
2021	508	194,385	7.9
2025	536	224,005	9.3

=== European Parliament ===
Election	Votes	%	Seats	+/–	EP Group
1996	236,490	10.51 (#4)	2 / 16	New	The Left
1999	112,757	9.08 (#5)	1 / 16	▼1	The Left
2004	151,291	9.13 (#5)	1 / 14	0	The Left
2009	98,690	5.93 (#7)	0 / 13	▼1	–
2014	160,818	9.32 (#6)	1 / 13	▲1	The Left
2019	125,749	6.89 (#6)	1 / 13	0	The Left
2024	316,859	17.32 (#2)	3 / 15	▲2	The Left

=== Presidential elections ===
Election	Candidate	1st round		2nd round		Result
Election	Candidate	Votes	%	Votes	%	Result
1994	Claes Andersson	122,820	3.8 (#6)			Lost
2000	None					Lost
2006	Supported Tarja Halonen	1,397,030	46,31 (#1)	1,630,980	51,79 (#1)	Won
2012	Paavo Arhinmäki	167,359	5.5 (#6)			Lost
2018	Merja Kyllönen	89,977	3.0 (#7)			Lost
2024	Li Andersson	158,328	4.88 (#5)			Lost

=== Elected members of parliament ===
The following politicians were elected to the Finnish Parliament in the April 2023 parliamentary election.

- Li Andersson
- Anna Kontula
- Mai Kivelä
- Aino-Kaisa Pekonen
- Hanna Sarkkinen
- Veronika Honkasalo
- Jussi Saramo
- Merja Kyllönen
- Timo Furuholm
- Minja Koskela
- Laura Meriluoto
