= Feminist Party (Finland) =

Feminist Party Feministinen puolue (Finnish) Feministiska partiet (Swedish)
- Abbreviation: FP
- Chairperson: Lauri Alhojärvi
- Founded: 2016
- Ideology: Feminism; Anti-racism
- Political position: Left-wing

Website
- www.feministinenpuolue.fi

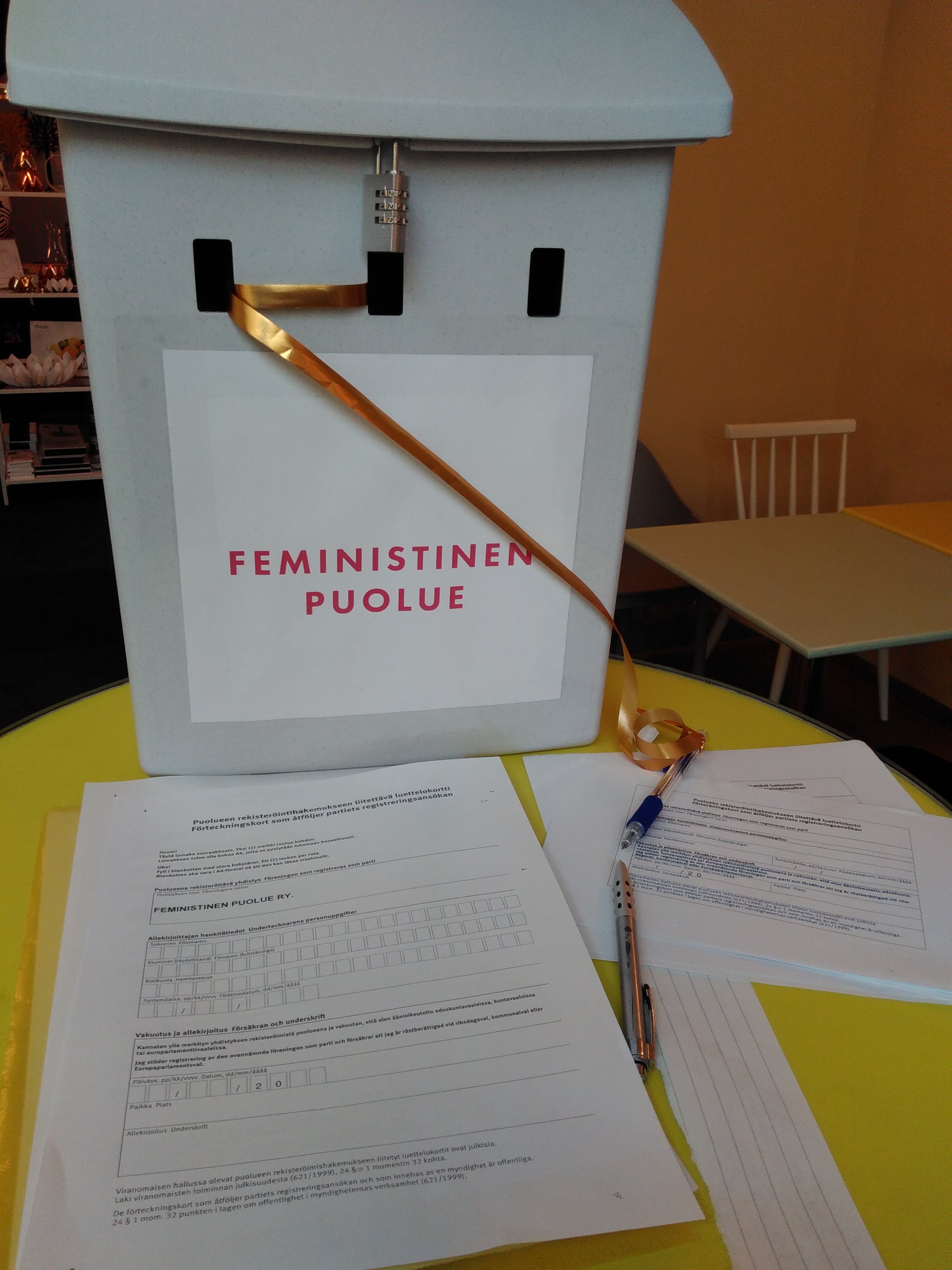
Feminist Party collecting supporter cards in 2016

The Feminist Party (Finnish: Feministinen puolue, Swedish: Feministiska partiet) is a Finnish feminist political party. It was founded in June 2016, and registered as a political party in January 2017. It calls gender equality, human rights, and human security the primary pillars of its politics.

The party had 40 candidates in nine municipalities in the 2017 Finnish municipal elections. Party chair Katju Aro was elected to the City Council of Helsinki. The party lost its representation in municipal councils after the 2021 municipal election. The party was de-registered in 2023 after failing to win seats in two consecutive parliamentary elections.

== Elections results ==
=== Parliament of Finland ===
Election	Votes	%	Seats	+/–	Government
2019	6,662	0.22	0 / 200	New	Extra-parliamentary
2023	1,114	0.04	0 / 200	0	Extra-parliamentary

=== Municipal elections ===
Year	Councillors	Votes	
2017	1	6,856	0,3%
2021	0	4,036	0,2%

=== European Parliament ===
Year	Councillors	Votes		Ref.
2019	0	4,442	0,2%	

== See also ==
- Feminist Initiative (Sweden)
- Feminist Initiative (Norway)
