= Li Andersson =

Finnish politician (born 1987)

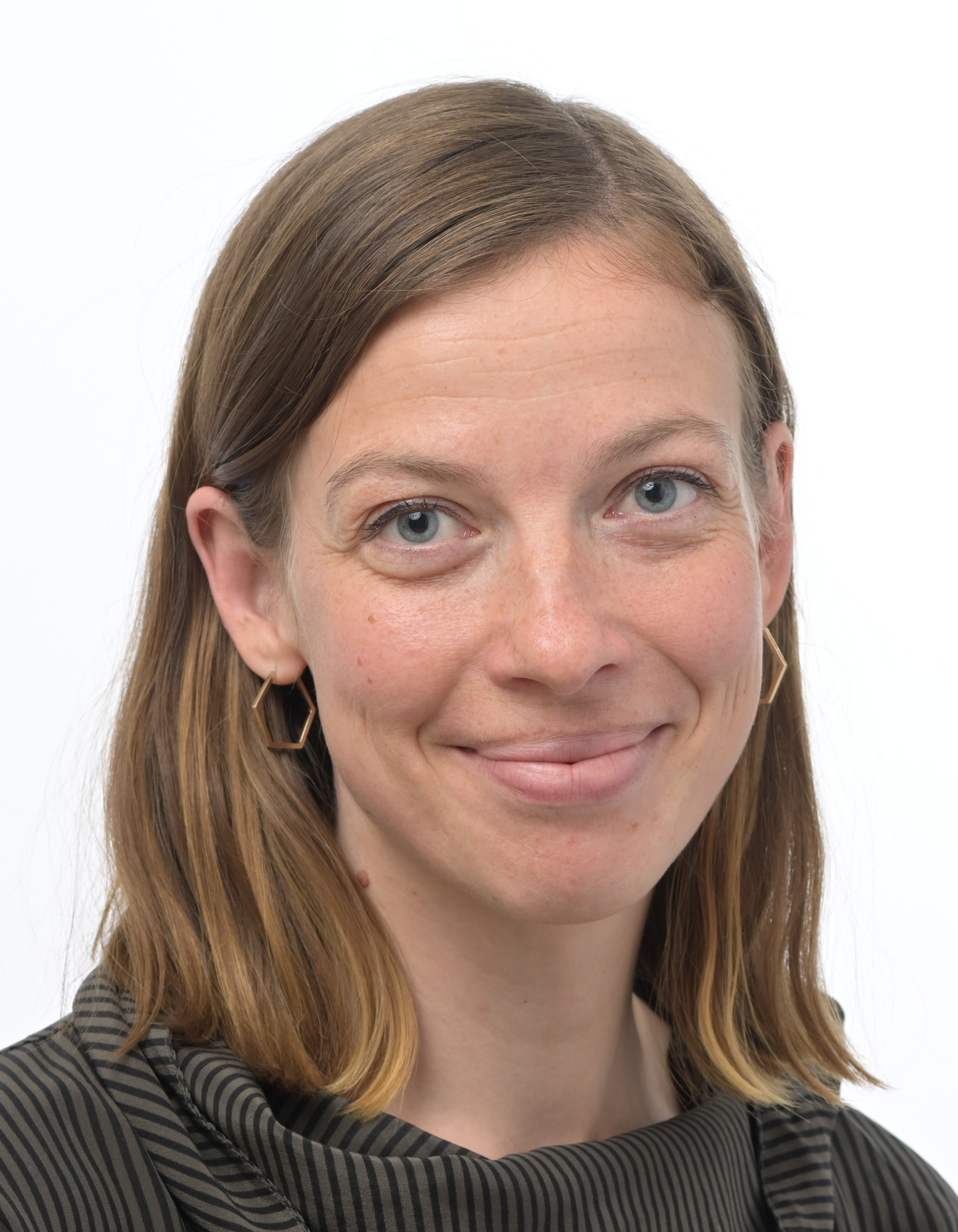
- Official portrait, 2024

Minister of Education
- In office 29 June 2021 – 20 June 2023
- Prime Minister: Sanna Marin
- Preceded by: Jussi Saramo
- Succeeded by: Anna-Maja Henriksson
- In office 6 June 2019 – 17 December 2020
- Prime Minister: Antti Rinne; Sanna Marin
- Preceded by: Sanni Grahn-Laasonen
- Succeeded by: Jussi Saramo

Leader of the Left Alliance
- In office 11 June 2016 – 19 October 2024
- Preceded by: Paavo Arhinmäki
- Succeeded by: Minja Koskela

Member of the Finnish Parliament
- In office 22 April 2015 – 15 July 2024
- Constituency: Varsinais-Suomi

Member of the European Parliament for Finland
- Incumbent
- Assumed office 16 July 2024

Personal details
- Born: Li Sigrid Andersson; 13 May 1987 (age 39) Turku, Southwest Finland, Finland
- Party: Left Alliance
- Other political affiliations: European Left Alliance (EU)
- Spouse: Juha Pursiainen
- Children: 1
- Education: Åbo Akademi University (BSS)
- Website: https://liandersson.fi/

Li Sigrid Andersson (born 13 May 1987) is a Finland-Swedish politician who served as Minister of Education from 2019 to 2023. A former leader of the Left Alliance, she was a Member of Parliament from 2015 to 2024. As of 2024, she is a Member of European Parliament. She has also been a city councillor in Turku and chair of the Left Alliance's youth wing, Left Youth.

== Education ==
Andersson graduated from Åbo Akademi University in 2010 with a Bachelor of Social Science in international law, specializing in international human rights law and refugee law, with an academic minor in Russian language and culture.

== Political career ==
In the parliamentary elections of 2015 Andersson was elected with the highest number of personal votes in Varsinais-Suomi (with 17 seats). Candidates in the district included the chairmen of the National Coalition Party and the Green League. In the 2017 municipal elections, she got the most votes of any candidate outside of Helsinki placing sixth, nationally.

In February 2016, Andersson announced running for Left Alliance chair. On 6 June 2016, she received 3,913 (61.85%) votes in an unofficial poll between the party members, after which the other candidates withdrew from the running, leaving her the only remaining candidate. The decision was confirmed on 11 June 2016 at the Left Alliance party meeting in Oulu.

After the 2019 parliamentary election, in which the Left Alliance gained four seats for a total of 16 (out of 200) the party joined the SDP-led Rinne Cabinet. Andersson became Minister of Education. She temporarily left her ministerial post in December 2020 to go on maternity leave.

In September 2023, Andersson announced her candidacy for the 2024 Finnish presidential election. In the election, she received 4.88% of the total vote count and failed to advance to the second round of voting.

On 5 March 2024, Andersson announced that she will relinquish Left Alliance leadership to run as a candidate in the 2024 European parliamentary elections.

On 9 June 2024, in the 2024 European Parliament election, Andersson received more votes (247,604) than any other candidate had ever received in a European Parliament election in Finland. In July 2024, she was nominated and elected to chair the Committee on Employment and Social Affairs, EMPL.

== Views ==
In terms of foreign policy, Andersson advocates for Finland to follow a Nordic policy line within NATO, promoting deeper cooperation within the alliance while adhering to principles such as the rejection of permanent NATO military bases, installations and nuclear weapons on Finland's soil. She criticized the Sipilä Cabinet's approach to internal devaluation, which she says has resulted in declining wages and challenges for low-income earners.

== Personal life ==
Andersson was born in Turku.

She cohabits with former ice-hockey player Juha Pursiainen in Turku. She gave birth to their first child, a daughter, in January 2021. Andersson belongs to the Swedish-speaking Finnish national minority.

== Honors ==
- Order of the White Rose of Finland (Finland, 2022)

== Electoral history ==
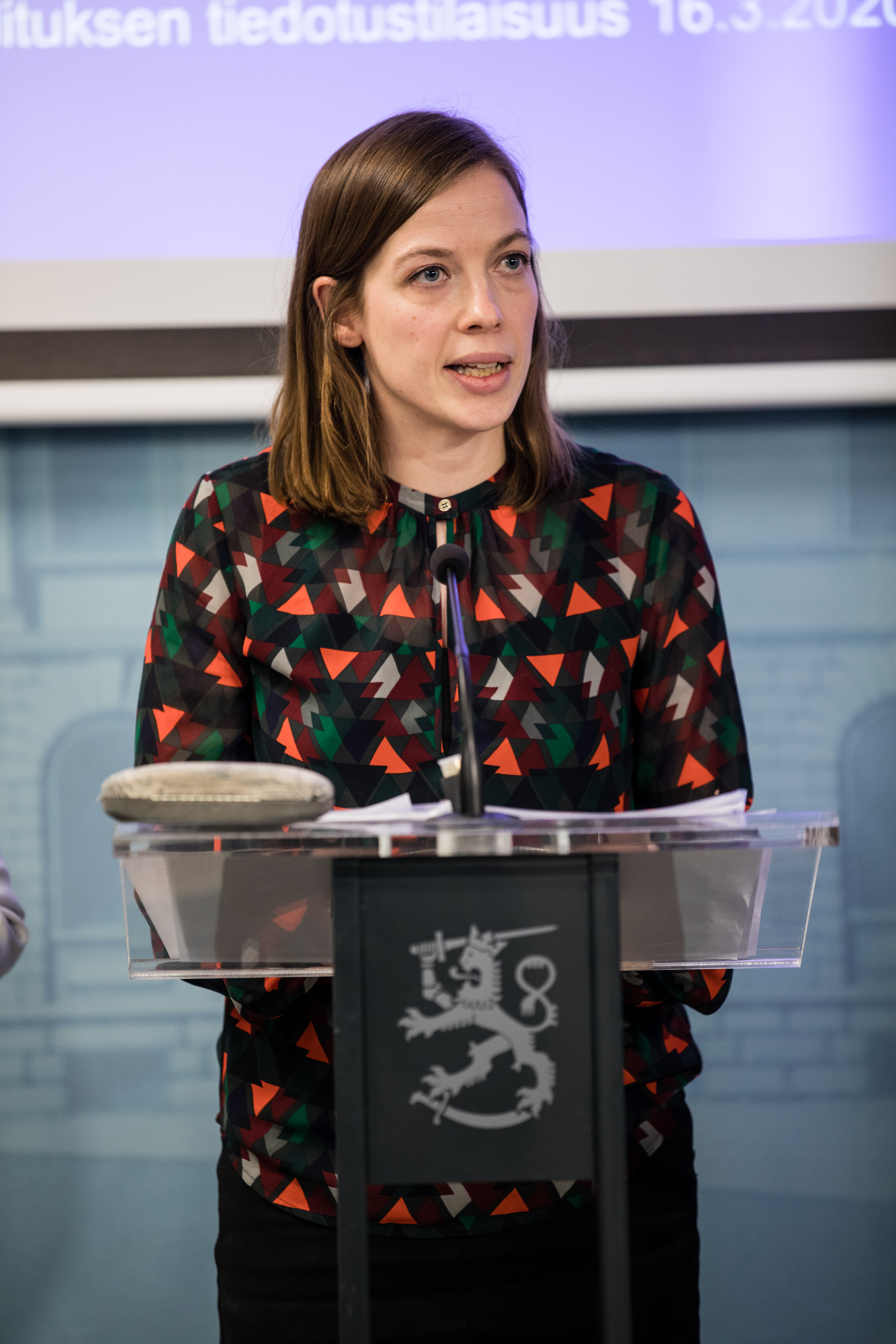
Li Andersson at the government's press conference in 2020

=== Municipal elections ===
Year	Municipality	Votes	Result
2008	Turku	175	Not elected
2012	Turku	2,422	Elected
2017	Turku	6,415	Elected

=== Parliamentary elections ===
Year	Constituency	Votes	Result
2011	Varsinais-Suomi	2,170	Not elected
2015	Varsinais-Suomi	15,071	Elected
2019	Varsinais-Suomi	24,404	Elected

=== European Parliament elections ===
Year	Constituency	Votes	Result
2014	Finland	47,599	Not elected
2024	Finland	247,604	Elected

Political offices
Preceded by Sanni Grahn-Laasonen	Minister of Education; 2019–2020	Succeeded by Jussi Saramo
Preceded by Jussi Saramo	Minister of Education; 2021–2023	Succeeded by Anna-Maja Henriksson
