= Jussi Saramo =

Finnish politician

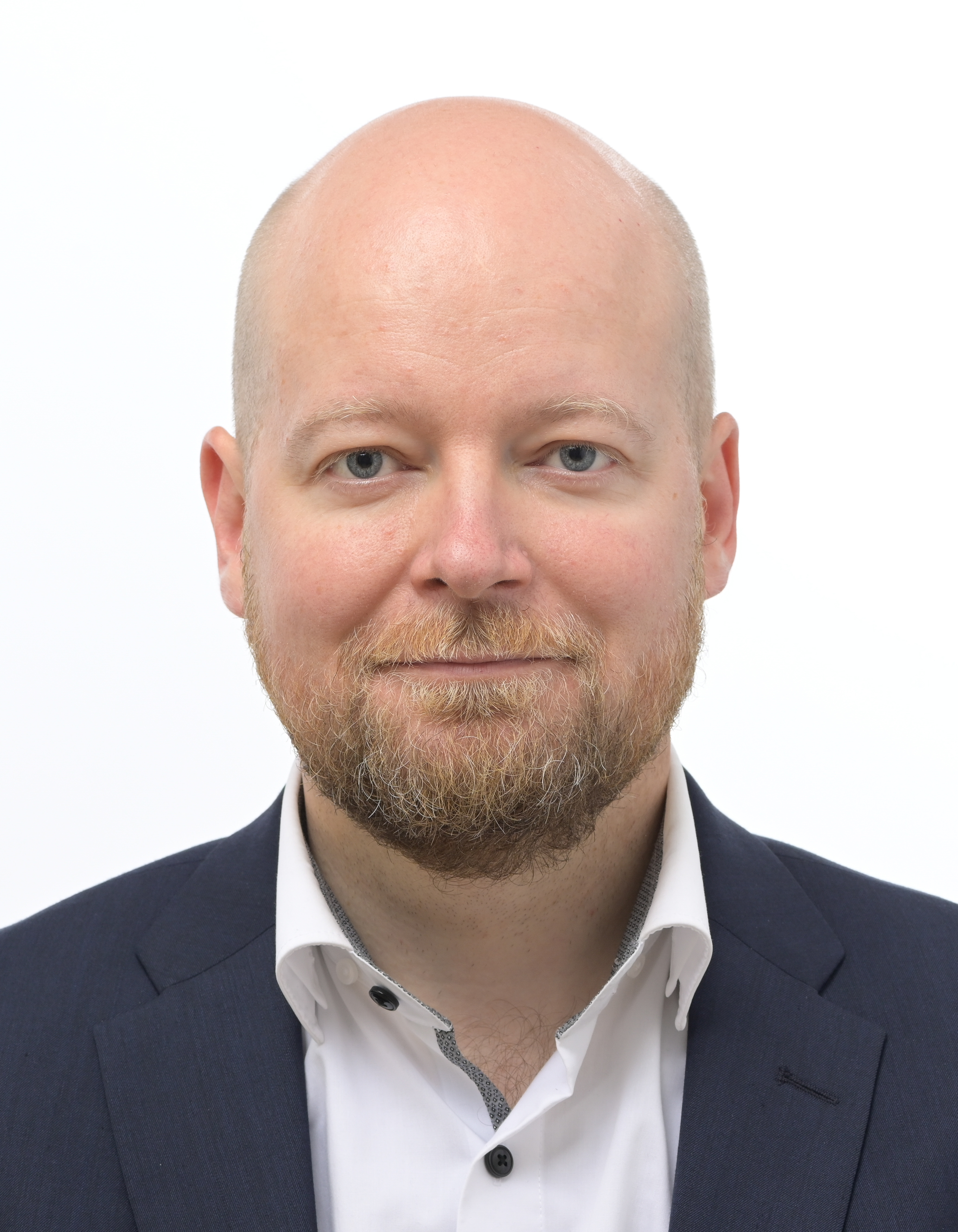
- Saramo in 2024

Minister of Education
- In office 17 December 2020 – 29 June 2021
- Prime Minister: Sanna Marin
- Preceded by: Li Andersson
- Succeeded by: Li Andersson

Member of the Finnish Parliament
- In office 17 April 2019 – 16 July 2024
- Constituency: Uusimaa

Member of the European Parliament
- Incumbent
- Assumed office 16 July 2024
- Constituency: Finland

Personal details
- Born: Jussi Antero Saramo; 9 July 1979 (age 46) Porvoon maalaiskunta, Uusimaa, Finland
- Party: Left Alliance
- Education: Vocational Qualification In Business Information Technology (Edupoli)

Jussi Antero Saramo (born 9 July 1979 in Porvoon maalaiskunta) is a Finnish politician who serves in the Parliament of Finland for the Left Alliance at the Uusimaa constituency. He was elected to office in the 2019 Finnish parliamentary election, and served as Minister of Education while party leader Li Andersson was on maternity leave. Prior to his election to parliament, Saramo served as an executive on the board of multiple Finnish organisations including Veikkaus and Keva.
