= 2017 Finnish municipal elections =

- 9 April 2017

All 295 municipal councils
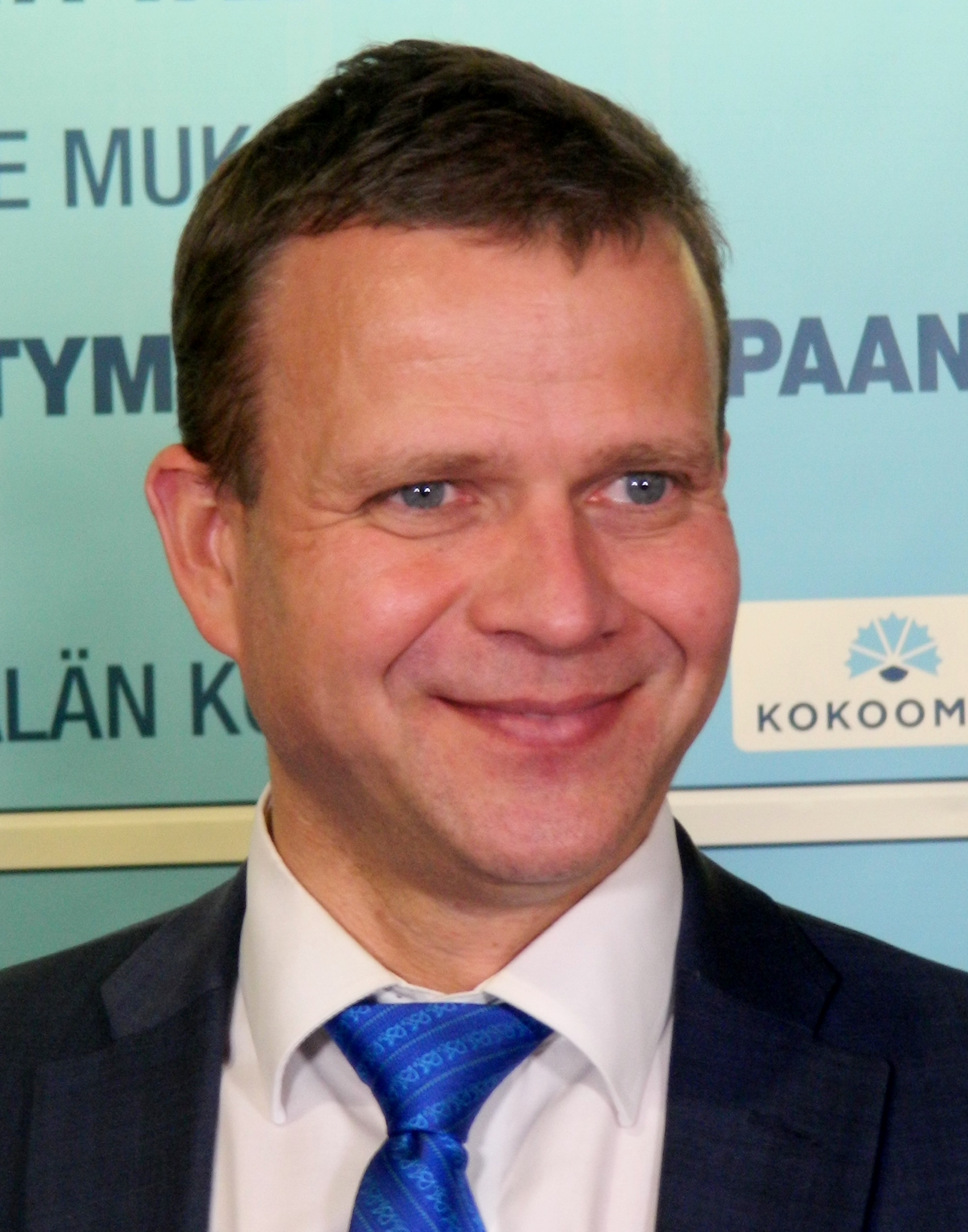

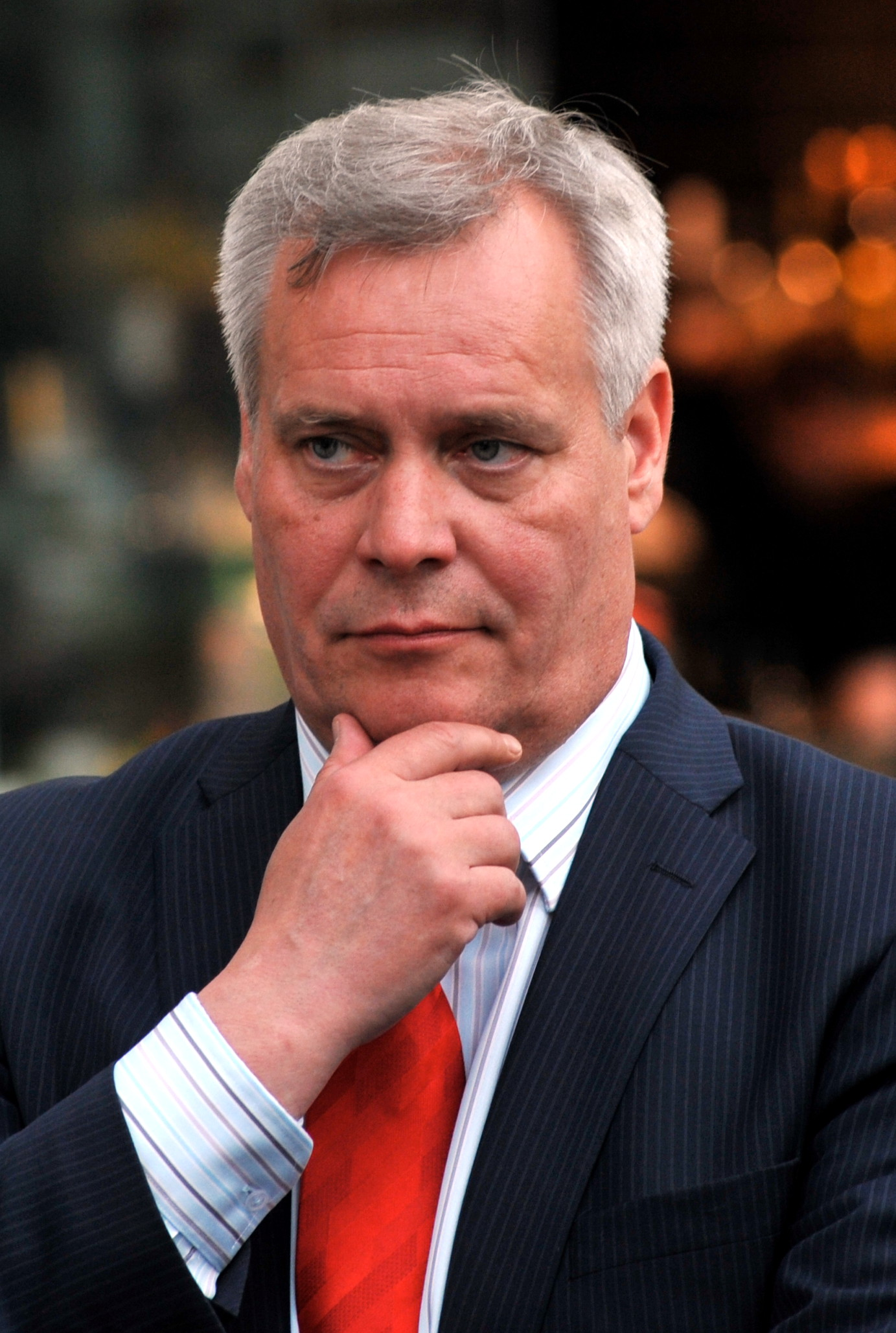

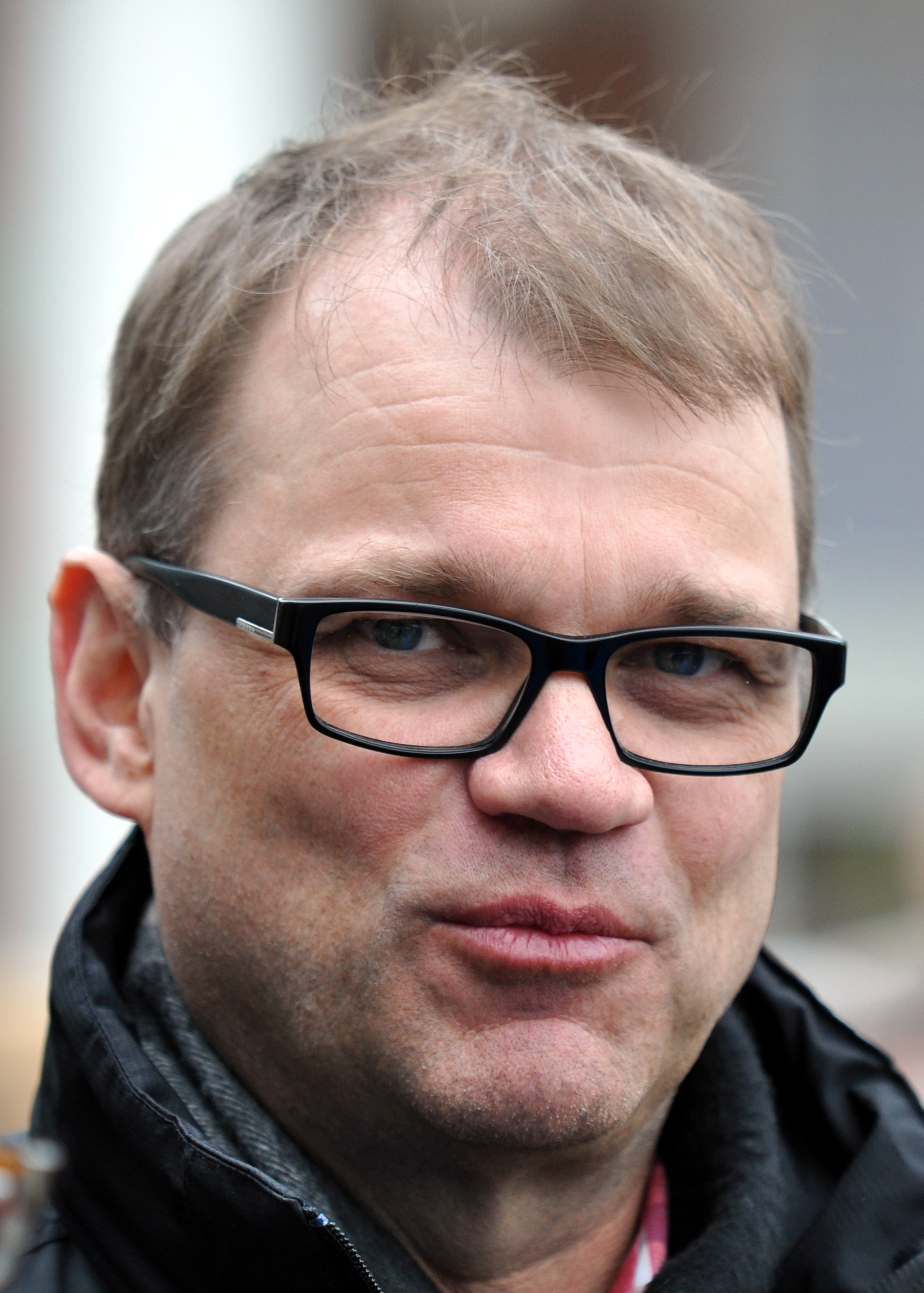

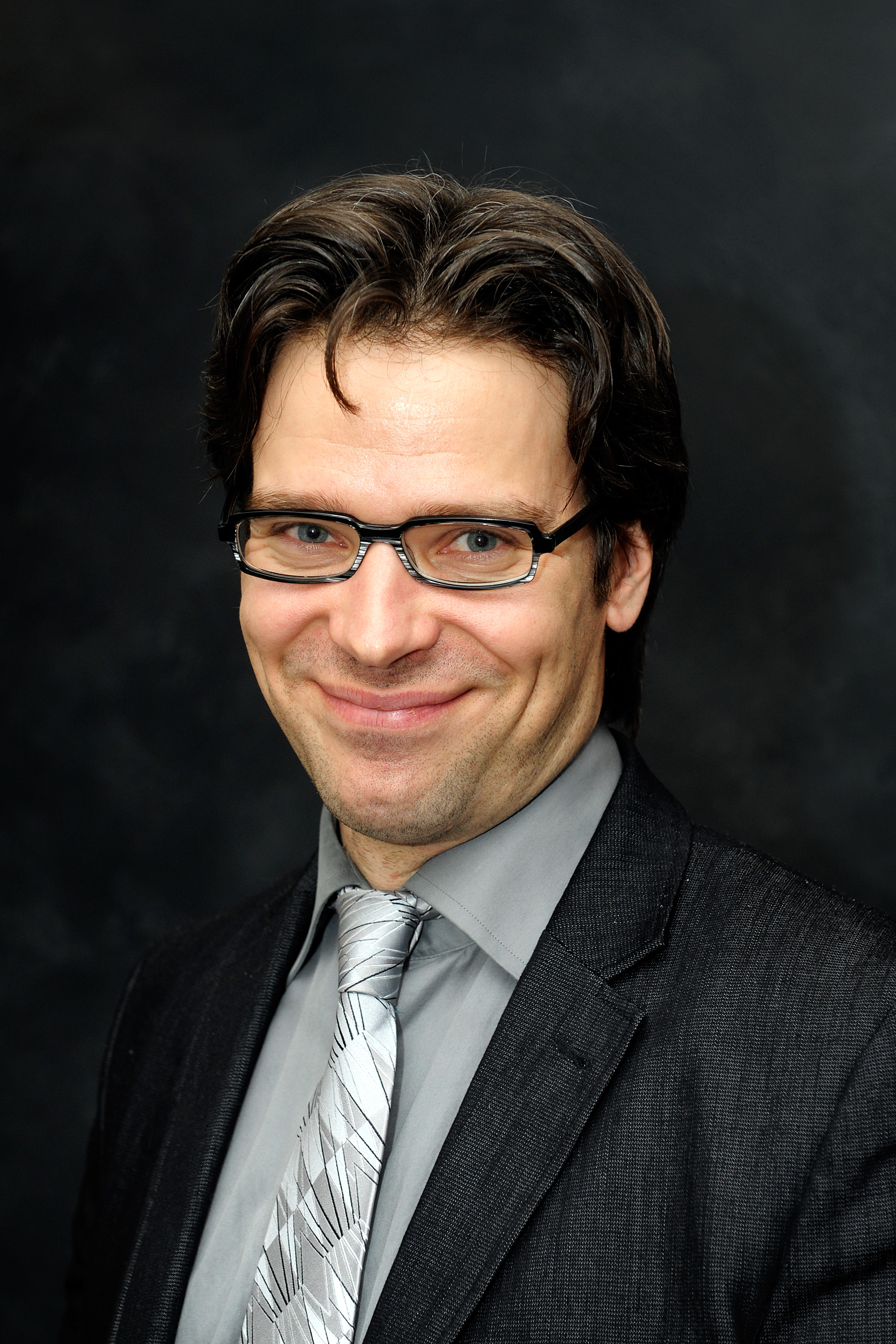

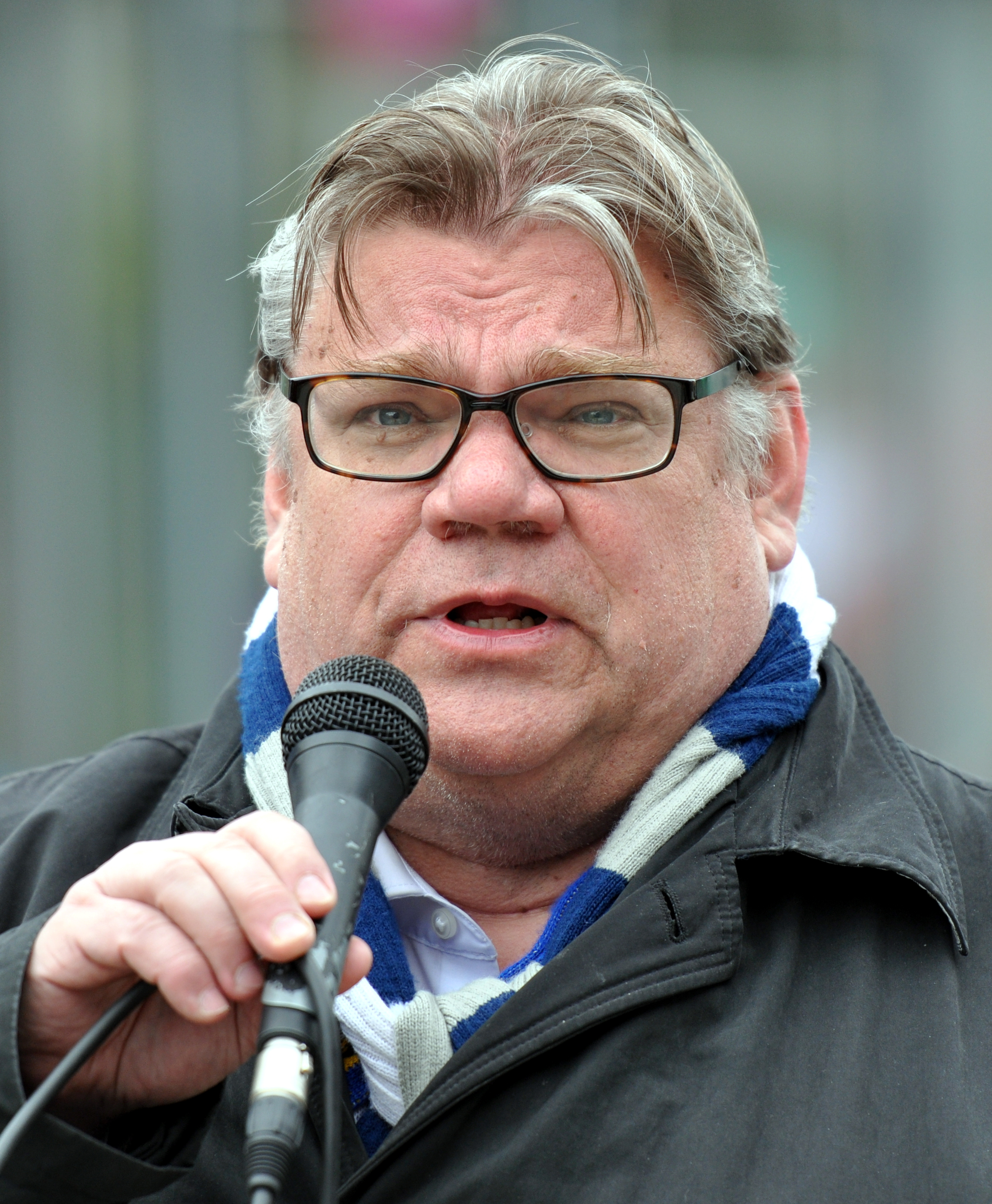

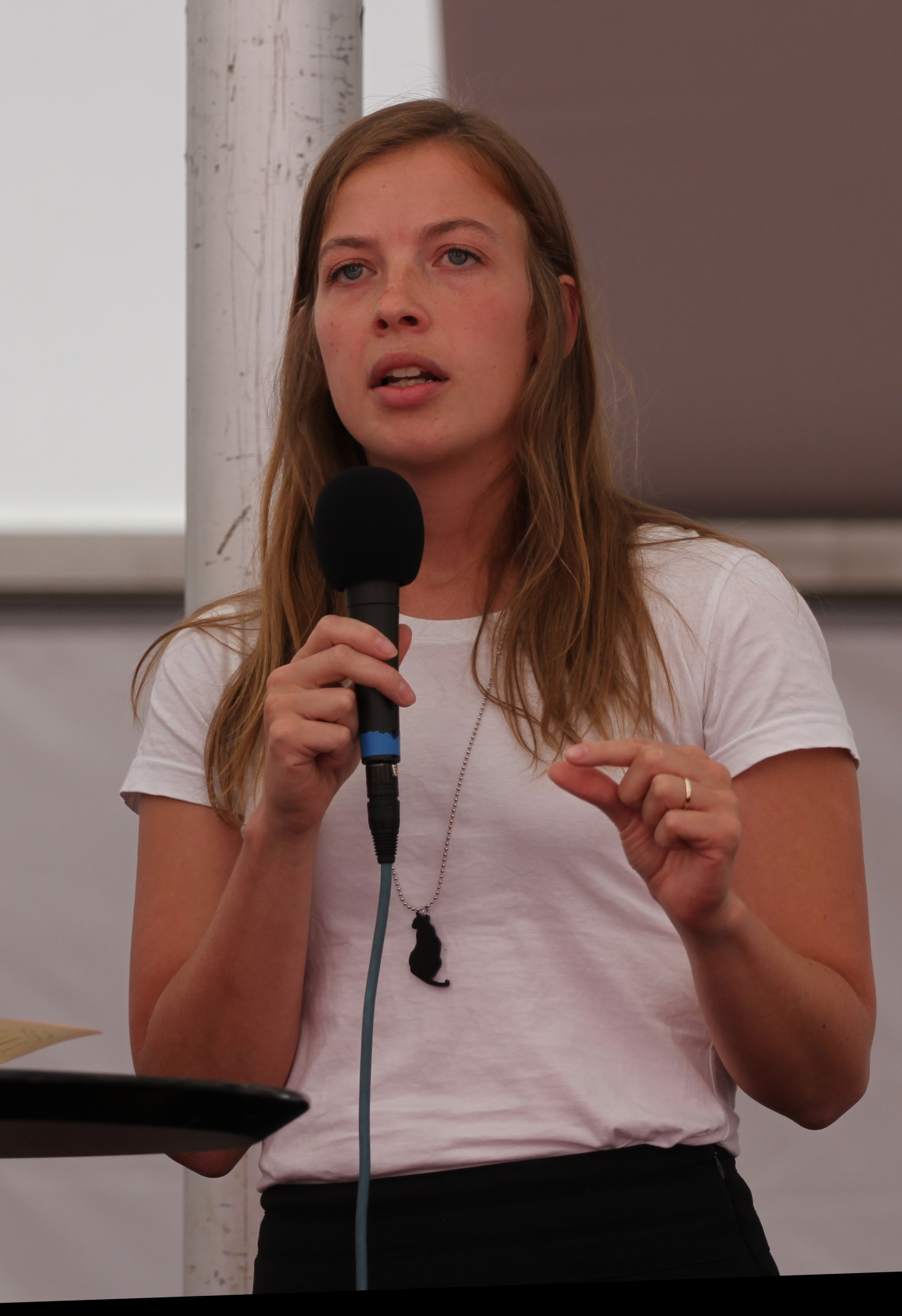

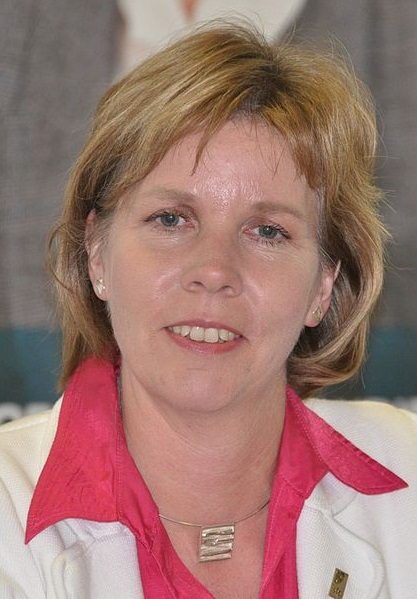

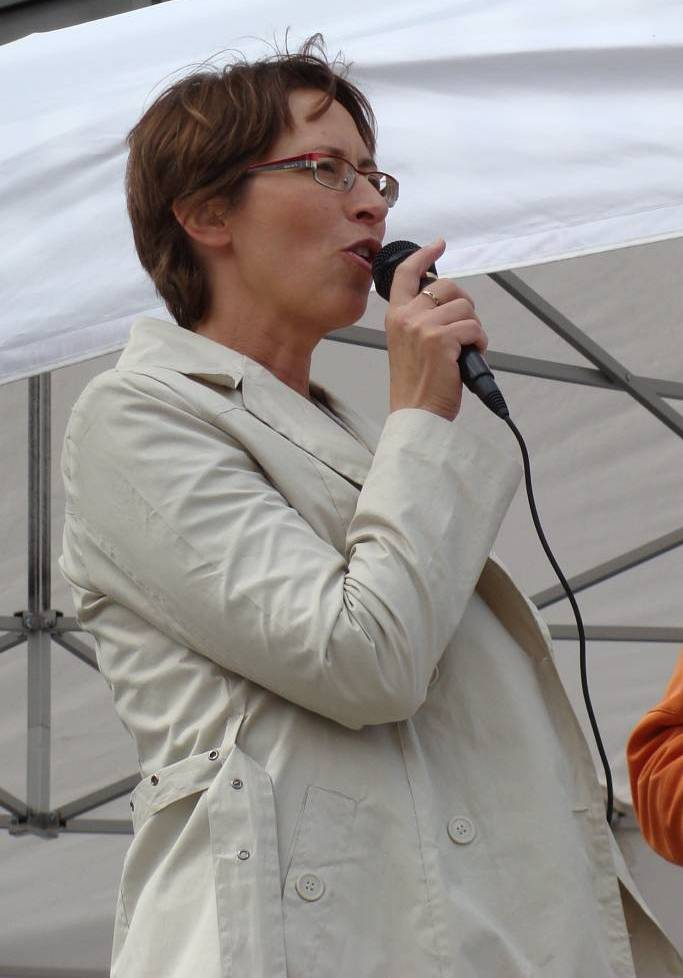
	First party	Second party	Third party
Leader	Petteri Orpo	Antti Rinne	Juha Sipilä
Party	National Coalition	SDP	Centre
Leader since	2016	2014	2012
Last election	1,735 seats, 21.9%	1,729 seats, 19.6%	3,077 seats, 18.7%
Seats won	1,490	1,697	2,824
Seat change	▼245	▼32	▼253
Popular vote	531,599	498,252	450,529
Percentage	20.7%	19.4%	17.5%
Swing	▼1.2pp	▼0.2pp	▼1.1pp
	Fourth party	Fifth party	Sixth party
Leader	Ville Niinistö	Timo Soini	Li Andersson
Party	Green	Finns	Left Alliance
Leader since	2011	1997	2016
Last election	323 seats, 8.5%	1,195 seats, 12.3%	640 seats, 8.0%
Seats won	534	770	658
Seat change	▲211	▼425	▲18
Popular vote	320,235	227,297	226,626
Percentage	12.5%	8.8%	8.8%
Swing	▲4.0pp	▼3.5pp	▲0.8pp
	Seventh party	Eighth party
Leader	Anna-Maja Henriksson	Sari Essayah
Party	RKP	KD
Leader since	2016	2015
Last election	480 seats, 4.7%	300 seats, 3.7%
Seats won	471	316
Seat change	▼9	▲16
Popular vote	125,518	105,551
Percentage	4.9%	4.1%
Swing	▲0.2pp	▲0.4pp

Municipal elections were held in Finland on 9 April 2017 with advance voting between 29 March and 4 April. The councils in 295 municipalities in Finland (excluding Åland) were elected. Several municipalities altered the size of their councils (mainly because of municipal mergers) before the elections which resulted in reduction of seats available from 9,674 to 8,999.

== Opinion polls ==
Poll results are listed in the table below in reverse chronological order, showing the most recent first. The highest percentage figure in each poll is displayed in bold, and the background shaded in the leading party's colour. In the instance that there is a tie, then no figure is shaded. The table uses the date the survey's fieldwork was done, as opposed to the date of publication. However, if that date is unknown, the date of publication will be given instead. List includes only polls that were made for the municipal election.

Date	Polling Firm	KOK	SDP	KESK	PS	VIHR	VAS	SFP	KD	Others	Lead
29 Mar-4 Apr 2017	Taloustutkimus	18.8	18.4	18.6	9.7	12.9	9.4	5.3	5.1	1.8	0.4
23–30 Mar 2017	TNS Gallup	19.7	19.3	18.9	10.7	11.9	8.1	4.8	3.9	2.7	0.4
6-28 Mar 2017	Taloustutkimus	19.1	18.8	18.4	10.3	13.3	8.3	5.1	3.6	3.1	0.3
Mar 2017	Accuscore (Note: Counted by Accuscore, but based on various polls by different polling firms.)	19.4	20.6	19.4	8.8	11.5	8.9	5.1	3.7	2.6	1.2
13 Feb–10 Mar 2017	TNS Gallup	19.0	19.9	19.6	9.4	11.4	9.1	4.8	3.9	2.9	0.3
24 Feb–05 Mar 2017	Tietoykkönen	17.8	20.0	18.6	10.2	12.1	9.0	4.6	4.4	3.3	1.4
20–27 Sep 2016	Tietoykkönen	17.6	20.8	19.2	10.0	12.4	8.3	4.5	4.0	3.2	1.6
**28 Oct 2012**	**Election Results**	**21.9**	**19.6**	**18.7**	**12.3**	**8.5**	**8.0**	**4.7**	**3.7**	**2.6**	**2.3**

== Results ==
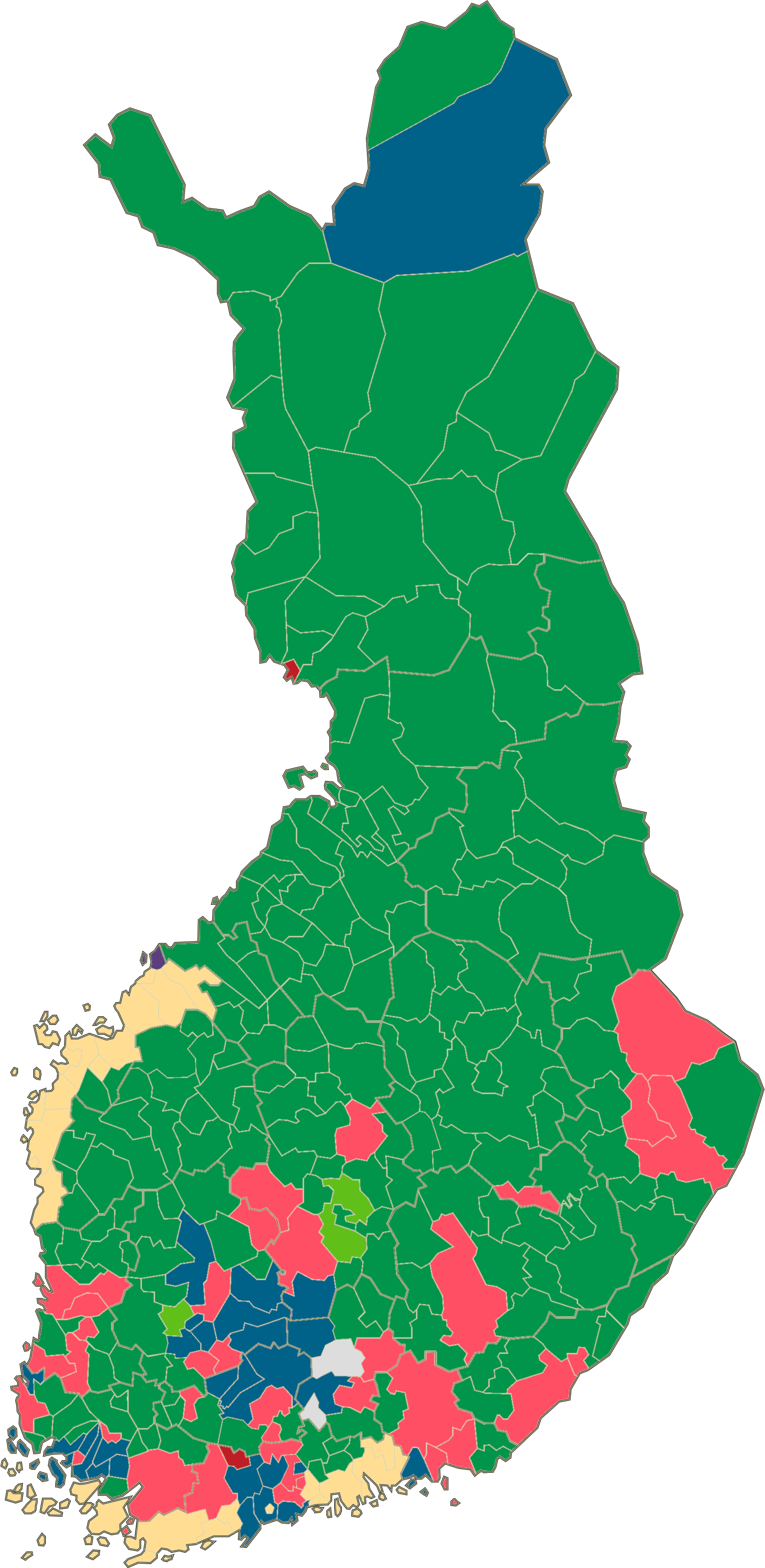
The biggest party in the municipalities after the elections

Finnish municipal elections 2017 results
Party		Votes	%	+/–	Seats	+/–
National Coalition	Kok.	531,599	20.7	–1.2	1,490	–245
Social Democratic Party	SDP	498,252	19.4	–0.2	1,697	–32
Centre Party	Kesk.	450,529	17.5	–1.1	2,824	–253
Green League	Vihr.	320,235	12.5	+3.9	534	+211
Finns Party	PS	227,297	8.8	–3.5	770	–425
Left Alliance	Vas.	226,626	8.8	+0.8	658	+18
Swedish People's Party	RKP	125,518	4.9	+0.2	471	–9
Christian Democrats	KD	105,551	4.1	+0.4	316	+16
Pirate Party	PP	9,119	0.4	+0.1	2	+2
Communist Party	SKP	7,600	0.3	–0.2	2	–7
Feminist Party	FP	6,856	0.3	New	1	New
Liberal Party	Lib.	4,117	0.2	New	5	New
Independence Party	IPU	1,846	0.1	±0.0	2	+2
Animal Justice Party	EOP	1,795	0.1	New	0	New
Communist Workers' Party	KTP	702	0.1	±0.0	0	±0
Total valid votes		2,570,768	100	–	8,999	–675
Invalid votes		14,442	0.6			
Total		2,585,210	100			
Registered voters & turnout		4,391,558	58.9	+0.6		
Source: Yle
