= 2008 Finnish municipal elections =

Municipal elections were held in Finland on 26 October 2008, with advance voting between 15 and 21 October 2008. 10,412 municipal council seats were open for election in 332 municipalities. The number of councillors decreased by over 1,554 compared to the previous election due to the merging of several municipalities.

== National results ==
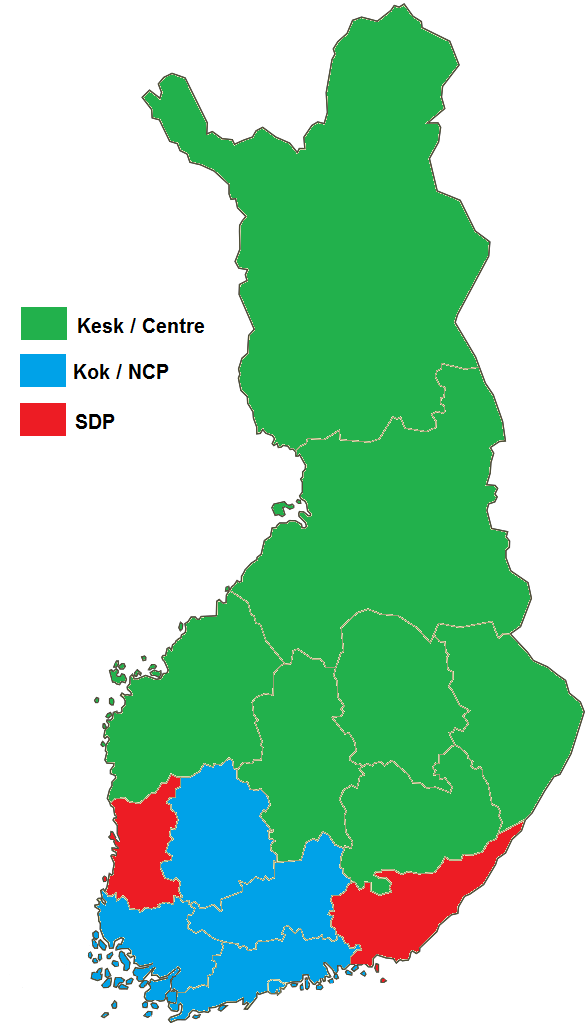
Largest party by constituency: National Coalition Party Centre Party Social Democratic Party

Party	Votes		Council seats	
Party	Number	%	Number	Net ±
National Coalition	597,727	23.45%	2,020	-58
SDP	541,187	21.23%	2,066	-519
Centre	512,220	20.09%	3,518	-907
Green	227,999	8.94%	370	+56
Left Alliance	223,673	8.77%	833	-154
Finns	137,497	5.39%	443	+337
RKP	119,896	4.7%	511	-125
KD	106,639	4.18%	351	-40
Communist Party	13,986	0.55%	9	-7
Seniors' Party	2,618	0.10%	2	+1
Independence Party	1,482	0.06%	2	±0
Communist Workers' Party – For Peace and Socialism	1,063	0.04%	0	-1
For the Poor	1,063	0.04%	1	+1
Workers Party	711	0.03%	0	-1
Others	61,478	2.41%	286	-134
Total	2,549,235		10,412	-1,554
