= 2007 Finnish parliamentary election =

- 18 March 2007

All 200 seats to the Parliament 101 seats were needed for a majority
- Registered: 4,292,436
- Turnout: 65.0% (▼1.7%)
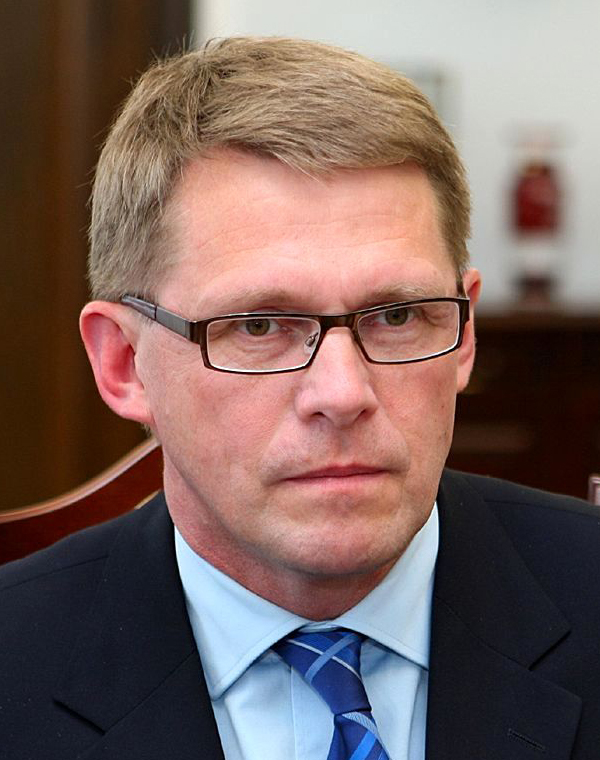

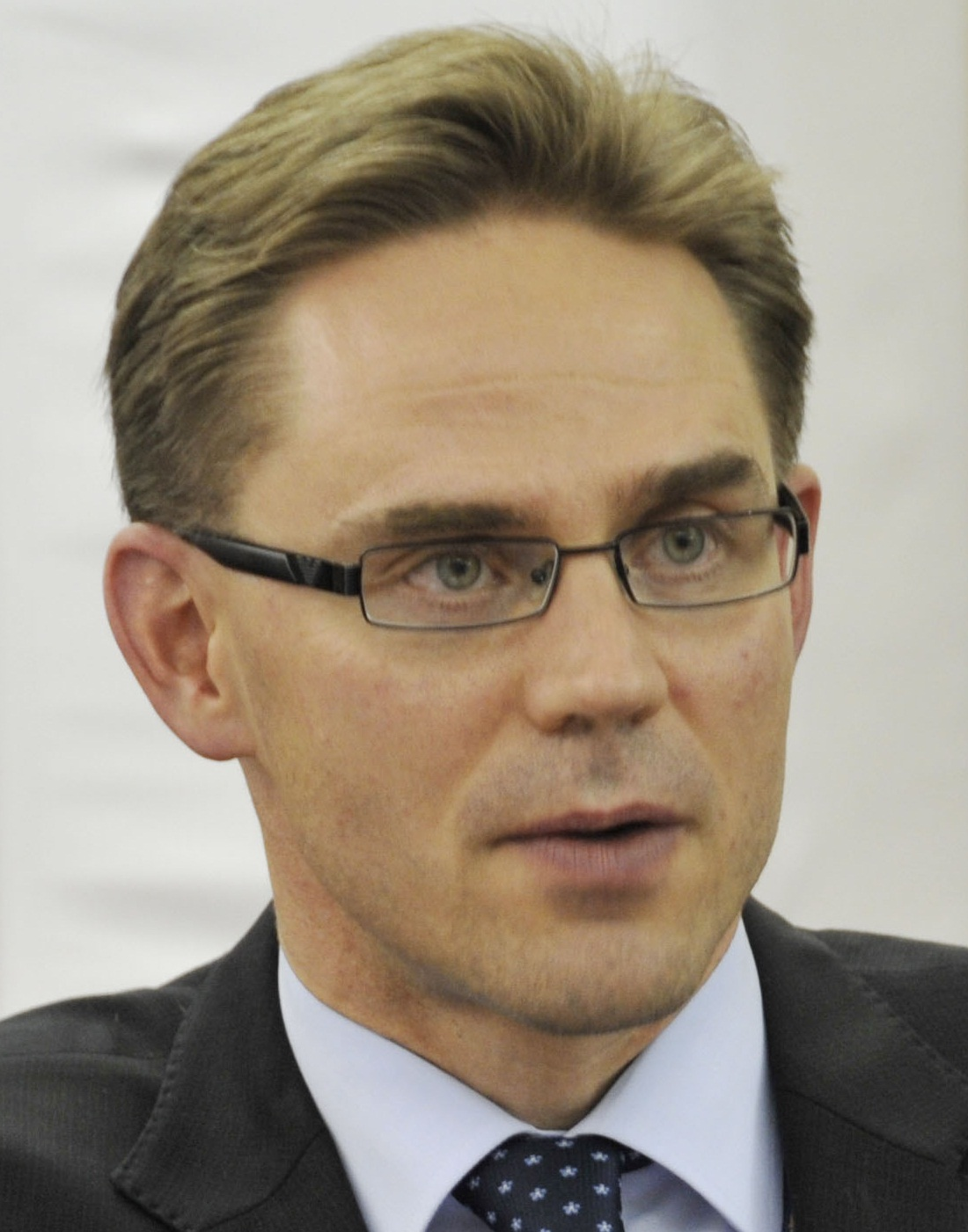

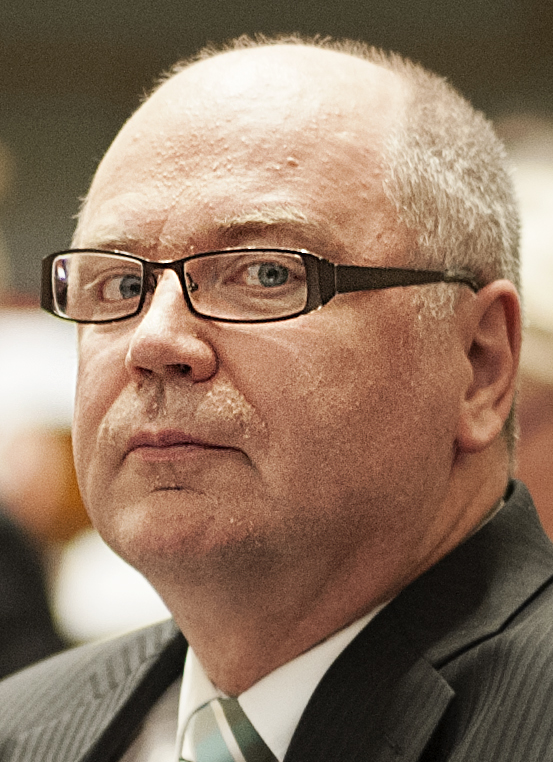

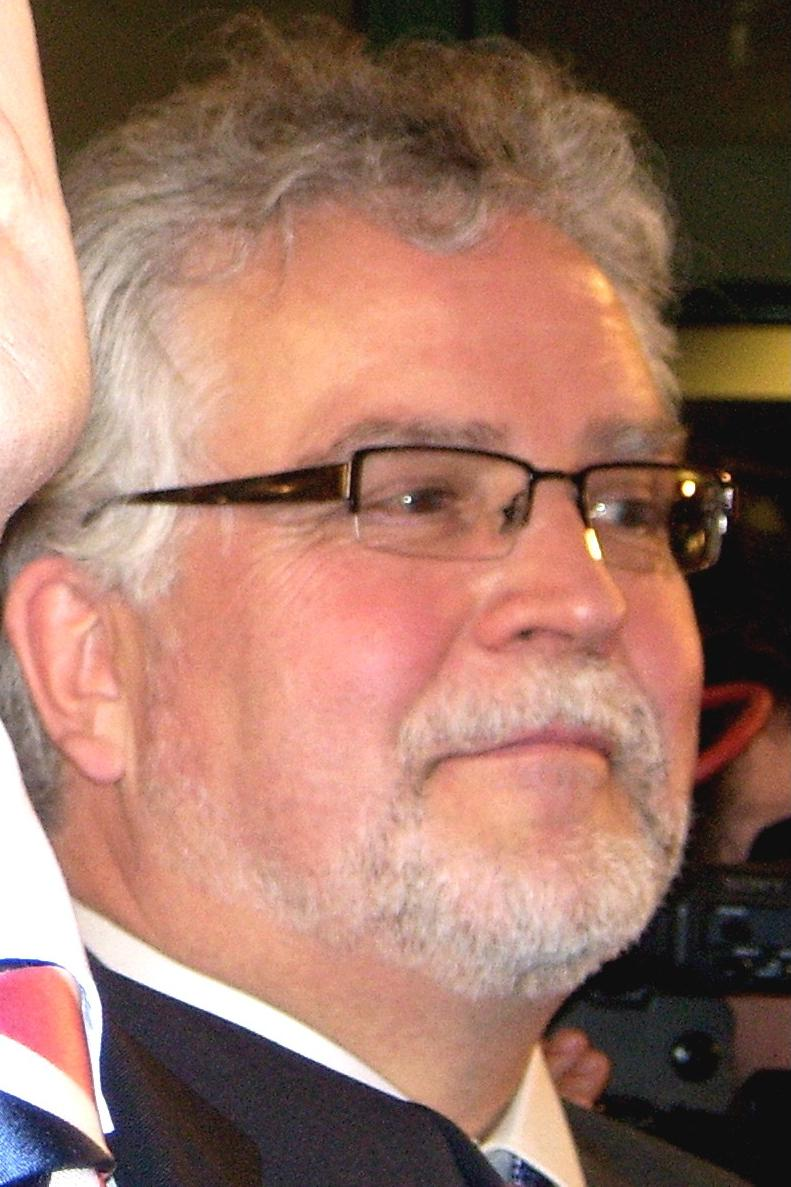

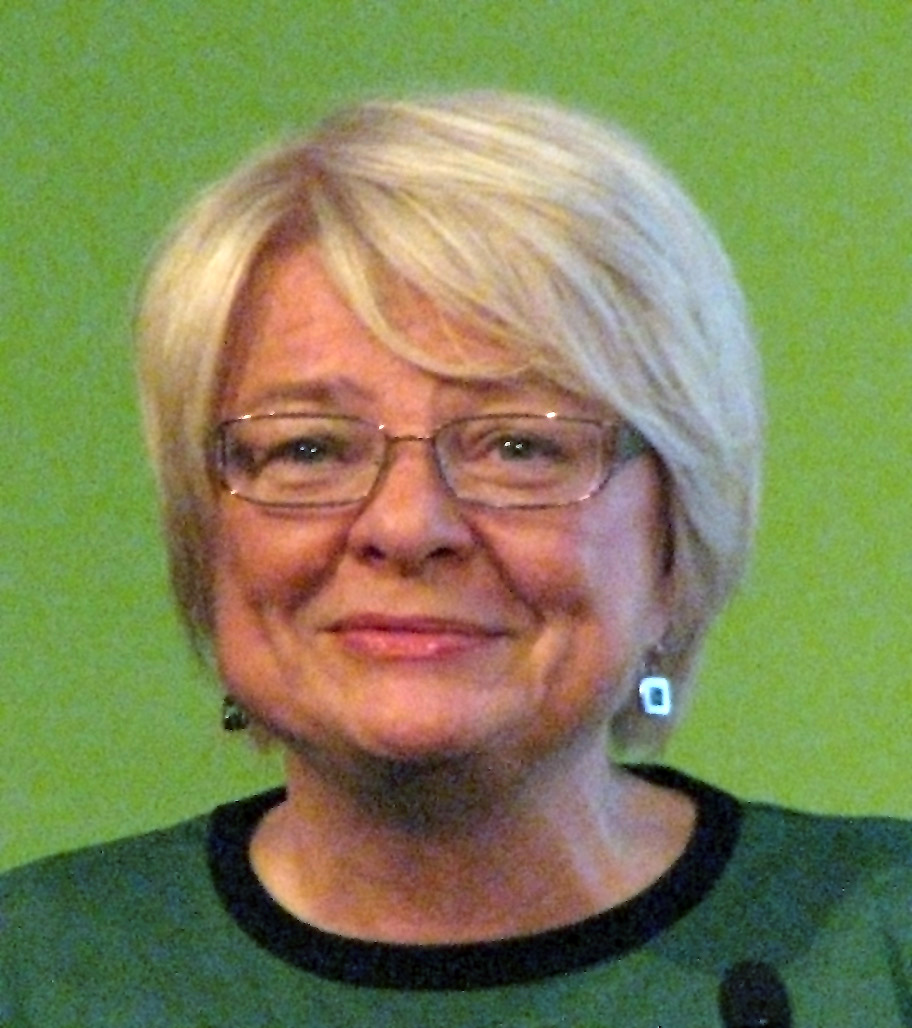

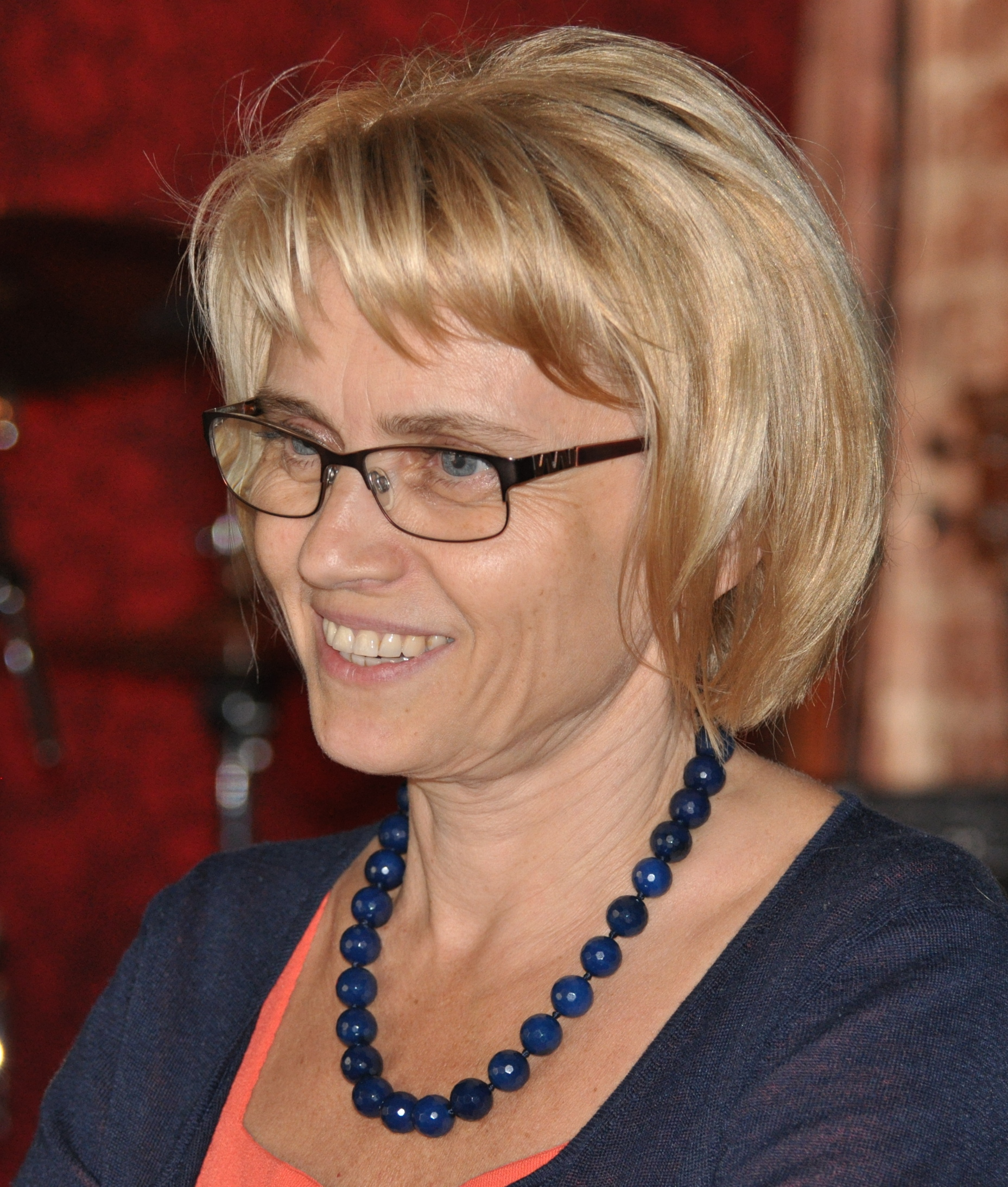

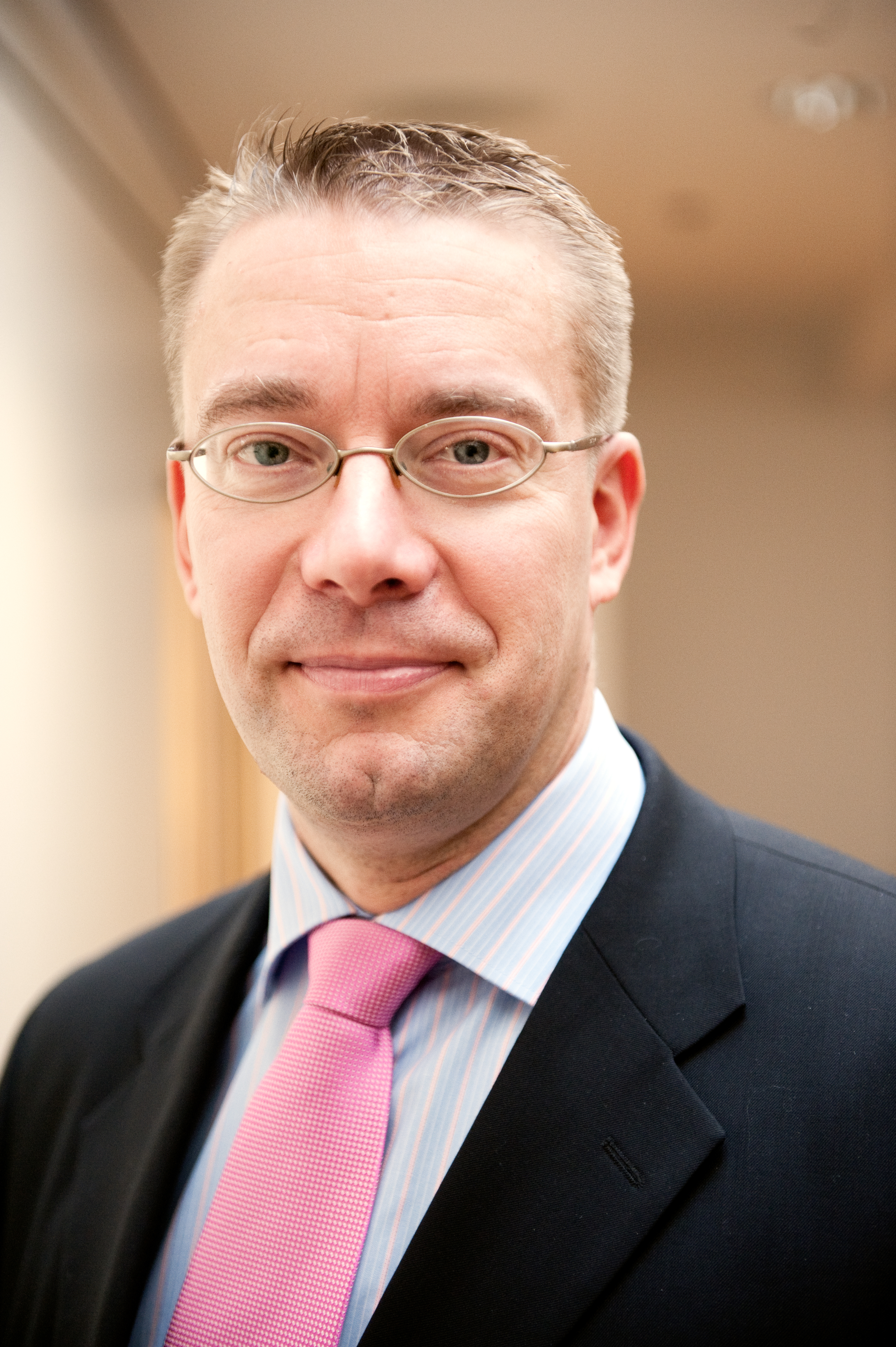

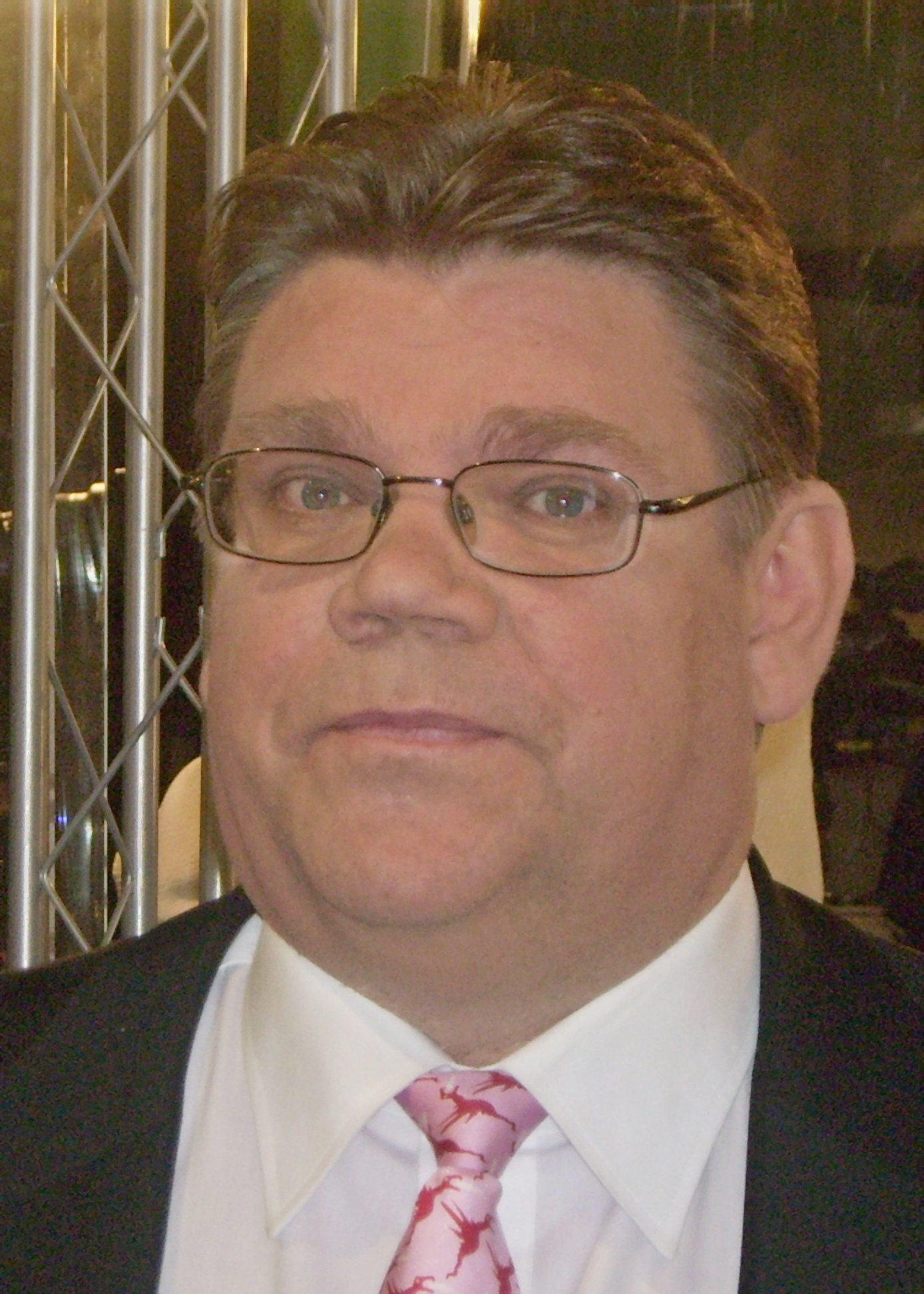
	First party	Second party	Third party
Leader	Matti Vanhanen	Jyrki Katainen	Eero Heinäluoma
Party	Centre	National Coalition	SDP
Last election	55 seats, 24.7%	40 seats, 18.6%	53 seats, 24.5%
Seats won	51	50	45
Seat change	▼4	▲10	▼8
Popular vote	640,428	616,841	594,194
Percentage	23.11%	22.26%	21.44%
Swing	▼1.58pp	▲3.71pp	▼3.03pp
	Fourth party	Fifth party	Sixth party
Leader	Martti Korhonen	Tarja Cronberg	Päivi Räsänen
Party	Left Alliance	Green	KD
Last election	19 seats, 9.93%	14 seats, 8.01%	7 seats, 5.34%
Seats won	17	15	7
Seat change	▼2	▲1	Steady
Popular vote	244,296	234,429	134,790
Percentage	8.82%	8.46%	4.86%
Swing	▼1.11pp	▲0.45pp	▼0.47pp
	Seventh party	Eighth party
Leader	Stefan Wallin	Timo Soini
Party	RKP	Finns
Last election	8 seats, 4.61%	3 seats, 1.57%
Seats won	9	5
Seat change	▲1	▲2
Popular vote	126,520	112,256
Percentage	4.57%	4.05%
Swing	▼0.05pp	▲2.48pp
Prime Minister before election
Matti Vanhanen
Centre
Prime Minister after election
Matti Vanhanen
Centre

Parliamentary elections were held in Finland on 18 March 2007. Early voting was possible from the 7–13 March. The 200 members of the Eduskunta were elected from 15 constituencies.

Election themes included a reduction of income tax and VAT on food. A proposal for a guaranteed minimum income was introduced by some parties. The election debates were characterised by the high economic growth in Finland in recent years, which was thought to mean the government would have extra money to use on welfare services and transfer payments. Largest advertising budgets were spent by the Coalition Party (€2.46M) and the Center Party (€2.48M) with SDP far behind (€1.37M).

Altogether, 2,004 candidates were nominated, 799 of whom were women. About three-quarters of the candidates were nominated by parties currently represented in Parliament. The number of female MPs rose as 84 women were elected (formerly 75), now comprising a record 42% of the 200 MPs.

According to the newspaper Helsingin Sanomat, the number of advance voters rose in comparison with the previous election in 2003. After the Tuesday before the Sunday election, when advance voting ended, the voter turnout had already reached 29.2%, which was more than at the same point in the 2003 elections. However, total voter turnout, at 67.8%, fell short of the 2003 figure, 69.7%, reaching a new low since the 1939 elections.

Many prominent MPs decided not to stand in the election. Former Prime Minister (1995–2003) and Speaker of the outgoing Parliament, Paavo Lipponen left his seat, as did the fifth-longest serving minister of all time, Jan-Erik Enestam, and former Left Alliance party leader Suvi-Anne Siimes, who had harshly criticized her party after her resignation as chairman in 2006. Some former MPs made a comeback, former Finance Minister and presidential candidate Sauli Niinistö and the first European Green minister, Pekka Haavisto, former minister and National Coalition chairman Pertti Salolainen, former foreign minister Paavo Väyrynen and rock musician Pertti "Veltto" Virtanen being the most famous examples. Niinistö also set a record for the highest number of personal votes, 60,498, which is almost twice as high as the previous record, and with the application of the d'Hondt method used in Finland, as many as four other National Coalition candidates were elected to Parliament on the strength of these votes.

The date of the election was near to the 100th anniversary of the first Finnish parliamentary elections, which were held on 15–16 March 1907, and were the first elections held under universal suffrage in Europe.

== Electoral system ==
Some constituencies elect only six or seven MPs, resulting in a high election threshold for a given party, favouring large parties and reducing the proportionality of the result. Because of this, the party leader of the Greens, Tarja Cronberg, lost her seat in the district of Northern Karelia, the party's only one, despite their getting 11.7% of the vote there. Her case, made seemingly even more unfair by her impressive personal total of 7,802 votes, greater than that of most of those elected, has been held up in the media as a symbol of the flaws in the present system. The constituencies of 2007 were mostly based on the old provinces; the largest difference was counting Helsinki as a separate district. The case has sparked a multi-party initiative that could result in a reform, to become effective in the 2015 parliamentary elections at the earliest.

== Results ==
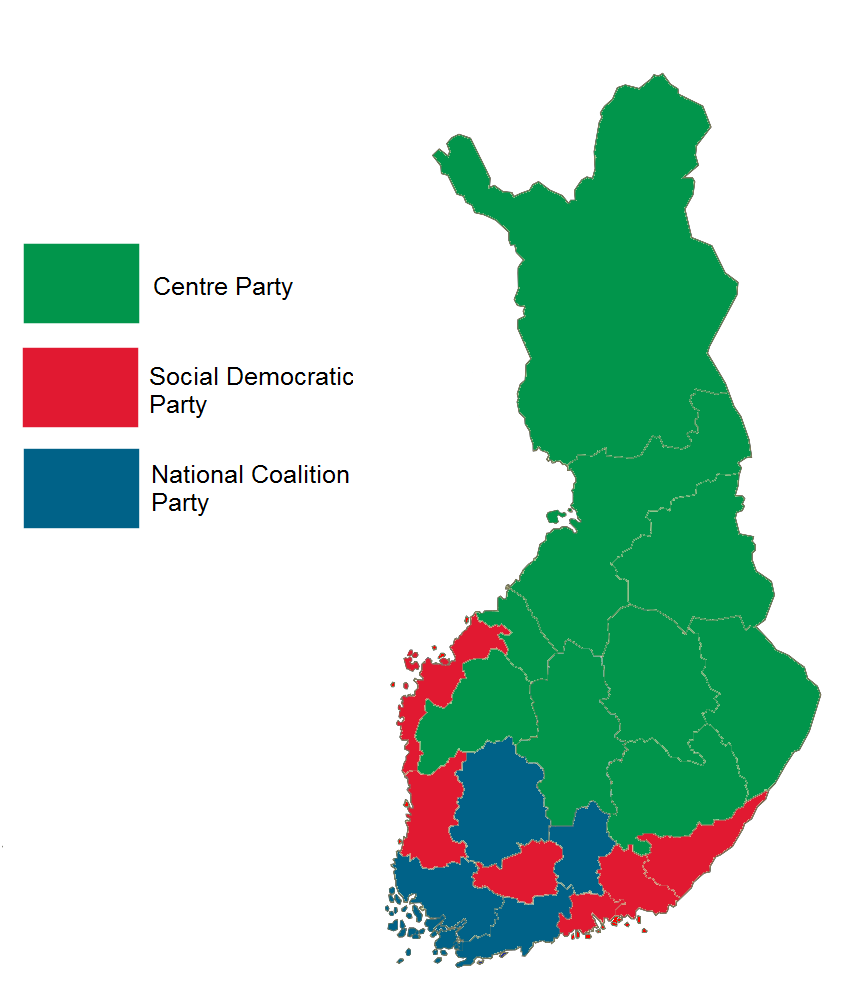
Results by region Centre Party Social Democratic Party National Coalition Party

The elections were a major victory for the opposition National Coalition Party under Jyrki Katainen. It gained ten seats and became the second-largest party in Finland. The main government partners, the Centre Party and the Social Democrats, both lost ground. With the Left Alliance also losing seats, the labour parties received the worst result in the 100-year history of Finnish democracy; for the Social Democrats, the result was the worst since 1962, while the Left Alliance has lost seats in both elections held since 1999. The Centre Party, despite the loss, maintained its position as the biggest party in Parliament, with one seat more than the National Coalition. It was also the only time, except for the parliamentary election of 1930, that the Centre Party and the National Coalition Party together have an absolute majority in Parliament. The outcome led to the formation of a new center-right government and the left-leaning Social Democrats were left out in opposition for the first time since 1995.

Winners also include the True Finns, who gained two seats. Party leader Timo Soini in particular took in a massive personal total of almost 20,000 votes, the third greatest in the country. The Green League gained one seat with its best ever showing in parliamentary elections, but party leader Tarja Cronberg lost her seat in the small district of Northern Karelia. The Swedish People's Party gained one seat as well, although losing votes compared to the 2003 elections.

Incumbent Prime Minister Matti Vanhanen, as party leader of the Centre Party, formed a new government with Centre Party, National Coalition, the Greens and Swedish People's Party. These parties have 125 seats out of 200 in the parliament. The government coalition is centre-right and calls itself "blue-green government" after the blue colour of National Coalition and the green colours of Centre and the Greens.

The election was a major defeat (8 seats lost, 15% fewer won than in 2003) for the Social Democrats, and sparked an internal investigation. The party conducted a campaign that had a simplistic anti-Conservative message. Meanwhile, the trade union SAK, strongly associated with SDP, conducted a similar anti-Conservative campaign. The association between the two organizations was abundantly clear, as the SDP's chairman Eero Heinäluoma was a former SAK director. The campaigns failed spectacularly, and according to the internal investigation, the attempt to challenge the Conservatives was a failure. One TV commercial, which showed a capitalist devouring a meal and laughing how "workers do not vote", drew widely publicized criticism even before its launch, when the TV commercial was shown in news (and on YouTube). The SDP's internal investigation also pointed out that the party's campaign promises had poor credibility, since the SDP had been in the government for years but (at least perceivably) had not delivered on them. For example, the SDP chairman Eero Heinäluoma had prevented a rise in the student benefit.

As many as eight very small parties were removed from the registry of political parties as a result of their repeated failure to gain seats in the 2003 and 2007 elections: Suomen työväenpuolue (Workers Party), Independence Party, Liberaalit, Forces for Change in Finland, For the Poor, Yhteisvastuu puolue ("Common Responsibility Party"), Suomen Isänmaallinen Kansallis-Liitto (named after IKL, or Isänmaallinen kansanliike, an organization banned in 1944) and Finnish People's Blue-Whites. Currently, there are three parties in the registry that failed to gain seats in the 2007 elections: Communist Party of Finland, Suomen Senioripuolue (a pensioners' party) and For Peace and Socialism - Communist Workers Party. The removal is not punitive, however, as these parties are allowed register themselves again.

After the Finnish Parliamentary elections on 18 March 2007, the seats were divided among eight parties as follows:

Party	Votes	%	Seats	+/–
Centre Party	640,428	23.11	51	–4
National Coalition Party	616,841	22.26	50	+10
Social Democratic Party	594,194	21.44	45	–8
Left Alliance	244,296	8.82	17	–2
Green League	234,429	8.46	15	+1
Christian Democrats	134,790	4.86	7	0
Swedish People's Party	126,520	4.57	9	+1
Finns Party	112,256	4.05	5	+2
Communist Party	18,277	0.66	0	0
Pensioners for People	16,715	0.60	0	0
Civic Alliance (C–FS–LIB–ObS)	9,561	0.35	1	0
Independence Party	5,541	0.20	0	New
Finnish People's Blue-Whites	3,913	0.14	0	0
Liberals	3,171	0.11	0	0
For the Poor	2,521	0.09	0	0
Communist Workers' Party – For Peace and Socialism	2,007	0.07	0	0
Workers' Party	1,764	0.06	0	New
Åland Social Democrats	1,607	0.06	0	0
Patriotic People's Movement	821	0.03	0	0
Joint Responsibility Party	164	0.01	0	0
Independents	1,420	0.05	0	–
Total	2,771,236	100.00	200	0
Valid votes	2,771,236	99.30		
Invalid/blank votes	19,516	0.70		
Total votes	2,790,752	100.00		
Registered voters/turnout	4,292,436	65.02		
Source: Tilastokeskus

=== By region ===
Province	Centre	National Coalition	Social Democratic	Left Alliance	Green League	Christian League	Swedish People's	True Finns	Other	Electorate	Votes	Valid	Invalid
South Savo	30,759	15,530	22,704	1,419	5,714	2,925	0	2,653	531	131,962	83,064	82,235	829
North Savo	45,607	21,696	24,760	14,253	5,073	10,316	0	4,334	1,210	203,878	127,993	127,249	744
North Karelia	30,391	10,041	26,942	2,163	9,955	2,574	0	2,428	747	136,308	85,743	85,241	502
Kainuu	18,565	4,216	4,666	9,877	1,143	1,166	0	1,863	331	69,657	42,084	41,827	257
Uusimaa	73,802	219,607	152,262	50,274	110,217	25,917	48,328	34,274	16,718	1,098,278	737,007	731,399	5,608
Eastern Uusimaa	5,510	8,859	9,075	2,416	3,941	1,143	14,984	2,760	571	73,877	49,586	49,259	327
Southwest Finland	38,610	66,793	53,281	25,937	22,868	11,377	13,369	6,168	5,662	372,966	245,571	244,065	1,506
Kanta-Häme	19,696	19,457	27,939	6,863	5,687	6,924	0	1,824	1,375	135,934	90,528	89,765	763
Päijät-Häme	18,687	27,251	24,963	8,882	5,941	7,652	0	2,358	3,614	162,621	100,172	99,348	824
Kymenlaakso	19,724	23,606	25,983	9,901	4,432	5,978	0	5,671	636	152,153	96,719	95,931	788
South Karelia	19,974	15,586	20,573	1,826	3,645	5,034	0	3,228	588	111,798	71,035	70,454	581
Central Finland	47,058	21,008	34,710	10,561	9,859	11,142	0	3,616	3,849	219,648	142,704	141,803	901
Southern Ostrobothnia	52,803	21,457	12,254	3,259	1,548	4,532	243	9,237	1,428	157,666	107,258	106,761	497
Ostrobothnia	9,275	10,116	12,055	6,192	1,462	7,430	47,390	2,436	774	149,323	97,713	97,130	583
Satakunta	31,045	26,799	36,527	14,958	4,324	3,003	0	6,726	1,561	191,729	125,777	124,943	834
Pirkanmaa	40,458	62,995	59,865	24,161	22,024	15,655	0	12,044	13,298	380,804	252,153	250,500	1,653
Central Ostrobothnia	16,445	2,528	6,411	1,891	533	4,957	2,206	2,781	308	58,148	38,280	38,060	220
Northern Ostrobothnia	80,248	27,771	24,629	27,110	12,959	6,124	0	6,123	2,339	298,260	188,407	187,303	1,104
Lapland	41,771	11,525	14,595	22,353	3,104	941	0	1,732	774	162,315	97,442	96,795	647
Source: European Election Database
