= Workers' Party of Finland =

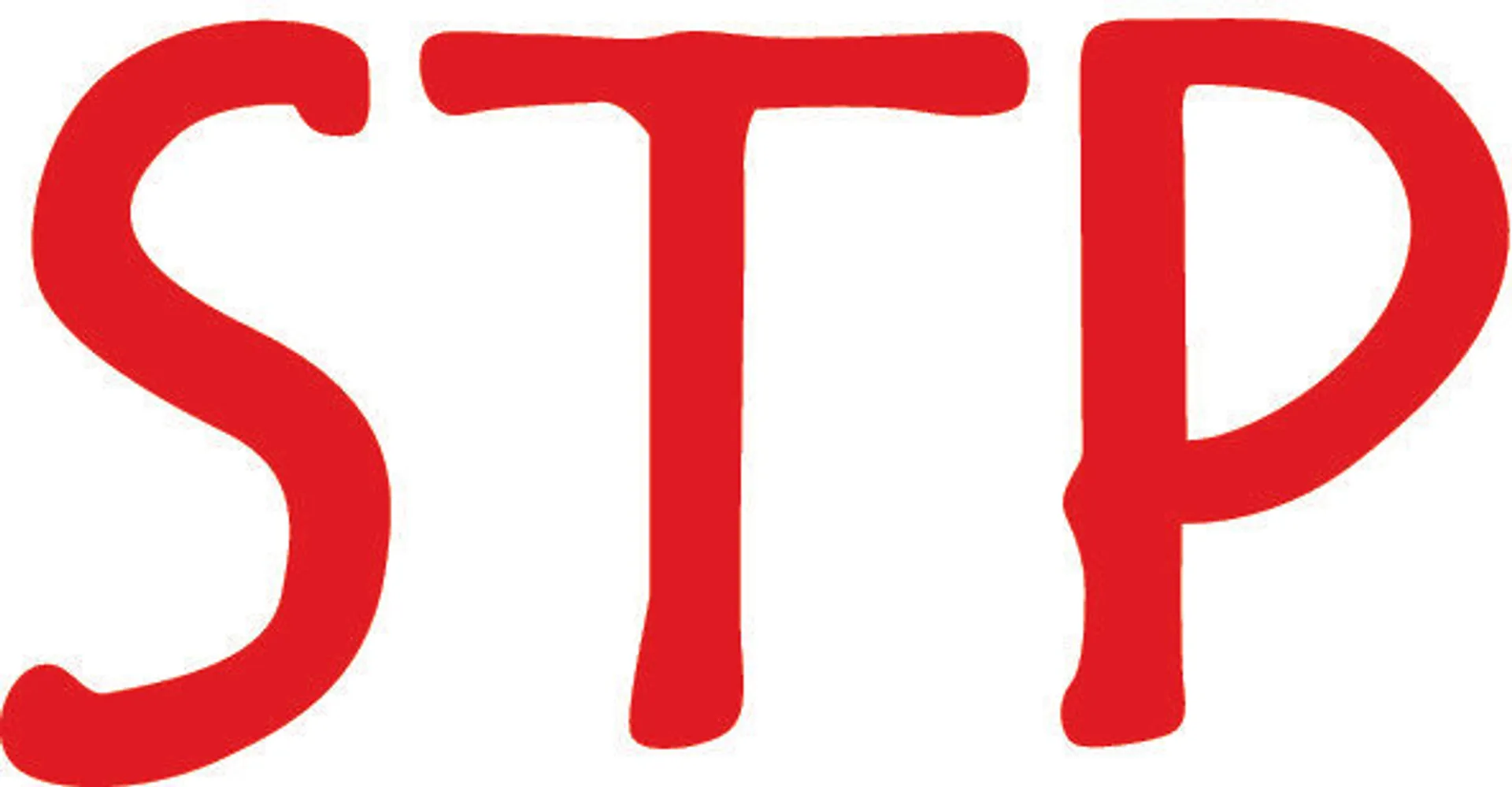
- Finnish name: Suomen Työväenpuolue STP
- Swedish name: Finlands Arbetarparti FAP
- Leader: Juhani Tanski
- Founded: 1999 (VEV); 2006 (STP)
- Headquarters: Helsinki
- Ideology: Socialism
- Political position: Left-wing
- Colours: Red
- Parliament: 0 / 200
- European Parliament: 0 / 13
- Municipalities: 0 / 9,674

Website
- suomentyovaenpuolue.blogspot.com

Workers' Party of Finland (Finnish: Suomen Työväenpuolue, Swedish: Finlands Arbetarparti) was a left-wing political party in Finland. The STP was founded in 2006 as a successor to the Alternative League (1999–2006).

In the 2007 parliamentary election the party obtained 1,764 votes. The party was removed from the party register in May 2007 after left without parliamentary seats in two consecutive elections, but they re-registered the same year after collecting 5,000 signed supporter cards again.

The Workers Party of Finland was formed in Helsinki 17 September 2006. Four of the six elected party leaders were activists of the League of Communists, a 2002 split of the Communist Workers' Party. Juhani Tanski was elected president of the STP.

The party has a bimonthly newspaper Kansan ääni, which is shared between the organizations League of Communists, People's Front Against European Union (EUVKr), and Work Against War and Fascism (SFT).

== Elections ==
Results
Parliament
Year	MPs	Votes	
2007	0	1,764	0.06%
2011	0	1 857	0.06%
2015	0	984	0.03%
Municipal
Year	Councillors	Votes	
2000	0	400	0.02%
2004	1	2,257	0.09%
2008	0	703	0.03%
European parliament
Year	MEPs	Votes	
2009	0	3,169	0.19%

== See also ==
- List of Communist Party (Finland) breakaway parties
