= Pyongyang Declaration =

1992 agreement between communist and socialist parties

The Pyongyang Declaration, officially titled Let Us Defend and Advance the Cause of Socialism, was a statement signed by a number of political parties on 20 April 1992 that calls for the unity of the socialist camp and a vow to safeguard socialism. Representatives of 70 communist and socialist parties from 51 countries arrived in Pyongyang, North Korea, to celebrate Kim Il Sung's 80th birthday. While there, the delegates had many bilateral and multilateral contacts with each other and decided to issue a declaration reiterating their commitment to socialism in spite of the collapse of the USSR and a number of other communist regimes in recent years. On 20 April, the declaration was signed by delegates of 69 parties, including 48 party leaders.

== Text ==
This translation of the Declaration appeared in Proletarian #18 (June 2007):

The representatives of political parties from different countries of the world who are striving for the victory of socialism publish this declaration with a firm conviction to defend and advance the socialist cause.

Ours is an era of independence and the socialist cause is a sacred one aimed at realising the independence of the popular masses.

Socialism suffered a setback in some countries in recent years. As a consequence of this, the imperialists and reactionaries are claiming that socialism has ‘come to an end’. This is nothing but a sophistry to beautify and embellish capitalism and patronise the old order.

The setback of socialism and the revival of capitalism in some countries is causing a great loss to the achievement of the socialist cause, but it can never be interpreted as the denial of the superiority of socialism and of the reactionary character of capitalism.

Socialism has long been the ideal of mankind and it represents the future of mankind.

Socialist society is, in essence, a genuine society for the people where the popular masses are the masters of everything and everything serves them.

But the capitalist society is an unfair one where ‘the rich get ever richer and the poor poorer’. In this society money decides everything, exploitation of man by man predominates and a handful of exploiter classes lord it over all. It is inevitably accompanied by political non-rights, unemployment, poverty, drugs, crimes and other kinds of all social evils which trample human dignity underfoot.

Only socialism can eliminate domination, subjugation and social inequality of all kinds and ensure the people substantial freedom, equality, true democracy and human rights.

The popular masses have long carried on an arduous struggle for the victory of socialism and shed much blood in this course.

The path of socialism is an untrodden one and, therefore, the advance of socialism is inevitably accompanied by trials and difficulties. One of the reasons for the unsuccessful construction of socialism in some countries is that they failed to build a social structure conforming to the fundamental requirements of the popular masses and build socialism suited to the demand of the theory of scientific socialism.

The guarantee for the advance of a socialist society lies in that the popular masses become the genuine masters of the society.

Such a society makes a triumphant advance – this is a truth and reality proved by theory and practice.

The parties and progressive mankind aspiring after socialism have drawn a very precious lesson therefrom.

In order to defend and advance the socialist cause individual parties should firmly maintain independence and firmly build up their own forces.

The socialist movement is an independent one. Socialism is carved out and built with a country or national state as a unit. The socialist cause in each country should be fulfilled on the responsibility of the party and people of that country.

Each party should work out lines and policies which tally with the actual situation of the country where it is active and with the demands of its people and implement them by relying on the popular masses.

It should not abandon its revolutionary principles at any time and under any circumstances but uplift the banner of socialism.

The socialist cause is a national one and, at the same time, a common cause of mankind.

All parties should cement the ties of comradely unity, cooperation and solidarity on the principles of independence and equality.

Now that the imperialists and reactionaries are attacking socialism and people in an international collusion, the parties which are building socialism or aspiring after it should defend and advance socialism on an international scale and strengthen mutual support and solidarity in their efforts for social justice, democracy, the right to existence and peace against imperialist domination, subjugation by capital and neo-colonialism.

This is an international duty incumbent upon all parties and progressive forces for socialism and an undertaking for their own cause.

We will advance under the unfurled banner of socialism in firm unity with all progressive political parties, organisations, and peoples of the world who are striving to defend socialism against capitalism and imperialism.

Let us all fight it out to open up the future of mankind with a firm conviction in the cause of socialism.

Final victory is on the part of the people fighting in unity for socialism.

The socialist cause shall not perish.

== Signatories ==
The Declaration was originally signed on 20 April 1992 by 69 parties. The Mongolian People's Party later withdrew from the declaration, the only party to do so. According to Korean Central News Agency, "Six months later, the number of signatories reached more than 140. "They numbered over 170 one year later". At the time of the ten-year anniversary in 2002 there were 258 signatories. In 2012 there were 280. The number of signatories reached 300 in 2017. North Korea often cites these numbers for propaganda purposes.

Original signatories
Withdrawn

List of signatories
Country	Party	Date
Albania	Communist Party of Albania	20 April 1992
Angola	People's Movement for the Liberation of Angola	20 April 1992
Argentina	Communist Party of Argentina	20 April 1992
Argentina	Quebracho	22 March 2012
Bangladesh	Workers Party of Bangladesh	20 April 1992
Bangladesh	Jatiya Samajtantrik Dal	20 April 1992
Bangladesh	Socialist Party of Bangladesh	15 April 1997
Bangladesh	Bangladesh Jatiya Party	21 April 2016
Bangladesh	People's Solidarity Movement of Bangladesh	24 April 2016
Bangladesh	Revolutionary Workers' Party of Bangladesh	24 April 2016
Bangladesh	Democratic Revolutionary Party of Bangladesh	24 April 2016
Bangladesh	United Communist League of Bangladesh	24 April 2016
Bangladesh	Communist Party of Bangladesh	
Barbados	Workers Party of Barbados	20 April 1992
Belarus	Communist Party of the Workers of Belarus	12 April 2012
Belgium	Workers' Party of Belgium	20 April 1992
Bermuda	Progressive Labour Party	20 April 1992
Benin	Revolutionary Party of Benin	
Bolivia	Bolivian Communist Party	20 April 1992
Brazil	Brazilian Communist Party	20 April 1992
Brazil	Communist Party of Brazil	20 April 1992
Bulgaria	Bulgarian Communist Party – Marxists	20 April 1992
Bulgaria	Communist Party of Bulgaria	10 October 1997
Chile	Communist Party of Chile	20 April 1992
Chile	Socialist Party of Chile	20 April 1992
Colombia	Colombian Communist Party	20 April 1992
Costa Rica	Costa Rican People's Party	20 April 1992
Cyprus	Progressive Party of Working People	20 April 1992
DR Congo	National Movement of the Genuine Lumumbist Combantants	
DR Congo	Workers' Party of Zaire	
DR Congo	People's Rally for Socialism	
DR Congo	Convention of United Democratic Congolese	28 November 2016
DR Congo	Workers' Party of Democratic Congo	2 April 2012
DR Congo	Popular Revolutionary Party	15 April 2015
DR Congo	Unified Lumumbist Party	15 April 2017
DR Congo	Workers' Party of the Democratic Republic of the Congo	2 January 2018
Denmark	Common Course	20 April 1992
Denmark	Communist Forum of Denmark	20 April 1992
Denmark	Communist Party in Denmark	18 October 2018
Dominica	Dominica Labour Party	20 April 1992
Dominican Republic	Dominican Communist Party	20 April 1992
Dominican Republic	United Left Movement	20 April 1992
Ecuador	Communist Party of Ecuador	20 April 1992
Egypt	Egyptian Arab Socialist Party	
Finland	Communist Workers' Party – For Peace and Socialism	20 April 1992
Finland	League of Communists	
Germany	German Communist Party	20 April 1992
Grenada	Maurice Bishop Patriotic Movement	20 April 1992
Guatemala	United National Hope of Guatemala	18 March 2006
Guyana	Caribbean National Movement	20 April 1992
Honduras	United Democratic Party of Honduras	6 April 2006}}
Hungary	Hungarian Socialist Workers' Party	20 April 1992
India	Communist Party of India (Marxist)	20 April 1992
India	Communist Party of India	20 April 1992
India	All India Forward Bloc	
Iraq	Arab Socialist Ba'ath Party – Iraq Region	20 April 1992
Ireland	Communist Party of Ireland	20 April 1992
Ireland	Communist Party of Ireland (Marxist–Leninist)	15 February 1999
Italy	Movement for Peace and Socialism	20 April 1992
Jordan	Jordanian Communist Party	20 April 1992
Jordan	Arab Defenders' Party	5 April 1997
Jordan	Christian Arab Democratic Party	5 April 1997
Kyrgyzstan	Marxist–Leninist Reunification Communist Party of the Kyrgyz People	30 March 2007
Kyrgyzstan	Aalam-Party of Non-Parties	15 April 2016
Lebanon	Syrian Social Nationalist Party in Lebanon	20 April 1992
Malta	Communist Party of Malta	20 April 1992
Martinique	Communist Party of Martinique	20 April 1992
Mexico	Popular Socialist Party of Mexico	20 April 1992
Mexico	Socialist Party of Mexico	25 May 2003
Mexico	Communists' Party of Mexico	28 September 2003
Moldova	Party of Socialists of the Republic of Moldova	7 September 2018
Mongolia	Mongolian People's Revolutionary Party	20 April 1992
Namibia	South West Africa People's Organisation	20 April 1992
Nepal	Communist Party of Nepal (Unified Marxist–Leninist)	20 April 1992
Nepal	Communist Party of Nepal (Unity Centre)	20 April 1992
Nepal	Nepal Workers and Peasants Party	20 April 1992
Nepal	Communist Party of Nepal (Marxist–Leninist)	2007
Nepal	United Socialist Nationalist Party of Nepal	3 April 2017
Nigeria	People's Progressive Party	23 April 2016
Nigeria	Better Nigeria Progressive Party	10 February 2017
North Korea	Workers' Party of Korea	20 April 1992
Norway	Norwegian Communist Party	20 April 1992
Paraguay	Communist Party of Paraguay	20 April 1992
Peru	Revolutionary Socialist Party	
Poland	Polish League of Communists (Proletariat)	20 April 1992
Puerto Rico	Nationalist Party-Liberty	22 March 2012
Romania	New Socialist Party of Romania	20 April 1992
Romania	Romanian Communist Party	
Russia	All-Union Communist Party of Bolsheviks	20 April 1992
Russia	Russian Communist Workers Party	20 April 1992
Russia	Union of Communists	20 April 1992
Russia	Socialist Workers' Party	
Russia	Party of Peace and Unity	10 April 1997
Russia	Russian All-People's Union	12 September 2018
Russia	Communists of Russia	23 December 2020
Saint Kitts & Nevis	Saint Kitts and Nevis Labour Party	20 April 1992
Serbia	New Communist Party of Yugoslavia	
South Africa	South African Communist Party	20 April 1992
Spain	Communist Party of the Peoples of Spain	20 April 1992
Spain	Democratic Workers' Party	13 April 2015
Sri Lanka	Communist Party of Sri Lanka	20 April 1992
Sri Lanka	People's Liberation Front	2007
Suriname	National Democratic Party	20 April 1992
Sweden	Workers' Party – The Communists	20 April 1992
Syria	Arab Socialist Ba'ath Party – Syria Region	20 April 1992
Syria	Socialist Unionist Party	
Tajikistan	Tajik Communist Party	
Transnistria	Transnistrian Communist Party	31 March 2017
Trinidad & Tobago	February 18th Movement	20 April 1992
Tunisia	Popular Unity Party	20 April 1992
Turkey	Socialist Party	20 April 1992
United Kingdom	Communist Party of Britain	20 April 1992
United Kingdom	New Communist Party of Britain	20 April 1992
United Kingdom	Revolutionary Communist Party of Britain (Marxist–Leninist)	1990s
United Kingdom	Communist Organisation of Britain	
United Kingdom	Communist Party of Great Britain (Marxist–Leninist)	1 May 2007
United States	Communist Party USA	20 April 1992
United States	Socialist Workers Party	20 April 1992
United States	Workers World Party	20 April 1992
Venezuela	Communist Party of Venezuela	20 April 1992
Venezuela	New Alternative	20 April 1992
Venezuela	Tupamaro	2018
Venezuela	New Forces Party	
Yugoslavia	League of Communists – Movement for Yugoslavia	20 April 1992

== See also ==
- International Meeting of Communist and Workers' Parties
- Initiative of Communist and Workers' Parties
- Our Socialism Centred on the Masses Shall not Perish
