= 1996 Finnish municipal elections =

Municipal elections were held in Finland on 20 October 1996. The election had to be renewed in Keminmaa on 8 June because of uncertainties with advance voting.

== National results ==
Party	Votes	%	Seats	+/–
Social Democratic Party	583,562	24.55	2,743	–387
Centre Party	518,305	21.81	4,459	+461
National Coalition Party	514,313	21.64	2,167	+158
Left Alliance	246,412	10.37	1,128	–191
Green League	149,334	6.28	292	–51
Swedish People's Party	129,518	5.45	671	+7
Finnish Christian League	75,494	3.18	353	0
Young Finns	31,429	1.32	29	New
Finns Party	21,999	0.93	138	–216
Liberal People's Party	8,766	0.37	25	–24
Communist Workers' Party – For Peace and Socialism	4,483	0.19	3	+2
Pensioners' Party	2,417	0.10	1	–1
Seniors' Party	2,033	0.09	2	–3
Alliance for Free Finland	1,364	0.06	6	New
Natural Law Party	1,217	0.05	0	New
Ecological Party the Greens	874	0.04	1	–2
Others	85,420	3.59	464	+123
Total	2,376,940	100.00	12,482	–89
Source: Tilastokeskus
