= Olavi Mäenpää =

Finnish politician (1950–2018)

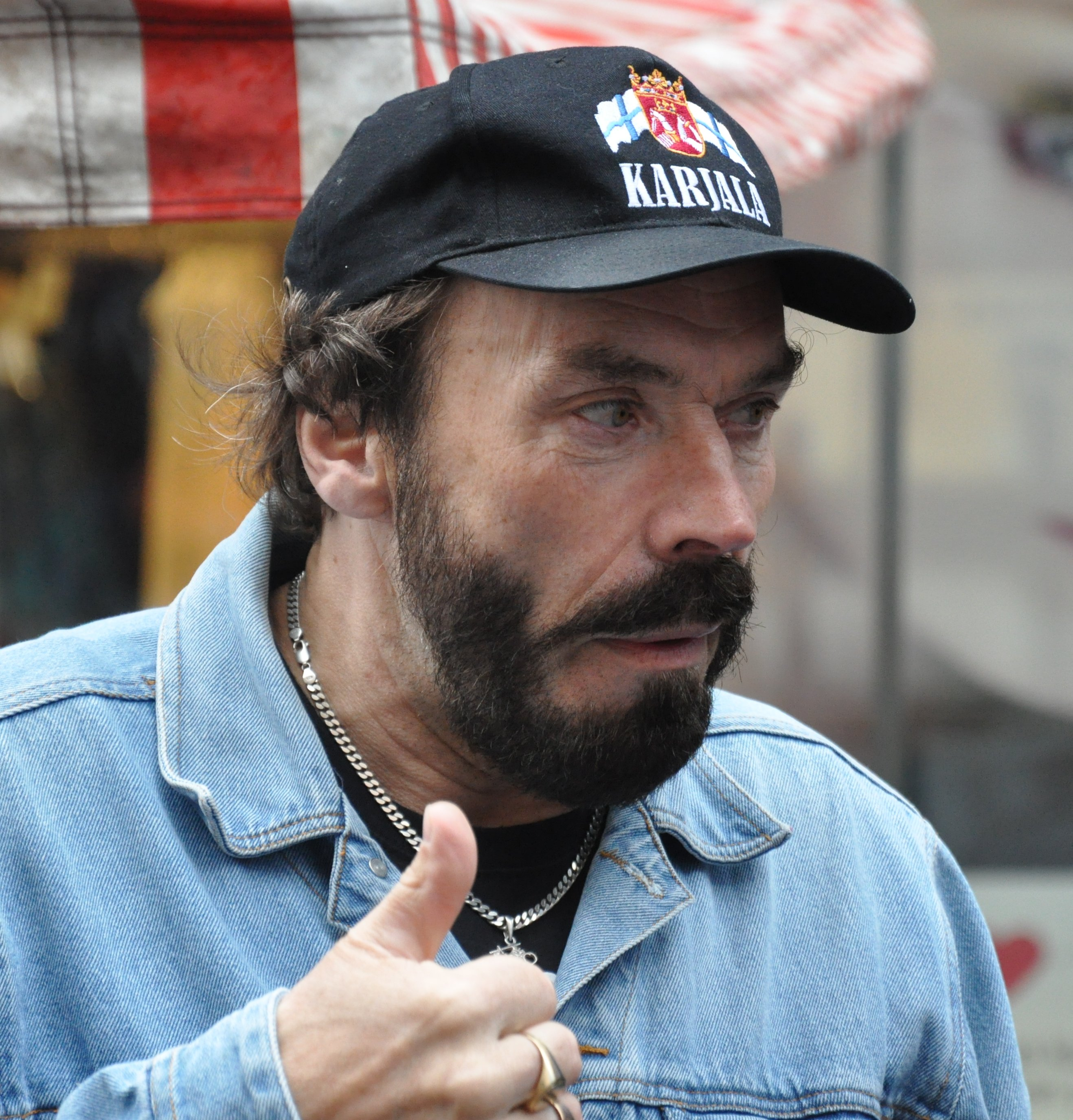
Olavi Mäenpää in May 2009

Olavi Juhani Mäenpää (29 November 1950 – 31 January 2018) was a Finnish politician and former chairperson of the Finnish People's Blue-Whites (Suomen Kansan Sinivalkoiset, SKS), a political party aligned with the far-right. He was born in Tyrvää, which later became a part of Sastamala. Mäenpää was a member of the City Council of Turku, his home city, from the beginning of 1993 until he lost his seat in the 2017 election.

In 2001 he was found guilty of inciting racial hatred on a column he had authored and was forced to spend 41 days in prison. In the 2004 municipal election Mäenpää received 2,208 votes, more than any other candidate in Turku. Mäenpää also appeared as a candidate in elections to the Parliament of Finland and the European Parliament, but was not elected.

In the 2009 European Parliament election Mäenpää publicly supported Ville Itälä of the National Coalition Party.

In 2010 Mäenpää joined the Finnish Freedom Party (later known as the Blue and White Front) and the SKS became inactive. After the Blue and White Front failed in parliamentary elections, Mäenpää became the chairperson of the political association Suomidemokraatit that tried to get registered as an official party but failed.

In 2017 the Turku court of appeals sentenced Mäenpää to seven months suspended imprisonment for forgery. This pertained to falsified electoral documents. The original sentence of the district court for Finland Proper was five months suspended.

Mäenpää died in Turku.
