= New Communist Party of Britain =

- Abbreviation: NCP
- General Secretary: Andy Brooks
- Founded: July 1977
- Split from: Communist Party of Great Britain
- Headquarters: London
- Newspaper: The New Worker
- Ideology: Communism; Marxism–Leninism; Stalinism; Anti-revisionism; Hard Euroscepticism
- Political position: Far-left
- European affiliation: INITIATIVE
- International affiliation: IMCWP
- Colours: Red, Gold

Website
- www.newworker.org

The New Communist Party of Britain is an anti-revisionist Marxist–Leninist party in Britain. The origins of the NCP lie in the Surrey District of the Communist Party of Great Britain from which it split in July 1977.

Opposed to Eurocommunism, the party was one of two original British signatories to the Pyongyang Declaration in 1992, after the fall of the Soviet Union. It publishes a newspaper named The New Worker.

== History ==
=== Origin and Formation ===
Divisions within the CPGB had emerged following the Soviet intervention to quell the Hungarian uprising in 1956 and the subsequent moves by the Nikita Khrushchev leadership in the USSR to denounce Joseph Stalin. The split within the international communist movement that eventually polarised between the positions of the Communist Party of the Soviet Union and the Chinese Communist Party (CCP) was not a major contributing factor and the groups that supported the CCP position had little support within the CPGB. French remained staunchly loyal to the Soviet Union though privately he opposed the Khrushchev line. What he did have in common with those who eventually left to form their own organisations was a common belief that the CPGB's policy, known as the British Road to Socialism (BRS), was a major revision of Marxist–Leninist principles and was essentially a left social democratic and reformist programme.

In the eyes of French and like-minded observers, the CPGB leadership under John Gollan used the Hungarian crisis and the denunciation of what Khrushchev called Stalin's "cult of personality" to weaken and divide the party as a whole. The British Road to Socialism, was first revised in 1957 - the start of a process culmination in 1977 which, for French, deprived it of all revolutionary content.

In 1966, the Daily Worker was re-launched as The Morning Star - French had been among those who had campaigned against this change. The CPGB leadership's decision to support the Dubček leadership in Czechoslovakia and oppose the Soviet-led Warsaw Pact intervention in 1968 that led to Dubček's removal widened the divisions within the CPGB.

In 1964 Labour returned to power after 13 years of Conservative rule but the new government under Harold Wilson pursued policies seen by many leftists as anti-union (including an attempt to introduce "In Place of Strife" compulsory arbitration), while in Northern Ireland the government was seen by many in the Catholic community as supporting its oppression following the collapse of the civil rights campaign. The Tories, under Edward Heath, returned to power in 1970 with policies even more unpopular with the British left, contributing to the largest number of strikes involving the greatest number of workers in British history. Miners' strikes in 1972 and 1974 featured widespread participation from the working class and other sectors. Heath was defeated in 1974 and in the eyes of many on the British left, the second Wilson government continued where it left off.

French and like-minded British communists saw the Wilson/Callaghan government of 1974–79 as implementing "class collaborationist" policies and felt this was becoming more obvious to the working class, but believed the CPGB was incapable of presenting a clear revolutionary perspective, and had no capacity to rally workers on a mass scale against the capitalist offensive. French and others believed that at a moment of profound crisis for social democracy, their party was impotent and unable to wage a struggle for communist policies.

It was during this period of struggle and change that the CPGB declined at an alarming rate. It became more isolated from the people than at any other time in its history. The decline in membership and Morning Star circulation accelerated. The Young Communist League collapsed, while the growing crisis in the party also affected the credibility of its leadership as formerly senior and influential members left its ranks. In 1976, four of the party's top engineering activists resigned: Bernard Panter, Cyril Morton, Jimmy Reid and John Tocher, who had all been members of the Political Committee. At the base of the party the crisis in organisation was even more clear. Thousands of members were no longer organised and many did not even pay their nominal 25p monthly dues.

Warring camps emerged within the party. Since the 1960s a secret faction known as the "Smith Group" and later as the "Party Group" had operated within the CPGB based around the theories of the Italian communist leader Antonio Gramsci. This provided the political base for the emergence of an open Eurocommunist faction in the early 1970s. The Gollan leadership sought to prop itself up by aligning itself with the Eurocommunist forces further to their right. Within that camp was an active faction that called itself the "Revolutionary Democratic Current".

On the other side, a group led by former CPGB student organiser Fergus Nicholson was emerging that later became "Straight Left"; while French's Surrey District committee refrained from faction fighting which would have led to disciplinary action.

But the crisis came to a head the following year in the run-up to the Congress in November. The Gollan leadership had redrawn the British Road to Socialism aimed at - according to its detractors - adopting a social-democratic platform that sought the respectability and acceptance of academic and intellectual circles. The hardliners claimed it was the party's entrance fee into the reformist and social democratic traditions of the official labour movement. The publication of the draft and the beginning of the pre-Congress discussion period led to furious arguments within the party - with the majority saying that the new programme was about building a broad alliance for revolutionary social change, though implicitly or explicitly agreeing that the proposals broke with the Leninist tradition.

The Nicholson group argued that all the opposition should focus on making a stand at the November 1977 Congress. French led discussions with Nicholson and he was ready to go along with this strategy. But when it became clear that the party leadership was going to strike the first blow by expelling Sid French and a number of others in the Surrey district the formation of a new party became inevitable. On 15 July 1977 the New Communist Party was established at an emergency meeting in London called by French and other members of the Surrey district committee.

The split from the CPGB was largely organised by the leadership of the CPGB's Surrey District, and occurred in July 1977. The split led to the NCP taking 65 branches, but only 2% of the CPGB's membership at the time (25,300).

It took a further six weeks to organise the production of a party weekly, The New Worker, and issue the first pamphlet arguing the case for the new party.

The NCP failed to take many members in key districts of the CPGB, such as London, Scotland and South Wales in the run-up to the November CPGB Congress. There, Nicholson's supporters were overwhelmingly defeated and the new draft BRS adopted. The Nicholson group continued to oppose the CPGB leadership in an increasingly factional way while claiming that French's move had undermined the overall opposition at Congress. But the opposition had no chance of defeating the draft. Even if French's supporters had been at Congress their numbers together with Nicholson's group were still not enough to defeat the leadership bloc's support.

Some 6,000 members had left the CPGB by the end of 1977 in a membership decline that would accelerate throughout the 1980s. But only a fraction of them, put at around 700, joined the NCP.

=== Post-Formation ===
Sid French became the first General Secretary of the NCP and Surrey became its strongest area. The first national chairman was Joe Parker, a full-time official in the National Union of Sheet Metal Workers and Coppersmiths (NUSMWC) until he retired in 1982. Joe Parker stepped down as Party Chairman soon after but remained an active NCP member until his death in 2004.

French died in 1979 and was succeeded by Eric Trevett. Trevett retired from full-time Party work in 1995 but remained on the Politburo of the Central Committee of the NCP as Party President, a post created in that year, until his death in September 2014.

Like the rest of the British communist movement the NCP from the beginning had to deal with what they saw as ultra-leftism and right-wing deviation. All were defeated at congresses over the years and many were expelled for factionalism. In the early 1980s an extreme pro-Soviet faction called "Proletarian" was expelled. In the early 1990s another small group was expelled which later formed the Communist Action Group.

In response to the August Coup, the NCP supported the removal of Mikhail Gorbachev, with Trevett arguing in a letter to the Morning Star: "the emergence of a leadership dedicated to communist values deserves our full solidarity and support".

The party's 'Vote Labour Everywhere' strategy was changed in 2000 to support Ken Livingstone in the 2000 London mayoral election, and this ultimately led to the biggest purge in the party's history. A vote at the central committee with a one-vote majority led to nine expulsions from the party of those opposed to the Livingstone decision for factionalism, and some subsequent resignations, including nine members of the central committee. The North West District was dissolved and altogether around 25 members were either expelled for factionalism or resigned from the party.

One of the NCP's better-known members was Ernie Trory (1913–2000), who founded the Crabtree Press to publish his political and historical writings. Three volumes, Between the Wars, Imperialist War and War of Liberation, all sub-titled Recollections of a Communist Organiser, cover unfolding political events from the Depression to the end of the Second World War.

The General Secretary is Andy Brooks, a founder member of the NCP and a member of the Central Committee since 1979. He had previously been international secretary, editor of The New Worker and deputy general secretary.

The NCP has never stood candidates in general or local elections and calls for support for the Labour candidates. This policy was amended in 2000 to permit support for independent Labour candidates with mass support and the NCP backed Ken Livingstone's successful bid for the London Mayorship.

The NCP is also a supporter of the Liaison Committee for the Defence of Trade Unions, a rank and file union committee supported by a number of left-leaning trade union leaders.

The NCP has been opposed to the European Union and the Treaty of Rome, and while the UK was still a member state it called on its supporters to boycott elections to the European Parliament.

The organisational structure of the NCP consists of Fractions, Cells, District Committees, Central Committee, and Political Bureau (Politburo). The highest body of the party is the National Congress, which determines policy and elects the Central Committee.

It produces a weekly newspaper called The New Worker. For the first two years the paper was commercially printed but in 1979 production became entirely in-house with the purchase of an off-set litho press. Content is written either internally, or comes from other sources, particularly organs of fraternal parties. It no longer has a theoretical journal, having ended publication of the New Communist Review in the mid-1990s following the death of its editor George Woolley. In the 1980s and early 1990s the NCP also published an Industrial Bulletin, Irish Bulletin and Economic Bulletin. It produces Internal Bulletin for members and supporters, as well as various pamphlets on different subjects.

The New Communist Party of Britain gave its endorsement to the Labour Party for the 2019 United Kingdom general election.

== Ideology ==
The NCP began internally to criticise Mikhail Gorbachev's leadership of the Soviet Union in 1988 and after the dissolution of the Soviet Union established relations with communist and workers' parties globally. In the 1990s Party Congresses adopted resolutions repudiating and denouncing Nikita Khrushchev's anti-Stalin 20th Congress speech (Secret Speech) and defining its ideology around the "great revolutionary teachers of humanity, Marx, Engels, Lenin and Stalin" and the "great revolutionary leaders of the struggling masses, Mao Zedong, Kim Il Sung, Fidel Castro and Ho Chi Minh".

In April 1992 the NCP was one of the initial signatories of the Pyongyang Declaration, along with 77 other communist, workers, socialist and progressive parties worldwide. Entitled Let Us Defend and Advance the Cause of Socialism, this was the first statement made by the international communist movement since the dissolution of the Soviet Union, and by 2007 has been signed by 300 parties.

In 2003 the NCP adopted an entirely new rule book with the aim of building a monolithic party and based on the principles of the old Communist International.

The party is politically closest to undiluted, orthodox or anti-revisionist communists who see the Soviet leadership from Nikita Khrushchev onwards as stepping away from socialism. Internationally it broadly supports Cuba, China, Vietnam, Laos and North Korea.

The NCP regularly attends the international conferences organised by the Communist Party of Greece (KKE), and May Day events organised by the Workers' Party of Belgium (PTB/PvdA).

In the UK the NCP has very close relations with the Revolutionary Communist Party of Britain (Marxist–Leninist), despite having major programmatic differences on the question of the Labour Party and how to engage with North Korea.

The NCP supports the Stop the War Coalition and has taken part in its demonstrations.

== See also ==
- List of anti-revisionist groups
- List of Communist Parties
- List of political parties in the United Kingdom
- List of participants at International Conference of Communist & Workers' Parties 1998-2005
