= Finnish People's Blue-Whites =

Finnish People's Blue-whites
- Finnish name: Suomen Kansan Sinivalkoiset
- Swedish name: Finlands Folkets Blåvita
- Leader: Olavi Mäenpää
- Founded: 1993
- Dissolved: 2010
- Merged into: Blue and White Front
- Headquarters: Previously in Turku
- Ideology: Finnish ultranationalism Anti-immigration
- Political position: Far-right
- Colours: Blue and White

Website
- www.kolumbus.fi/sinivalkoiset

The Finnish People's Blue-whites (Finnish: Suomen Kansan Sinivalkoiset, SKS; Swedish: Finlands Folkets Blåvita) was a Finnish political party with an ultranationalist agenda, led by the controversial political figure Olavi Mäenpää. It was founded in 1993 as Independent People's Front (Sitoutumaton kansanrintama), and was known as National Front (Kansallinen Rintama) from 1997 until 2001. The SKS became a registered political party in 2002 and lost this status in April 2007. In 2010, Mäenpää and his followers joined the Freedom Party and the SKS was dissolved.

In the municipal election of 2004, the party received 3.6% of all votes in Turku, with Mäenpää getting more votes than any other candidate in the city. The party subsequently attained two seats in the city council, but the holder of the other seat, vice-chairperson Timo "Betoni" Virtanen, was expelled from the party shortly afterwards.

The party's nationwide percentage of votes peaked (0.20%) in the 2004 European Parliament election. Well-known candidates were chairperson Mäenpää and Matti Järviharju, who had been the vice-chairperson of the Constitutional Right Party and later became the chairperson of another small party.

== Elections results ==
Parliamentary elections
Year	MPs	Votes	
1995	0	2,075	0.07%
1999	0	4,853	0.18%
2003	0	4,579	0.16%
2007	0	3,913	0.14%
Local elections
Year	Councillors	Votes	
2000	3	3,189	0.14%
2004	2	3,173	0.13%
2008	1	2,323	0.09%
European Parliament elections
Year	MEPs	Votes	
2004	0	3,248	0.20%
