= List of Communist Party (Finland) breakaway parties =

Since the founding of the Communist Party of Finland in 1918, the party has seen multiple splits and breakaway factions. Some of the breakaway organisations have thrived as independent parties, some have become defunct, while others have merged with the parent party or other political parties.

Year	Party	Leader	Status
1920	Socialist Workers' Party	August Raatikainen	defunct
1929	Left Group of Finnish Workers The group had supporters mainly in the southern industrial cities of Finland.	Niilo Wälläri	defunct
1986	Democratic Alternative	Kristiina Halkola	defunct
1988	Communist Workers' Party – For Peace and Socialism	Mikko Vartiainen	active
1994	Communist Party	Juha-Pekka Väisänen	active
1999	Workers' Party of Finland	Juhani Tanski	defunct
