= Communists' Party =

Communists' Party Partido de los Comunistas
- Abbreviation: PdelosC
- General Secretary: Rafael Castañeda Pineda
- Founder: Alejandro Gascón Mercado Rafael Castañeda O'Connor
- Founded: 2003
- Headquarters: Mexico City
- Ideology: Communism; Marxism–Leninism
- Political position: Far-left

Website
- www.deloscomunistas.org

The Communists' Party (Spanish: Partido de los Comunistas, PdelosC) is a Marxist-Leninist party in Mexico. Officially created in 2003 when the Mexican Communists' Party (Spanish: Partido de los Comunistas Mexicanos) and the Socialist Revolution Party (Spanish: Partido de la Revolucion Socialista, PRS) merged. Not to be confused with the historical and now-defunct Mexican Communist Party (Spanish: Partido Comunista Mexicano, PCM) and other present communist organisations.

As one of its major characteristics, the party proposes the unification of all the organisations within the “Abajo y a la izquierda” (“Downward Left”) political spectrum. In September 2003 the party became a signatory to the 1992 Pyongyang Declaration in solidarity with the Workers' Party of Korea and the government of North Korea. During the second National Congress of 2006, the party's Central Committee agreed to support and endorse the Sixth Declaration of the Lacandon Jungle as a formal adherent. It has been a strong ally of the Miners' movement in Pasta de Conchos, different struggles of indigenous peoples across the Mexican republic's territory and anticapitalist environmental efforts.

In present, the Communists' Party refuses to register in the National Electoral Institute (Spanish: Instituto Nacional Electoral), since the party's thesis deny any possibility of a deep anticapitalist transformation through the current official institutions.

== Secretaries General of the Communists' Party ==
- 2003-2006 Sergio Almaguer Cosío
- 2017-2024 Luis Alfonso Vargas Silva
- 2024-Current Rafael Castañeda Pineda
