= Proletarian (journal) =

Proletarian was a journal produced by a small far-left organisation active in the United Kingdom in the 1980s, which is generally also referred to as Proletarian. The organisation was known for its extreme pro-Soviet stance.

The Proletarian group emerged from a split in the New Communist Party (NCP). The NCP had been founded in 1977 by members of the Communist Party of Great Britain (CPGB) who disagreed with the direction that party was taking, perceiving that it had abandoned Marxism-Leninism in favour of social democracy. This was heavily linked to the NCP's support for the Soviet Union and the CPGB's more critical stance on that entity.

Proletarian consisted of a small group around Keith Nelson. There were members in London, Dorset, Brighton and Bristol. According to one source, it had about twenty members. Initially, they were not a separate organisation but rather a faction within the NCP. The faction emerged in 1981. They argued that the NCP's newspaper, The New Worker, should be aimed at raising the level of politically advanced workers. Specifically they looked towards CPGB which they believed was corrupt but had to be saved as it was the largest party for the politically conscious members of the working class. The leadership of the NCP, however, was adamant that the paper should be aimed towards ordinary workers.

The group was ultimately expelled from the NCP in 1982. It went on to produce a journal, Proletarian, centred on the aims that the group was originally formed for; that is appealing to the CPGB's membership base. Two issues were published, the first in 1983 and the second in 1984. Selected articles and correspondence was published in 1987. The specific political stance taken by the journal was a strongly pro-Soviet one.

The group dissolved in 1988. One reason appears to have been disagreements between Keith Nilsen, founder and leading member, and a number of members who accused him of not abiding by political committee decisions.
