= 2004 Finnish municipal elections =

Municipal elections were held in Finland on 24 October 2004, with advance voting between 13 and 19 October. 11,966 municipal council seats were open for election in 416 municipalities.

== National results ==
Party	Votes	%	Seats	+/–
Social Democratic Party	575,822	24.11	2,585	+26
Centre Party	543,885	22.77	4,425	–200
National Coalition Party	521,412	21.83	2,078	+50
Left Alliance	228,358	9.56	987	–40
Green League	175,933	7.37	314	–24
Swedish People's Party	124,011	5.19	636	–8
Christian Democrats	94,666	3.96	391	–52
Finns Party	21,417	0.90	106	–3
Communist Party	12,844	0.54	16	+2
Finnish People's Blue-Whites	3,173	0.13	2	0
Alternative League	2,257	0.09	1	+1
Communist Workers' Party – For Peace and Socialism	1,248	0.05	1	–1
Seniors' Party	1,242	0.05	1	0
Independence Party Union of Free Finland	1,228	0.05	2	–1
Liberals	1,016	0.04	1	0
For the Poor	799	0.03	0	0
Fatherland	337	0.01	0	0
Others	78,482	3.29	420	–60
Total	2,388,130	100.00	11,966	–312
Source: Tilastokeskus

== Pictures from election work ==
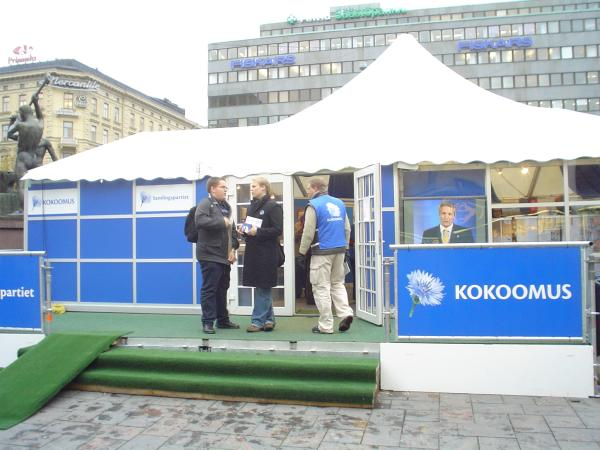
Kokoomus

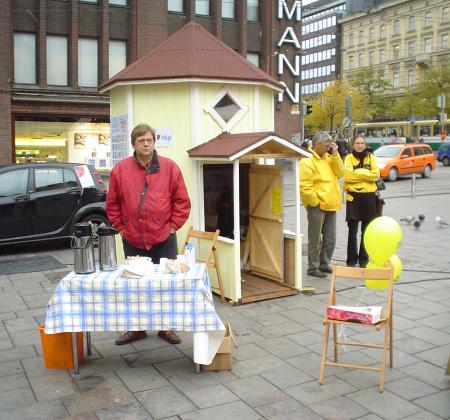
RKP

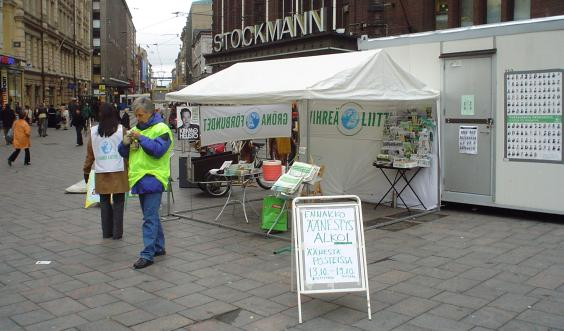
Vihreät

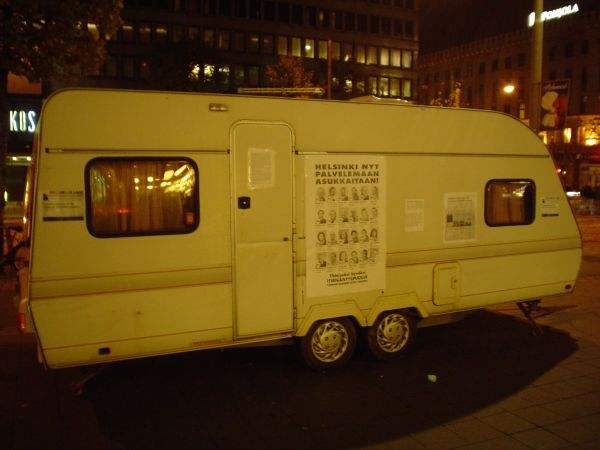
Itsenäisyyspuolue

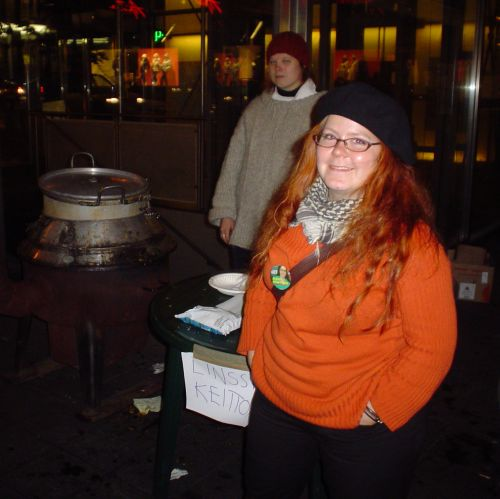
Young people worked on municipal elections and distributed lentil soup in front of the Lasipalatsi Palace in Helsinki at an event organized by the Vasemmistonuoret (Left Youth).

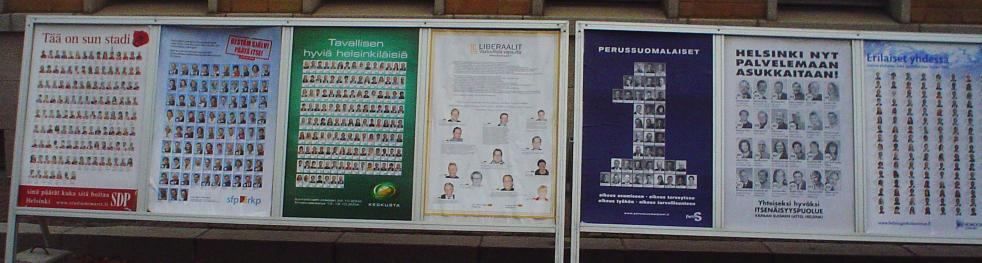
Election posters in the 2004 municipal elections

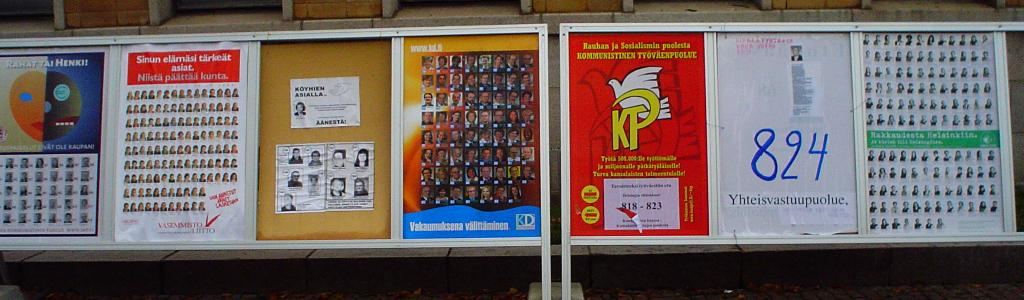
Election posters in the 2004 municipal elections
