= League of Communists (Finland) =

League of Communists Kommunistien Liitto
- Chairperson: Kalevi Wahrman
- Founded: September 14, 2002
- Split from: Communist Workers' Party – For Peace and Socialism
- Ideology: Communism; Marxism–Leninism; Anti-revisionism; Euroscepticism

Website
- www.kommunistienliitto.com

The League of Communists or Communist League (Finnish: Kommunistien Liitto) is a Finnish Marxist–Leninist political organization. The League of Communists was founded on 14.9.2002 by the Communists who were expelled from the For Peace and Socialism - Communist Workers Party (KTP). The organization was at first known as, plainly, Communists (Kommunistit) but the name was changed to its current form during the registration process.

The dispute in the KTP arose as part of its Central Committee wished the party would join a new electoral alliance party (Forces for Change in Finland [MVS]) in which right-wing organizations were also participating. The majority led by Chairman Hannu Harju did not approve of this and the Central Committee voted (18-9) against the initiative. The minority, including the Helsinki district organization, the main force behind the project, chose not to respect the decision, and it was expelled. The expelled Helsinki district later participated in the founding of the MVS. Some notable persons among the expelled were Heikki Männikkö (the party secretary), Reijo Katajaranta (the editor-in-chief of the KTP organ), and Pekka Tiainen (the 1994 presidential candidate). In 2005, the (former) Turku district organization of the KTP joined the League of Communists. Both parties adhere to traditional orthodox Marxism-Leninism and support, for example, North Korea as an anti-imperialist bastion. The KTP has, however, chosen not to cooperate with their former comrades whom they regard as revisionist traitors. The League of Communists has had to find their allies elsewhere. The MVS was no success and after the general elections of 2003, the league collaborated with several organizations, like the Communist Party of Finland (SKP) on whose list the League of Communists candidates stood in the elections to the European Parliament in 2004. The only elected local councilor of the league, Antti Siika-Aho, stood (in 2004) as a Left Alliance candidate.

As the new organization was set in motion, a newspaper, called Kansan Ääni, was also founded. The bimonthly paper, the editor-in-chief of which is Reijo Katajaranta, looks very similar to KTP's Työkansan Sanomat. Kansan Ääni is also published by two other organizations controlled by members of the League of Communists. These are the People's Front Against European Union (EUVKr) and Work Against War and Fascism (SFT), the latter of which was founded after World War II by former Communist resistance fighters.

Since its beginning, the League of Communists has been led by Kalevi Wahrman whose board includes only men. The organization acts like a political party although it is not officially registered as one, an option which, however, has not been excluded.
