= 2000 Finnish municipal elections =

Municipal elections were held in Finland on 22 October 2000.

== National results ==
Party	Votes	%	Seats	+/–
Centre Party	528,319	23.75	4,625	+166
Social Democratic Party	511,370	22.99	2,559	–184
National Coalition Party	463,493	20.84	2,028	–139
Left Alliance	219,671	9.88	1,027	–101
Green League	171,707	7.72	338	+46
Swedish People's Party	113,170	5.09	644	–27
Finnish Christian League	95,009	4.27	443	+90
Finns Party	14,712	0.66	109	–29
Communist Party	10,460	0.47	14	New
Communist Workers' Party – For Peace and Socialism	2,314	0.10	2	–1
Reform Group	2,119	0.10	5	New
Seniors' Party	1,428	0.06	1	–1
Alliance for Free Finland	665	0.03	3	–3
Alternative League	400	0.02	0	New
Kirjava ”Puolue” – Elonkehän Puolesta	11	0.00	0	–1
Others	89,276	4.01	480	+16
Total	2,224,124	100.00	12,278	–204
Source: Tilastokeskus
