= Blue and White Front =

Blue and White Front Sinivalkoinen Rintama
- Founded: 4 April 2009
- Dissolved: 2015
- Ideology: Ultranationalism; National conservatism Right-wing populism
- Political position: Far-right
- European affiliation: Alliance of European National Movements
- Colours: Blue and white

Website
- www.vapauspuolue.fi

The Blue and White Front (Finnish: Sinivalkoinen Rintama) (formerly Freedom Party – Finland's Future) (Finnish: Vapauspuolue – Suomen tulevaisuus) was an ultranationalist political party in Finland which was founded in 2009 and dissolved in 2015.

It was dissolved in 2015 after it had no elected MPs in two consecutive parliamentary elections.

== History ==
The VP was founded on 4 April 2009. In September 2010, leader of the Finnish People's Blue-Whites in the Turku county council, Olavi Mäenpää, joined the VP, and became the party's first city councillor. In November, Turku city councillor Maarit Rostedt of the National Coalition Party also defected to the VP, as well as former True Finns city councillor Kalevi Satopää in Salo. The party changed its name to the Finns Party in 2013.

The party contested its first election in the 2011 Finnish parliamentary election.

== Policies ==
The party called for a ban on the construction of mosques and minarets, removal of beggars from the streets and the reduction of foreign aid. It also opposed nuclear power and the mandatory teaching of Swedish.

== Election results ==
=== Parliamentary elections ===
| Election | Votes | % | Seats | +/– | Position |
|---|---|---|---|---|---|
| 2011 | 4,285 | 0.1 | 0 / 200 | 0 | ▲12 |
