= Andy Brooks =

General secretary of the New Communist Party of Britain

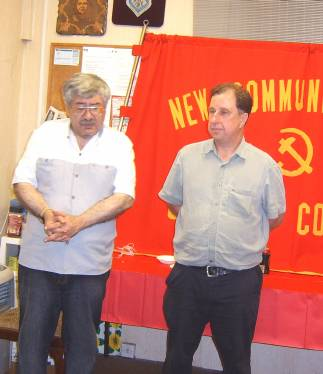
New Communist Party General Secretary Andy Brooks (left) speaks alongside NCP Chairman Alex Kempshall at an event at the NCP Party Centre in London in 2009.

Andy Brooks is the general secretary of the New Communist Party of Britain. He was formerly a member of the Communist Party of Great Britain, and joined the NCP upon its foundation in 1977. He has been a member of the NCP Central Committee since 1979. He had previously been international secretary, editor of the party's paper, The New Worker, and deputy general secretary before succeeding Eric Trevett as NCP general secretary in 1995. Trevett subsequently took up the newly created post of NCP president.

Political offices
Preceded by Eric Trevett	General Secretary of the New Communist Party of Britain; 1995 – present	Succeeded by Incumbent
