= Our Socialism Centred on the Masses Shall Not Perish =

1991 work by Kim Jong-il

Our Socialism Centred on the Masses Shall Not Perish: Talk to Senior Officials of the Central Committee of the Workers' Party of Korea May 5, 1991
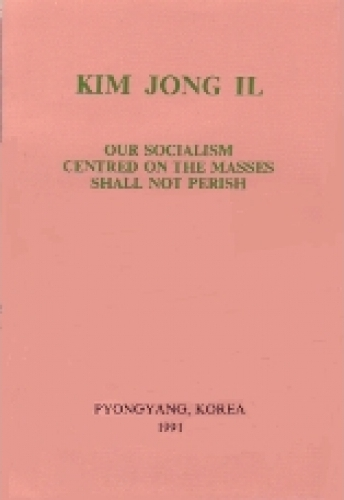
- Author: Kim Jong Il
- Subject: Socialism
- Publisher: Foreign Languages Publishing House
- Publication date: 1991
- Publication place: North Korea
- English publication date: 1991
- Pages: 45
- OCLC: 869091366

Today the imperialists and reactionaries are working viciously to wipe out our socialism, but our socialism continues to advance boldly along the path it has taken, without being swayed in the least by the enemy's dastardly attacks and slander. ... The secret of its durability and indestructibility is that it is centred upon the masses, that it has made the masses the genuine masters of society and that it has devoted everything to the service of the masses.

— Our Socialism Centred on the Masses Shall Not Perish

Our Socialism Centred on the Masses Shall Not Perish (Korean: 인민대중중심의 우리식 사회주의는 필승불패이다) is a 1991 work by Kim Jong Il. It seeks to explain that socialism in North Korea will be unaffected by the fall of communism elsewhere because it is based on the Juche ideology.

== History ==
Kim Jong Il gave the talk Our Socialism Centred on the Masses Shall Not Perish on May 5, 1991 to "senior officials of the Central Committee of the Workers' Party of Korea". The context of the speech was the then-ongoing processes of the dissolution of the Soviet Union, reform and opening up in China, and problems facing socialism in Cuba and North Korea. A few years later, in 1994, the premise of the speech that continuity of socialism in North Korea seems under jeopardy was further accentuated by the death of Kim Il-sung. Against this background, the speech was "a bold defiance of global historical trends".

According to Kim, North Korea will not be affected by the fall of communism because North Korean socialism is of a different kind. This, Kim says, is because of its rootedness in the Juche ideology. This makes it a more authentic, and thus more enduring, socialism. Considered authoritative on Juche, the work contains no reformulation of the ideology and instead restates what was by then a standard account of its contents. Its treatment of the subject is, according to Daniel Kalder, highly solipsistic. The work makes little reference to things that stand outside the framework of the philosophical system of Juche. According to Kalder, "practically every sentence contains a lie", like the assessment that North Korea has "the best of all social systems" that cherishes human life and guarantees human rights.

Kalder describes the work as unoriginal, part of a repetitive, self-referential "superspeech" of North Korean propaganda texts that is continuously generated. In this respect, he compares it to the works of Joseph Stalin. With Kim claiming to speak for "the masses" without actually giving them a voice of their own, Kalder sees a parallel with John Berger's social photo-essay A Seventh Man.

Although at about 45 pages it is a relatively short treatise, its prompt publication in a separate pamphlet form testifies that the speech is of importance to North Korea. North Korea used the work to tighten its grip on the populace by claiming that the United States was pursuing regime change by collapsing socialist states from within.

One theme of the work is multilateralism. It is one of the earliest works of Kim Jong Il that contains a discussion of it (dabangmyeonjeokin gyoryu, "multilateral exchange"). According to Kim, such exchanges are only possible with countries that consider North Korea their equal, have a friendly disposition, and can offer mutual benefits. This formulation has since become common in North Korean media. The message of multilateralism is particularly aimed at developing countries, especially those in Africa with which North Korea had already cooperated in the past.

It has been published by the Foreign Languages Publishing House in English, Arabic, French, German, Japanese, Russian, and Spanish. An English reprint is also available by the University Press of the Pacific.

== See also ==
- Kim Jong Il bibliography
- Pyongyang Declaration
