= Forces for Change in Finland =

The Forces for Change in Finland (Finnish: Muutosvoimat Suomi; Swedish: Förändringskrafterna i Finland) was a Finnish election cartel formed for the 2003 parliamentary election. It was founded in 2002 by six eurosceptic organisations, ranging from far-right and ultranationalists to hardline communists, and it opposed Finland's membership in European Union and NATO.

In the 2003 election, the party received a total of 11,485 votes, or about 0.4% of the popular votes. This was not enough for a seat in the Finnish Eduskunta, or parliament, and the party was disbanded after the election. The MVS did not take part in the 2007 election. It was removed from the list of registered parties for having failed to elect MPs in two consecutive parliamentary elections.
