= 2003 Finnish parliamentary election =

- 16 March 2003

All 200 seats in Parliament 101 seats needed for a majority
- Registered: 4,220,951
- Turnout: 66.71% (▲1.4pp)
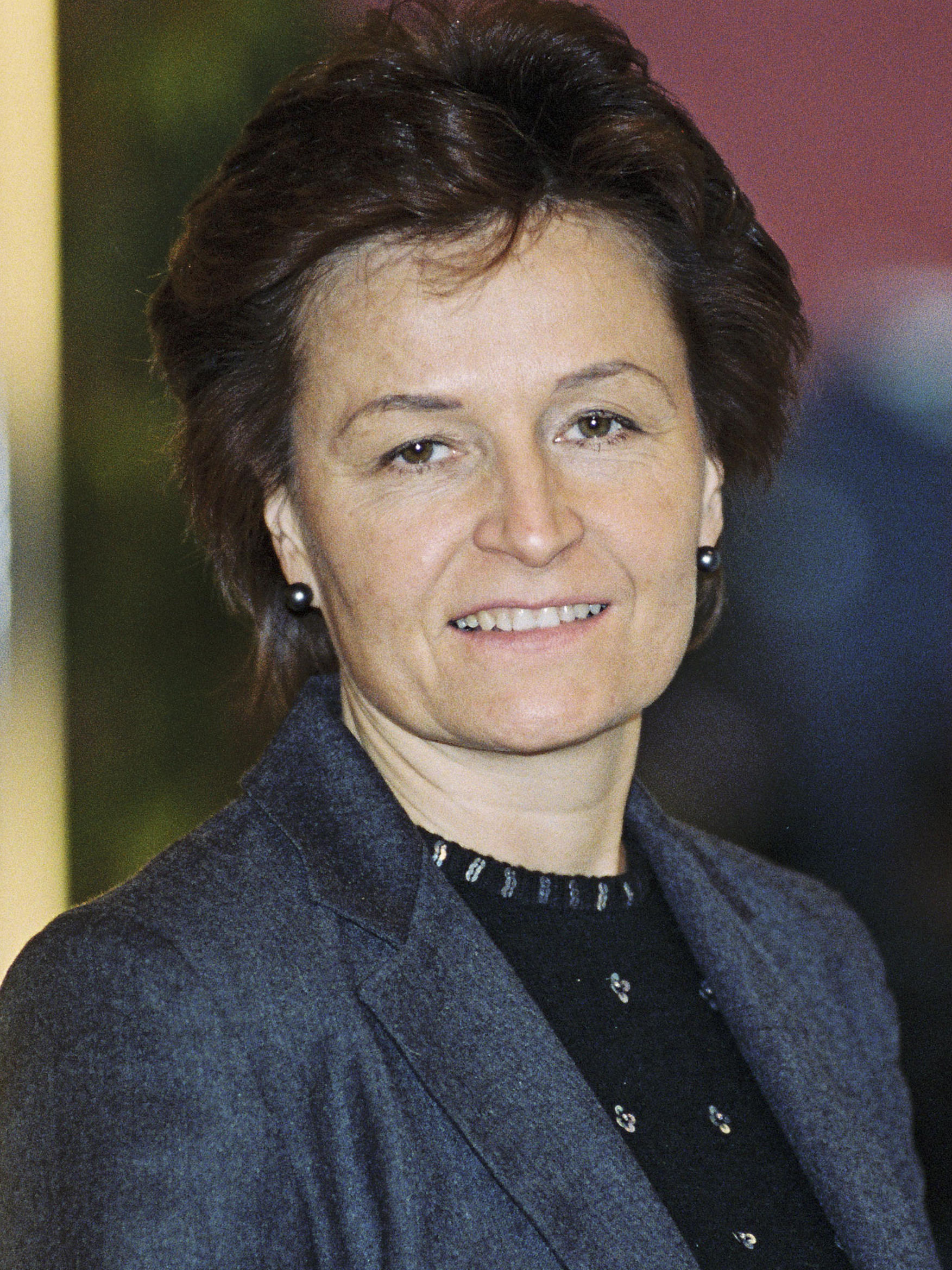

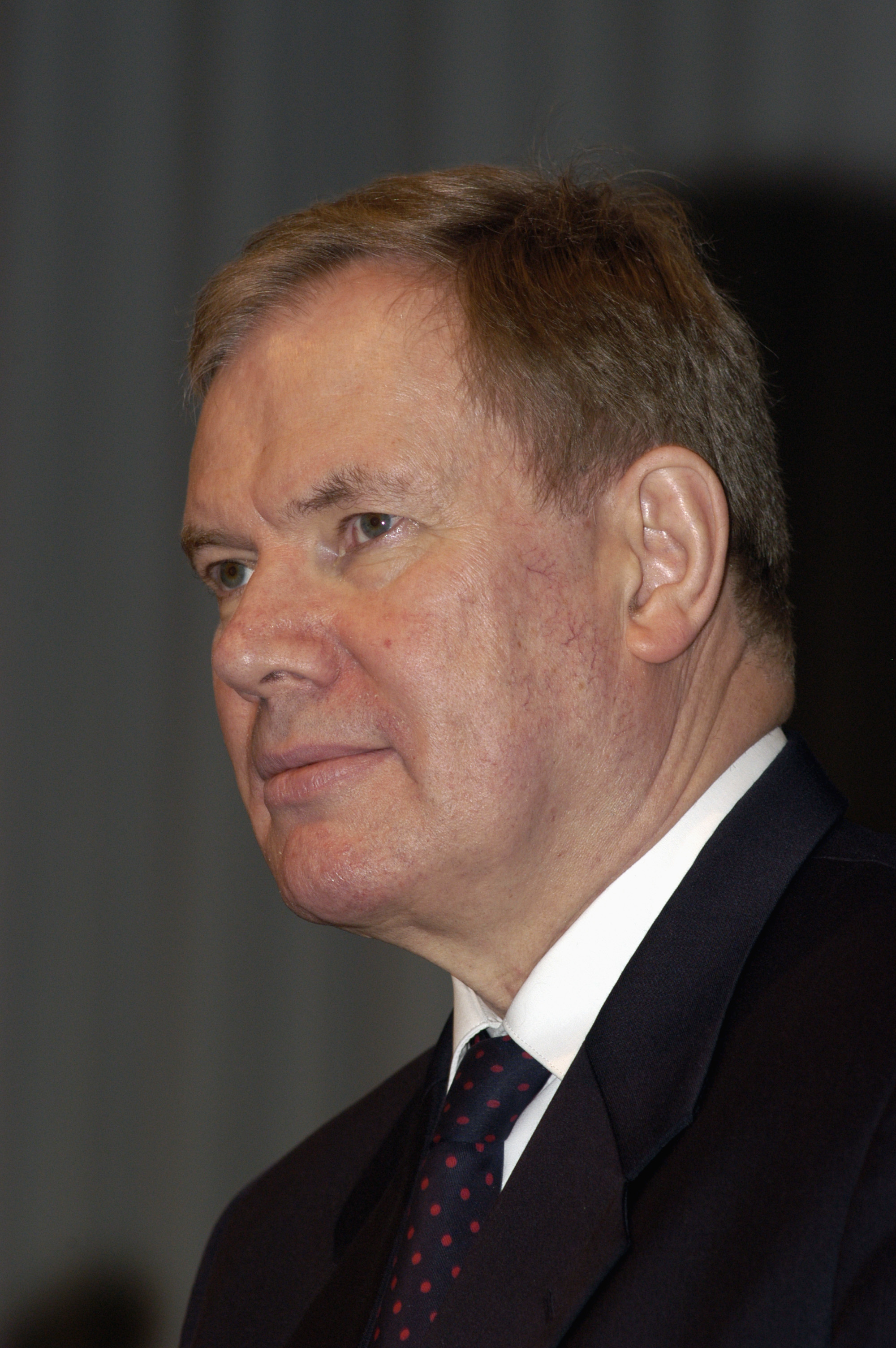

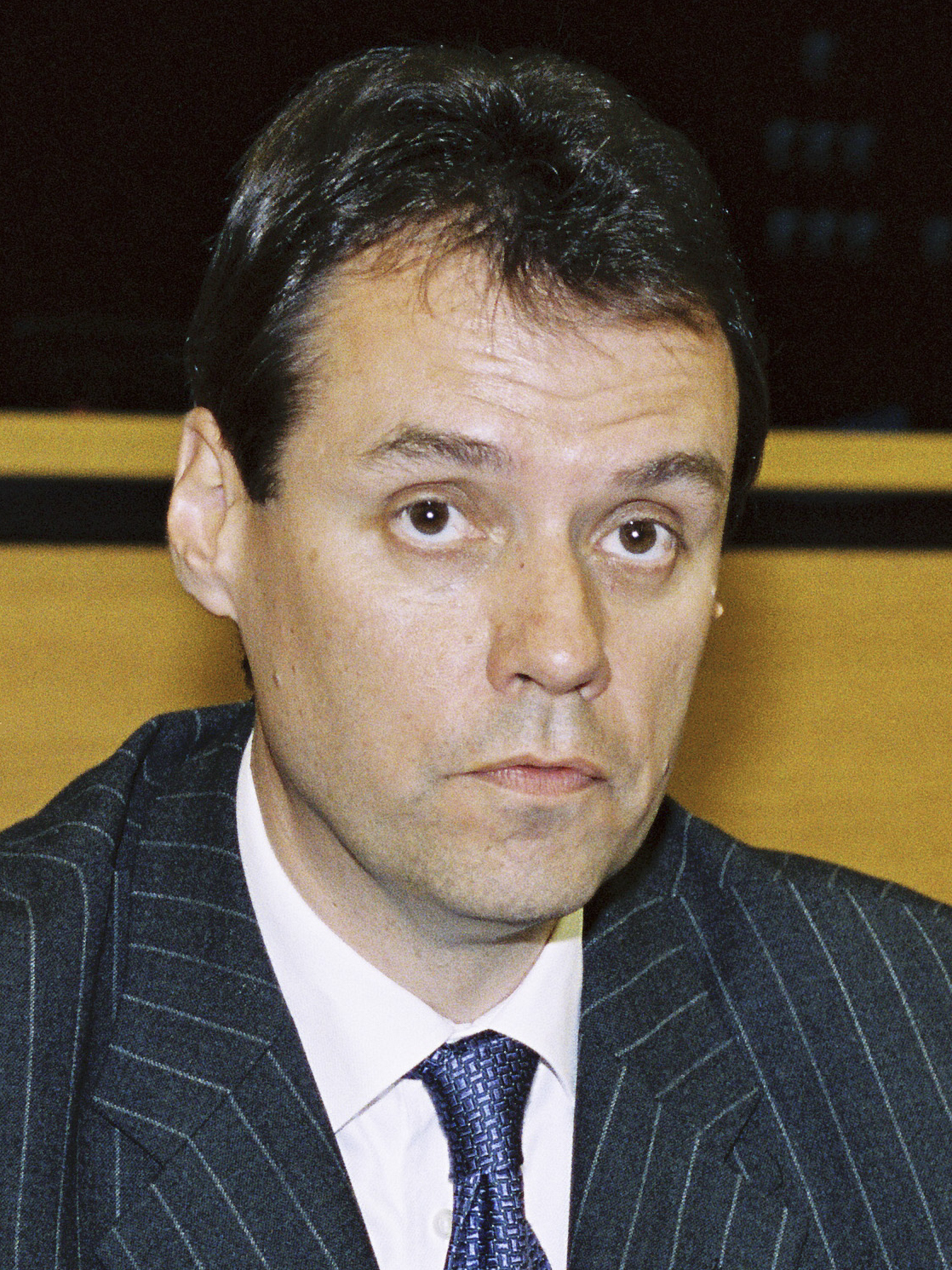

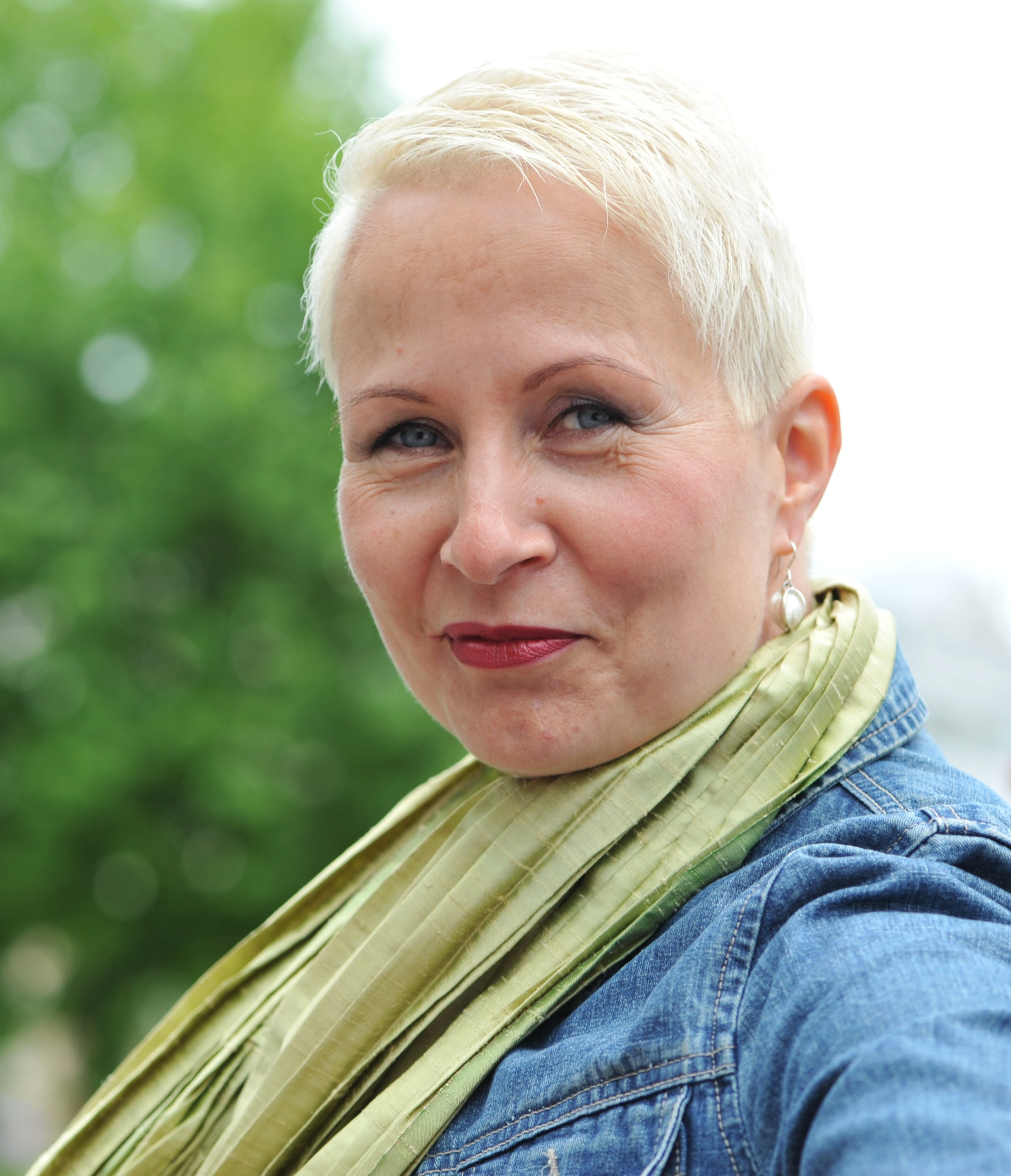

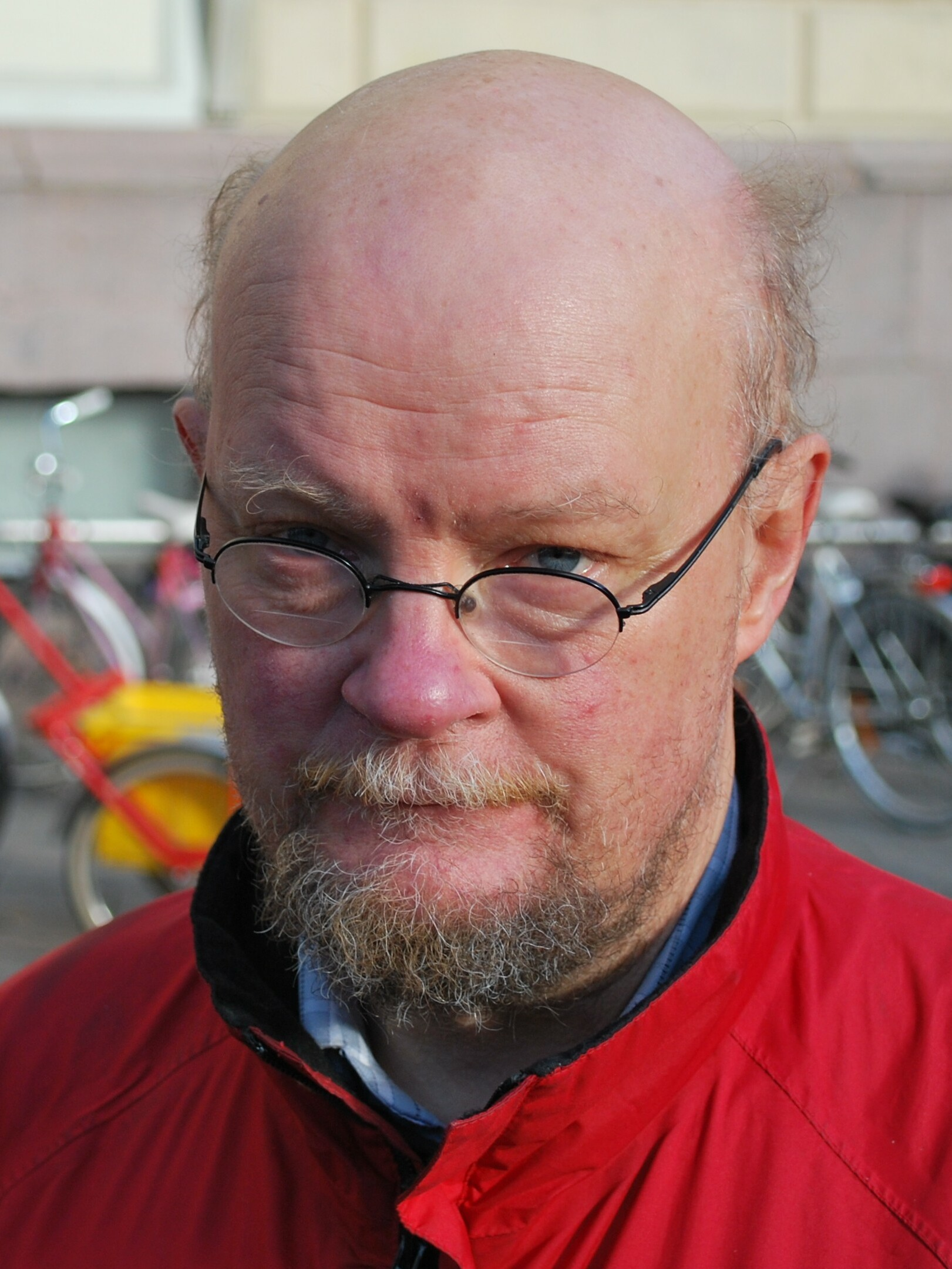

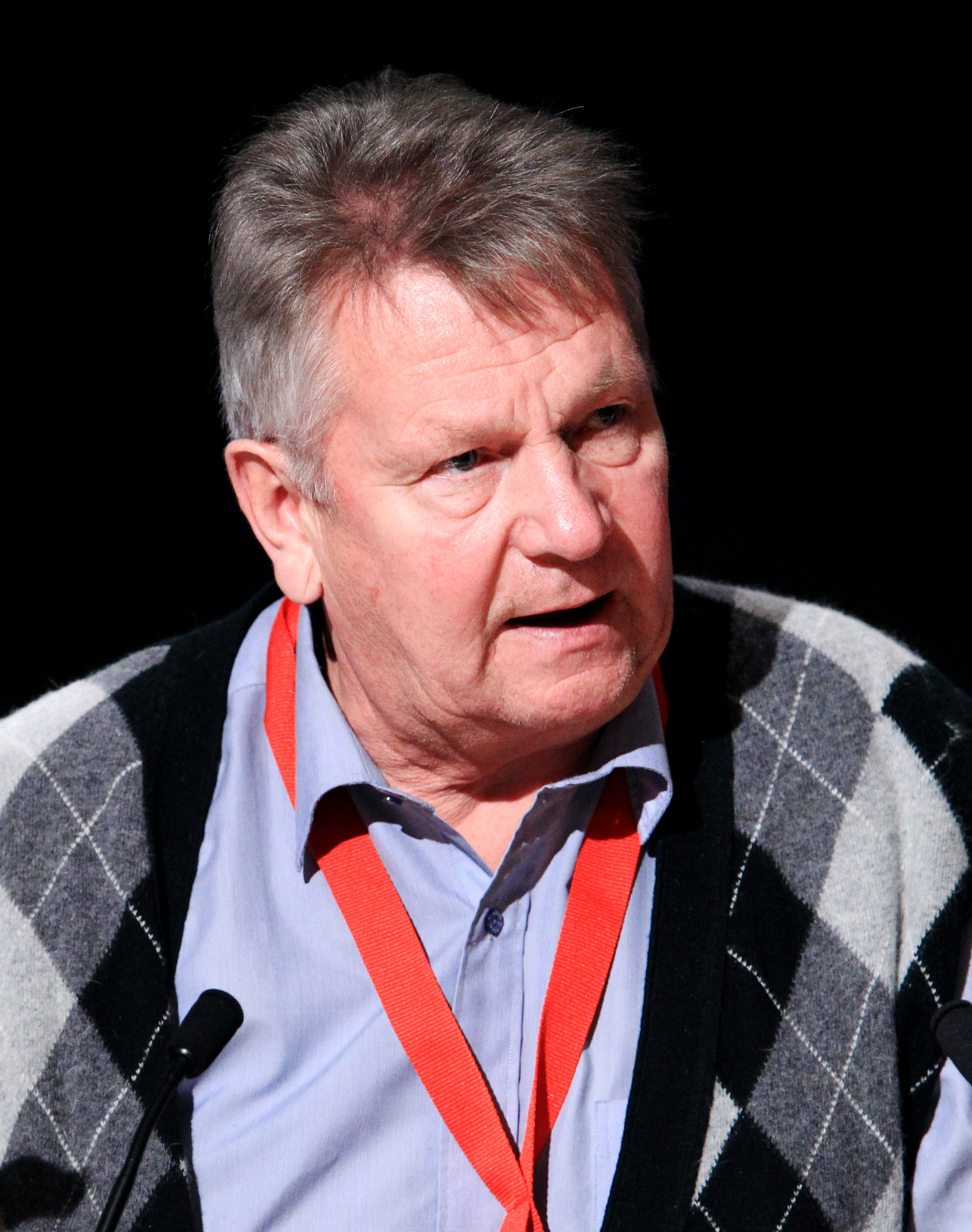

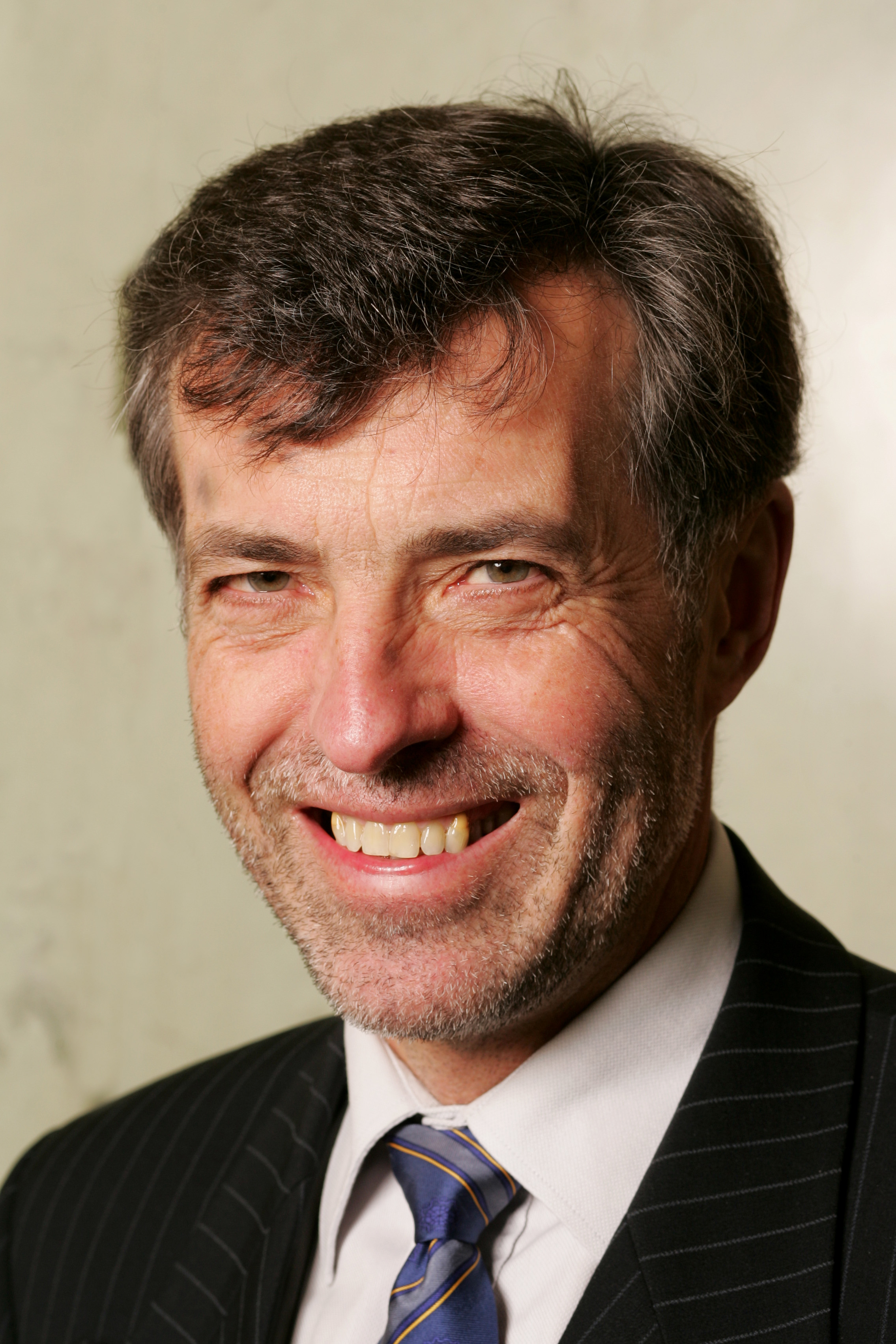

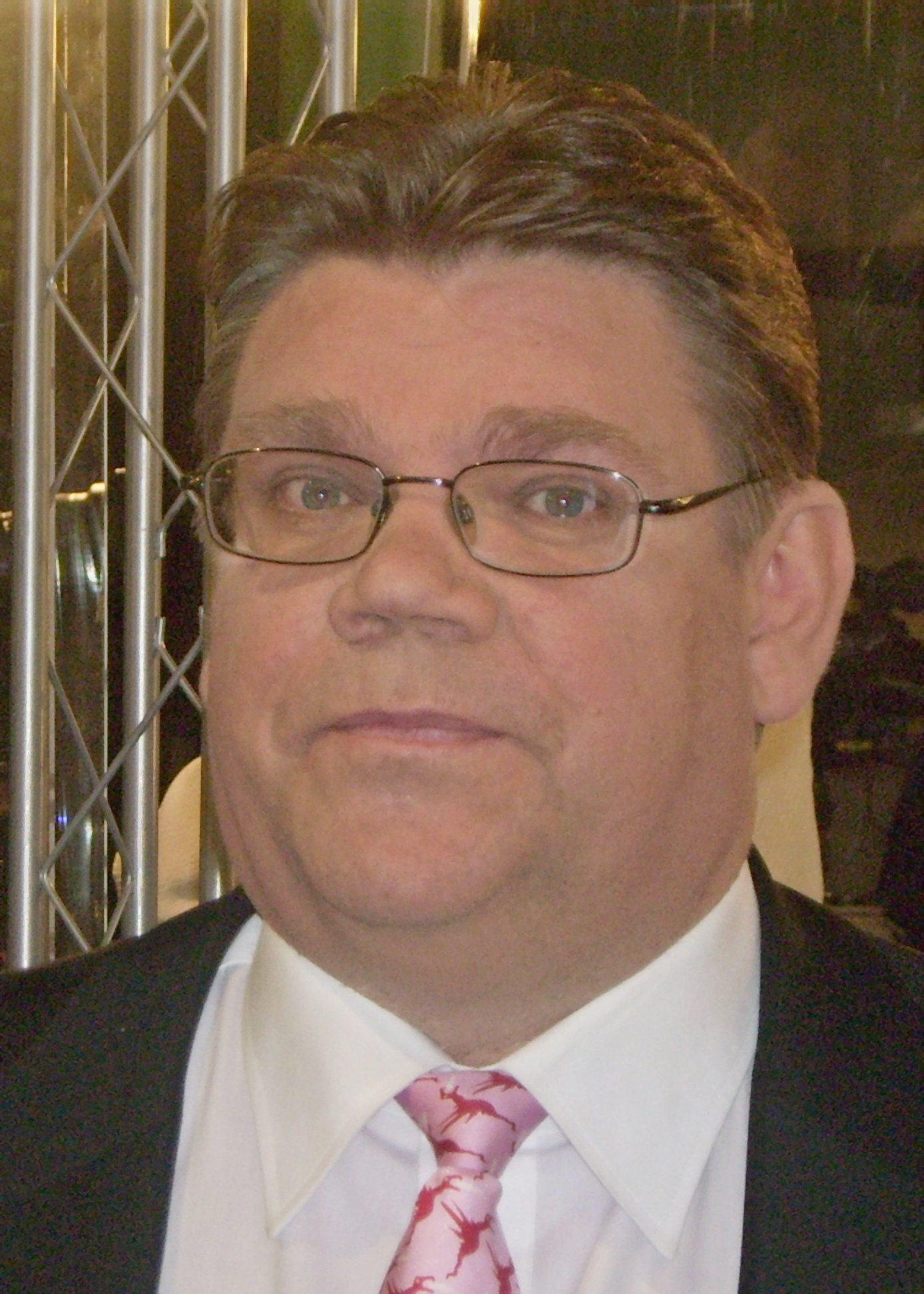
	First party	Second party	Third party
Leader	Anneli Jäätteenmäki	Paavo Lipponen	Ville Itälä
Party	Centre	SDP	National Coalition
Last election	48 seats, 22.4%	51 seats, 22.9%	46 seats, 21.0%
Seats won	55	53	40
Seat change	▲7	▲2	▼6
Popular vote	689,391	683,223	517,904
Percentage	24.7%	24.5%	18.6%
Swing	▲2.3pp	▲1.6pp	▼2.4pp
	Fourth party	Fifth party	Sixth party
Leader	Suvi-Anne Siimes	Osmo Soininvaara	Bjarne Kallis
Party	Left Alliance	Green	KD
Last election	20 seats, 10.9%	11 seats, 7.3%	10 seats, 5.34%
Seats won	19	14	7
Seat change	▼1	▲3	▼3
Popular vote	277,152	223,564	148,987
Percentage	9.9%	8.0%	5.3%
Swing	▼1.0pp	▲0.7pp	▲1.1pp
	Seventh party	Eighth party
Leader	Jan-Erik Enestam	Timo Soini
Party	RKP	Finns
Last election	11 seats, 5.1%	1 seat, 1.0%
Seats won	8	3
Seat change	▼3	▲2
Popular vote	128,824	43,816
Percentage	4.6%	1.6%
Swing	▼0.5pp	▲0.6pp
Prime Minister before election
Paavo Lipponen
SDP
Prime Minister after election
Anneli Jäätteenmäki
Centre

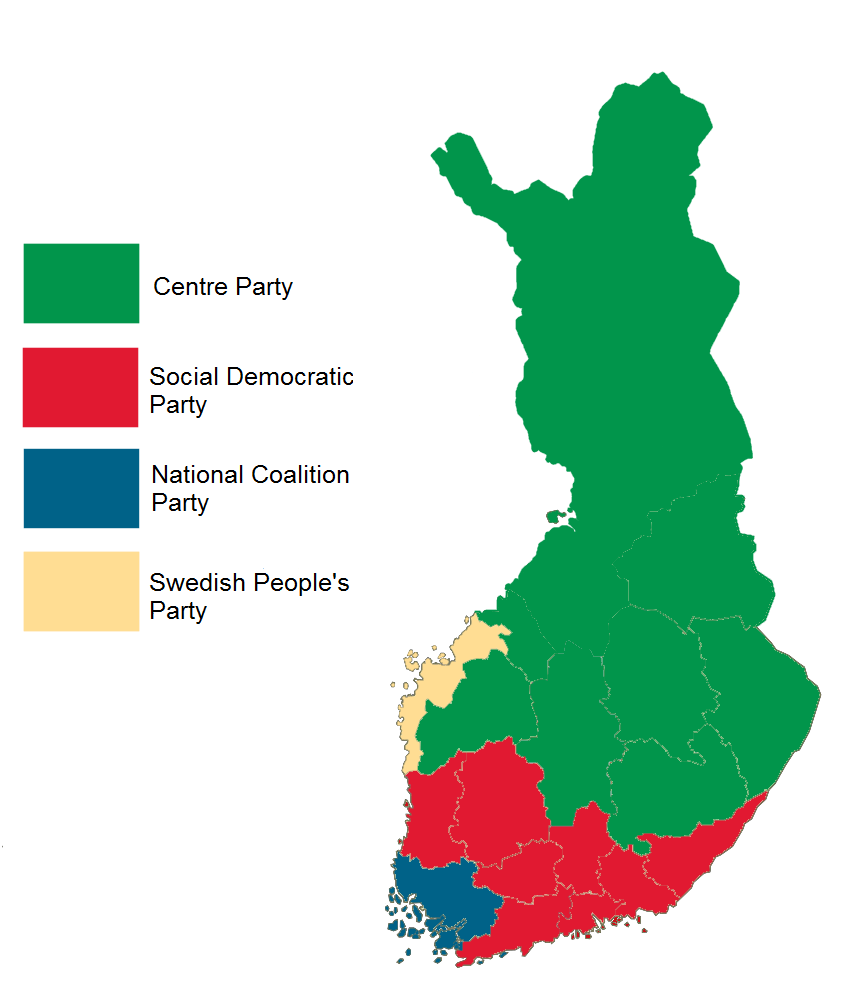
Results by region Centre Party Social Democratic Party National Coalition Party Swedish People's Party

Parliamentary elections were held in Finland on 16 March 2003. The Centre Party led by Anneli Jäätteenmäki overtook the Social Democratic Party (SDP) to become the largest party in the Eduskunta. This was credited mainly to Jäätteenmäki's powerful leadership and modernization of the party still often viewed as agrarian and conservative by many. However, the SDP actually won some seats and increased its share of the vote, losing in the number of total popular votes only by a few thousand.

The Green League achieved its best results ever, but the Swedish People's Party suffered losses. The Christian Democrats gained votes but lost seats. This was partly because in 1999 and before Christian Democrats had been in an election coalition with Centre Party and benefited from this, while the Centre Party had lost seats due to the arrangement, and thus discontinued it starting from 2003. The Left Alliance continued its slow decline, while the small populist Finns Party did not do as well as some had expected.

== Electoral system ==
The election was held under the d'Hondt method of party-list proportional representation, where the electoral district voted directly for the individual candidate, but each vote also benefitted the candidate's party.

The country was divided into fifteen electoral districts, with the boundaries corresponding to those of administrative regions (in some cases several regions have been grouped into a single constituency), with the exception that the city of Helsinki serves as its own constituency, instead of being part of the Uusimaa region in this case. Each constituency elected a number of representatives to the Eduskunta based on its population. The autonomous region of Åland had a special status with one representative even if its population was not large enough.

Candidates for the parliamentary election were allowed to be set by political parties and electoral associations. Any Finnish citizen over the age of 18 was eligible for candidacy, apart from incapacitated persons and professional soldiers. Each party or electoral union was allowed to set a maximum of 14 candidates per electoral district, or, in the case the district elected more than 14 members of parliament, an amount equal to that of the representatives elected.

Each Finnish citizen aged 18 or over on the election day had the right to vote in the election, no matter where they lived. The electorate consisted of a total of 4,220,951 people, 4,015,552 of whom were resident in Finland and 205,399 abroad.

== Results ==
Party	Votes	%	Seats	+/–
Centre Party	689,391	24.69	55	+7
Social Democratic Party	683,223	24.47	53	+2
National Coalition Party	517,904	18.55	40	–6
Left Alliance	277,152	9.93	19	–1
Green League	223,564	8.01	14	+3
Christian Democrats	148,987	5.34	7	–3
Swedish People's Party	128,824	4.61	8	–3
Finns Party	43,816	1.57	3	+2
Communist Party	21,079	0.76	0	0
Forces for Change in Finland	11,485	0.41	0	New
Liberals	8,776	0.31	0	0
Kirjava ”Puolue” – Elonkehän Puolesta	6,659	0.24	0	0
Pensioners for People	5,346	0.19	0	0
Finnish People's Blue-Whites	4,579	0.16	0	New
Freeminded Cooperation–Non-aligned Coalition	4,306	0.15	1	+1
Liberals for Åland	3,323	0.12	0	–1
Communist Workers' Party – For Peace and Socialism	2,908	0.10	0	0
Åland Social Democrats	2,904	0.10	0	0
Finland Rises – People Unites	2,640	0.09	0	New
For the Poor	1,448	0.05	0	New
Åland Centre	1,118	0.04	0	0
Joint Responsibility Party	404	0.01	0	New
Others	1,921	0.07	0	–
Total	2,791,757	100.00	200	0
Valid votes	2,791,757	99.15		
Invalid/blank votes	23,943	0.85		
Total votes	2,815,700	100.00		
Registered voters/turnout	4,220,951	66.71		
Source: Tilastokeskus ASUB

=== By region ===
Province	Centre	Social Democratic	National Coalition	Left Alliance	Green League	Christian League	Swedish People's	True Finns	Communist	Electorate	Votes	Valid	Invalid
South Savo	34,205	27,030	11,283	2,282	3,410	4,810	0	472	417	130,103	85,077	84,520	780
North Savo	49,301	26,906	15,425	15,429	7,399	12,093	0	851	1,106	197,514	129,585	129,081	906
North Karelia	33,026	30,639	8,498	4,326	5,767	3,798	0	635	837	132,484	88,225	87,824	666
Kainuu	22,756	5,217	3,201	10,142	1,063	1,731	41	222	291	68,445	45,093	44,958	313
Uusimaa	81,039	181,363	176,712	61,089	103,523	25,944	54,262	22,277	4,021	1,005,079	725,654	725,657	6,514
Eastern Uusimaa	6,037	12,459	6,041	2,802	3,285	1,198	14,977	328	159	68,350	48,491	48,304	455
Southwest Finland	43,552	61,367	64,823	26,515	21,250	9,597	13,081	845	1,615	351,346	248,253	248,369	1,995
Kanta-Häme	17,295	30,035	18,466	7,716	5,165	7,429	0	313	796	129,357	89,575	88,830	986
Päijät-Häme	17,464	30,254	22,671	9,044	6,251	10,996	0	605	749	154,705	100,639	100,024	1,022
Kymenlaakso	22,245	33,398	20,862	9,788	4,907	4,888	0	320	650	147,186	98,669	97,982	1,061
South Karelia	21,882	26,169	14,050	2,166	2,860	4,550	0	393	485	108,192	73,807	73,351	720
Central Finland	48,532	35,480	19,730	13,199	9,027	10,278	0	510	1,678	206,066	139,519	139,024	1,158
Southern Ostrobothnia	56,649	14,857	17,614	3,383	2,551	5,848	204	7,890	164	150,030	110,304	110,189	581
Ostrobothnia	9,348	17,670	8,987	5,597	2,574	8,542	42,889	1,491	275	132,208	97,508	97,794	734
Satakunta	36,238	38,369	21,662	19,330	4,492	5,908	0	1,926	280	186,492	129,822	129,087	1,166
Pirkanmaa	40,957	63,382	56,443	30,979	24,050	14,991	0	1,220	5,430	355,780	248,165	247,229	1,968
Central Ostrobothnia	17,589	6,512	1,882	1,836	824	4,941	2,837	1,858	216	53,322	38,683	38,656	306
Northern Ostrobothnia	85,580	27,384	19,148	25,462	13,014	10,601	312	1,496	1,571	274,057	187,443	187,297	1,377
Lapland	45,696	14,732	10,406	26,067	2,152	844	221	164	339	145,397	101,369	101,930	936
Åland	0	0	0	0	0	0	0	0	0	19,439	11,715	11,651	299
Source: European Election Database

== Aftermath ==
The Council of State, or the Finnish cabinet, was formed after the parliamentary election by the Centre Party, with its leader Anneli Jäätteenmäki as Prime Minister. A coalition government was formed, composing of the two largest parties of the Eduskunta, the Social Democratic Party (SDP) and the Centre Party, and a minor coalition partner, the Swedish People's Party, who has a history of being a partner in government since 1976. The new cabinet had eight ministers from both the SDP and the Centre Party, and two ministers from the Swedish People's Party.

However, this proved to be one of the shortest-lived cabinets in Finnish history, lasting only 69 days, after the Iraq leak scandal led to the government falling on 24 June 2003. A new cabinet was formed by the Centre Party's Matti Vanhanen, with largely the same composition as the previous cabinet.
