= Communist Workers' Party – For Peace and Socialism =

- Finnish name: Kommunistinen Työväenpuolue – Rauhan ja Sosialismin Puolesta
- Swedish name: Kommunistiska Arbetarpartiet – För Fred och Socialism
- Chairperson: Sanni Riihiaho
- Secretary: Tomi Mäkinen
- Founded: 1988
- Split from: Communist Party of Finland (Unity)
- Headquarters: Tikkuraiti 11 A, 01300 Vantaa
- Newspaper: Työkansan Sanomat
- Ideology: Communism; Marxism–Leninism; Anti-revisionism; Euroscepticism
- Political position: Far-left
- European affiliation: INITIATIVE (2013–2023); ECA (2023–)
- Colours: Red

Website
- www.ktpkom.fi

The Communist Workers' Party – For Peace and Socialism (Finnish: Kommunistinen Työväenpuolue – Rauhan ja Sosialismin puolesta, abbr. KTP) is a Marxist-Leninist party in Finland. It was founded in 1988 to secure the existence of an independent Marxist–Leninist organisation. Since it was founded, it has been re-registered and subsequently de-registered multiple times. Since its founding, it has failed to gain any seats in the Parliament of Finland. The party has been de-registered since 2019.

== History ==
The Finnish communist movement was split in the mid-1980s after years of infighting. Those expelled from the Communist Party of Finland (SKP) formed the Communist Party of Finland (Unity) (SKPy) which, however, itself soon split into different factions. KTP was founded in 1988 by one part of the Finnish communists who thought the SKPy had ventured too far from the principles of Marxism–Leninism. The final decision to find a new communist party was made in the autumn 1987 seminar held in Matinkylä. The Marxist–Leninists behind the project felt themselves neglected since the Dipoli Congress of the SKPy in 1986. Many of the KTP cadres came from the (expelled) Uusimaa district of the SKP which, since the late 1970s, had had its disputes with the opposition of the SKP led by the Tiedonantaja society.

In 2002, the KTP split over question of alliances possible for a communist party. The Central Committee of the KTP rejected after voting (18–9) a proposed membership in a new (electoral) party, Forces for Change in Finland (MVS), in which clearly right-wing elements were also going to participate. MVS was supported especially by the Helsinki district organization of the KTP which then decided to enter the MVS without their comrades. KTP answered by expelling the above-mentioned organization and many leading members of the party, including Heikki Männikkö (the party secretary), Reijo Katajaranta (the editor-in-chief of the KTP organ) and Pekka Tiainen (the former presidential candidate in 1994), all had to go. The communists that were expelled then founded their own organization, which was at first plainly called ’The Communists’, but later changed to League of Communists (or Communist League). The KTP has avoided contacting and doings with their ex-members.

The KTP got some unexpected nationwide publicity ahead the local elections in 2004 when the Turku and Raisio branches of the party made an electoral alliance with the anti-immigration party Finnish People's Blue-Whites. The KTP party leadership reacted strongly and condemned the manoeuvres. The alliances were, however, already signed and the KTP candidates stood in the two west coast cities with no success. The broader KTP didn't advertise their rebel candidates. The man behind the alliances, Esko Luukkonen, was discharged from all party responsibilities, and he along with the KTP Turku district organization later joined the League of Communists.

== Politics ==
The KTP's platform is rooted in the Soviet tradition of Marxism–Leninism. However, the KTP has included a critique of the revisionism of the former Soviet Union as part of party ideology since the establishment of the party. Lead members of the KTP have been known to quote Joseph Stalin and use traditional Leninist rhetoric. Party members have also rejected the idea of Eurocommunism. The KTP has shown support for North Korea, also known as the Democratic People’s Republic of Korea (DPRK) with KTP party members often praising the leadership of the DPRK's current governing body. Many of Kim Jong-Il's writings have also been published by the KTP, and the party members have participated in the Finnish Society for the Study of the Juche Idea.

The KTP has been strictly against Finland's participation in the European Union and the adoption of the euro as Finland's currency. KTP party members have been known to boycott European Parliament elections.

== Organization ==
The KTP holds party congresses in which the official delegates choose the members of the important Central Committee. Little change usually happens. The current chairperson of the party is Mikko Vartiainen. Vartiainen was preceded by Hannu Harju, who became the chairperson in 1997. Harju was preceded by Timo Lahdenmäki.

The KTP has been a small party all its history and it currently has some 200 members. The candidates of the KTP in the parliamentary elections have failed to get the attention of voters and the party has managed to gather only a few thousand votes. The KTP has had some local strongholds, like the city of Kemi in northern Finland where Pirkko Ezewuzie was a city council member until the end of the year 2008. The party, with its own candidate lists, has also participated in the elections of some trade unions and co-operatives.

The KTP has international contacts even though the party is not a member of any international organization. The Russian Communist Workers' Party – Revolutionary Party of Communists has warm relations with the KTP as well as the Nordic Communist Party of Sweden (SKP), Communist Party in Denmark (KPiD) and Communist Party of Norway (NKP).

Työkansan Sanomat (TKS), which appears fifteen times a year, is the official print publication of the KTP. The current editor-in-chief of TKS is Rauno Lintunen.

On the Helsinki area Lähiradio radio station, the KTP has a weekly program called Työväen puolituntinen.

== Electoral performance ==
Parliamentary elections

Year	Elected	Votes	Share
1991	0	6,201	0.22%
1995	0	4,784	0.17%
1999	0	3,455	0.13%
2003	0	2,908	0.10%
2007	0	2,007	0.07%
2011	0	1,575	0.05%
2015	0	1,100	0.04%
2019	0	1,240	0.04%

Local elections

Year	Elected	Votes	Share
1992	1	4,828	0.18%
1996	3	4,483	0.19%
2000	2	2,314	0.10%
2004	1	1,248	0.05%
2008	0	1,065	0.04%
2012	0	704	0.03%
2017	0	702	0.01%

== See also ==
- List of Communist Party (Finland) breakaway parties
