= Kansalaisliitto =

Kansalaisliitto Kansalaisliitto (Finnish) Medborgarförbundet (Swedish)
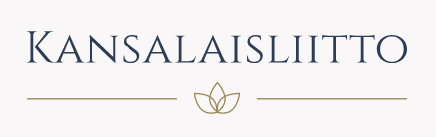
- Abbreviation: KaL
- Chairman: Arto Paajanen
- Secretary: Päivi Järnfors
- First deputy chair: Juho Tanila
- Second deputy chair: Terho Anttolainen
- Third deputy chair: Satu Immola
- Founded: 17 July 1994
- Headquarters: Laitila
- Youth wing: Independence Youth
- Ideology: Direct democracy Economic democracy Anti-racism
- European affiliation: TEAM

Website
- www.kansalaisliitto.fi

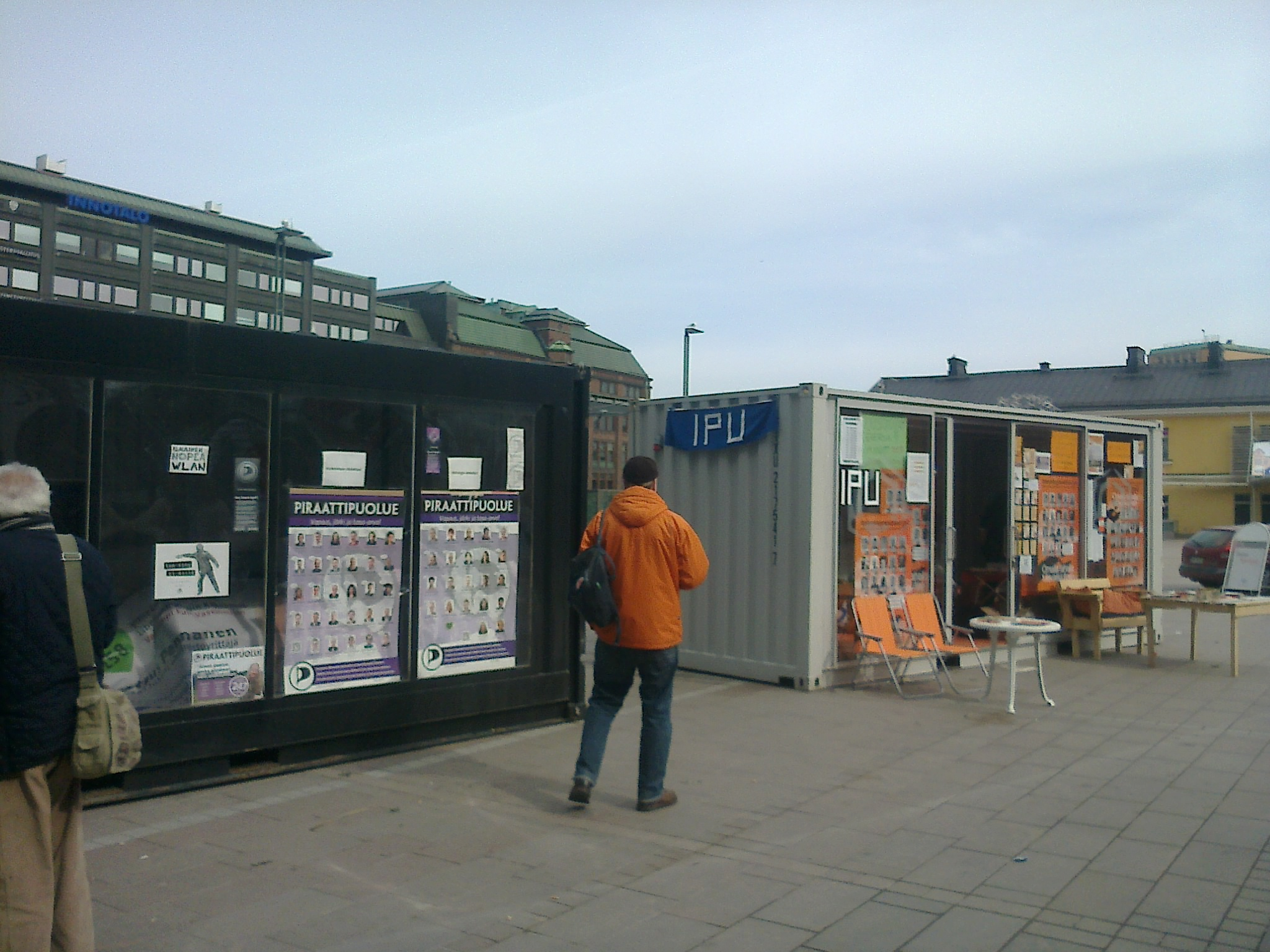
Independence Party campaigning in the 2015 Finnish parliamentary election

Kansalaisliitto (abbr. KaL; formerly Independence Party (Finnish: Itsenäisyyspuolue, IPU; Swedish: Självständighetspartiet) is a de-registered Eurosceptic political party in Finland. It was founded on 17 July 1994 as Alliance for Free Finland. The party supports Finland’s membership in the European Economic Area, however it is against its membership in the European Union and the Eurozone. The party opposes Finland’s membership in NATO.

== Party organization ==
Based in Laitila, Kansalaisliitto was a registered party from 1994 to 2023. Kansalaisliitto is a minor political party; it has never had any MPs in the Finnish Parliament. Its youth wing is called Independence Youth. The party is a member of The European Alliance of EU-critical Movements (TEAM).

== History ==
Kansalaisliitto was founded in 1994 as Alliance for Free Finland (Finnish: Vapaan Suomen Liitto, VSL; Swedish: Förbundet för det Fria Finland, FFF). Its chairman from its founding until 2004 was Ilkka Hakalehto.

Antti Pesonen served as the party's chairman from 2004 until his resignation for health reasons in 2015. He was re-elected chairman 2016, but resigned again in 2017 shortly before his death in April. He had previously been a city councilor of the party in Alajärvi. Henri Aitakari followed Pesonen as chairman.

Kansalaisliitto has been admitted into the party register four times, the latest re-admission having taken place in January 2017. Only Communist Workers' Party – For Peace and Socialism has dropped out and been re-admitted as many times. The party was de-registered again in 2023 after failing to win seats in two consecutive parliamentary elections.
