= Savo-Karelia =

Electoral district of the Parliament of Finland

- Savo-Karjala; Savolax-Karelen
- Electoral District for the Parliament of Finland
- Location of Savo-Karelia within Finland
- Municipality: List: Heinävesi; Iisalmi; Ilomantsi; Joensuu; Joroinen; Juuka; Kaavi; Keitele; Kitee; Kiuruvesi; Kontiolahti; Kuopio; Lapinlahti; Leppävirta; Lieksa; Liperi; Nurmes; Outokumpu; Pielavesi; Polvijärvi; Rääkkylä; Rautalampi; Rautavaara; Siilinjärvi; Sonkajärvi; Suonenjoki; Tervo; Tohmajärvi; Tuusniemi; Varkaus; Vesanto; Vieremä
- Region: North Karelia; North Savo
- Population: 410,237 (2022)
- Electorate: 343,887 (2023)
- Area: 43,981 km^{2} (2022)

Current Electoral District
- Created: 2015
- Seats: List: 15 (2019–present); 16 (2015–2019)
- Members of Parliament: List: Sanna Antikainen (PS); Markku Eestilä (Kok; Seppo Eskelinen (SDP); Sari Essayah (KD); Hannu Hoskonen (Kesk); Hanna Huttunen (Kesk); Marko Kilpi (Kok); Laura Meriluoto (Vas); Krista Mikkonen (Vihr); Karoliina Partanen (Kok); Minna Reijonen (PS); Markku Siponen (Kesk); Timo Suhonen (SDP); Tuula Väätäinen (SDP); Timo Vornanen (PS)
- Created from: North Karelia; North Savo

Savo-Karelia (Finnish: Savo-Karjala; Swedish: Savolax-Karelen) is one of the 13 electoral districts of the Parliament of Finland, the national legislature of Finland. The district was established in 2013 by the merger of North Karelia and North Savo districts. It is conterminous with the regions of North Karelia and North Savo. The district currently elects 15 of the 200 members of the Parliament of Finland using the open party-list proportional representation electoral system. At the 2023 parliamentary election it had 343,887 registered electors.

== History ==
Savo-Karelia was established in 2013 by the merger of North Karelia and North Savo districts. The municipalities of Heinävesi and Joroinen were transferred from Southeast Finland to Savo-Karelia in 2021.

== Electoral system ==
Savo-Karelia currently elects 15 of the 200 members of the Parliament of Finland using the open party-list proportional representation electoral system. Parties may form electoral alliances with each other to pool their votes and increase their chances of winning seats. However, the number of candidates nominated by an electoral alliance may not exceed the maximum number of candidates that a single party may nominate. Seats are allocated using the D'Hondt method.

== Election results ==
=== Detailed ===
==== 2023 ====
Results of the 2023 parliamentary election held on 2 April 2023:

Party		Party			Electoral Alliance		
Party		Votes	%	Seats	Votes	%	Seats
Finns Party	PS	44,961	20.04%	3	44,961	20.04%	3
Centre Party	Kesk	44,204	19.70%	3	44,204	19.70%	3
Social Democratic Party of Finland	SDP	42,903	19.12%	3	42,903	19.12%	3
National Coalition Party	Kok	36,692	16.35%	3	36,692	16.35%	3
Christian Democrats	KD	22,023	9.82%	1	22,023	9.82%	1
Green League	Vihr	12,701	5.66%	1	12,701	5.66%	1
Left Alliance	Vas	12,266	5.47%	1	12,266	5.47%	1
Movement Now	Liik	4,687	2.09%	0	4,687	2.09%	0
Freedom Alliance	VL	1,645	0.73%	0	1,992	0.89%	0
Crystal Party	KRIP	347	0.15%	0	1,992	0.89%	0
Liberal Party – Freedom to Choose	Lib	484	0.22%	0	484	0.22%	0
Power Belongs to the People	VKK	449	0.20%	0	449	0.20%	0
Pirate Party	Pir	325	0.14%	0	325	0.14%	0
Animal Justice Party of Finland	EOP	296	0.13%	0	296	0.13%	0
Communist Party of Finland	SKP	190	0.08%	0	190	0.08%	0
Swedish People's Party of Finland	SFP	134	0.06%	0	134	0.06%	0
Arto Lukkarinen (Independent)		50	0.02%	0	50	0.02%	0
Valid Votes		224,357	100.00%	15	224,357	100.00%	15
Rejected Votes		887	0.39%				
Total Polled		225,244	65.50%				
Registered Electors		343,887					

The following candidates were elected: Sanna Antikainen (PS), 7,720 votes; Markku Eestilä (Kok), 3,463 votes; Seppo Eskelinen (SDP), 6,975 votes; Sari Essayah (KD), 15,862 votes; Hannu Hoskonen (Kesk), 7,011 votes; Hanna Huttunen (Kesk), 5,849 votes; Marko Kilpi (Kok), 9,428 votes; Laura Meriluoto (Vas), 3,358 votes; Krista Mikkonen (Vihr), 3,972 votes; Karoliina Partanen (Kok), 7,172 votes; Minna Reijonen (PS), 6,687 votes; Markku Siponen (Kesk), 5,539 votes; Timo Suhonen (SDP), 6,510 votes; Tuula Väätäinen (SDP), 4,412 votes; and Timo Vornanen (PS), 6,474 votes.

==== 2019 ====
Results of the 2019 parliamentary election held on 14 April 2019:

Party		Party			Electoral Alliance		
Party		Votes	%	Seats	Votes	%	Seats
Centre Party	Kesk	50,459	22.78%	4	50,459	22.78%	4
Finns Party	PS	39,996	18.05%	3	39,996	18.05%	3
Social Democratic Party of Finland	SDP	38,274	17.28%	3	38,274	17.28%	3
National Coalition Party	Kok	27,699	12.50%	2	27,699	12.50%	2
Green League	Vihr	21,362	9.64%	1	21,362	9.64%	1
Christian Democrats	KD	17,389	7.85%	1	17,389	7.85%	1
Left Alliance	Vas	15,908	7.18%	1	15,908	7.18%	1
Blue Reform	SIN	4,128	1.86%	0	4,128	1.86%	0
Movement Now	Liik	3,425	1.55%	0	3,425	1.55%	0
Seven Star Movement	TL	769	0.35%	0	769	0.35%	0
Pirate Party	Pir	686	0.31%	0	686	0.31%	0
Citizens' Party	KP	616	0.28%	0	746	0.34%	0
Finnish People First	SKE	130	0.06%	0	746	0.34%	0
Communist Party of Finland	SKP	379	0.17%	0	379	0.17%	0
Feminist Party	FP	191	0.09%	0	191	0.09%	0
Communist Workers' Party – For Peace and Socialism	KTP	73	0.03%	0	73	0.03%	0
Independence Party	IPU	45	0.02%	0	45	0.02%	0
Valid Votes		221,529	100.00%	15	221,529	100.00%	15
Rejected Votes		1,240	0.56%				
Total Polled		222,769	65.48%				
Registered Electors		340,227					

The following candidates were elected: Sanna Antikainen (PS), 5,805 votes; Markku Eestilä (Kok), 3,035 votes; Seppo Eskelinen (SDP), 6,245 votes; Sari Essayah (KD), 12,397 votes; Hannakaisa Heikkinen (Kesk), 8,986 votes; Hannu Hoskonen (Kesk), 4,832 votes; Hanna Huttunen (Kesk), 4,162 votes; Marko Kilpi (Kok), 9,208 votes; Merja Mäkisalo-Ropponen (SDP), 8,248 votes; Krista Mikkonen (Vihr), 6,204 votes; Minna Reijonen (PS), 4,874 votes; Matti Semi (Vas), 3,468 votes; Tuula Väätäinen (SDP), 3,984 votes; Anu Vehviläinen (Kesk), 5,504 votes; and Jussi Wihonen (PS), 5,748 votes.

==== 2015 ====
Results of the 2015 parliamentary election held on 19 April 2015:

Party		Party			Electoral Alliance		
Party		Votes	%	Seats	Votes	%	Seats
Centre Party	Kesk	70,573	32.54%	6	70,573	32.54%	6
True Finns	PS	42,696	19.69%	3	42,696	19.69%	3
Social Democratic Party of Finland	SDP	34,629	15.97%	2	34,629	15.97%	2
National Coalition Party	Kok	24,980	11.52%	2	24,980	11.52%	2
Green League	Vihr	14,599	6.73%	1	14,599	6.73%	1
Christian Democrats	KD	13,578	6.26%	1	13,578	6.26%	1
Left Alliance	Vas	12,750	5.88%	1	12,750	5.88%	1
Pirate Party	Pir	1,269	0.59%	0	1,269	0.59%	0
Independence Party	IPU	705	0.33%	0	705	0.33%	0
Communist Party of Finland	SKP	639	0.29%	0	769	0.35%	0
Workers' Party of Finland	STP	130	0.06%	0	769	0.35%	0
Change 2011		277	0.13%	0	277	0.13%	0
Communist Workers' Party – For Peace and Socialism	KTP	55	0.03%	0	55	0.03%	0
Valid Votes		216,880	100.00%	16	216,880	100.00%	16
Rejected Votes		1,097	0.50%				
Total Polled		217,977	63.61%				
Registered Electors		342,671					

The following candidates were elected: Markku Eestilä (Kok), 4,578 votes; Sari Essayah (KD), 11,186 votes; Hannakaisa Heikkinen (Kesk), 10,712 votes; Hannu Hoskonen (Kesk), 6,633 votes; Seppo Kääriäinen (Kesk), 7,006 votes; Elsi Katainen (Kesk), 7,084 votes; Kimmo Kivelä (PS), 5,145 votes; Kari Kulmala (PS), 5,188 votes; Merja Mäkisalo-Ropponen (SDP), 4,899 votes; Krista Mikkonen (Vihr), 4,624 votes; Riitta Myller (SDP), 4,825 votes; Pentti Oinonen (PS), 6,283 votes; Sari Raassina (Kok), 3,978 votes; Markku Rossi (Kesk), 4,482 votes; Matti Semi (Vas), 2,140 votes; and Anu Vehviläinen (Kesk), 8,924 votes.
