= North Savo (parliamentary electoral district) =

Former electoral district of the Parliament of Finland

North Savo (formerly Kuopio) was an electoral district represented in the Finnish Eduskunta (parliament). Since 2013 it has been part of the Savo-Karelia electoral district. It covered the administrative region of North Savo, with a population of about 251,000 (as of 2002). North Savo currently elects ten members of the Eduskunta.

The constituency is largely rural, and the only major city in the area is Kuopio. The largest party in the 1999, 2003 and 2007 elections was the Centre Party.

== 2015–2019 members of parliament ==
- Markku Eestilä (NCP)
- Sari Essayah (CD)
- Hannakaisa Heikkinen (Centre)
- Hannu Hoskonen (Centre)
- Elsi Katainen (Centre)
- Kimmo Kivelä (Finns)
- Kari Kulmala (Finns)
- Seppo Kääriäinen (Centre)
- Krista Mikkonen (Greens)
- Riitta Myller (SDP)
- Merja Mäkisalo-Ropponen (SDP)
- Pentti Oinonen (Finns)
- Sari Raassina (NCP)
- Markku Rossi (Centre)
- Matti Semi (Left)
- Anu Vehviläinen (Centre)

== 2019–2023 members of parliament ==
- Sanna Antikainen (Finns)
- Markku Eestilä (NCP)
- Seppo Eskelinen (SDP)
- Sari Essayah (CD)
- Hannakaisa Heikkinen (Centre)
- Hannu Hoskonen (Centre)
- Hanna Huttunen (Centre)
- Marko Kilpi (NCP)
- Krista Mikkonen (Greens)
- Merja Mäkisalo-Ropponen (SDP)
- Minna Reijonen (Finns)
- Matti Semi (Left)
- Anu Vehviläinen (Centre)
- Tuula Väätäinen (SDP)
- Jussi Wihonen (Finns)

== Current members of parliament 2007– ==
- Hannakaisa Heikkinen (Kesk.)
- Elsi Katainen (Kesk.)
- Jyrki Katainen (Kok.)
- Kari Kärkkäinen (KD)
- Seppo Kääriäinen (Kesk.)
- Pentti Oinonen (PS)
- Kari Rajamäki (SDP)
- Markku Rossi (Kesk.)
- Erkki Virtanen (Vas)
- Tuula Väätäinen (SDP)
- KD = Christian Democrats
- Kesk. = Centre
- Kok. = National Coalition
- PS = True Finns
- SDP = Social Democrats
- Vas. = Left Alliance

== Old election results ==
Finnish parliamentary election, 2003
Party	Seats	Net gain/loss	Seats %	Votes %	Votes	+/−
Centre	4	0	40.0	38.2	49,301	+2.5%
SDP	2	0	21.0	20.8	26,906	+1.2%
Left Alliance	2	+1	20.0	12.0	15,429	-2.1%
National Coalition	1	-1	10.0	11.9	15,425	-4.1%
KD	1	0	10.0	9.4	12,093	+4.9%
Green	0	0	0.0	5.7	7,399	+1.1%
Other Groups	0	0	0.0	2.0	2,528	n/a

== See also ==
- Electoral districts of Finland
