= LGBTQ rights in Finland =

- Location of Finland (dark green) – in Europe (light green & dark grey) – in the European Union (light green) – [Legend]
- Legal status: Legal since 1971, age of consent equalized in 1999
- Gender identity: Transgender individuals can change sex by self-determination since 2023
- Military: LGBTQ people allowed to serve openly
- Discrimination protections: Sexual orientation and gender identity protections

Family rights
- Recognition of relationships: Same-sex marriage since 2017
- Adoption: Full adoption rights since 2017

Lesbian, gay, bisexual, transgender, and queer rights in Finland are among the most advanced in the world. Both male and female same-sex sexual activity have been legal in Finland since 1971 with "promotion" thereof decriminalized and the age of consent equalized in 1999. Homosexuality was declassified as an illness in 1981. Discrimination based on sexual orientation in areas such as employment, the provision of goods and services, etc., was criminalized in 1995 and discrimination based on gender identity in 2005.

Same-sex marriage and joint adoption by same-sex couples were approved by the Finnish Parliament in 2014, and the law took effect on 1 March 2017. Previously, Finland had allowed registered partnerships between 2002 and 2017, which gave same-sex couples the same rights as married couples except for adoption and a joint surname. Lesbian couples have been able to access in vitro fertilization (IVF) since 2007, and stepchild adoption became possible for same-sex couples in 2009. Transgender individuals who are residents of Finland and also over the age of 18 years old, can legally change sex on documents and forms (i.e. on a birth certificate) - by way of self-determination, effective from April 3, 2023, with enacted legislation passed and signed formally both by the Parliament and the President respectively.

Finland is often referred to as one of the world's most LGBTQ-friendly countries and public acceptance of LGBTQ people and same-sex relationships is high. 2019 polling from the Eurobarometer showed that 80% of Finns believed gay, lesbian and bisexual people should enjoy the same rights as heterosexual people, and 76% supported same-sex marriage.

In 2020, Finland revised its clinical recommendations for the treatment of gender dysphoria under the age of 25, restricting medical treatments such as puberty blockers and hormone treatment in favor of psychiatric treatment more broadly.

== Legality of same-sex sexual activity ==
Homosexuality has been decriminalized since 1971, and was declassified as an illness in 1981, around the same time as in other European countries. The age of consent was equalized to 16 in 1999. Transvestism was declassified as an illness in 2011.

== Recognition of same-sex relationships ==
=== 2000s ===
Registered partnerships (Finnish: rekisteröity parisuhde; Swedish: registrerat partnerskap) in Finland were created for same-sex couples in 2002. The legislation, granting similar rights and responsibilities to same-sex couples as to married opposite-sex couples, was passed by the Parliament in September 2001 with a vote of 99–84. In May 2009, the Parliament revised the law allowing couples to adopt the biological children of their partner. Registered partnerships, which were available only to same-sex couples, were registered and dissolved using a procedure similar to that for civil marriages. The legislation also granted immigration rights to a same-sex foreign partner of a Finnish citizen. The registered partnership law was repealed on 1 March 2017 after same-sex marriage legislation came into effect.

According to a survey conducted by the newspaper Kotimaa on 11 March 2010, the 2007 parliamentary election resulted in a split on the issue of same-sex marriage, with 54% of MPs opposing a gender-neutral marriage law and 46% supporting. However, four of the eight parties in the Parliament — the Social Democrats, the Greens, the Left Alliance, and the Swedish People's Party — had declared their support for same-sex marriage in their general position papers. The National Coalition voted to support same-sex marriage at its party conference in June 2010, though vice-chairman of its parliamentary group Ben Zyskowicz said that a majority of NCP MPs were against it. The Centre Party had no general position on same-sex marriage, though it opposed adoption rights for same-sex couples. The Christian Democrats, and the True Finns took a negative stance on same-sex marriage in their electoral platforms.

=== 2010s ===
Based on support by five of the eight parties in the Parliament elected in 2007, it was considered possible that same-sex marriage would be legalized after the 2011 parliamentary elections. It was speculated that the issue of same-sex marriage would be a major theme, however, in an August 2010 survey by Yle, only 20% of the respondents said the issue should be a major theme. According to the voting advice application of Helsingin Sanomat, 90 MPs of the 200-seat Parliament elected in 2011 supported same-sex couples' eligibility for adoption, while 93 MPs opposed it. As a result of the Christian Democratic inclusion in the cabinet – the Christian Democrats' chairperson, Päivi Räsänen, became the Minister of the Interior – a bill legalizing same-sex marriage was not included in the government platform. However, according to the Left Alliance, it was agreed upon during negotiations on government formation that, if proposed by individual MPs, such a bill would be endorsed by all the other parties in the Government Coalition (the National Coalition, the Social Democrats, the Left Alliance, the Green League and the Swedish People's Party).

A work group for the bill, headed by National Coalition MP Lasse Männistö, was soon launched and began operating in September 2011. A bill was subsequently presented to the Finnish Parliament on 8 February 2012, with 76 of the 199 voting MPs indicating their support. The bill received full support from the Left Alliance and ex-Left Alliance MPs (12 and 2, respectively) and the Greens (10), while it enjoyed majority support within the Social Democrats (30–12) and the Swedish People's Party (7–3). Meanwhile, the marriage bill enjoyed minority support within the National Coalition (14–30) and very little support from the centre (1–34), while no MPs from either the True Finns nor the Christian Democrats voiced support. According to state broadcaster Yle, the bill had a reduced chance of passing because it was submitted as a private member's bill and, therefore, had to have at least 100 signatories in order to qualify for the preparation process in a parliamentary committee – as opposed to a government proposal which goes directly to a committee and to a vote in a parliamentary plenary session.

On 27 February 2013, the bill was voted down by the Legal Affairs Committee in a 9–8 vote. Prior to the rejection, proponents of the bill accused the committee chair, Anne Holmlund (who personally opposed the bill), of delaying the process. Holmlund denied this, pointing to a number of government proposals and bills with over 100 signatory MPs which have precedence under the procedural rules. Finns Party MP Arja Juvonen, who had been expected to be more pro-gay than her predecessor on the committee (Johanna Jurva), also accused the Greens, the Social Democrats and the Left Alliance of pressuring her to endorse the bill against the Finns Party's group decision. An amendment to the Finnish Constitution passed on 1 March 2012 allows for citizens' initiatives with at least 50,000 valid signatories to be considered by the Parliament. As such, a civil campaign called "Tahdon2013" ("I do 2013") quickly gathered pace and collected the necessary signatures for the bill by 19 March 2013, gathering over 100,000 online signatures on the first day alone. In total, the initiative was backed by over 166,000 by its deadline, 19 September, and was submitted to the Parliament in December 2013. The bill was put for introductory debate (lähetekeskustelu) in plenary session on 20 February 2014, after which it was referred to the Legal Affairs Committee. On 25 June, the bill was rejected by the Legal Affairs Committee by a vote of 10–6. The Committee recommended that Parliament reject the bill. Two members were not present, though both apologized for being absent and stated that it would have failed on a 9–8 count if everyone had attended.

On 28 November 2014, the Finnish Parliament voted 105–92 to reject the Legal Affairs Committee's recommendation. The legalisation was then approved 101–90 by the Parliament on 12 December, making it the first citizens' initiative to be passed by Parliament. It was signed into law by President Sauli Niinistö on 20 February 2015. Finnish Prime Minister Alexander Stubb showed support for the bill, boosting it as "a prime example of citizen power." Following a number of legislative follow-ups, the law allowing same-sex marriage went into effect on 1 March 2017, making Finland the 12th European nation to legalise same-sex marriage.

== Adoption and family planning ==
Joint adoption for same-sex couples is legal and a law allowing such adoptions went into effect on 1 March 2017. The Finnish Parliament's approval of a same-sex marriage law in late 2014 included provisions allowing same-sex couples to adopt. Stepchild adoption has been legal since 2009. Female couples have more parental rights than male couples, given that access to in vitro fertilization (IVF) and artificial insemination has been permitted in 2006. Surrogacy remains illegal for both opposite-sex couples and same-sex couples.

In 2016, a citizen's initiative calling on Parliament to amend the law so as to allow female same-sex couples to have automatic parentage recognition in law was launched. Previously, such couples had to carry out an intra-family adoption to be recognised as the parents of children conceived via fertility treatment. In February 2018, the Parliament passed a law by a vote of 122–42 that includes lesbian couples in all rights of maternity pay and full parentage rights. It was signed by the President on 20 April 2018 and went into effect on 1 April 2019.

28 February 2018 vote in the Parliament of Finland
Party	Voted for	Voted against	Abstained	Absent (Did not vote)
Centre Party	22: Anne Berner; Hannakaisa Heikkinen; Petri Honkonen; Kauko Juhantalo; Antti Kaikkonen; Timo Kalli; Mikko Kärnä; Hanna Kosonen; Katri Kulmuni; Antti Kurvinen; Markku Pakkanen; Aila Paloniemi; Ulla Parviainen; Tuomo Puumala; Juha Pylväs; Antti Rantakangas; Juha Rehula; Markku Rossi; Annika Saarikko; Juha Sipilä; Matti Vanhanen; Eerikki Viljanen	15: Olavi Ala-Nissilä; Sirkka-Liisa Anttila; Pertti Hakanen; Lasse Hautala; Hannu Hoskonen; Seppo Kääriäinen; Esko Kiviranta; Markus Lohi; Eeva-Maria Maijala; Arto Pirttilahti; Pekka Puska; Mikko Savola; Martti Talja; Tapani Tölli; Ari Torniainen	–	12: Mikko Alatalo; Marisanna Jarva; Anne Kalmari; Elsi Katainen; Niilo Keränen; Timo V. Korhonen; Jari Leppä; Mika Lintilä; Mauri Pekkarinen; Kimmo Tiilikainen; Mirja Vehkaperä; Anu Vehviläinen
National Coalition Party	28: Sanni Grahn-Laasonen; Antti Häkkänen; Harry Harkimo; Timo Heinonen; Harri Jaskari; Ilkka Kanerva; Pia Kauma; Pauli Kiuru; Jaana Laitinen-Pesola; Sanna Lauslahti; Eero Lehti; Elina Lepomäki; Sari Multala; Kai Mykkänen; Sari Raassina; Veera Ruoho; Pertti Salolainen; Sari Sarkomaa; Arto Satonen; Saara-Sofia Sirén; Eero Suutari; Mari-Leena Talvitie; Kari Tolvanen; Juhana Vartiainen; Sofia Vikman; Anne-Mari Virolainen; Sinuhe Wallinheimo; Ben Zyskowicz	2: Kalle Jokinen; Jukka Kopra	–	8: Markku Eestilä; Susanna Koski; Outi Mäkelä; Petteri Orpo; Jaana Pelkonen; Paula Risikko^{b}; Wille Rydman; Lenita Toivakka
Social Democratic Party	30: Eeva-Johanna Eloranta; Maarit Feldt-Ranta; Tarja Filatov; Tuula Haatainen; Timo Harakka; Eero Heinäluoma; Susanna Huovinen; Lauri Ihalainen; Ilkka Kantola; Anneli Kiljunen; Krista Kiuru; Suna Kymäläinen; Antti Lindtman; Merja Mäkisalo-Ropponen; Sanna Marin; Riitta Myller; Ilmari Nurminen; Johanna Ojala-Niemelä; Sirpa Paatero; Joona Räsänen; Antti Rinne; Kristiina Salonen; Ville Skinnari; Satu Taavitsainen; Katja Taimela; Maria Tolppanen; Pilvi Torsti; Erkki Tuomioja; Tytti Tuppurainen; Pia Viitanen	–	–	5: Jukka Gustafsson; Maria Guzenina; Mika Kari; Jutta Urpilainen; Harry Wallin
Blue Reform	4: Tiina Elovaara; Ari Jalonen; Jari Lindström; Anne Louhelainen	10: Simon Elo; Reijo Hongisto; Kimmo Kivelä; Kari Kulmala; Lea Mäkipää; Martti Mölsä; Jussi Niinistö; Vesa-Matti Saarakkala; Timo Soini; Sampo Terho	1: Pirkko Mattila	4: Maria Lohela; Pentti Oinonen; Matti Torvinen; Kaj Turunen
Finns Party	4: Ritva Elomaa; Arja Juvonen; Ville Tavio; Ville Vähämäki	10: Laura Huhtasaari; Olli Immonen; Toimi Kankaanniemi; Rami Lehto; Jani Mäkelä; Leena Meri; Mika Niikko; Tom Packalén; Mika Raatikainen; Sami Savio	–	3: Juho Eerola; Teuvo Hakkarainen; Jari Ronkainen
Green League	13: Touko Aalto; Outi Alanko-Kahiluoto; Pekka Haavisto; Hanna Halmeenpää; Satu Hassi; Heli Järvinen; Emma Kari; Johanna Karimäki; Jyrki Kasvi; Krista Mikkonen; Ville Niinistö; Antero Vartia; Ozan Yanar	–	–	2: Olli-Poika Parviainen; Jani Toivola
Left Alliance	12: Li Andersson; Paavo Arhinmäki; Katja Hänninen; Anna Kontula; Annika Lapintie; Silvia Modig; Markus Mustajärvi; Jari Myllykoski; Aino-Kaisa Pekonen; Hanna Sarkkinen; Matti Semi; Kari Uotila	–	–	–
Swedish People's Party^{a}	9: Anders Adlercreutz; Eva Biaudet; Thomas Blomqvist; Anna-Maja Henriksson; Mats Löfström; Mikaela Nylander; Mats Nylund; Veronica Rehn-Kivi; Stefan Wallin	–	–	1: Joakim Strand
Christian Democrats	–	5: Sari Essayah; Antero Laukkanen; Peter Östman; Päivi Räsänen; Sari Tanus	–	–
Total	122	42	1	35

a. The Swedish-speaking Finns' parliamentary group consists of nine Swedish People’s Party members and one independent representing the Autonomous Region of Åland.
b. The Speaker votes only in unusual circumstances, though he or she continues to serve as one of the 200 members of Parliament.

== Discrimination protections ==
Discrimination based on sexual orientation has been criminalized since 1995 and on gender identity or expression since 2005. The Act on Equality between Women and Men prohibits discrimination on account of sex and gender identity. In 2014, the Finnish Parliament amended the law, establishing further protections in employment, the provision of goods and services, education and health services.

Section 8(1) of the Discrimination Act (Finnish: Yhdenvertaisuuslaki; Swedish: Diskrimineringslag) (Note: Northern Sami: Ovttaveardásašvuođaláhka; Inari Sami: Oovtviärdásâšvuođâlaahâ; Skolt Sami: Õõutverddsažvuõttlääʹǩǩ) reads as follows:

No one may be discriminated against on the basis of age, origin, nationality, language, religion, belief, opinion, political activity, trade union activity, family relationships, state of health, disability, sexual orientation or other personal characteristics. Discrimination is prohibited, regardless of whether it is based on a fact or assumption concerning the person him/herself or another.

Finnish police reported 73 violent attacks and assaults against LGBT people in 2018, a 27% increase compared to 2017. Attacks related to sexual orientation were the only type of hate motive to increase, with attacks relating to national background, disability or religion decreasing. In November 2019, the Institute of Health and Welfare reported that LGBT children and youth face significantly more bullying, physical, psychological and sexual violence than their heterosexual peers, and are also more likely to suffer from violence at home.

== Transgender and intersex rights ==
=== Right to change legal gender ===
Until 2023, people wishing to have their legal gender reassigned on official documents, such as passports, birth certificates and IDs, needed to be sterilized or "for some other reason infertile". In 2012, a possible change of the law was put under consideration by the Finnish Ministry of Social Affairs and Health. A recommendation from the UN Human Rights Council to eliminate the sterilization requirement was rejected by the Finnish Government in 2017. In October 2017, a bill to amend the law failed because not enough MPs supported the measure. Committee chair Tuula Haatainen said that only 8 out of the 17 committee members supported the bill. The bill was introduced by Left Alliance MP Silvia Modig in 2016 and had gathered 85 MP signatures in the Finnish Parliament.

In 2017, Sakris Kupila, a transgender activist and medical student, was denied a legal gender reassignment after refusing to undergo this process, campaigning along with Amnesty International to demand a change to the law. Transgender people also had to receive a mental disorder diagnosis in order to have legal gender reassigned.

In 2019, the newly elected Rinne Cabinet released their legislative plans for the next 4 years. It includes the removal of the sterilisation requirement for sex reassignment and banning surgeries on intersex infants. However the Rinne cabinet resigned before this legislation could be introduced to parliament.

On 6 April 2021, a citizens' initiative suggesting changes to the transgender law, such as removing the sterilization requirement and giving the right for transgender people at least 15 years of age to change their legal gender with the permission of a guardian was proposed. It achieved the required 50,000 signatures 1 day after the submission, and was sent to parliament on the 24th of September with a total of 68,374 signatures.

The act passed with amendments on 1 February 2023, with votes 113–69. Most government parties voted for and most opposition parties voted against; the government Centre Party and opposition National Coalition Party were divided. In amendments, the age limit for changing one's gender was increased to 18 years, and a limit of at most one change per year, unless a special reason is provided, was instituted. The law also included a 30-day "period of reflection". The process was controversial as the Centre Party, who according to the Social Democrats had promised to vote for the law in committee, opposed it in the Social Affairs and Health Committee. According to the Centre Party, the law concerned a matter on which its representatives were allowed to vote freely based on their conscience. In March 2023, the President of Finland formally signed the bill into law and it went into legal effect on April 3.

=== Access to healthcare ===
In 2020, the Council for Choices in Health Care released new guidelines which prioritized "psychosocial therapy" over medical transition for both adults and youth (defined as under 25). However, these guidelines are a recommendation, not a mandate. The Council for Choices in Health Care allows the use of puberty blockers in transgender children after a case-by-case assessment if there are no medical contraindications. They also recommended that cross sex hormones be considered for transgender minors "if it can be ascertained that their identity as the other sex is of a permanent nature and causes severe dysphoria." Transgender minors in Finland can still access gender-affirming care at one of the country's two centralized gender identity units for minors.

A survey conducted by Seta found that over 40% of trans respondents were entirely unable to access the care they needed, with the majority of respondents reporting extended waiting times for care.

== Blood donation ==
In Finland, as in many other countries, gay and bisexual men were previously not allowed to donate blood. In December 2013, the Finnish Medicines Agency changed its rules on blood donations, repealing a permanent ban for men who have sex with men (MSM) and setting a one-year deferral period.

In 2021, the deferral period was shortened to 4 months. Since December 2023, there is no extra deferral period for MSM.

== Public opinion ==
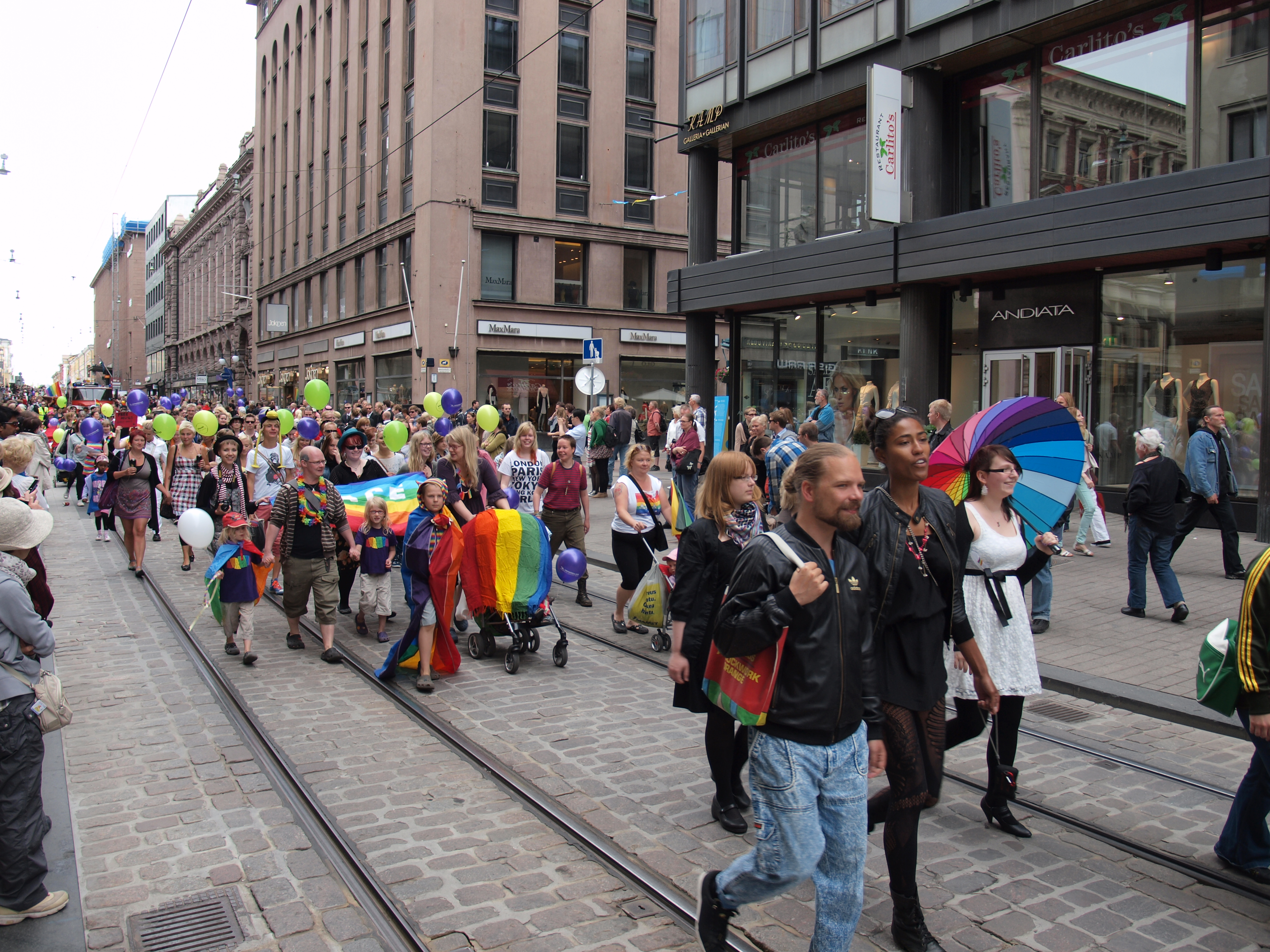
Helsinki Pride in 2012

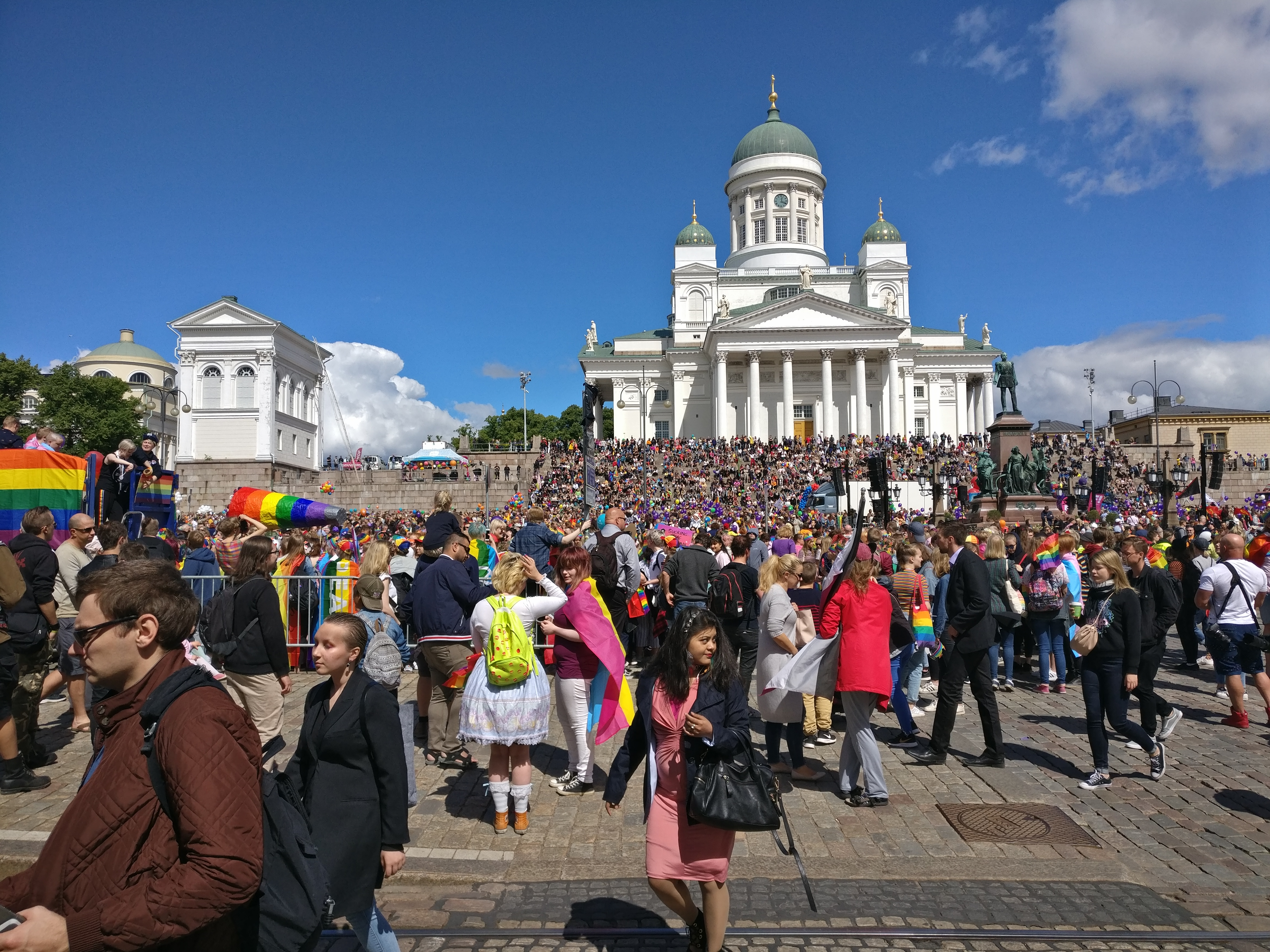
The 2018 Helsinki Pride parade was attended by an estimated 100,000 people, almost triple that of 2017. Helsinki Cathedral is centre-right.

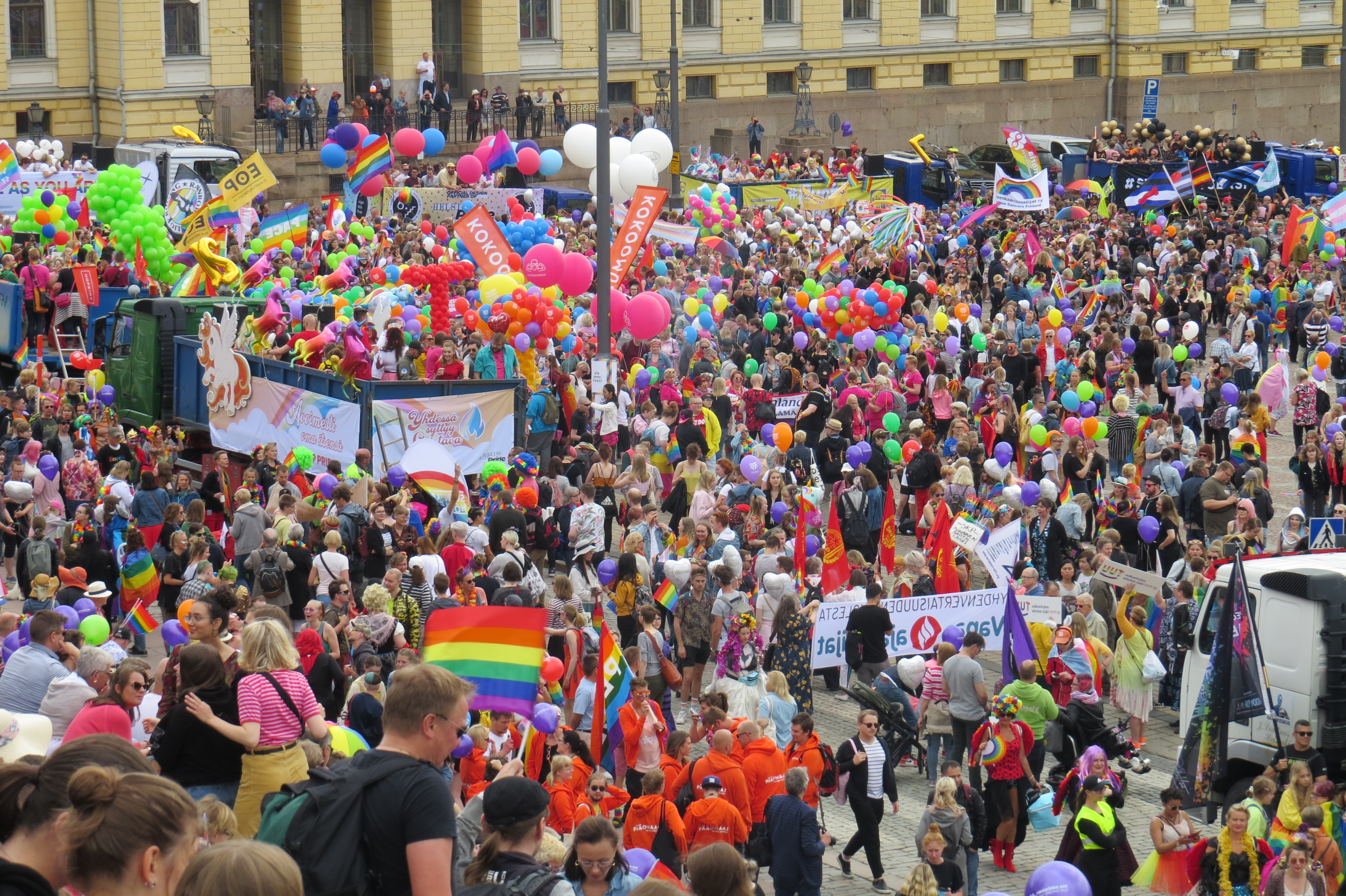
Participants at Helsinki Pride, 2019

Support for same-sex marriage in Finland has grown gradually since the 2000s. A December 2006 EU poll put Finnish support for same-sex marriage at 45%, while an August 2010 survey conducted by Yle put support at 54% with 35% opposing it. In January 2013, a poll conducted by YouGov found that support had climbed to 57%, with 32% opposed and 12% unsure. In the same survey, support for same-sex adoption was 51%, with 36% opposed and 13% unsure. A March 2013 survey by Taloustutkimus found that 58% of Finns supported same-sex marriage. A survey taken in March 2014 by Taloustutkimus found that 65% of Finns supported same-sex marriage, while 27% opposed. A different survey in March 2014 found that 57% supported same-sex adoption, while 36% opposed.

A gay rights panel discussion that aired on Yle TV2 on 12 October, 2010 was followed by an unprecedented high number of people leaving the Evangelical Lutheran Church of Finland. In 2014, thousands of Finns resigned from the Church, following comments made by church officials supporting the same-sex marriage legislation. In June 2019, Archbishop Tapio Luoma affirmed that same-sex couples are welcome at all church activities.

The 2015 Eurobarometer found that 66% of Finns thought that same-sex marriage should be allowed throughout Europe, 28% were against.

In 2015's Finsex study, 29% of Finnish men answered that homosexuality is "perverted", while the number was 43% in 2002. In 2015, 15% of women answered that homosexuality is "perverted", as opposed to 28% in 2002. In 2015 around 40% of young Finnish women claimed same sex attraction, while around 20% of young Finnish men claimed same sex attraction.

The 2019 Eurobarometer found that 76% of Finns thought same-sex marriage should be allowed throughout Europe, while 21% were against. 80% believed that gay, lesbian and bisexual people should enjoy the same rights as heterosexual people, and 79% believed there is nothing wrong about a same-sex sexual relationship.

The 2023 Eurobarometer found that 76% of Finns people thought same-sex marriage should be allowed throughout Europe, and 82% agreed that "there is nothing wrong in a sexual relationship between two persons of the same sex".

== Living conditions ==
Finland is often referred to as one of the most LGBT-friendly countries in the world and public acceptance of LGBT people and same-sex relationships is high. The "Gay Happiness Index" (GHI), based on a poll by PlanetRomeo, lists Finland as the twelfth happiest country for LGBT people, on par with countries such as New Zealand and Spain. In March 2019, Finland was ranked the fourth-best LGBT-friendly travel destination in the world, tied with several other European countries, including the Netherlands, Austria, Malta and Iceland among others.

Several Finnish cities have organisations which campaign for LGBT rights. The largest such group is Seta, founded in 1974. Others include Trasek, a transgender and intersex rights group, and Rainbow Families (Sateenkaariperheet, Regnbågsfamiljer). These groups advocate for legal and equal rights for same-sex couples and transgender individuals through political lobbying, the dissemination of information and the organization of social and support activities. They also offer help, guidance and counselling concerning coming out, health, sex and relationships.

There is a visible gay scene in the capital Helsinki, with various gay bars, clubs, cafés and other venues and events. The first public gay demonstration in Finland was held in 1981 in Helsinki under the name Liberation Days (Vapautuspäivät, Befrielsedagen). Pride parades are held in various cities across Finland, notably in the capital Helsinki, but also in cities such as Oulu, Jyväskylä, Turku, Tampere, Rovaniemi, Lappeenranta, Loviisa, Pori, Riihimäki, Lahti, Kouvola and Kuusamo. An estimated 100,000 people attended the 2018 Helsinki Pride parade, and Prime Minister Antti Rinne participated in its 2019 edition. Sápmi Pride is held in the far north, rotating cities between Norway, Sweden and Finland every year. It was held in Finland for the first time in 2017 in the city of Inari.

=== Politics ===
In 2011, Pekka Haavisto, an openly gay member of the Finnish Parliament and former Environment Minister, was nominated as the Green League candidate for the Finnish presidential election of 2012. In the first round of the election on 22 January 2012, he finished second with 18.8 percent of the votes, but in the run-off on 5 February, he lost to the National Coalition Party candidate, former Finance Minister Sauli Niinistö with 37.4 percent of the votes.

In February 2017, Haavisto announced that he would reprise his candidacy in the 2018 presidential election. The decision came after Haavisto had been approached multiple times by the Green League. In the election, Haavisto placed second with 12.4 percent of the votes, while President Niinistö went on to secure his second term with a majority of votes.

== Summary table ==
Same-sex sexual activity legal	Yes (Since 1971)
Equal age of consent (16)	Yes (Since 1999)
Anti-discrimination laws in employment only	Yes (Since 1995)
Anti-discrimination laws in the provision of goods and services	Yes (Since 2001)
Anti-discrimination laws in all other areas (incl. indirect discrimination, hate speech)	Yes (Since 2004)
Anti-discrimination laws concerning gender identity	Yes (Since 2005)
Gender self-identification	Yes (Since 2023)
Legal recognition of non-binary gender	No
Recognition of same-sex couples	Yes (Since 2002)
Same-sex marriages	Yes (Since 2017)
Same-sex civil unions	(2002–2017)
Stepchild adoption by same-sex couples	Yes (Since 2009)
Joint adoption by same-sex couples	Yes (Since 2017)
LGBTQ people allowed to serve openly in the military	Yes (Never banned)
Right to change legal gender on documents (i.e. on a birth certificate)	Yes (Since 2023, by self-determination without forced SRS and sterilization)
Access to IVF for lesbian couples	Yes (Since 2006)
Automatic parenthood for both spouses after birth	Yes (Since 2019)
Conversion therapy banned on minors	No (Pending)
Conversion therapy banned on adults	No
Commercial surrogacy for gay male couples	No (Illegal for heterosexual couples also)
Commercial surrogacy for lesbian couples	No (Illegal for heterosexual couples also)
MSMs allowed to donate blood	Yes (Legal since 2013, no deferral period since 2023)

== See also ==
- SETA (organization)
- Human rights in Finland
- LGBT rights in Europe
- LGBT rights in the European Union
- A Moment in the Reeds, 2017 film
- Tom of Finland, 2017 film
