= Transgender history in Finland =

The history of transgender people, their rights, legislation concerning them, and transgender healthcare in Finland dates from the earliest records in the 19th century.

Before there was legislation on transgender issues in Finland, it was possible for transgender people to change their gender marker or name. Transgender healthcare has been offered since at least the 1980s, but there was a lack of uniformity as courts and local authorities had widely different practices, and the national legislation that did apply was also generally not suited for serving transgender people. The first Finnish Trans Act was passed in 2002, came into force the next year, and gave legal recognition to transgender people and standardized their treatment by public authorities. It required that someone changing their gender be infertile, making a process that had become relatively simple in the 1990s harder. These aspects of the law were criticized by national and international organizations. The Social Democrat cabinets from 2019 onward promised to allow gender self-determination for adults. In 2021, an initiative to reform the law, but with a lower age limit, was started by the transgender advocacy organization Trans ry. It garnered the necessary 50,000 signatures within two days and was given to Parliament. The act was passed on 1 February 2023. As amended, it allows any adult to change their gender marker at their will.

Though trans patients were mentioned in medical journals in the 19th century and early 1900s, more extensive documentation exists from the 1950s onward. From the 1950s to the 1970s, psychiatrists were supportive of transgender patients' identities but were reluctant to provide somatic treatments like hormone therapy or gender-affirming surgery. Through the 1970s and 1980s, knowledge about trans healthcare improved, treatments became available, and, by the 1990s, they were relatively routine.

== Before 2000 ==
There are records of transgender people in Finland since the late 19th century. In 1882, the Proceedings of the Finnish Medical Association (Swedish: Finska Läkaresällskapets Handlingar) published a case study of a patient who was assigned female at birth (AFAB) but identified as male. Another case of an AFAB patient who identified as male was recorded in 1919. More records exist from the Helsinki Psychiatric Clinic from the 1950s and 1960s. During this period, transgender people were diagnosed with transvestitismus, classified as a "sexual anomaly" in the Finnish version of the ICD-6 diagnostic system. Psychiatrists generally tried to be supportive and would recommend gender-affirming social adjustments, but did not prescribe patients with hormone therapy or gender-affirming surgery, except in very few cases. The first gender-affirming surgery in Finland was conducted in 1954, and another in the early 1960s. There were also an unknown number of failed operations, and some surgeries were performed in secret. In the following decades, better information about transgender people became available through the work of Harry Benjamin in the United States and Jan Wålinder in Sweden. This also led to treatments becoming more common. By the end of the 1980s, approximately 35 people had been operated on in Finland; by comparison, 153 people had received surgeries in Sweden, and over one thousand in both Germany and the United Kingdom.

Prior to any laws concerning transgender rights being passed, trans people could change their gender marker by going to their local register office, while transgender healthcare was regulated by the laws concerning castration, which were not intended for this purpose. Usually a psychiatrist's diagnosis and evidence of infertility were required to change one's gender marker, but this was not always the case. The Name Act also permitted changing one's name. Only a small number of applications for castration for the purpose of gender-affirming care were made during the 1960s and 1970s, which according to a report for the Ministry of Social Affairs and Health may suggest that this was not necessary to receive care. Applications became more numerous when, in the 1980s, it became a prerequisite for gender-affirming surgery. During that decade, the relevant authority approved the majority of applications. In any case, the lack of legislation caused wide discrepancies in the treatment of transgender matters by public officials. In 1991, the Finnish Parliamentary Ombudsman declared there was an urgent need for a law concerning the change of one's gender marker. The Ministry of Health prepared a draft in 1992, which would have required people changing their legal gender to never have married or had children. The draft received heavy criticism, and according to anthropologist Veronica Pimenoff was deemed contrary to human rights, and never made it to parliament.

In the 1990s, the first national clinical guidelines for transgender health were issued in Finland, based on The Harry Benjamin International Gender Dysphoria Association's (now the World Professional Association for Transgender Health) Standards of Care for Gender Identity Disorders. The Helsinki-based Trans Support Centre (Finnish: Transtukikeskus) also started offering support for trans people and training for professionals encountering them.

The Finnish trans rights organization Trasek was founded in 1984, and came to be recognized as a representative of trans patients in patients' rights.

== First Trans Act ==
The Trans Act (Finnish: Translaki; full title: Finnish: Laki transseksuaalin sukupuolen vahvistamisesta) was approved by Parliament on 28 June 2002, and became law the following year. The act provided that a person could change their legal gender, provided they fulfill four requirements: that they provide medical evidence of permanently identifying as belonging to the opposite gender, live as this gender, and are sterilized or otherwise infertile; that they be adult; that they not be married or in a civil union; and that they are a Finnish citizen or a permanent resident. This unified and standardized common procedures from the preceding years, but according to anthropologist Pimenoff, it actually made changing one's gender marker harder than it had become in the 1990s. The act was further clarified by secondary legislation concerning among other issues which kind of medical evidence was necessary: a psychiatric evaluation and diagnosis. The infertility caused by hormone therapy was still seen as sufficient sterilization. However, the act and decree also made it harder to get hormone therapy, requiring a psychiatrist's recommendation for a treatment which previously could be prescribed by a doctor unconnected to the transgender health system. While hormonal sterilization was the most common, some patients did undergo surgical sterilizations in order to be allowed to change their gender marker.

Of the ICD-10's gender identity-related diagnoses only Transsexualism (F64.0) was an acceptable reason to change one's gender marker, and not for example Other gender identity disorders (F64.8).

In the early 2010s, many non-governmental organizations began to demand reform of the Trans Act. LGBT rights organisation Seta demanded a reform in a 2010 campaign, and subsequently Amnesty and Trasek also began to call for reform. In 2011 the Finnish equality ombudsman said the infertility requirement breached human rights and should be immediately removed. In 2012, after a visit to Finland, the Council of Europe's Commissioner for Human Rights, Nils Muižnieks demanded that the provisions about infertility and being unmarried be removed.

A workgroup of the Ministry of Social Affairs and Health sat from 2013 to 2014, aiming to investigate a possible reform of the legislation. Though its conclusion was criticized as lacking by Seta and Trasek, it proposed abolishing the Trans Act's controversial requirements, as well as suggesting that gender self-determination be looked into. It also delivered a draft amendment to the government, which never made it to Parliament.

== Towards the 2023 Trans Act ==
Reforming the Trans Act to allow adults to self-determine their gender was part of the Rinne and Marin Cabinets' government programmes. Seta's president, Sakris Kupila, criticized this proposal for not affording self-determination to minors. On 5 April 2021, Trans ry, an offshoot of Trasek, started an initiative to reform the Trans Act. The initiative demanded self-determination for anyone aged 15 and up, and would have required parental consent for those under. The initiative had gathered the 50,000 signatures necessary to be discussed in Parliament by the day after. The initiative was set to be handed to Parliament on 25 September 2021.

The government's proposal was presented to Parliament on 22 September 2022, with the planned age limit of eighteen years. It was first debated by the Social Affairs and Health committee; while the bill was successfully sent to the plenary session, the Centre Party voted against it, prompting Prime Minister Sanna Marin to accuse them of violating the government's agreed-upon rules. After the National Coalition's demand, the bill was also amended to require at least one year between successive applications, unless an important reason is presented. The committee also put forward statements demanding the government investigate and eventually put forward bills on the matters of transgender people in sports and self-determination for trans youth.

The bill was passed by Parliament on 1 February 2023 with votes 113–69. Representatives voted along party lines, except for the government Centre Party and opposition National Coalition, whose votes were split. Parliament also passed a statement which calls for the government to adjust secondary legislation to further the self-determination of transgender youth.

== See also ==
- LGBT history in Finland
