= LGBTQ history in Finland =

This article is about lesbian, gay, bisexual and transgender (LGBT) history in Finland.

== Timeline of the legislation ==
- 1894 Homosexuality is criminalized in the new Criminal Code and punishable by a maximum of two years in prison.
- 1971 Homosexuality is decriminalized, but "promotion" of it remains illegal.
- 1981 Homosexuality is removed from the illness classification list.
- 1995 Discrimination on the basis of sexual orientation is prohibited in the Criminal Code.
- 1999 The Criminal Code is revised, ruling that there is no longer any age of consent difference between sexual acts performed by heterosexuals and those performed by homosexuals. The prohibition of "promotion of homosexuality" is removed.
- 2001 The Act on Registered Partnerships is passed in the Parliament. It follows the same regulations as the Marriage Act (for different-sex couples), though excluding the right to take the spouse's name and the right of adoption. The law comes into force on March 1, 2002, and the first couples are registered on March 8.
- 2003 The law on the gender confirmation of transgender individuals comes into force.
- 2004 The Non-Discrimination Act comes into force on February 1, prohibiting direct and indirect discrimination and harassment based on age, ethnic or national origin, citizenship, language, religion, belief, opinion, health, disability, sexual orientation or any other ground in connection to the person.
- 2005 The revised Act on Gender Equality comes into force on June 1, 2005. According to a report by the Parliamentary Employment and Equality Committee, the revised Act is —under the rulings of Court of Justice of the European Union— to be interpreted in the way that the Section 7 prohibition of discrimination on the basis of sex covers also transgender individuals.
- 2007 The Act on Assisted Fertility Treatments enters into force on September 1, 2007. The law allows treatments also for single women and female couples. Prior to the law, a number of clinics have provided treatments for female couples. Surrogacy remains illegal.
- 2009 The Act on Registered Partnerships is revised in the Parliament with votes 109—28 (out of 199) on May 15 and comes into force on September 1. After the revision, law gives the other party of a gay couple the right to adopt his or her spouse's biological child — hereby both the parties are legal parents. Two factors — the right to a joint last name and to external adoptions — remain excluded from registered partnerships, in contrast to marriages.
- 2011 The Finnish National Institute for Health and Welfare removes dual-role transvestism, fetishism, fetishistic transvestism, sadomasochism and multiple disorders of sexual preference from its illness classification.
- 2023 A new law on change of legal gender is enacted, allowing transgender people self-determination in this matter.

== LGBT rights-related events in the 2000s ==
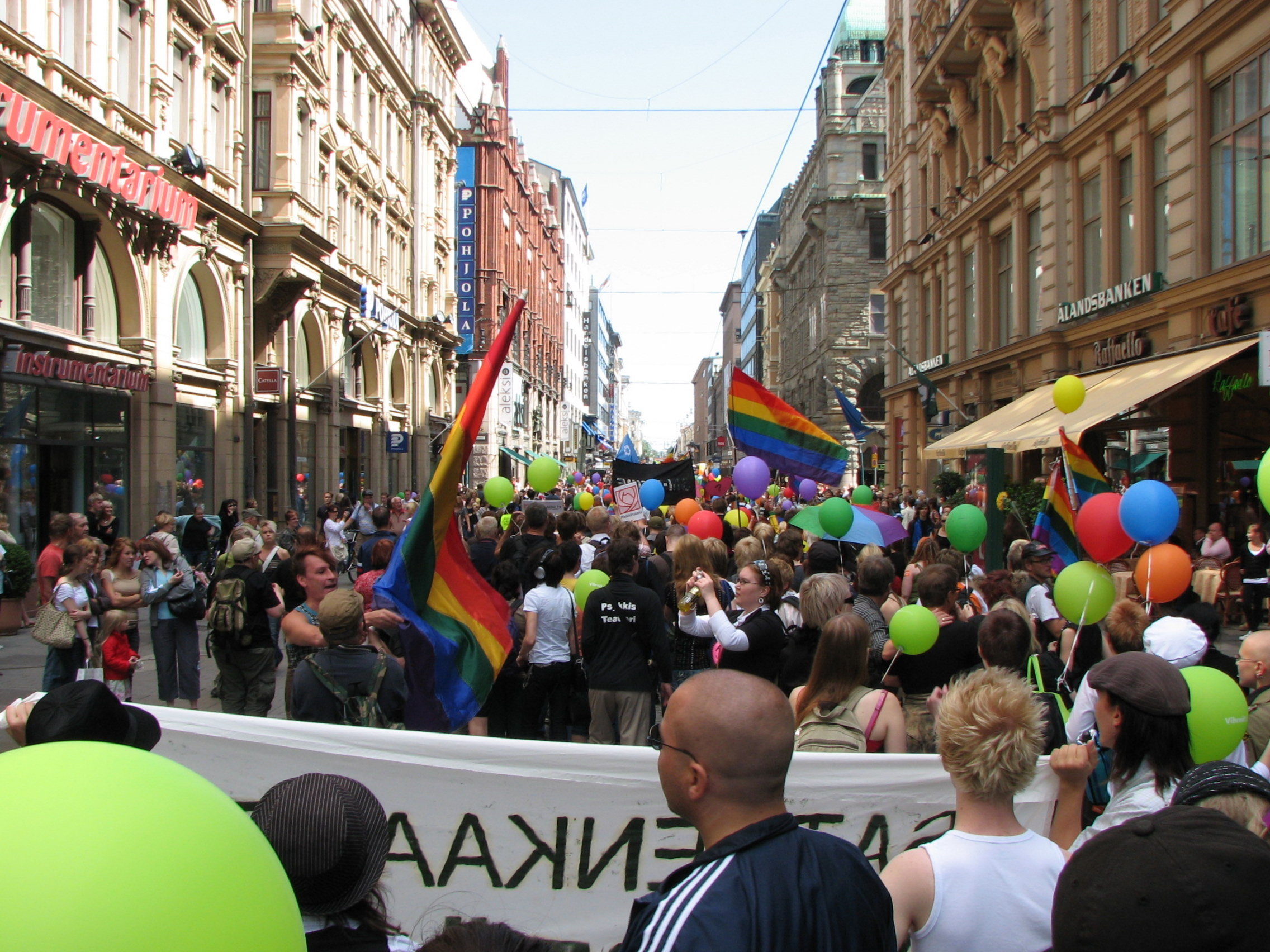
Helsinki Pride 2007

=== Dismissal of editor-in-chief Johanna Korhonen ===
LGBT rights in Finnish worklife drew heavy attention in the media in late September 2008, when Finnish journalist Johanna Korhonen, living in a registered partnership with a woman, was dismissed by Alma Media from the position of editor-in-chief for Lapin Kansa, a newspaper owned by Alma Media, before she even started working. According to Alma Media CEO Kai Telanne, the cause of dismissal was lack of trust, caused by Korhonen not mentioning her spouse's candidacy in the 2008 municipal elections — i.e., Telanne said it was a policy within Alma Media for editor-in-chief applicants to disclose all their political connections.

However, Korhonen claimed that the real cause was that the company found out about her sexual orientation after the recruitment process, where she simply said she had a spouse and two children, not mentioning her spouse's sex. Arto Nieminen, the spokesman for the Union of Journalists in Finland, said he had never heard of people, applying to become editors-in-chiefs for Alma Media newspapers, being asked about the political activity of their spouses. Korhonen also alleged that Alma Media offered her €100,000 for not disclosing the cause of dismissal. Telanne denied her allegation, saying the sum was a severance payment not paid in reward for falling silent for the cause.

Korhonen filed a lawsuit at Helsinki District Court against Alma Media for the dismissal she deemed unlawful. In June 2009, Korhonen lost the case and was required to pay €8,000 in court costs, but she appealed the decision to Helsinki Court of Appeals, which judged the case in favor of Korhonen awarding her a total of €80,400 for wrongful termination. Two months later, on May 17, Alma Media requested a leave to appeal the case to the Supreme Court. On February 1, 2011, the Supreme Court refused to grant the leave to appeal, determining the case in Korhonen's favor and forcing Alma Media to pay Korhonen the €80,400.

=== Sex reassignment of former Vicar Marja-Sisko Aalto ===
On November 11, 2008, the then-Vicar of Imatra parish Marja-Sisko Aalto told the media that she was a trans woman and would go through sex reassignment therapy. This caused a great controversy in the Church. The bishop of Mikkeli, Voitto Huotari, commented that there was no legal obstacle for Aalto continuing as a vicar, but that there would be "problems." In 2009 almost 600 members left the Imatra parish. In November 2009 Marja-Sisko returned to the job of vicar after spending a year on leave, but in March 2010 she requested to be allowed to resign, due to her "difficulties to build trust within her parish".

=== July 2010 Helsinki pride parade attack and vandalism against HeSeta's office ===
The 2010 Helsinki Pride week organized by HeSeta, Helsinki branch of Finnish LGBT rights organization Seta, culminated in the June 3 pride parade which was targeted with a pepper spray attack. The same day, the police took three men, two 18-year-olds and one 20-year-old, into custody suspected of the attack and the police considered the attack "premeditated". The Security Police later stated that some of the suspects have links to radical right groups. On June 7, Helsinki District Court detained the three suspected of assault, violation of political freedom and prevention of a public meeting. In the Finnish Criminal Code, "directing of the offence at a person belonging to a national, racial, ethnic or other population group due to his or her membership in such a group" is an aggravating circumstance in sentencing. On March 1, 2011, the State Prosecutor pressed charges against the three with the abovementioned, suspected actions and possession of an object or substance suitable for injuring another person.

The attack was condemned by several major politicians, including President Tarja Halonen, Prime Minister Mari Kiviniemi, Foreign Minister Alexander Stubb, and Minister of Migration and European Affairs Astrid Thors.

On July 8, the headquarters of HeSeta, Helsinki branch of Finnish LGBT rights organization Seta, was attacked when its windows were broken and swastikas were sprayed on the doors.

A few politicians of the Christian Democrats were accused of understating the attack. On June 8, while considering the attack "condemnable and worrisome", spokeswoman for Christian Democrats Päivi Räsänen wondered on her blog if "the stupid attack against the pride parade could also be interpreted as a counter-reaction to the political elite's strong shift towards liberal values". Prime Minister Mari Kiviniemi expressed "having strong difficulties trying to understand Räsänen's attempts to justify the attacks". The next day, Jyväskylä City Council member and chief of information services for Christian Democrats, Asmo Maanselkä raised a media furor by writing a column on Keskisuomalainen's website where he said that "in general discussion people forget that the pride parade is also a provocation against traditional values" and "we can reach peaceful coexistence only if the margin does not urge their values to be the foundation of the values of the whole community." The same day in his press release Maanselkä "apologized to all who felt offended by his statements", saying he "condemns violence of all kinds" and just "wanted to reflect on the relations between majority and minority". He said to Suomen Tietotoimisto that he received "a lot of fierce feedback" on his comments.

=== Homoilta and resignations from the Evangelical Lutheran Church ===
The debate over gay marriage has also influenced the statistics of people leaving the Evangelical Lutheran Church. On October 12, 2010, on TV2 (YLE), the current affairs program Ajankohtainen kakkonen had a special panel discussion episode, A2 Teema, with the title Homoilta (literally "Gay Night", loosely "On Gay People"). The 18 participants, including e.g. Christian Democrat MP Päivi Räsänen, Vicar of Tampere parish Matti Repo, True Finns' MP Pentti Oinonen, Bible teacher Pasi Turunen (all four opponents of gay marriage), pastor Leena Huovinen (who has blessed lesbian couples), openly gay Green League MP Oras Tynkkynen, board member of Seta Manne Maalismaa and Mr Gay Finland Kenneth Liukkonen (all four proponents), discussed same-sex marriage and, later on in the program, LGBT rights in general. The following day, over 2,000 people left the Church online, through eroakirkosta.fi ("resign from the church"), while the average has been at 130. By Friday, November 26, over 47,000 people had left the church through the website since October 12. The press officer of the website, Heikki Orsila, has said the error margin between the resignations submitted through the online forms and the real resignations is 4 % at most. The show and the exodus from the Church was also noticed abroad — American celebrity blogger Perez Hilton wrote on his blog on October 23 how he was "impressed by people taking a stand for what's right". On March 16, 2011, Homoilta won the award for Finnish Journalistic Contribution of the Year, awarded by the media company Bonnier. The jury justified the award saying the panel discussion "stirred up a heavy discussion of not only the status of sexual minorities, but also the contemporary people's interest in values associated with the Church". According to the jury, "the gay discussion has extended to a broader discussion of a Finland, liberal on the one hand and conservative on the other hand".

The TV debate kept the LGBT issues in general in public discussion and on November 3, 2010, numerous celebrities including Ministers Tuija Brax and Alexander Stubb appeared on a YouTube video Kaikki muuttuu paremmaksi ("Everything Will Get Better") encouraging gay and lesbian teenagers to feel comfortable with their sexuality. The video was inspired by the American It Gets Better Project aimed against suicides among gay and lesbian teenagers.

=== 2012 Presidential election ===
Pekka Haavisto, an openly gay member of the Finnish parliament, was nominated as the Green League candidate for the Finnish presidential election of 2012. In the first round of the election on 22 January 2012, he finished second with 18.8 percent of the votes, but in the run-off on 5 February, he lost to the National Coalition Party candidate, former Finance Minister Sauli Niinistö with 37.4 percent of the votes. Haavisto became the first openly gay presidential candidate in the country.

=== Gay men's blood donations ===
In December 2013, the Finnish Medicines Agency changed its long-contested rules on blood donations, repealing a permanent ban for men who have had sex with men (MSM) and setting a one-year deferral.

== Studies ==
The YLE News organization published an article which estimated that 10%-20% of the Finnish population may be homosexual or have had homosexual attraction.

== See also ==
- LGBT rights in Finland
- Transgender history in Finland
