= Väätäinen =

Väätäinen is a Finnish surname. Notable people with the surname include:

- Janne Väätäinen (born 1975), Finnish ski jumper
- Juha Väätäinen (born 1941), Finnish long-distance runner and politician
- Tuula Väätäinen (born 1955), Finnish politician
