= Antikainen =

Antikainen is a Finnish surname, most prevalent in Northern Savonia. Notable people with the surname include:

- Toivo Antikainen (1898–1941), Finnish-born communist and military officer
- Eero Antikainen (1906–1960), Finnish sawmill worker, trade union leader and politician
- Sanna Antikainen (born 1988), Finnish politician
