= North Karelia (parliamentary electoral district) =

Former electoral district of the Parliament of Finland

North Karelia (formerly Kuopio East) was an electoral district represented in the Finnish Eduskunta (parliament). In 2013, it was merged with Northern Savonia electoral district to form the Savonia-Karelia electoral district. It covered the administrative region of North Karelia, with a population of 169,722 (as of 2002). North Karelia elected six members of the Eduskunta, when in 2005, there were still seven seats.

The constituency was largely rural, centred on the city of Joensuu. The largest party in the Finnish parliamentary elections has traditionally been the Centre Party.

The reduction of seats caused the Green League leader Tarja Cronberg to lose her seat in 2007 elections, even though she got 11.7% and the second most votes in constituency.

== Members of parliament ==
=== 2003–2007 ===
- Tarja Cronberg (VIHR)
- Hannu Hoskonen (Kesk.)
- Lauri Kähkönen (SDP)
- Esa Lahtela (SDP)
- Esko Mononen (vas.)
- Eero Reijonen (Kesk.)
- Säde Tahvanainen (SDP)
- Matti Väistö (Kesk.)

=== 2007–2011 ===
- Hannu Hoskonen (Kesk.)
- Lauri Kähkönen (SDP)
- Esa Lahtela (SDP)
- Pekka Ravi (Kok.)
- Eero Reijonen (Kesk.)
- Anu Vehviläinen (Kesk.)

== Election results ==
Finnish parliamentary election, 2003
Party	Seats	Net gain/loss	Seats %	Votes %	Votes	+/−
Centre	3	+1	42.9	37.6	33,026	+7.3%
SDP	3	-1	42.9	34.9	30,639	-1.9%
National Coalition	0	-1	0.0	9.7	8,498	-1.5%
Green	1	+1	14.3	6.6	5,767	+2.4%
Left Alliance	0	0	0.0	4.9	4,326	-0.2%
KD	0	0	0.0	4.3	3,798	-2.0%
Communist Party	0	0	0.0	1.0	837	+0.2%
other groups	0	0	0.0	1.1	933	n/a

Finnish parliamentary election, 2007
Party	Seats	Net gain/loss	Seats %	Votes %	Votes	+/−
Centre	3	0	50	35.7	30,391	-1.9%
SDP	2	-1	33.3	31.6	26,942	-3.3%
National Coalition	1	+1	16.7	11.8	10,041	+2.1%
Green	0	-1	0.0	11.7	9,955	+5.1%
KD	0	0	0.0	3.0	2,574	-1.3%
Finns	0	0	0.0	2.8	2,428	+2.1%
Left Alliance	0	0	0.0	2.5	2,163	-2.4%
other groups	0	0	0.0	0.9	747	n/a

== See also ==
- Electoral districts of Finland
