= Pekka Ravi =

Finnish politician

Personal details
- Born: November 26, 1949 (age 75); Helsinki, Finland
- Political party: National Coalition Party

Pekka Tapani Ravi (born 26 November 1949 in Helsinki, Finland) is a Finnish politician. He served as a member of the National Coalition Party in 1999–2003 and 2007–2015.

== Biography ==
Ravi graduated as a primary school class teacher in 1973 from Joensuu University of Applied Sciences and two years later as a Bachelor of Arts. At the beginning of his career, he worked as a substitute teacher in Lieksa in 1969–1970 and in Liperi in 1973–1974 before becoming a permanent hourly teacher in Eno in 1975. He worked at the Eno upper secondary school until 1976, after which he worked as a general teacher at a comprehensive school in Joensuu from 1976 to 1977 and as a class teacher in the same town from 1977 to 1990. From 1990 to 2009, Ravi was the principal of the Karsikko School in Joensuu.

=== Political career ===
Ravi was elected as a member of parliament in the 1999 Parliamentary elections from the North Karelia constituency. During his first term of office, he served as a full member of two committees, the Committee on Administrative Affairs from 1999 and the Committee on Constitutional Affairs from 2000. He was a deputy member of the Constitutional Affairs Committee from April 1999 to September 2000 and a deputy member of the Legal Affairs Committee for the whole term. Ravi was expelled from the Parliament in the 2003 Parliamentary elections, where the Coalition Party lost its only seat in North Karelia, but returned to the Parliament in the 2007 Parliamentary elections. He served as the chairman of the Coalition Party's parliamentary group from April 2007, after the previous group leader Jyri Häkämies became Minister of Defence. In June 2011, Ravi was elected as the 1st Deputy Speaker of the Parliament. Ravi was elected to Parliament for a second time in the 2015 parliamentary elections, where he stood as a candidate in the Savo-Karelia constituency, which was created by the merger of two constituencies. Ravi was elected as the first deputy speaker of the Parliament.

Ravi was a member of the Joensuu City Council from 1985 to 2012 and its chairman from 2005 to 2008. He was Chairman of the Joensuu City Council from 1986 to 1999. Mr Ravi is the longest-serving chairman of the Joensuu City Council. He was awarded the title of City Councillor in 2006.

Ravi has been a member of the Council of Governors of the Union of Local and Regional Authorities 1993–1999 and a member of the board of directors 2001–2013. He has also served as chairman of the Board of the Finnish Museum Association, among others.
