= Katainen =

Katainen is a Finnish surname. Notable people with the surname include:

- Elsi Katainen (born 1966), Finnish politician
- Jyrki Katainen (born 1971), Finnish politician
