= Reijonen =

Reijonen is a Finnish surname. Notable people with the surname include:

- Minna Reijonen (born 1972), Finnish politician
- Seppo Reijonen (1944–2026), Finnish ski jumper
