= Timo Vornanen =

Politician, member of the Parliament of Finland (born 1969)

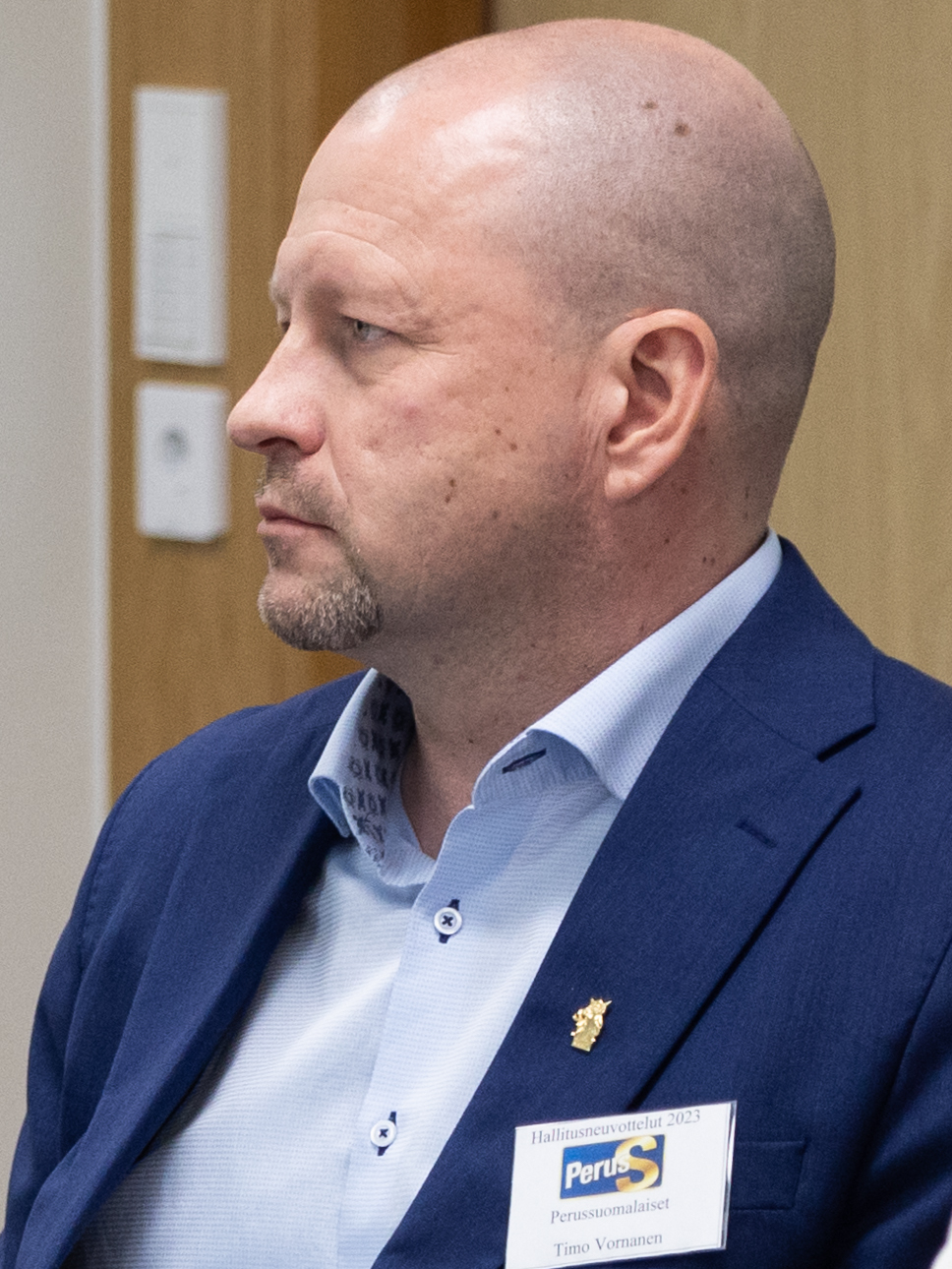
- Timo Vornanen in 2023

Member of the Parliament of Finland
- Incumbent
- Assumed office 5 April 2023
- Constituency: Savo-Karelia

Personal details
- Born: 30 July 1969 (age 56) Joensuu
- Party: Finns Party (until 2024)
- Profession: Police officer
- Website: timo-vornanen.fi

Timo Mikael Vornanen (born 30 July 1969) is a Finnish politician and a police officer. He is a member of the Parliament of Finland.

== Biography ==
Vornanen has worked as a police constable since 1993. Vornanen supports traditional and Christian values. His 2023 electoral campaign included themes like anti-immigration, crime prevention and harsher penalties on violent offenses.

== Shooting incident ==
On 26 April 2024, Vornanen was arrested over a nightclub shooting incident. He had argued with another man about attention of young women, at a Helsinki karaoke bar. Outside the bar Vornanen pulled out a CZ 92 handgun and pointed it at his opponent before firing a shot into the ground. He was arrested at 4 AM that day and released on 27 April. Vornanen is suspected of gun violation and attempted aggravated assault. Another Finns Party MP at the scene was Sanna Antikainen. On 2 May, Vornanen was expelled from the Finns Party's parliamentary group following a unanimous decision by the party leadership. Vornanen apologised for the shooting incident but said that he would not resign from Parliament in the absence of a court decision and pledged to establish his own parliamentary group.

In July 2024, the criminal investigation concerning Vornanen was completed. The police suspect Vornanen of endangering safety, making two illegal threats, committing a firearms offense, and a firearms violation. During a search of Vornanen's home, two magazines and two gas weapons were confiscated, for which Vornanen did not have the required permits. The criminal allegations are being forwarded to the prosecutor for consideration.
