= Lauri Kähkönen =

Finnish politician

Lauri Risto Kalevi Kähkönen (19 February 1947 – 13 May 2016) was a Finnish politician for the Social Democratic Party. He represented North Karelia in the national parliament from 1999 until 2011. He was a city councillor for Lieksa, where he lived all of his life, from 1989 until his death. He was born to Onni and Helvi Saastamoinen Kähkönen, both sawmill workers. He married Mirja Hirvonen in 1968, having two children, Marika (born in 1972) and Harri (born in 1977). He had been a high school principal since the 1980s.
