= Timo Suhonen =

Finnish politician

Member of the Finnish Parliament for Savo-Karelia
- Incumbent
- Assumed office 5 April 2023

Personal details
- Born: 1974 (age 51–52)
- Party: Social Democratic Party
- Website: https://www.timosuhonen.fi/

Timo Suhonen (born 1974) is a Finnish politician who has served in the Parliament of Finland since 2023 for the Social Democratic Party representing the Savo-Karelia electoral district.
