= Sakris Kupila =

Finnish human rights and LGBT activist

- Born: April 14, 1996 (age 30); Humppila, Finland
- Occupation: Medical student

Sakris Kupila (born 1996 and from Humppila, near Forssa) is a Finnish transgender medical student and the former chair of Seta from 2019–20, a major Finnish LGBT rights group.

== Biography ==
Kupila was assigned female at birth but experienced gender dysphoria from an early age. At the age of nineteen, he initiated the legal process of change of gender from female to male. As a condition for this, he first had to receive a psychiatric diagnosis of transsexuality which equates the condition to a mental disorder.

In addition, Finland had a legal requirement for gender change of sterilization. Kupila refused this and was denied a change in legal gender. In response, he began an international campaign involving Amnesty International to have the Finnish law changed as infringing his transgender rights. The latter he considered as an integral part of his overall human rights.

This was despite LGBT rights in Finland being regarded as some of the most progressive in the world.

The campaign ended in August 2017, when the Finnish government decided not to amend the law on gender transitions.

Kupila is married, under Finnish same-sex marriage law, to Jaana Tiiri who is a disability rights activist. They reside in Helsinki, where he is undertaking medical studies at the University of Helsinki.

In 2019, he was listed as among the top ten most influential medical professionals in Finland.
