= Laura Meriluoto =

Finnish politician (born 1985)

Member of the Finnish Parliament for Savo-Karelia
- Incumbent
- Assumed office 5 April 2023

Personal details
- Born: 1985 (age 40–41) Kuusankoski
- Party: Left Alliance
- Website: https://www.laurameriluoto.fi/

Laura Meriluoto (born 1985) is a Finnish politician who has served in the Parliament of Finland since 2023 for the Left Alliance representing the Savo-Karelia electoral district.
