= Citizens' Party (Finland) =

- Finnish name: Kansalaispuolue
- Swedish name: Medborgarpartiet
- Abbreviation: KP
- Chairman: Sami Kilpeläinen
- Founded: 2016
- Dissolved: 2022
- Split from: Centre Party
- Merged into: Christian Democrats (de facto)
- Ideology: Euroscepticism
- Political position: Centre

Website
- kansalaispuolue.net

Citizens' Party (Finnish: Kansalaispuolue, Swedish: Medborgarpartiet) was a Finnish political party, founded in 2016. It was founded by the long-time Centre Party politician and MEP Paavo Väyrynen, who left Centre in early 2016. Väyrynen acted as the first chairman of the party until July 2017, when he was succeeded by Sami Kilpeläinen.

The party did not take part in the 2017 municipal elections, although Väyrynen was elected to the City Council of Helsinki as an independent candidate. Väyrynen also participated in the 2018 presidential election as an independent candidate, finishing fourth with 6.2 percent of the votes.

In March 2018, Citizens' Party expelled Väyrynen from the party, due to his alleged misdeeds with the campaign funding during the presidential elections. Väyrynen denied the allegations and instead started a court case against the activities of the board of the party. While the court case was still ongoing, Väyrynen founded a Citizens' Party's parliamentary group, intending to represent the party within the parliament.

In November 2018, the District Court of Helsinki deemed void the majority of decisions made by the party board, including the decision to expel Väyrynen. Chairman Sami Kilpeläinen soon announced that they would appeal against the decision while preparing for the 2019 parliamentary election as usual. The decision promoted Väyrynen to abandon the Citizens' Party's parliamentary group in favor of that of his Seven Star Movement. In April 2019, Citizens' Party and Väyrynen settled their differences.

Citizens' Party took part in the 2019 parliamentary election, but none of its candidates were elected. The party was dissolved in August 2022, and its active members were transferred to the Christian Democrats.

== Electoral performance ==
=== Parliament of Finland ===
Year	Elected	Votes	Share
2019	0	7,645	0.2%

=== European Parliament ===
Year	Elected	Votes	Share	Ref.
2019	0	2,043	0.1%	

=== Municipal elections ===
Year	Elected	Votes	Share
2021	0	41	0.0%
