= Harri Jaskari =

Finnish politician

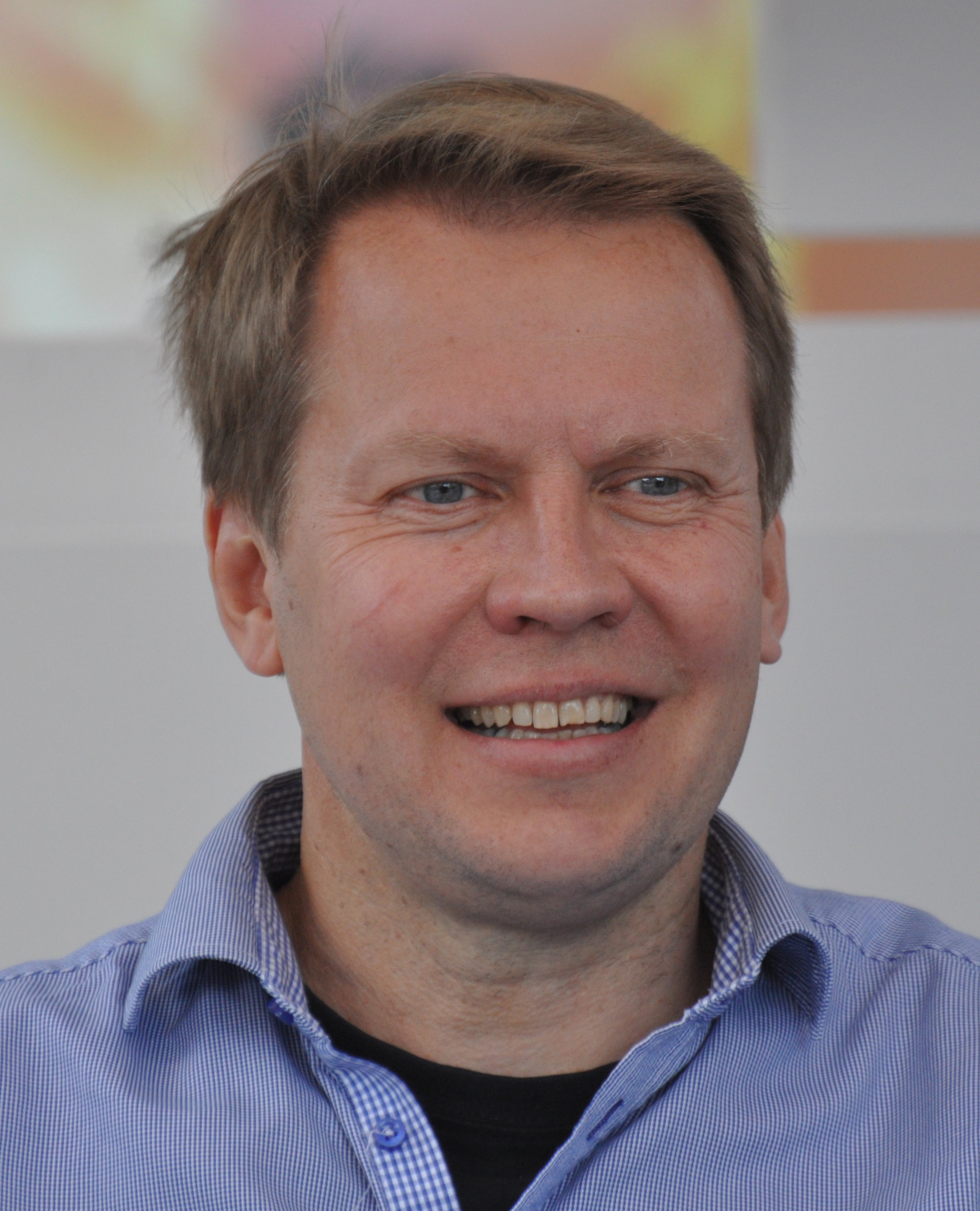

Member of the Parliament of Finland
- In office 2007–2019

Personal details
- Born: March 26, 1964 (age 61); Virrat, Finland
- Political party: National Coalition Party

Harri Matti Jaskari (born 26 March 1964 in Virrat, Finland) is a Finnish politician. He has served as a member of the National Coalition Party's Parliament from 2007 to 2019 in the Pirkanmaa constituency and as a member of Tampere City Council since 2000. After leaving the Parliament, Jaskari worked as an entrepreneur until he was appointed Director of Business Policy of the Finnish Entrepreneurs' Association in June 2021.

Before entering Parliament, Jaskari worked as Special Assistant to the Minister in the Ministry of the Interior in 2000, as managing director of the Tampere Chamber of Commerce from 2001 to 2004, and as Party secretary of the Coalition Party from 2004 to 2006. He was Sauli Niinistö's campaign manager in the 2006 presidential election. Jaskari was chairman of the Board of the Pirkanmaa Regional Association from 2013 to 2017.

== Biography ==
He has been a researcher at the University of Tampere (1987–1990), the Academy of Finland (1990–1993) and the University of Edinburgh (1991–1992).

In 1994–1995, Jaskari was project manager at the Kymenlaakso Chamber of Commerce and in 1996–1999 he was an industry representative at the Confederation of Finnish Industry and Employers.

=== Political career ===
Jaskari was first elected to Parliament in the 2007 elections with 4,812 votes.[5] In the 2011 elections, he was re-elected with 4,556 votes. He was chairman of the Finnish delegation to the Parliamentary Assembly of the Union for the Mediterranean (UfM) in 2011–2015 and, as chairman, a member of the Forum on International Affairs.

In 2013, he wrote the report Inspired Society together with Member of Parliament Marjo Matikainen-Kallström and in 2015 the Coalition Party's energy policy vision Light and Heat for Finland.

In spring 2016, Jaskari became campaign manager for Elina Lepomäki, who is seeking the Coalition Party's presidency.

Jaskari dropped out of the Parliament in the 2019 parliamentary elections with 3,417 votes.
