= Seven Star Movement =

- Finnish name: Seitsemän tähden liike
- Swedish name: Sjustjärnerörelsen
- Abbreviation: tl
- President: Paavo Väyrynen
- Secretary: Seppo Hauta-aho
- Founded: 2018
- Dissolved: 2024
- Split from: Citizens' Party
- Headquarters: Helsinki
- Ideology: Euroscepticism; Nationalism; Alkionism; Decentralisation
- Political position: Centre-right

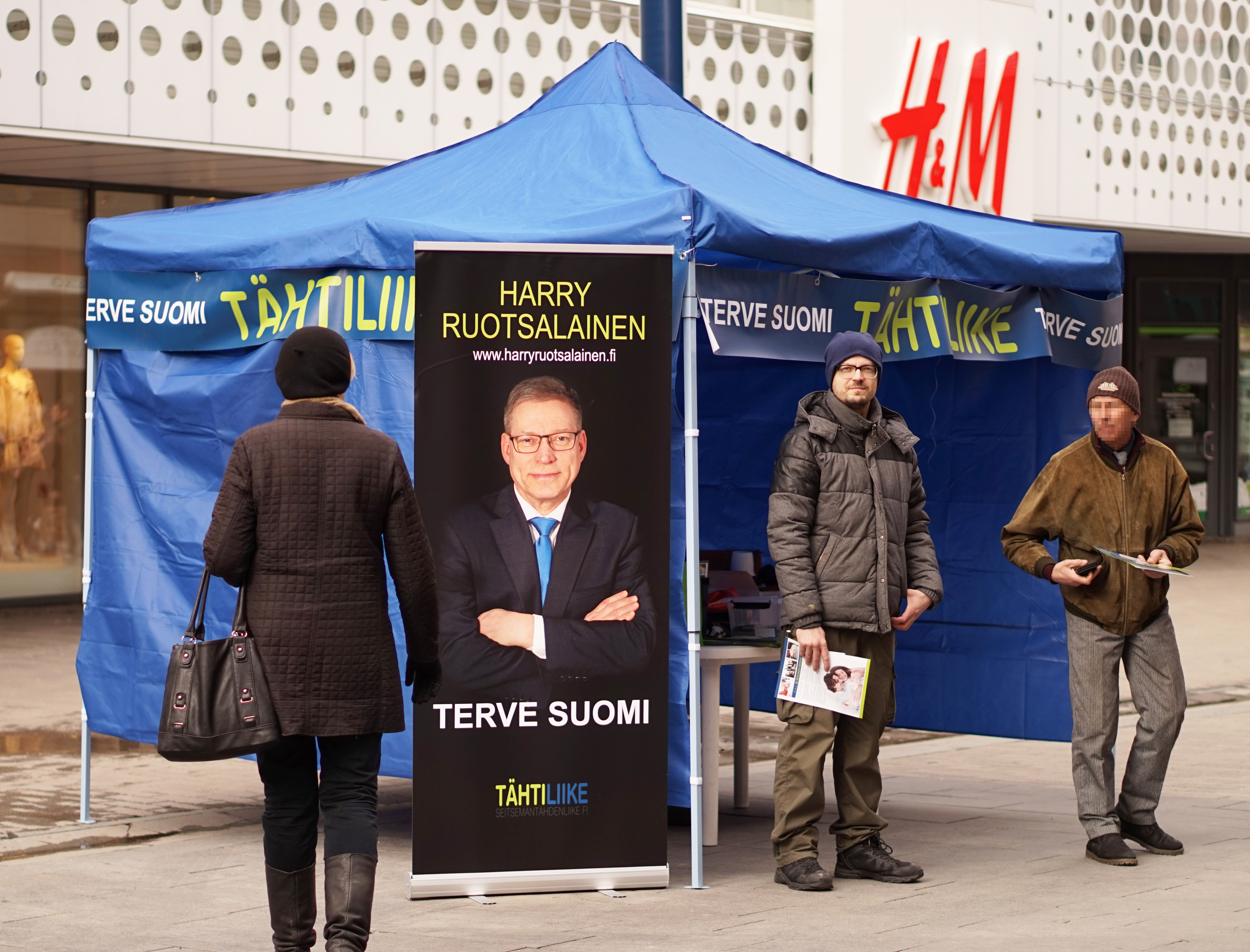
Seven Star Movement campaigning for the 2019 Finnish parliamentary election

Seven Star Movement (Finnish: Seitsemän tähden liike, Swedish: Sjustjärnerörelsen) was a Finnish political party founded in 2018. The party was founded by Paavo Väyrynen, its president and only MP, after he was ousted from his previous party, Citizens' Party. The Seven Star Movement shut down its activities after the 2019 European Parliament election and was de-registered in 2023 after failing to win seats in two consecutive parliamentary elections. The party was officially dissolved in 2024.

== History ==
Paavo Väyrynen had successfully run for the Finnish Parliament in the 2015 Finnish parliamentary election, representing the Centre Party. Väyrynen, however, chose to forfeit his seat in order to serve in the European Parliament that he had entered earlier. Väyrynen returned to the Finnish Parliament in June 2018, but defected from the Centre Party to the Citizens' Party, which he had founded. The Citizens' Party was already engulfed in a power struggle at that time, which resulted in Väyrynen's ousting In late June, Väyrynen announced that he had founded the Seven Star Movement as a substitute for Citizens' Party, with which he remained in the parliament for a time. The name was inspired by the Italian Five Star Movement. The Seven Star Movement's goals were political independence, non-alignment, and greater immigration control.

A trial court ruled in November 2018 that Väyrynen's ousting had been illegal. Despite the ruling, the legal struggle convinced Väyrynen to go forward with his Seven Star Movement rather than the Citizens' Party. Later that month, Väyrynen announced that he had officially aligned himself with the Seven Star Movement's parliamentary group, and therefore became their first MP. Väyrynen was the president of the party. The secretary was Seppo Hauta-aho, Väyrynen's former campaign aide. The party was based in Helsinki.

The movement gathered 5,000 supporter cards by December 2018 and was admitted to the party register on 21 December 2018. The party took part in the 2019 parliamentary election, but failed to get a single seat in the parliament. After the election, Väyrynen wrote in his blog that the party would continue its operations. Although initially skeptical about the party taking part in the 2019 European Parliament election, they decided to run. After the Seven Star Movement failed to win any seats, Väyrynen resigned from the party, which then announced that it would focus its efforts on supporting Väyrynen's potential candidacy in the Finnish presidential election of 2024.

== Electoral performance ==
=== Parliamentary elections ===
| Year | Elected | Votes | Share | Ref |
|---|---|---|---|---|
| 2019 | 0 | 11,366 | 0.4% | |

== See also ==
- Politics of Finland
- List of political parties in Finland
- Elections in Finland
