= Seppo Eskelinen =

Finnish politician

Member of the Finnish Parliament for Savonia-Karelia

Personal details
- Born: July 4, 1960 (age 65) Kontiolahti, North Karelia, Finland
- Party: Social Democratic Party of Finland

Seppo Antero Eskelinen (born 4 July 1960, in Kontiolahti) is a Finnish politician currently serving in the Parliament of Finland for the Social Democratic Party of Finland at the Savonia-Karelia constituency.
