= Marko Kilpi =

Finnish politician (born 1969)

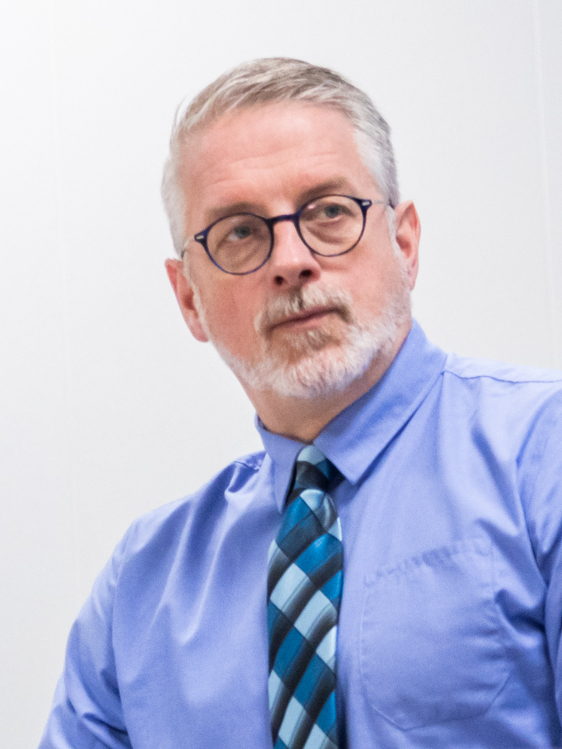
- Kilpi in 2023.

Member of the Finnish Parliament for Savonia-Karelia

Personal details
- Born: 19 May 1969 (age 56) Rovaniemi, Lapland, Finland
- Party: National Coalition Party

Marko Kilpi (born 19 May 1969 in Rovaniemi) is a Finnish politician currently serving in the Parliament of Finland for the National Coalition Party at the Savonia-Karelia constituency.
