= Hannakaisa Heikkinen =

Finnish politician

Hannakaisa Heikkinen (born 7 April 1974) is a Finnish politician. She has been a Member of the Parliament for the Centre Party from 2007 to 2011 and since 2015.

== Early life and education ==
Born in Juankoski, Heikkinen now lives in Kiuruvesi. She graduated as Bachelor of Nursing from the JAMK University of Applied Sciences in 1999 and as Master of Health Sciences from the University of Jyväskylä in 2006. In addition to nursing, she has worked as a farmer.

== Political career ==
Heikkinen was elected to the Parliament of Finland with 7,083 votes from Northern Savonia in 2007. She left the Parliament in 2011 but returned in 2015 with 10,712 votes from Savonia-Karelia. In the Parliament, she is currently vice chair of the Social Affairs and Health Committee and member of the Employment and Equality Committee.

Heikkinen has named promotion of work, education, health and agriculture as her main objective in politics.
