= Jussi Wihonen =

Finnish politician

Member of the Finnish Parliament for Savonia-Karelia
- In office 17 April 2019 – 4 April 2023

Personal details
- Born: 20 February 1963 (age 63) Joensuu
- Party: Finns Party

Jussi Wihonen is a Finnish politician who served in the Parliament of Finland from 2019 to 2023 for the Finns Party representing the Savonia-Karelia constituency.
