= Hanna Räsänen =

Finnish politician (born 1969)

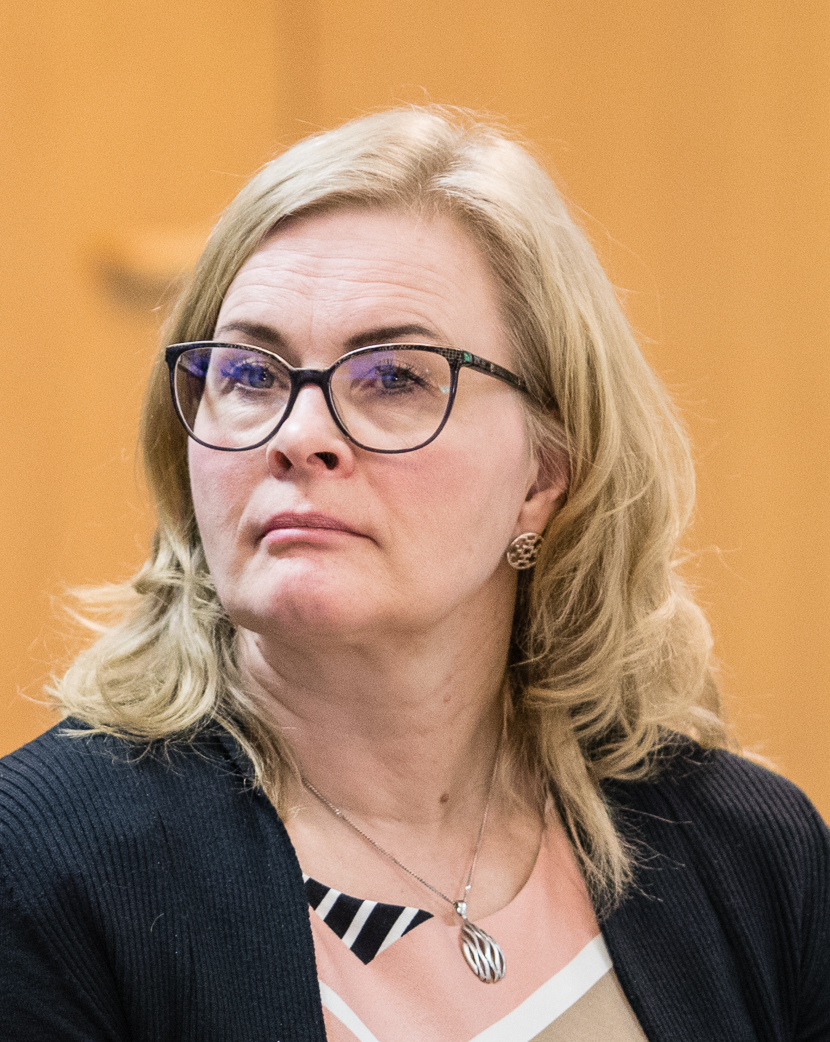

Member of the Finnish Parliament for Savonia-Karelia
- Incumbent
- Assumed office 17 April 2019

Personal details
- Born: 14 April 1969 (age 57) Outokumpu, North Karelia, Finland
- Party: Centre Party

Hanna Räsänen (née Huttunen; born 14 April 1969, in Outokumpu) is a Finnish politician currently serving in the Parliament of Finland for the Centre Party at the Savonia-Karelia constituency.
