= Elsi Katainen =

Finnish politician (born 1966)

Elsi Katainen MEP
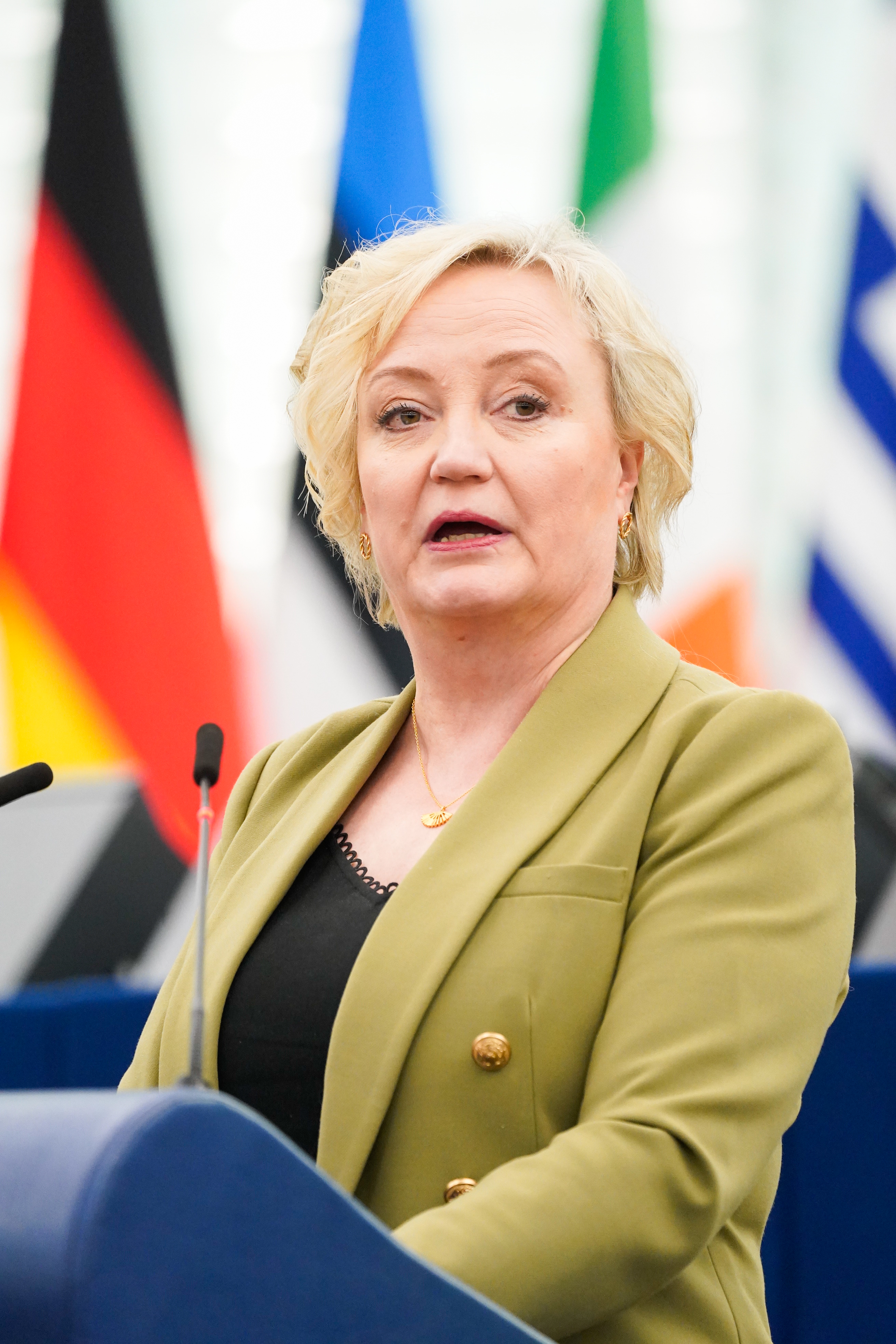

Member of the European Parliament
- Incumbent
- Assumed office 1 March 2018
- Constituency: Finland

Member of the Finnish Parliament
- In office 21 March 2007 – 28 February 2018
- Constituency: Northern Savonia (2007–2015); Savonia-Karelia (2015–2018)

Personal details
- Born: 17 December 1966 (age 59) Haapajärvi, Finland
- Party: Finnish; Centre Party; EU; Alliance of Liberals and Democrats for Europe

Elsi Kaarina Katainen (born 17 December 1966) is a Finnish politician and a Member of the European Parliament (MEP). She is a member of the Centre Party, part of the Alliance of Liberals and Democrats for Europe.

== Parliamentary activity ==
Katainen served as member of the Finnish Parliament from 2007 until 2018.

Katainen took part in the 2014 European Parliament election, but didn't get elected. However, after MEP Hannu Takkula was appointed to the European Court of Auditors in March 2018, Katainen took his seat in the European Parliament for the remainder of the term. From 2018 until 2019, she was a member of the Committee on International Trade. Since the 2019 elections, she has been serving on the Committee on Agriculture and Rural Development.

In addition to her committee assignments, Katainen is part of the Parliament's delegation to the EU-Russia Parliamentary Cooperation Committee. She is also a member of the European Parliament Intergroup on Climate Change, Biodiversity and Sustainable Development and the MEPs Against Cancer group.

As rapporteur for an opinion on Horizon Europe in the non-lead committee on agriculture, Katainen advocated for a mission "Carbon neutral, resilient, nutritious and zero-waste food systems by 2035", for basic research in the open science pillar and for the role of forestry in a bio-circular economy.
