= Matti Semi =

Finnish politician

Veli Matti Semi
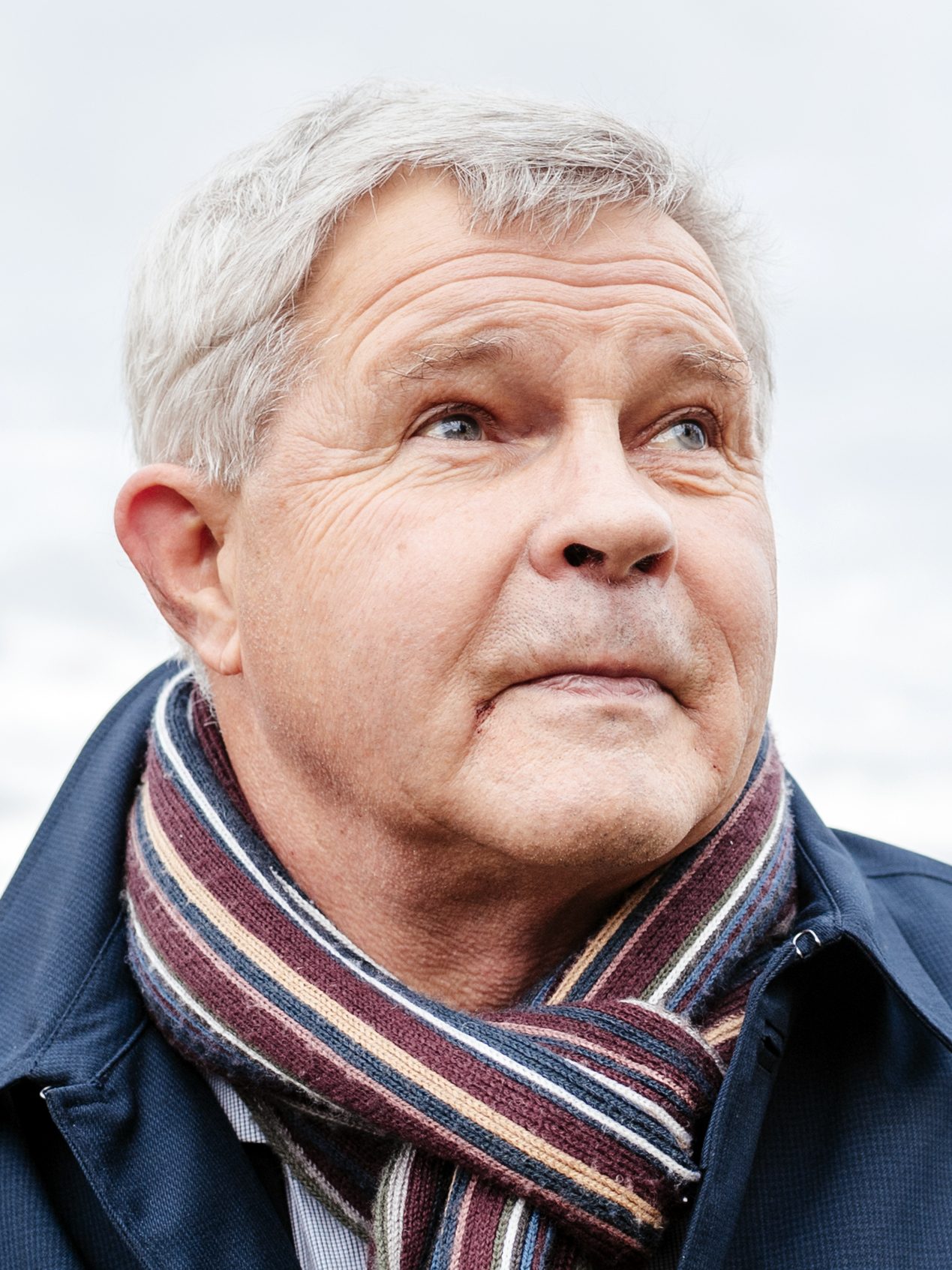
- Matti Semi in 2019

Member of the Finnish Parliament for Savo-Karelia
- In office 22 April 2015 – 4 April 2023

Personal details
- Born: January 26, 1957 (age 69) Varkaus, North Savo, Finland
- Party: Left Alliance
- Occupation: Construction worker, Politician

Matti Semi (born 26 January 1957) is a Finnish politician and former member of Finnish Parliament, representing the Left Alliance. He was elected to parliament in the 2015 parliamentary election with 2140 votes. Semi was born in Varkaus, where he has been a member of the City Council of Varkaus since 1993. Prior to becoming a politician, Semi was a construction worker and a boxer. In 1978 and 1979 he received the bronze medal in the Finnish boxing championships in the 71 kg class.
