= Minna Reijonen =

Finnish politician

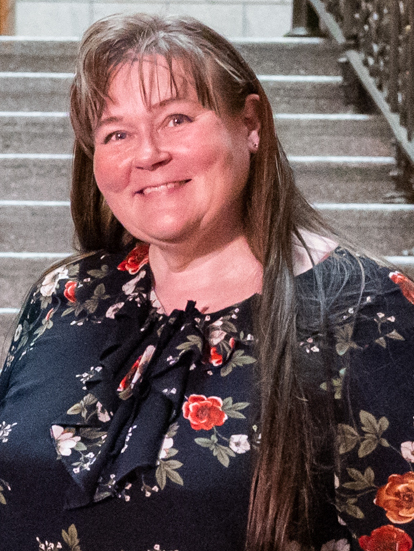
- Reijonen in June 2023.

Member of the Finnish Parliament for Savonia-Karelia
- Incumbent
- Assumed office 17 April 2019

Personal details
- Born: 13 October 1972 (age 53) Nilsiä, Northern Savonia, Finland
- Party: Finns Party

Minna Helmi Reijonen (born 13 October 1972 in Nilsiä) is a Finnish politician currently serving in the Parliament of Finland for the Finns Party at the Savonia-Karelia constituency.
