= Seta (organization) =

Finnish LGBT rights organization

Seta ry
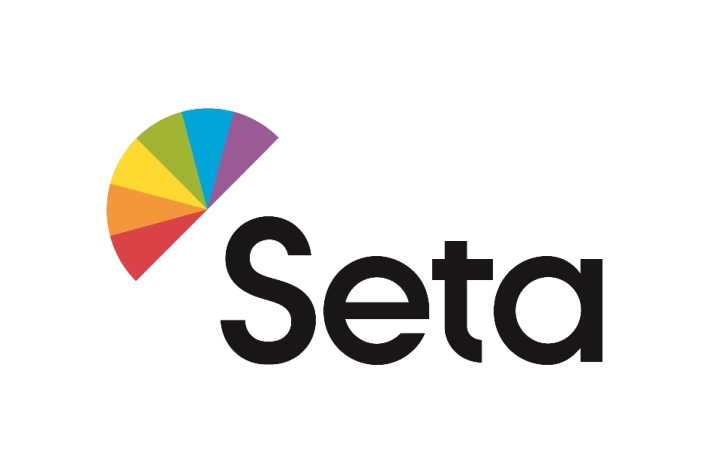
- Founded: 29 May 1974; 52 years ago
- Type: NGO
- Purpose: LGBT rights
- Headquarters: Haapaniemenkatu 7-9, 00530 Helsinki
- Location: Helsinki, Finland
- Region served: Finland
- Services: Gender Diversity & Intersex Centre of Expertise; Online Youth house Loiste
- Secretary General: Kerttu Tarjamo
- Chairperson: Anu Kantola
- Vice Charperson: Jenna Wahlstén
- Vice Chairperson: Niilo Ciriaco
- Staff: 14 (during year 2024)
- Website: https://seta.fi/

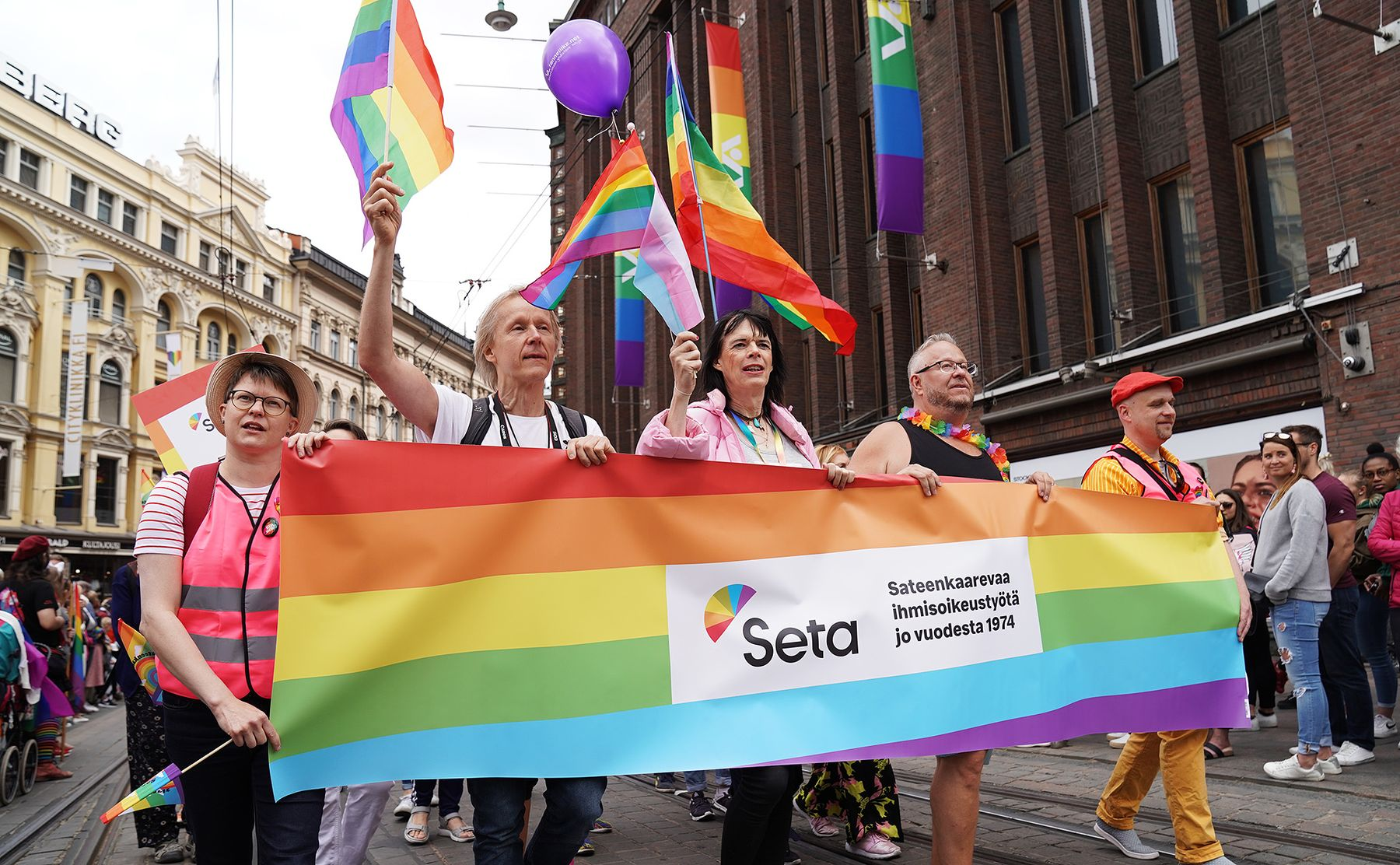
Seta's group at Helsinki Pride 2019. Secretary General Kerttu Tarjamo on the left side of the picture holding banner. Seta´s board members, staff and volunteers attend various Pride events in Finland.

LGBTI Rights in Finland Seta (Seta ry), founded in 1974, is the main LGBT rights organization in Finland. It is a national organization with several member organizations around the country. Seta´s secretary general is Kerttu Tarjamo and chairperson Anu Kantola. The 11th President of Finland, Tarja Halonen, was the chairwoman of Seta 1980–1981.

Seta engages with the whole of society and collaborates with a wide range of institutions, governmental bodies and international organizations. Seta's work and activities are based on human rights and self-determination. Seta is a member of ILGA Europe, Transgender Europe, IGLYO and a supporting member of EuroCentralAsian Lesbian Community. In Finland Seta is a member of SOSTE, The Finnish National Youth Council Allianssi and Family Federation of Finland.

Seta aims for an equal society and individual welfare that includes everyone, regardless of sexual orientation, gender identity, or gender expression. Seta´s main goals are a national governmental LGBTI roadmap, recognition of non-binary identities, well-being of LGBTI children and youth, equal family rights, and combating rising hate crimes and hate speech.

Seta's main functions are human rights work and advocacy, awareness raising and education, youth work and supporting member organizations. Seta also offers social support at special units Gender Diversity & Intersex Centre of Expertise (Sukupuolen moninaisuuden osaamiskeskus) and Online Youth House Loiste (verkkonuorisotalo Loiste). Gender Diversity & Intersex Centre of Expertise offers free fo charge counselling, short-term therapy and peer group activities to transgender, non-binary and intersex persons and their loved ones and increases public awareness about gender diversity. Loiste is a safe space on Discord to LGBTIQA+ youth aged 13 and up. Youth workers at Loiste offer group chats and counseling, and run a network of youth workers who organize LGBTIQA+-specific activities all around Finland.

Seta is a national umbrella organization with over 60 member organizations. Some operate nationwide (e.g., Rainbow Families), while others function at the local or regional level. Activities are organized by a large number of volunteers and employees. Seta provides support, funding, and training for member organizations and acts as a forum for LGBTIQ+ organizations in Finland.

== Awards ==
Seta awards the annual Asiallisen tiedon omena (the "Apple of Objective Information") to people or organizations that have improved the status of LGBT minorities or distributed objective information about the diversity of sexual orientation and gender. It has been awarded to the following people or organizations, among others:

- 2008 to singer Jenni Vartiainen and songwriter Teemu Brunila for their single "Ihmisten edessä". According to Seta, the piece is an apposite evocation of the courage needed from LGBT people to e.g. publicly hold hands.
- 2022 to trade union TEK for their work on promoting equality and diversity.

The Kunniarotta ("Rat of Honor") is an ironic anti-honor awarded to people or organizations that have contributed to discrimination based on sexuality or gender identity, or otherwise made the life of LGBT people more difficult. The Rat has been awarded e.g. year 2008 to lord mayor Raimo Ilaskivi, MP Bjarne Kallis, and general Gustav Hägglund for their statements in the fuss caused by the puppet animation The Butterfly from Ural.

Seta also awards LGBTI Youth of the year and Active participant recognition to active members of members organizations.

== Member organizations ==
=== Regional organizations ===
- Akaa Pride
- Etelä-Savo Pride (South Savo)
- Eurajoki Pride
- Hamina Pride (Hamina)
- Helsinki Pride -yhteisö (Helsinki)
- Jyväskylän Seta (Jyväskylä)
- Kainuun Seta (Kainuu)
- Karkkila Pride
- Kestit (pääkaupunkiseutu)
- Lahden Seta (Lahti)
- Lakeuden Sateenkaari (South Ostrobothnia)
- Länsi-Uudenmaan Sateenkaariyhdistys (Western Uusimaa)
- Meri-Lapin Seta (Kemi-Tornio)
- Mäntsälän Seta (Mäntsälä)
- Nokia Pride (Nokia)
- Oulun Seta (Oulu)
- Oulu Pride (Oulu)
- Paimio Pride (Paimio)
- Pirkanmaan Seta Sinuiksi (Tampere)
- Pohjois-Karjalan Seta (North Karelia)
- Pohjois-Savon Seta (North Savo)
- Porvoon Seta (Porvoo)
- Qaareva (Helsinki)
- Qirjava (Joensuu)
- Raahe Pride -yhteisö
- Raisio Pride
- Raseborgs Regnbåge (Raseborg)
- Rauma Pride (Rauma)
- Regnbågsfyren (Mariehamn)
- Rovaniemen Seta (Rovaniemi)
- Saimaan Seta (Lappeenranta)
- Sastamala Pride
- Satakunnan Seta (Satakunta)
- Sempun akateeminen sateenkaarijärjestö Färikäs (Rauma)
- Skinnarilan Poikkitieteellinen Pride Yhdistys SkiPPY (Lappeenranta)
- Sodankylän Seta
- Tema (Helsinki urban area, in Russian)
- Turku Pride (Turku)
- Turun Seudun Mummolaakso (Turku area)
- Turun seudun Seta (Turku area)
- Vaasan Seta (Vaasa)
- Varkaus Pride

=== Nationwide organizations ===
- Dreamwear Club (transvestites, transfeminines)
- H.O.T. (sports)
- Kansallinen Sateenkaariryhmä – Kasary (National Coalition Party)
- Mummolaakso (lesbians and bi women)
- non-bin (non-binary and agender people)
- Polyamoria ja monisuhteisuus (polyamory)
- Regnbågsallians Svenskfinland (Finland Swedes)
- Sateenkaarihistorian ystävät (queer history)
- Sateenkaari-ikkuna (homelessness)
- Sateenkaariopettajat (queer teachers)
- Sateenkaariperheet (queer families)
- Sateenkaariseniorit (queer elderly)
- Sateenkaaritanssijat
- Sateenkaariyhdistys Malkus (spirituality)
- Suomen Sateenkaaripoliisit (queer police officers)
- Transfeminiinit (transfeminines)
- Translasten ja -nuorten perheet (families of trans youth)

== See also ==
- LGBT rights in Finland
- List of LGBT rights organizations
