= Tuula Väätäinen =

Finnish politician

Member of Finnish Parliament
- Incumbent
- Assumed office 17 April 2019
- In office March 19, 2003 – April 21, 2015
- Constituency: Savo-Karjala

Personal details
- Born: 2 October 1955 (age 71) Maaninka, Northern Savonia, Finland
- Party: Social Democratic Party
- Education: University of Kuopio

Tuula Anneli Väätäinen (née Häkkinen; born October 2, 1955, in Maaninka) is a Finnish politician. She has been elected as a member of parliament for the Social Democratic Party of Finland in the 2003, 2007, 2011 and 2019 elections. She currently lives in Siilinjärvi and has been involved with its municipal council since 1992. She initially trained as a nurse and studied family therapy at the University of Kuopio, after which she worked as a family therapist.
