= Pentti Oinonen =

Finnish politician

Member of the Finnish Parliament for Savonia-Karelia
- In office 22 April 2015 – 16 April 2019

Member of the Finnish Parliament for Northern Savonia
- In office 21 March 2007 – 21 April 2015

Personal details
- Born: 11 June 1952 (age 73) Kontiolahti, Finland
- Party: Blue Reform (2017–2019); Finns Party (until 2017)

Pentti Juhani Oinonen (born 11 June 1952 in Kontiolahti) is a Finnish politician and a former member of the Parliament of Finland, representing the Finns Party and later Blue Reform. He was elected to Finnish Parliament in 2007 for Northern Savonia, and maintained his seat in 2011. In 2015 Oinonen was re-elected again, this time for Savonia-Karelia.

On 13 June 2017, Oinonen and 19 others left the Finns Party parliamentary group to found the New Alternative parliamentary group, which later became known as Blue Reform. In March 2018, Oinonen announced that he was leaving politics and would not run in any future elections.
