= Markku Eestilä =

Finnish politician (born 1956)

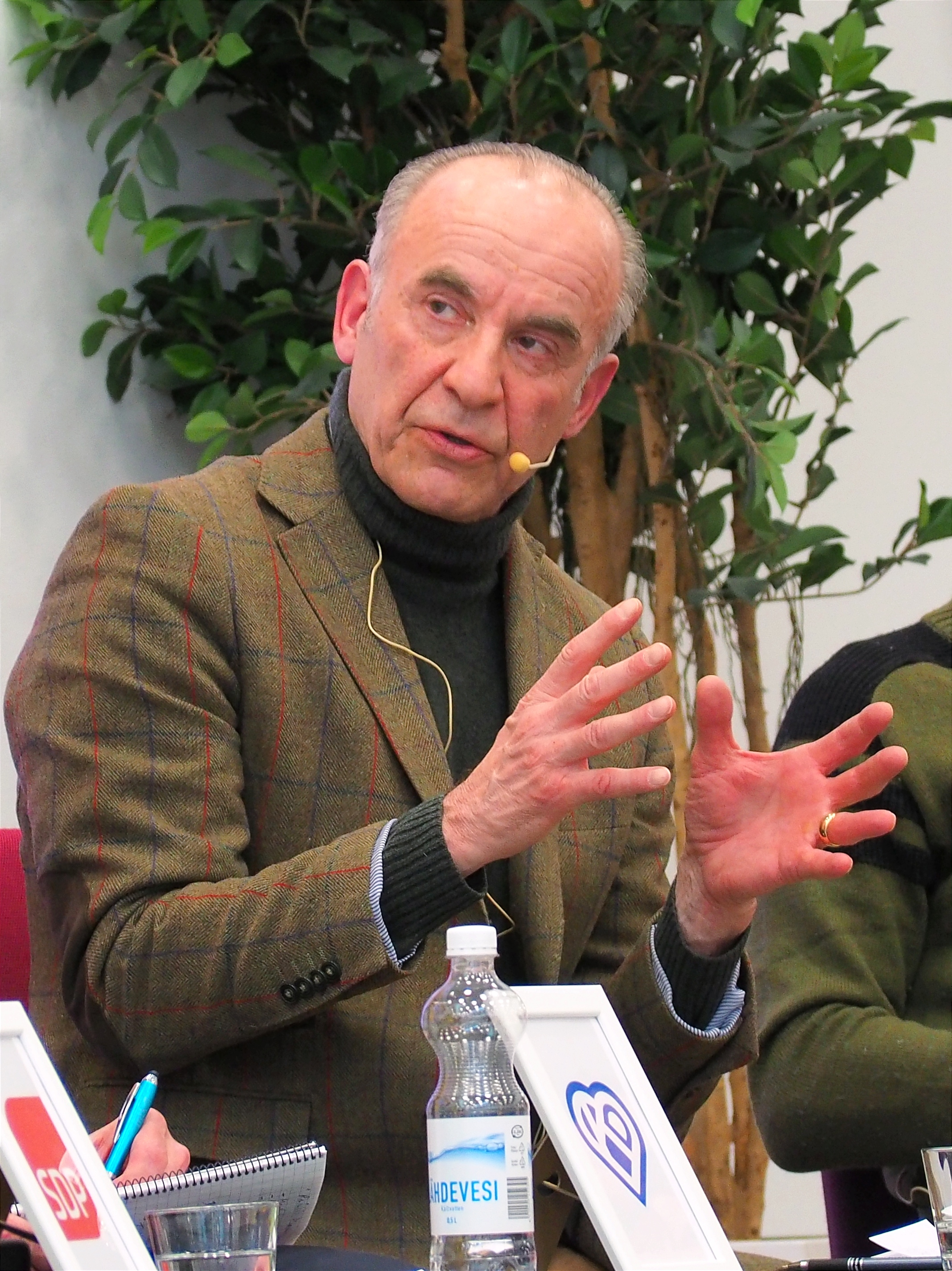
- Eestilä in 2023.

Member of the Finnish Parliament for Savonia-Karelia
- Incumbent
- Assumed office 20 April 2011

Personal details
- Born: July 23, 1956 (age 69) Iisalmi, Northern Savonia, Finland
- Party: National Coalition Party

Markku Yrjö Eestilä (born 23 July 1956 in Iisalmi) is a Finnish politician currently serving in the Parliament of Finland for the National Coalition Party at the Savonia-Karelia constituency.
