= Merja Mäkisalo-Ropponen =

Finnish politician

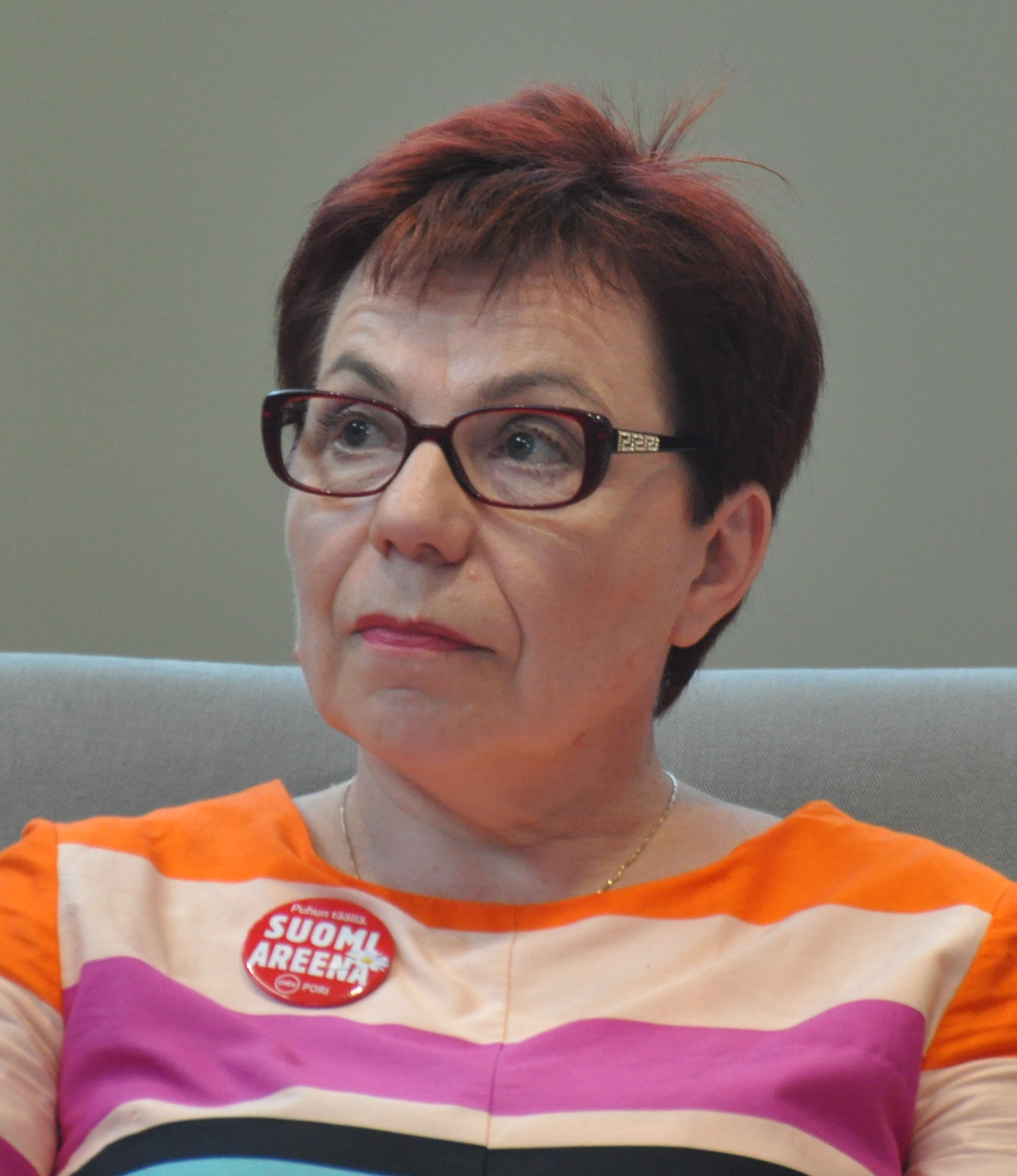
- Mäkisalo-Ropponen in 2015

Member of the Finnish Parliament for Savonia-Karelia

Personal details
- Born: April 20, 1958 (age 68) Tohmajärvi, North Karelia, Finland
- Party: Social Democratic Party of Finland

Merja Elina Mäkisalo-Ropponen (born 20 April 1958 in Tohmajärvi) is a Finnish politician currently serving in the Parliament of Finland for the Social Democratic Party of Finland at the Savonia-Karelia constituency.
