= Sanna Antikainen =

Finnish politician (born 1988)

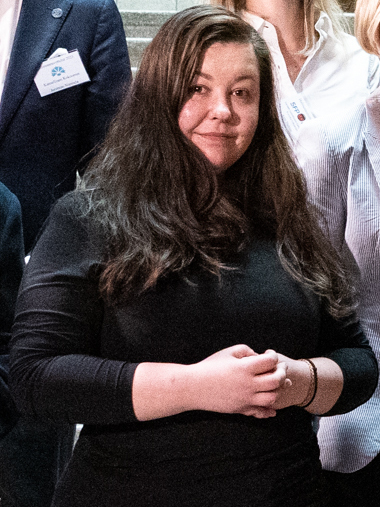
- Antikainen in June 2023.

Member of the Finnish Parliament for Savonia-Karelia
- Incumbent
- Assumed office 17 April 2019

Personal details
- Born: 3 October 1988 (age 37) Kuopio, Northern Savonia, Finland
- Party: Finns Party

Sanna Maarit Antikainen (born 3 October 1988 in Kuopio) is a Finnish politician currently serving in the Parliament of Finland for the Finns Party at the Savonia-Karelia constituency.
