= Hannu Hoskonen =

Finnish politician

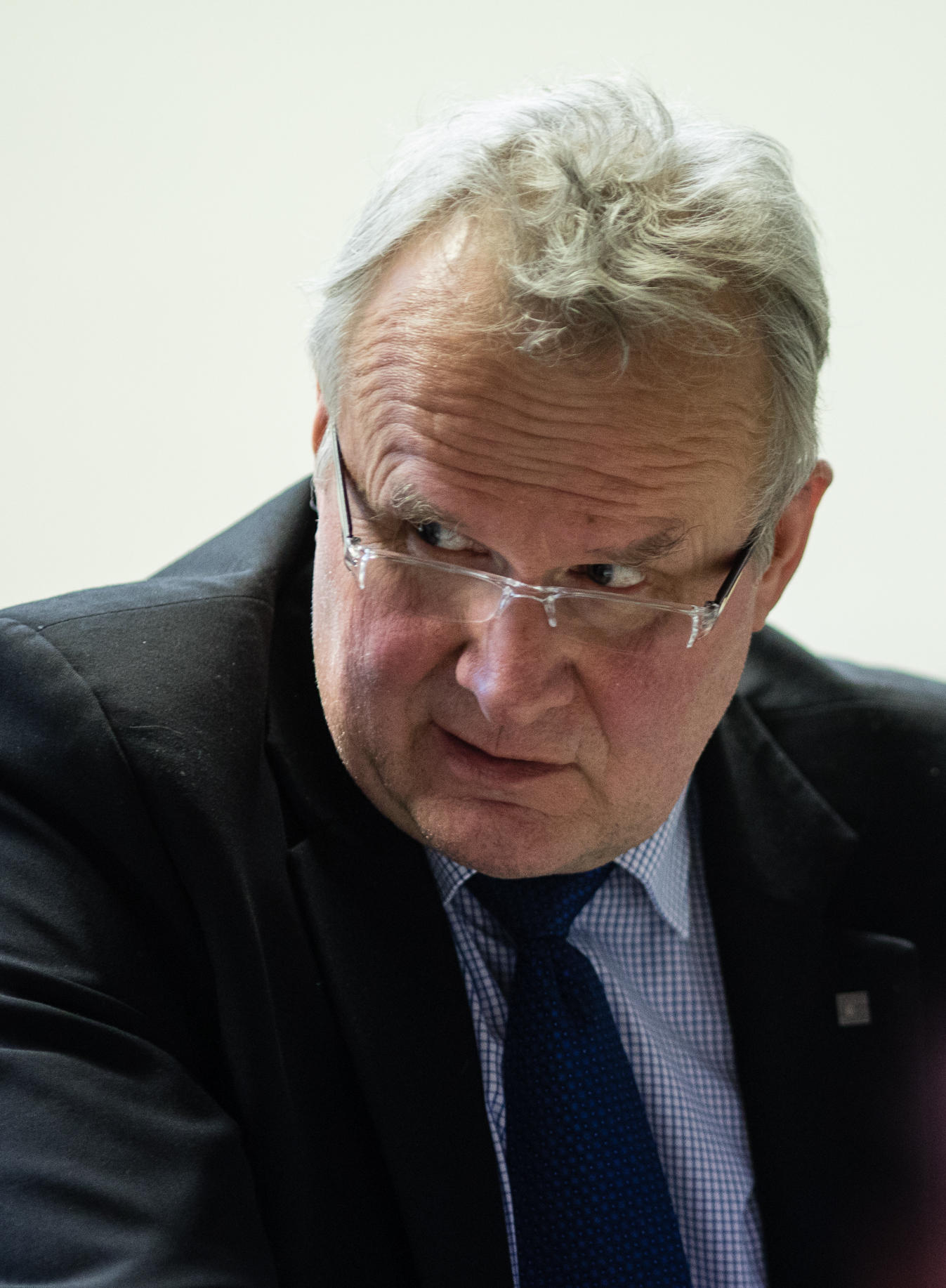

Member of the Finnish Parliament for Savonia-Karelia
- In office 19 March 2003 – 19 April 2011
- Incumbent
- Assumed office 22 April 2015

Personal details
- Born: 23 August 1957 (age 68) Ilomantsi, North Karelia, Finland
- Party: Centre Party

Hannu Tapio Hoskonen (born 23 August 1957 in Ilomantsi) is a Finnish politician currently serving in the Parliament of Finland for the Centre Party at the Savonia-Karelia constituency.
