= 2017 Finns Party leadership election =

Election for the Finns Party

- 10 June 2017 – 11 June 2017
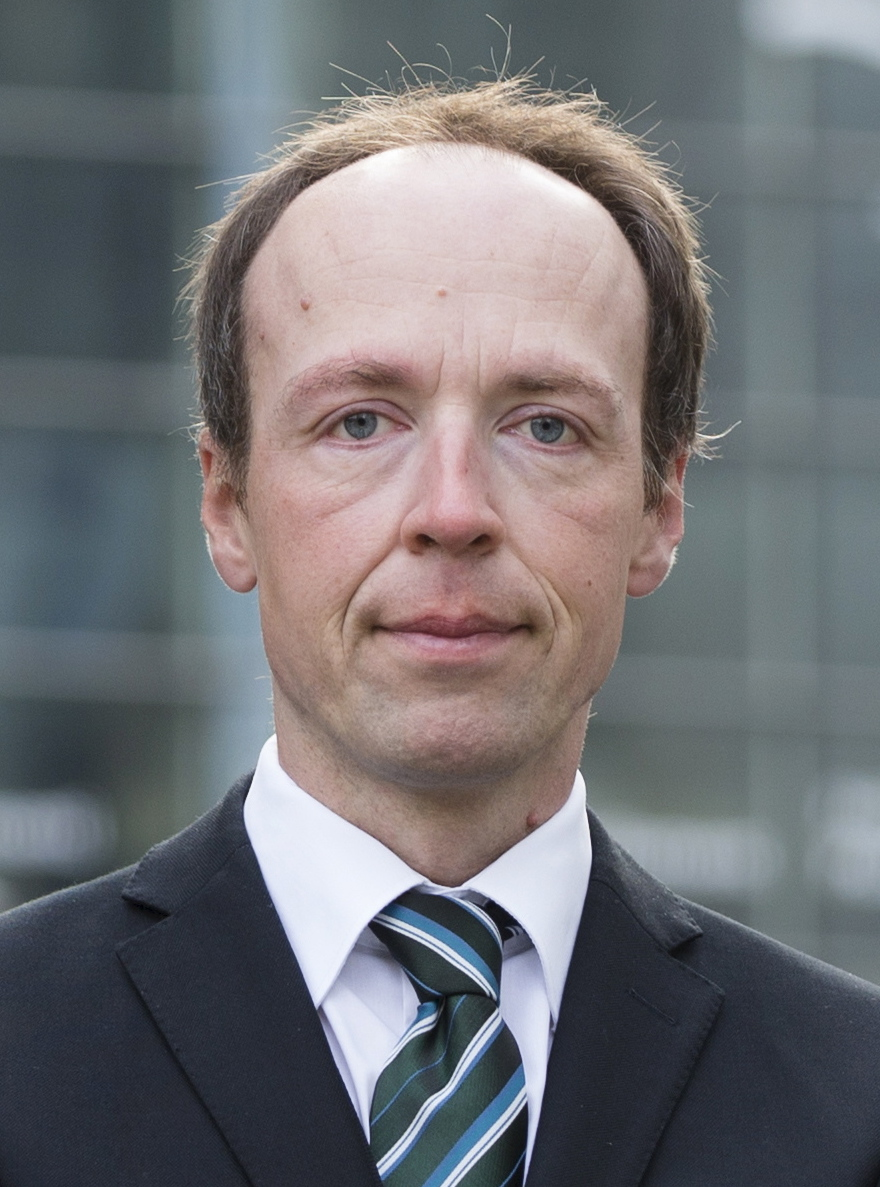

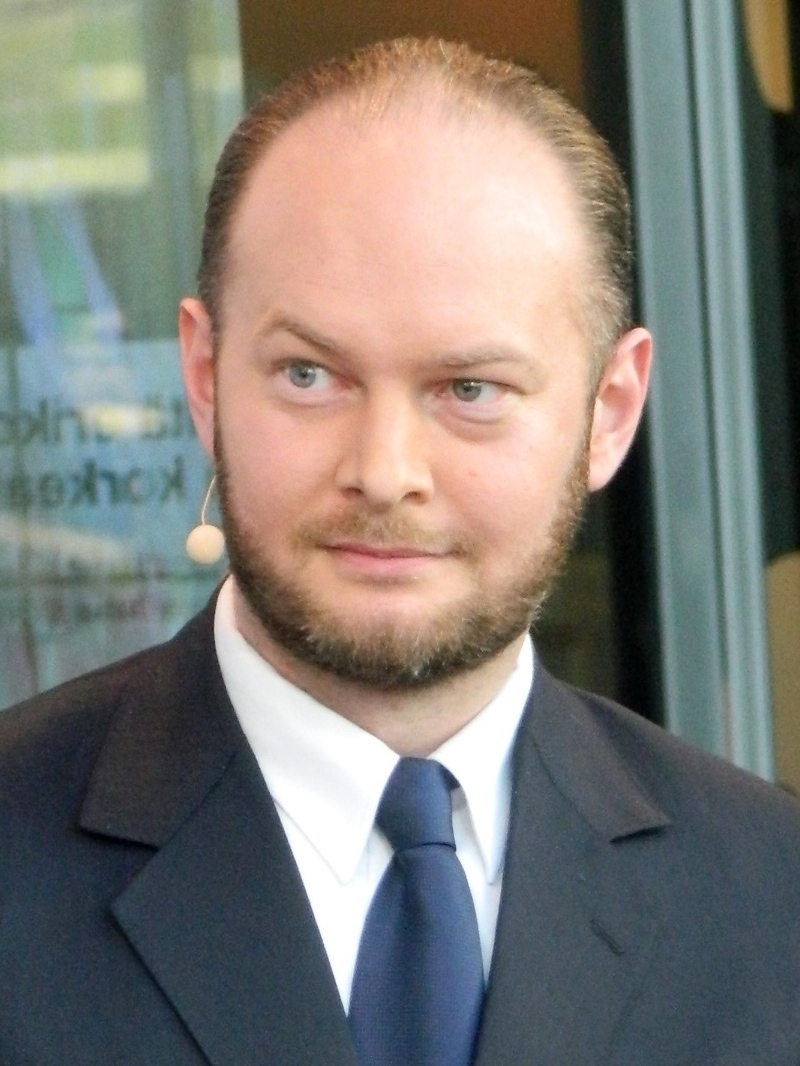
Candidate	Jussi Halla-aho	Sampo Terho
Votes won	949	629
Percentage	56.15%	37.22%
Leader of the Finns Party before election
Timo Soini
Elected Leader of the Finns Party
Jussi Halla-aho

The 2017 Finns Party leadership election was held in Jyväskylä, Finland, on June 10, 2017, to elect the new chair of the Finns Party. All members of the party who had paid their subscription were allowed to vote in the election.

The incumbent party chair, Timo Soini, who had led the party since 1997, did not run for the leadership this time. MEP Jussi Halla-aho and Sampo Terho, Minister for European Affairs, Culture and Sport, were considered the strongest candidates to succeed him. Leena Meri and Veera Ruoho, two Members of the Finnish Parliament, and Riku Nevanpää, a local politician, also ran for party chair. Raimo Rautiola, another local politician, initially stood for election but pulled out of the race on 5 June.

The election was won by Halla-aho, who received 949 votes in the first round, 56% of the total vote. Terho received 629 votes. In addition, Laura Huhtasaari was chosen as first deputy leader, while Teuvo Hakkarainen and Juho Eerola won the races for second and third deputy leader of the party, respectively. The incumbent party secretary Riikka Slunga-Poutsalo maintained her position after a vote.

These selections were characterised by the newspaper Helsingin Sanomat as a takeover by the anti-immigration wing of the Finns party, from the allegedly more moderate followers of former leader Soini. Halla-aho's rise to power was described as a "unique event in Finnish political history" by the Prime Minister and Centre Party leader Juha Sipilä. According to Bloomberg News, the results of the leadership election put the future of the ruling coalition in jeopardy. On 12 June, both Sipilä and NCP leader Petteri Orpo tweeted that, in their view, they could not carry on co-operating with the Halla-aho-led Finns Party. On 13 June, twenty Members of Parliament left the Finns Party parliamentary group and formed a new group of their own, called New Alternative (which later became a party called Blue Reform). Included in this group of defectors were former leader and Foreign Minister Soini, as well as all the other Finns Party Ministers (Terho, Jari Lindström, Jussi Niinistö, Pirkko Mattila) and Speaker of Parliament Maria Lohela.

== Notable endorsements ==
=== Jussi Halla-aho ===
- Teuvo Hakkarainen, MP for Central Finland.
- Laura Huhtasaari, MP for Satakunta.
- Olli Immonen, MP for Oulu.

=== Sampo Terho ===
- Jari Lindström, Minister for Labour, MP for Southeast Finland.
- Maria Lohela, Speaker of the Parliament, MP for Varsinais-Suomi.
- Jussi Niinistö, Minister for Defence, MP for Uusimaa.

== Opinion polls ==
Poll source	Survey dates				
Poll source	Survey dates	Halla-aho	Terho	Others	Undecided
Taloustutkimus	17 May 2017	40%	26%	9%	25%
Lännen Media	5 June 2017	42%	43%	6%	8%

== Results ==
Candidate	Votes	%
Jussi Halla-aho	949	56.15
Sampo Terho	629	37.22
Leena Meri	60	3.55
Veera Ruoho	44	2.60
Riku Nevanpää	8	0.47
Total	1,690	100.00
Valid votes	1,690	91.60
Invalid/blank votes	155	8.40
Total votes	1,845	100.00

== See also ==
- 2017 Finnish government crisis
- 2021 Finns Party leadership election
- Politics of Finland
