= 2017 Finnish government crisis =

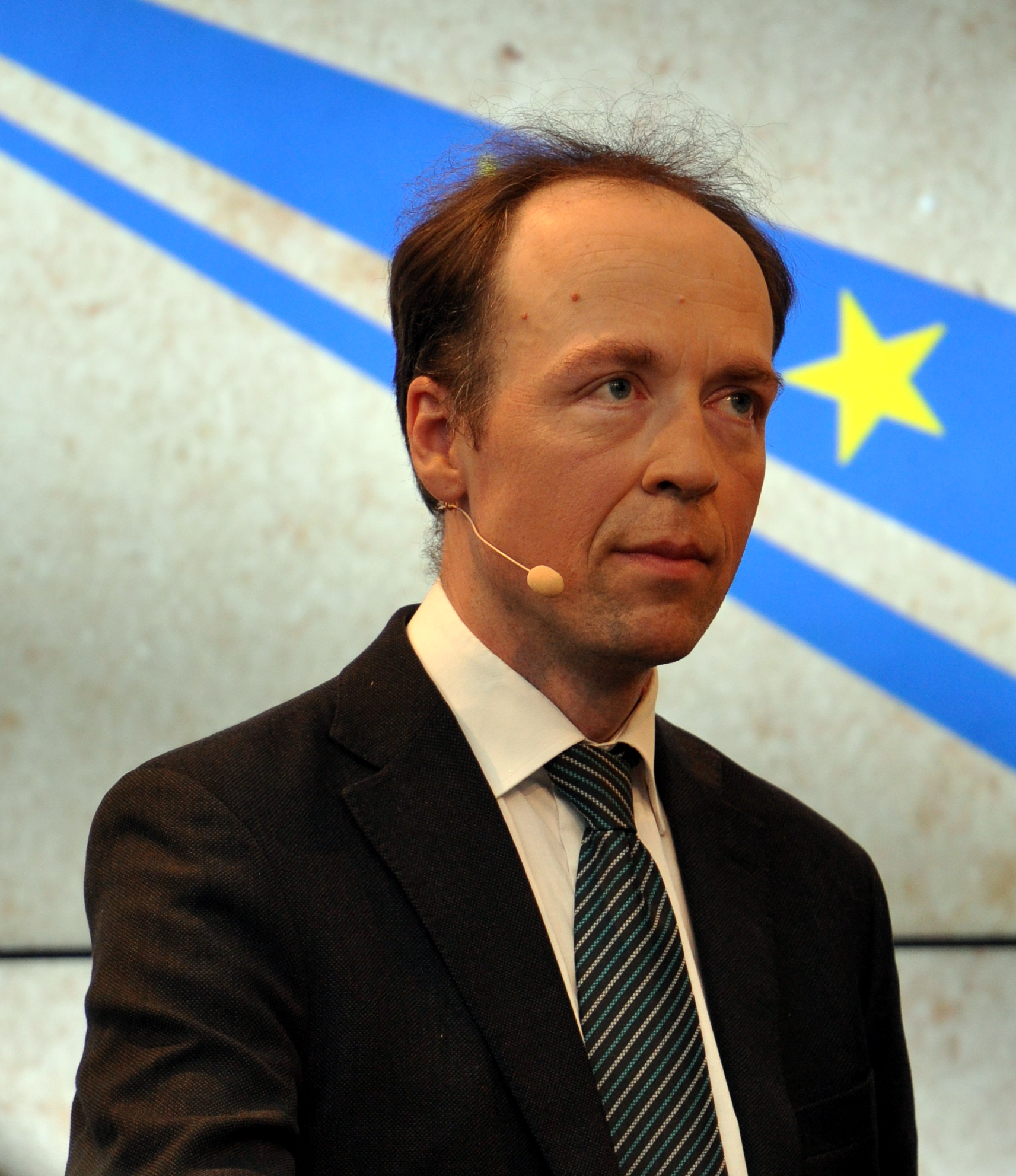
Jussi Halla-aho

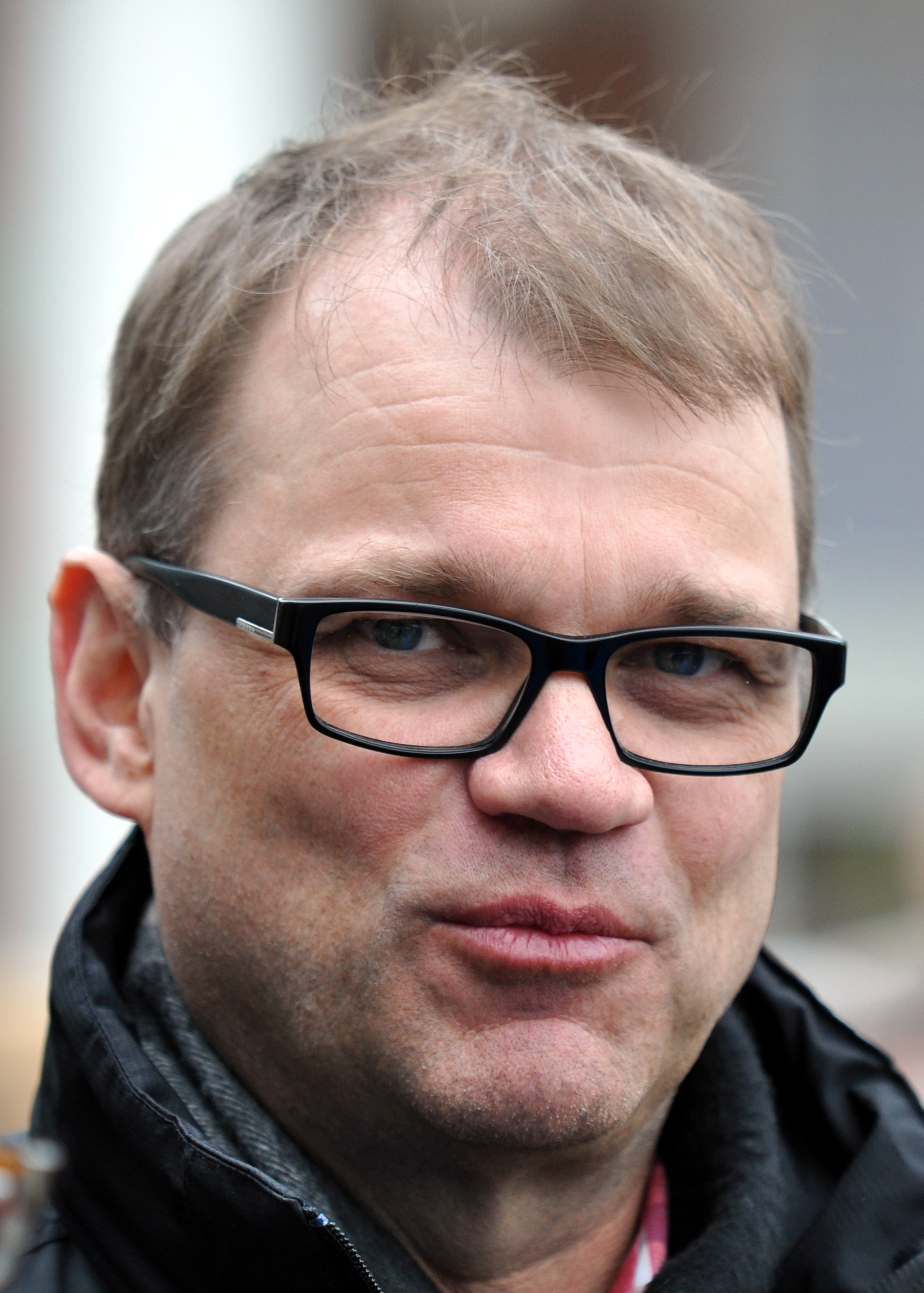
Juha Sipilä

The 2017 Finnish government crisis followed the Finns Party leadership election, held on 10 June 2017. Prime Minister Juha Sipilä (Centre Party) and Minister of Finance Petteri Orpo (National Coalition Party) announced on 12 June that they would no longer co-operate in a coalition government with the Finns Party after Jussi Halla-aho was elected as party chairman. The crisis resolved on 13 June, when twenty members of parliament defected from the Finns Party's parliamentary group, forming what would eventually become the Blue Reform party. Sipilä's government retained a majority of seats in Finland's parliament as members of parliament in Blue Reform continued being members in the coalition.

== Background ==
Prior to the crisis, the Finns Party had 37 MPs in the Parliament of Finland and was represented in the Sipilä cabinet by five ministers. Timo Soini, the long-time chair of the party and Minister for Foreign Affairs, announced in March 2017 that he would be stepping down at the upcoming party conference in Jyväskylä, scheduled for June. Sampo Terho, the Minister for European Affairs, Culture and Sport, and Jussi Halla-aho, a Member of the European Parliament, emerged as the strongest candidates to succeed Soini. The party establishment was believed to support Terho against Halla-aho, a hardline critic of immigration and multiculturalism.

In the leadership election on 10 June 2017, Halla-aho won the majority of the party members' votes in the first round, and was thus elected as chair of the Finns Party. On the same day, Laura Huhtasaari, Teuvo Hakkarainen and Juho Eerola, all aligned with Halla-aho, were elected as vice chairs of the party. Upon his election, Halla-aho pledged to take the party in a more nationalistic and Eurosceptic direction. The result was described a "revolution" by Helsingin Sanomat and Prime Minister Juha Sipilä stated that the Finns Party was not the same party as before.

== Events ==
In the morning of 12 June, Sipilä and Minister of Finance Petteri Orpo, the leaders of the Centre Party and National Coalition Party, respectively, negotiated on the continuation of the coalition government with Halla-aho at Kesäranta. Soon after, Sipilä and Orpo both tweeted out that they would not co-operate with Halla-aho's party. Ending the coalition with the Finns Party was accepted by the parliamentary groups of the Centre Party and the NCP.

It was expected that Sipilä would soon formally ask President Sauli Niinistö to remove his cabinet from office. Opposition leaders Ville Niinistö and Li Andersson demanded a snap election be held, but the Centre Party and the NCP were expected to form a new government with the Swedish People's Party and the Christian Democrats without a new election. This government coalition would have had 101 MPs, the narrowest possible parliamentary majority.

However, on 13 June, twenty MPs left the Finns Party parliamentary group, and formed a group called the New Alternative. Its members included Soini, Terho and all other cabinet ministers that had formerly represented the Finns Party. The New Alternative was willing to continue as a member of the government coalition, which was approved by Sipilä and Orpo and their respective parliamentary groups. The new government coalition had 106 MPs. The crisis did not cause changes to the composition of the Sipilä cabinet. On 19 June, Terho announced that a new party would be formed based on the New Alternative parliamentary group under the name Blue Reform.

== Views on the crisis ==
According to Halla-aho, Sipilä expelled the Finns Party from the government because he could not accept Halla-aho's demand to follow the immigration policy agreed in the government programme. Sipilä and Orpo said that they and Halla-aho did not share the same values. They additionally found it problematic that Halla-aho was going to lead his party from Brussels, instead of becoming a cabinet minister in Helsinki.

The Blue Reform members explained their departure from the Finns Party by alleging that Halla-aho's supporters had hijacked the party. Soini blamed the far-right nationalist group Suomen Sisu for the schism within the party. Tiina Elovaara, one of the defecting MPs, reported witnessing Halla-aho's supporters making Nazi salutes during the party conference in Jyväskylä, later specifying she was referring to a specific photograph taken at the conference. However, the accusation was later debunked as the picture was taken on the day following the election, and actually depicted participants engaging in show-of-hands voting. Halla-aho pointed out that he had been democratically elected chair by the Finns Party’s members.

== See also ==
- Cabinet crisis
- Politics of Finland
