= Leena Meri =

Finnish politician (born 1968)

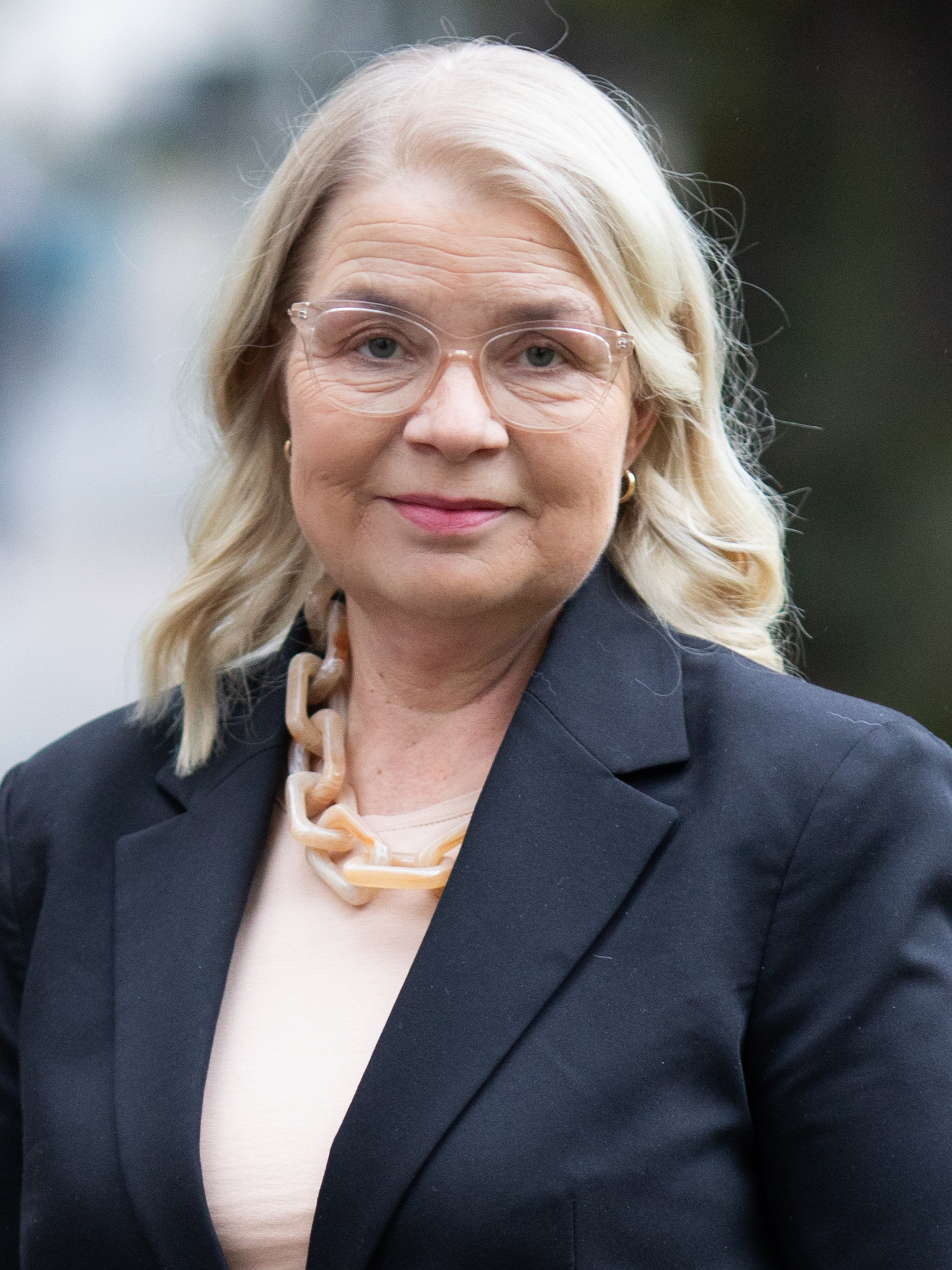
- Meri in 2023

Minister of Justice
- Incumbent
- Assumed office 20 June 2023
- Prime Minister: Petteri Orpo
- Preceded by: Anna-Maja Henriksson

Member of the Finnish Parliament
- Incumbent
- Assumed office 22 April 2015
- Constituency: Uusimaa

Personal details
- Born: 12 April 1968 (age 58) Helsinki, Uusimaa, Finland
- Party: Finns Party
- Education: University of Helsinki

Leena Kristiina Meri (born 12 April 1968) is a Finnish politician, representing the Finns Party in the Parliament of Finland. She has served in the Parliament since 2015 and in the City Council of Hyvinkää since 2013.

Meri ran for Parliament in the 2015 parliamentary election for the Uusimaa electoral district, but her 2,493 votes were not enough to get elected. However, as MP Pirkko Ruohonen-Lerner left her seat to work in the European Parliament in May 2015, Meri took the vacated seat in the Finnish Parliament. She later won a seat in the Uusimaa electoral district in her own right in the 2019 and 2023 parliamentary elections.

In June 2017, Meri took part in the leadership election of the Finns Party, but finished third behind Jussi Halla-aho and Sampo Terho. The leadership election sparked resistance within the party and soon after the majority of its MPs left to form the Blue Reform. After the split, Meri was chosen as the chair of the party's parliamentary group.

In June 2023, she was appointed Minister of Justice in the Orpo Cabinet.

== Political views ==
Meri opposes humanitarian immigration, arguing that it leads to an increase in violent crimes. She has stated that "the appropriate number of asylum seekers is zero". Meri has also suggested that the proposed immigration policy of the National Coalition party, their future partner in government, to increase the number of work permits for non-EU nationals resembles the Great Replacement. The use of this term has been criticized as racist by some media and the political opposition.

Political offices
Preceded by Anna-Maja Henriksson	Minister of Justice; 2023–present	Incumbent
