= Hanna Mäntylä =

Finnish politician (born 1974)

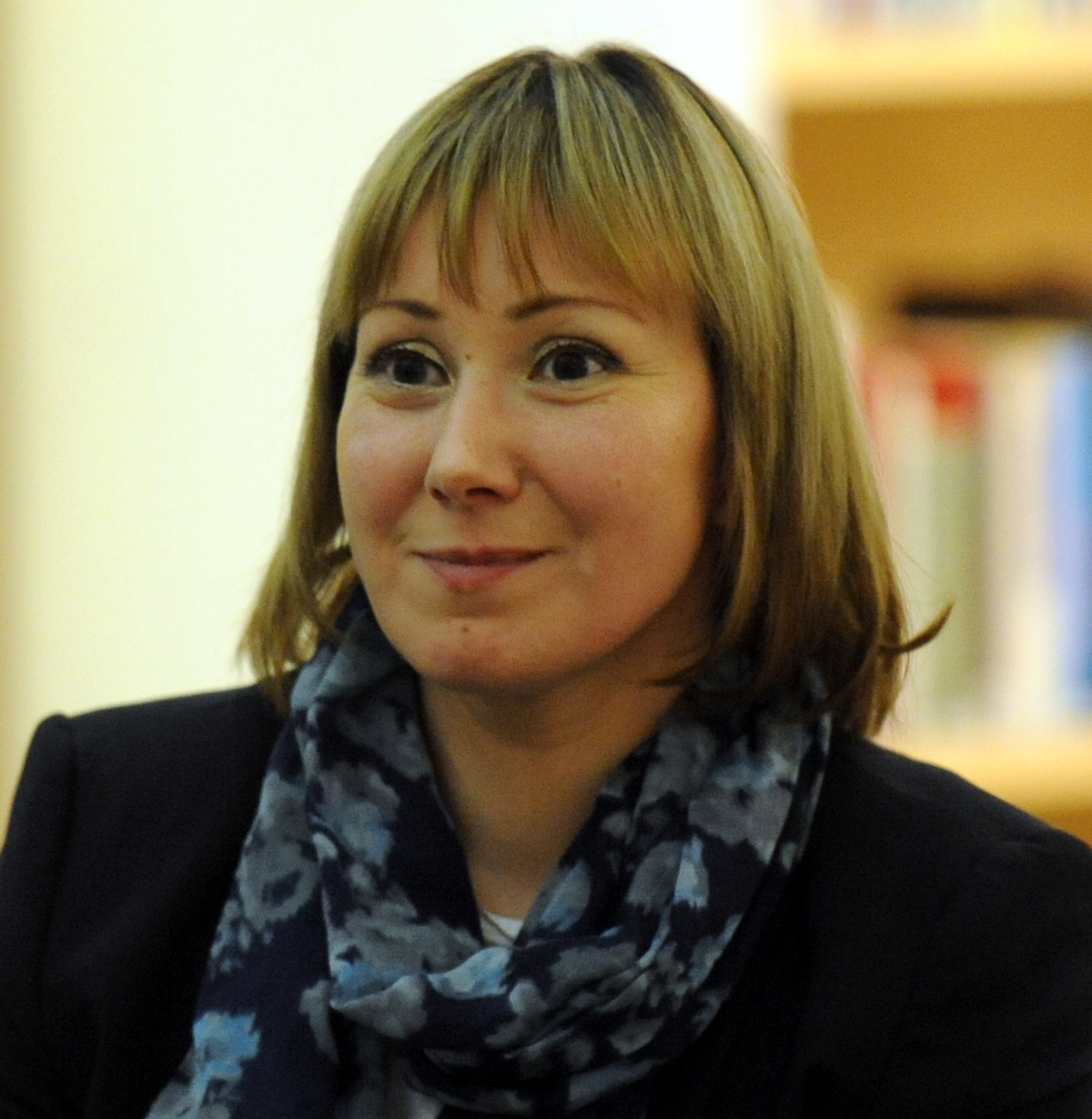

Minister of Social Affairs and Health
- In office 29 May 2015 – 25 August 2016
- Prime Minister: Juha Sipilä
- Preceded by: Laura Räty
- Succeeded by: Pirkko Mattila

Member of Finnish Parliament
- In office 20 April 2011 – 30 June 2017
- Succeeded by: Matti Torvinen
- Constituency: Lapland

Personal details
- Born: 19 September 1974 (age 52) Lahti, Finland
- Party: Independent
- Other political affiliations: Finns Party (until 2017)
- Education: University of Lapland
- Website: http://www.hannamantyla.fi

Hanna Katariina Mäntylä (born 19 September 1974) is a Finnish politician and the former Minister of Social Affairs and Health. She represented the Finns Party until June 2017 and was the second deputy chairwoman of the party. She was elected to the Parliament from Lapland in 2011. She maintained her seat in the 2015 parliamentary election. She was appointed Minister of Social Affairs and Health in May 2015.

On 16 August 2016, Mäntylä announced that she would leave her minister duties for personal reasons and will continue as a Member of Parliament.

On 13 June 2017, Mäntylä and 19 others left the Finns Party parliamentary group to found the New Alternative parliamentary group. On 21 June 2017, Mäntylä announced that she will leave the Parliament to work for the Council of Europe.

By profession, Mäntylä is a youth worker, and she has studied social work in the University of Lapland. Before her parliamentary career she was an entrepreneur, and operated a lingerie retail outlet.
