= Matti Torvinen =

Finnish politician

Member of the Finnish Parliament
- Incumbent
- Assumed office 1 July 2017
- Preceded by: Hanna Mäntylä
- Constituency: Lapland

Personal details
- Born: 30 January 1957 (age 69)
- Party: Blue Reform (2017–); Finns Party (until 2017)

Matti Torvinen (born 30 January 1957 in Rovaniemi) is a Finnish politician and the party secretary of the Blue Reform. He represented the Finns Party in the City Council of Rovaniemi since 2012, being elected in 2012 and 2017. Torvinen was a candidate in the 2015 parliamentary election, and the 2269 votes he gained were enough for a substitute place.

In June 2017, another MP Hanna Mäntylä left the Parliament, and it was confirmed that Torvinen will replace her on 1 July 2017. At the time, Finns Party's parliamentary group had split in two due to the aftermath of the recent leadership election. Torvinen joined the New Alternative, the faction that broke away from the Finns Party's parliamentary group. He subsequently resigned from the Finns Party.

On 15 November 2017, the New Alternative was officially registered as a political party under the name of Blue Reform. In the first party convention, organized on 16 December 2017, Torvinen was elected as the party secretary.
