= Raimo Vistbacka =

Finnish politician (born 1945)

Valtiopäiväneuvos (Counselor of Parliament) Raimo Vistbacka
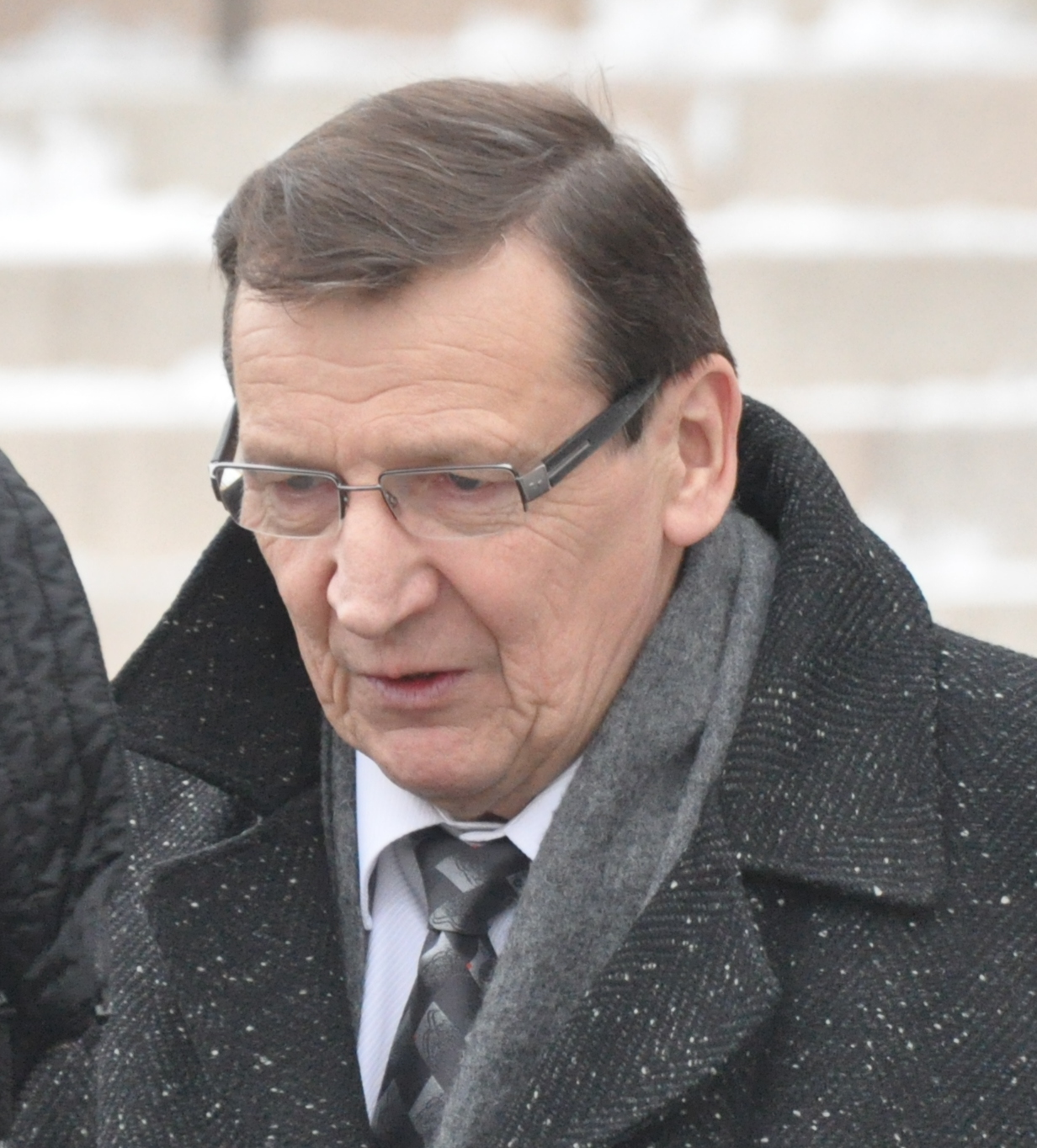
- Raimo Vistbacka in 2011.

Member of the Parliament of Finland for Vaasa
- In office 1987–2011

Minister of Transport
- In office 1 October 1989 – 28 August 1990
- Prime Minister: Harri Holkeri
- Preceded by: Pekka Vennamo
- Succeeded by: Ilkka Kanerva

Leader of the Finns Party
- In office 1995–1997
- Succeeded by: Timo Soini

Personal details
- Born: 19 October 1945 (age 80)
- Party: Blue Reform (2017–); Finns Party (1995–2017); Finnish Rural Party (until 1995)
- Occupation: Politician, police commissioner

Raimo Viljam Vistbacka (born 19 October 1945) is a Finnish politician and former member of the Finnish Parliament. Vistbacka has a master's degree in law (varatuomari) and he was the rural police chief (nimismies) in Alajärvi in 1982–1996. He was first elected to the parliament in 1987, representing the Finns Party's predecessor, the Finnish Rural Party. When the Finns Party was founded in 1995, Vistbacka became the party's first MP. He retired from the parliament in April 2011.

In 2010 Vistbacka said that he hopes that the Finns Party will not have more than 10–14 MPs (the total number of MPs in Finland is 200). Vistbacka believed that a bigger parliamentary group cannot be controlled.

Vistbacka left the Finns Party in 2017 and joined the Blue Reform. He was one of the Blue Reform candidates in the 2019 Finnish parliamentary election but was not elected.
