= Jussi Niinistö =

Finnish politician

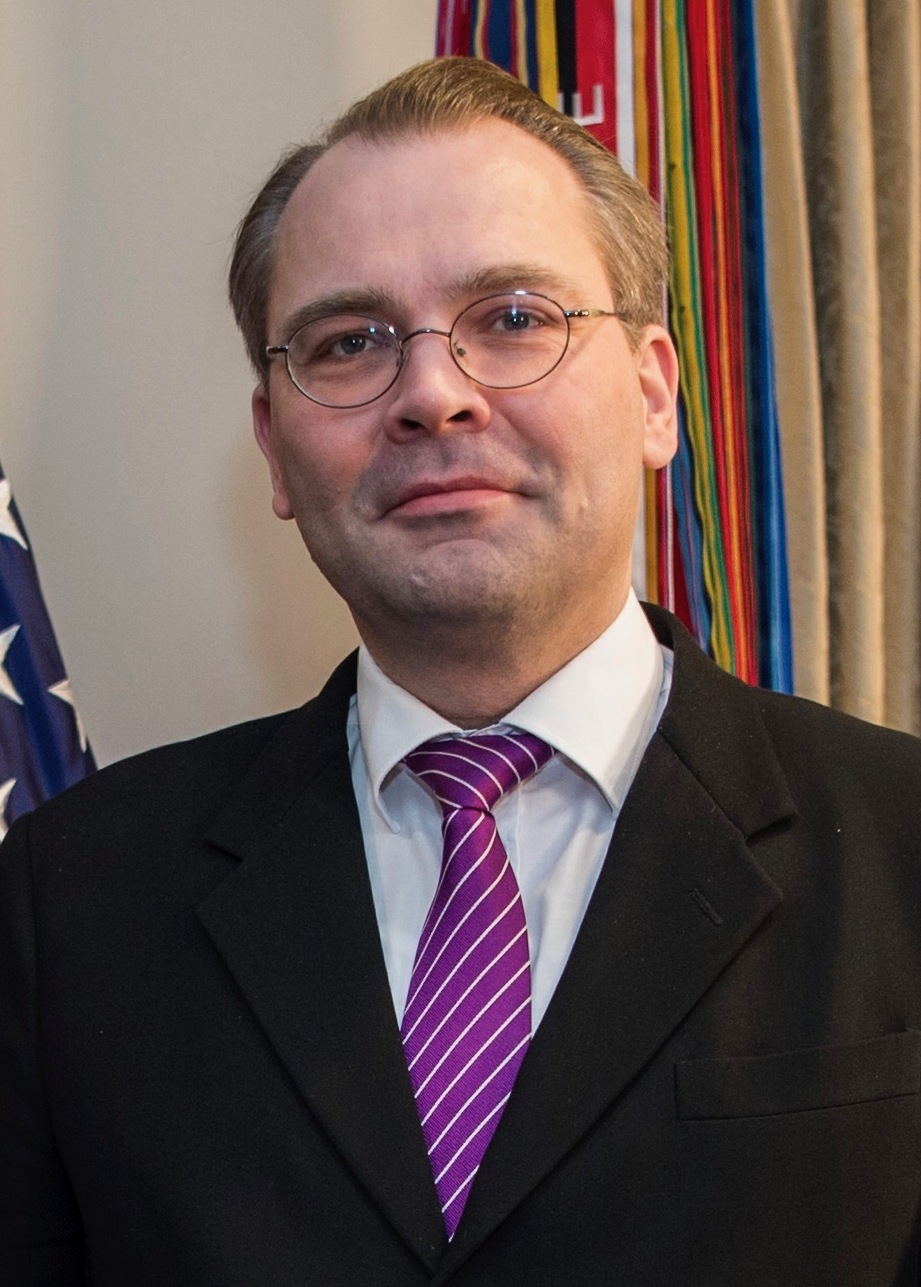

Minister of Defence
- In office 29 May 2015 – 6 June 2019
- Prime Minister: Juha Sipilä
- Preceded by: Carl Haglund
- Succeeded by: Antti Kaikkonen

Member of the Finnish Parliament
- In office 20 April 2011 – 16 April 2019
- Constituency: Uusimaa

Personal details
- Born: 27 October 1970 (age 55) Helsinki, Finland
- Party: Blue Reform
- Other political affiliations: Finns Party (until 2017)
- Spouses: Kati Niinistö (div. 2014) Leena Sharma (m. 2015)
- Education: University of Helsinki
- Occupation: Politician, academic (military historian)
- Website: jussiniinisto.fi

Military service
- Allegiance: Finland
- Branch/service: Finnish Army
- Years of service: 1989–1990
- Rank: Senior lieutenant

Jussi Niinistö (born 27 October 1970) is a Finnish politician and a former Minister of Defence and a former member of Finnish Parliament, representing the Finns Party 2011–2017 and Blue Reform since 2017. By occupation he is a military historian, a docent of Finnish history in the University of Helsinki and a docent of military history in the Finnish National Defence University. In 2013 he was elected as the first vice-chairman of the True Finns, but lost his seat in 2017.

Niinistö was a member of the municipal council of Nurmijärvi 2009–2015 and the chairman of the Finns Party deputy group of the council 2009–2014. In August 2015, Niinistö moved to Helsinki and left the municipal council. In the 2017 municipal elections Niinistö was elected to the City Council of Helsinki.

On 13 June 2017, Niinistö and 19 others left the Finns Party parliamentary group to found the New Alternative parliamentary group, which would later become the Blue Reform party. He took part in the 2019 parliamentary election as a candidate of the Blue Reform, but was not elected.

Niinistö has criticized the Ottawa Treaty which prohibits the use of Land mines and has argued that Finland should leave the treaty.

Jussi Niinistö is not related to President Sauli Niinistö nor his nephew, Green MP Ville Niinistö, and their family names have different origins.

In June 2020 Niinistö was elected as town manager of the small town of Kannus.

== Publications ==
- Paavo Susitaival 1896–1993. Aktivismi elämänasenteena. Bibliotheca Historica 29. Helsinki: Suomen Historiallinen Seura, 1998. ISBN 951-710-077-9.
- Suomalaisia soturikohtaloita. Jyväskylä: Suomalaisuuden liitto, 1998. ISBN 951-96348-5-1.
- Kiinteistöjen liputustieto. Helsinki: Suomalaisuuden liitto, 1999. ISBN 951-96348-6-X.
- Niinistö, Jussi & Mattila, Jukka I.: Pohjan Pojat. Kuvahistoria suomalaisen vapaaehtoisrykmentin vaiheista Viron vapaussodassa 1919. Helsinki: LAK-Kustannus, 1999. ISBN 951-98147-0-1.
- Bobi Sivén. Karjalan puolesta. Helsinki: Suomalaisen Kirjallisuuden Seura, 2001. ISBN 951-746-241-7.
- Suomalaisia vapaustaistelijoita. Sotilasperinteen seuran julkaisusarja nro 9. Helsinki: Nimox, 2003. ISBN 952-5485-00-5.
- Lapuan Liike. Kuvahistoria kansannoususta 1929–1932. Helsinki: Nimox Ky, 2003. ISBN 952-5485-01-3.
- Heimosotien historia 1918–1922. Suomalaisen Kirjallisuuden Seuran toimituksia 1007. Helsinki: Suomalaisen Kirjallisuuden Seura, 2005. ISBN 951-746-687-0.
- "Suomalaisuuden Liiton vaiheita 1906–2006", teoksessa Tala, Heikki (päätoim.): Vuosisata suomalaisuuden puolesta: Suomalaisuuden liitto 1906–2006. Helsinki: Suomalaisuuden liitto, 2006. ISBN 951-96348-7-8.
- Eteläpohjalaiset ja Suomen vapaustaistelu, Rauhan ajan suojeluskunta- ja lottajärjestöt, Eteläpohjalaiset talvi- ja jatkosodassa sekä Tyytymättömän oikeiston tukialue -nimiset luvut (yhteensä 127 sivua) kokoomateoksessa Etelä-Pohjanmaan historia VII (Etelä-Pohjanmaan liitto. Toim. Raimo Salokangas. Vaasa 2006)
- Isontalon Antti. Eteläpohjalainen jääkäri, värväri ja seitsemän sodan veteraani. Helsinki: Suomalaisen Kirjallisuuden Seura, 2008. ISBN 978-951-746-979-1.
- hundreds of articles related to history and social affairs, columns and book evaluations in different magazines.

== Sources ==
Political offices
Preceded by Carl Haglund	Minister of Defence; 2015–2019	Succeeded by Antti Kaikkonen
