= Sampo Terho =

Finnish politician

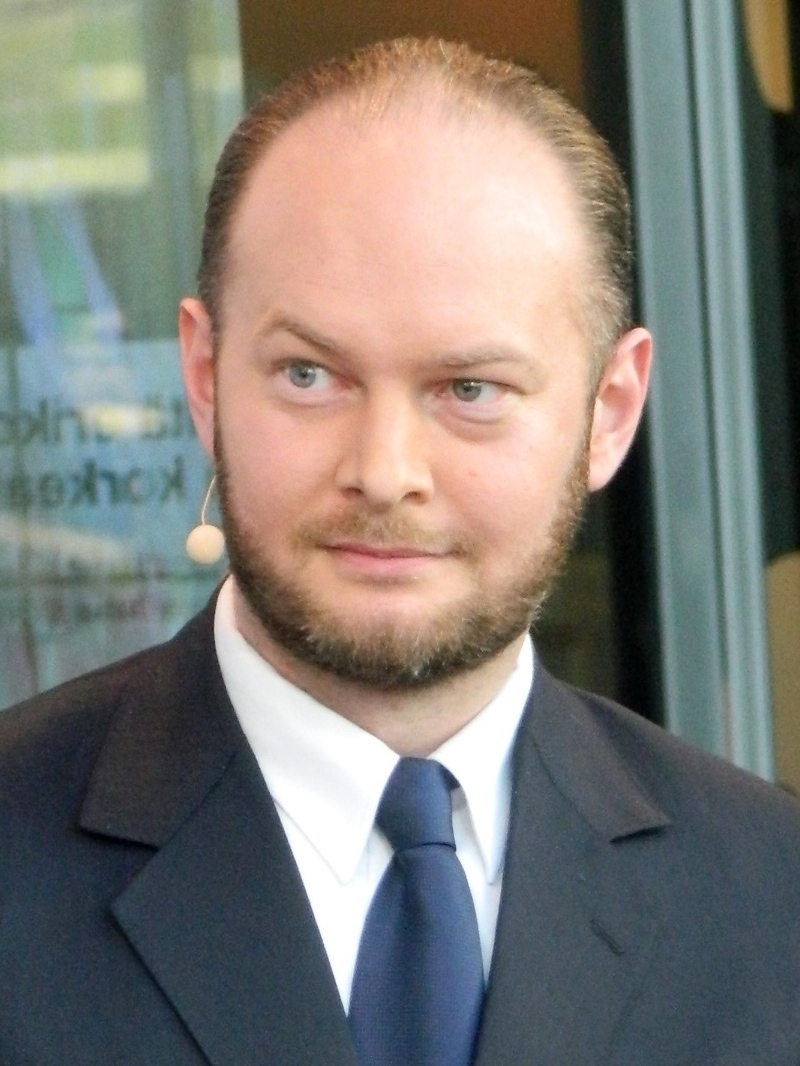

Minister for European Affairs, Culture and Sports
- In office 5 May 2017 – 6 June 2019
- Prime Minister: Juha Sipilä
- Preceded by: Timo Soini (European Affairs); Sanni Grahn-Laasonen (Education and Culture)
- Succeeded by: Tytti Tuppurainen (European Affairs); Annika Saarikko (Science and Culture)

Member of Parliament for Helsinki
- In office 22 April 2015 – 14 April 2019

Member of the European Parliament for Finland
- In office 19 April 2011 – 27 April 2015
- Succeeded by: Pirkko Ruohonen-Lerner

Personal details
- Born: 20 September 1977 (age 49) Helsinki, Finland
- Party: Blue Reform (since 2017); Finns Party (until 2017)
- Education: University of Tampere
- Website: Official website

Sampo Johannes Terho (born 20 September 1977) is a Finnish politician who served as Minister for European Affairs, Culture and Sports. He was the chairman of Suomalaisuuden Liitto and was earlier a Member of the European Parliament.

== Life and career ==
Terho graduated from the University of Tampere in 2003 with a Master's degree in Finnish History and has worked as a researcher at the Finnish National Defence University. He has written a book on the history of capital punishment. Terho has also served as a peacekeeper in Bosnia & Herzegovina. Terho received the second largest number of votes on the Finns Party (then known as the True Finns) electoral list in the 2009 European Parliament elections. He succeeded Timo Soini in the European Parliament when Soini was elected to the Parliament of Finland in the 2011 elections. He was re-elected in the 2014 elections.

Terho participated in the 2015 parliamentary elections and was elected to the parliament with 10,067 personal votes. His term in the European Parliament ended on 27 April, when Terho officially accepted the seat in the Finnish Parliament. He subsequently became the chairman of the Finns Party's parliamentary group. On 5 May 2017, he started as the Minister for European Affairs, Culture and Sports in the Sipilä Cabinet.

In 2017, Terho ran against Jussi Halla-aho for party chairmanship, but ultimately lost the chairmanship election at the party convention on 10 June. On 13 June, Terho and 19 others left the Finns Party parliamentary group to found the New Alternative parliamentary group which was turned into a new party known as Blue Reform. After the split, the New Alternative group took the Finns Party's place in the cabinet and Terho continued as a Minister.

In the 2019 parliamentary elections, Terho was a candidate of the Blue Reform in the Uusimaa constituency, but was not elected. After leaving politics, Terho became a writer and published his first book Olev Roosin kyyneleet in January 2021.

Terho wrote a chamber music piece, of around five minutes long, to celebrate Finland's 100 years of independence, for the Kuopio City Orchestra. The piece is arranged by Terho, with conductor Heikki Elo, who together have orchestrated it.

== Electoral history ==
=== Chairmanship election ===
Year	Party	Votes	Percentage	Result
2017	Finns Party	629	37.22%	Not elected

=== European Parliament elections ===
Year	Constituency	Votes	Percentage	Result
2009	Finland	9,374	0.56%	Substitute
2014	Finland	33,833	1.96%	Elected

=== Parliamentary elections ===
Year	Constituency	Votes	Percentage	Result
2015	Helsinki	10,067	2.80%	Elected
2019	Uusimaa	3,118	0.57%	Not elected

=== Municipal elections ===
Year	Municipality	Votes	Percentage	Result
2017	Helsinki	3,381	1.04%	Elected

== Political views ==
According to Terho himself, his mission in life is to dismantle socialism.

== Personal life ==
Terho was married to Maija Sihvonen from 2011 until their divorce in 2019. They have one child together.
