= Jari Lindström =

Finnish politician

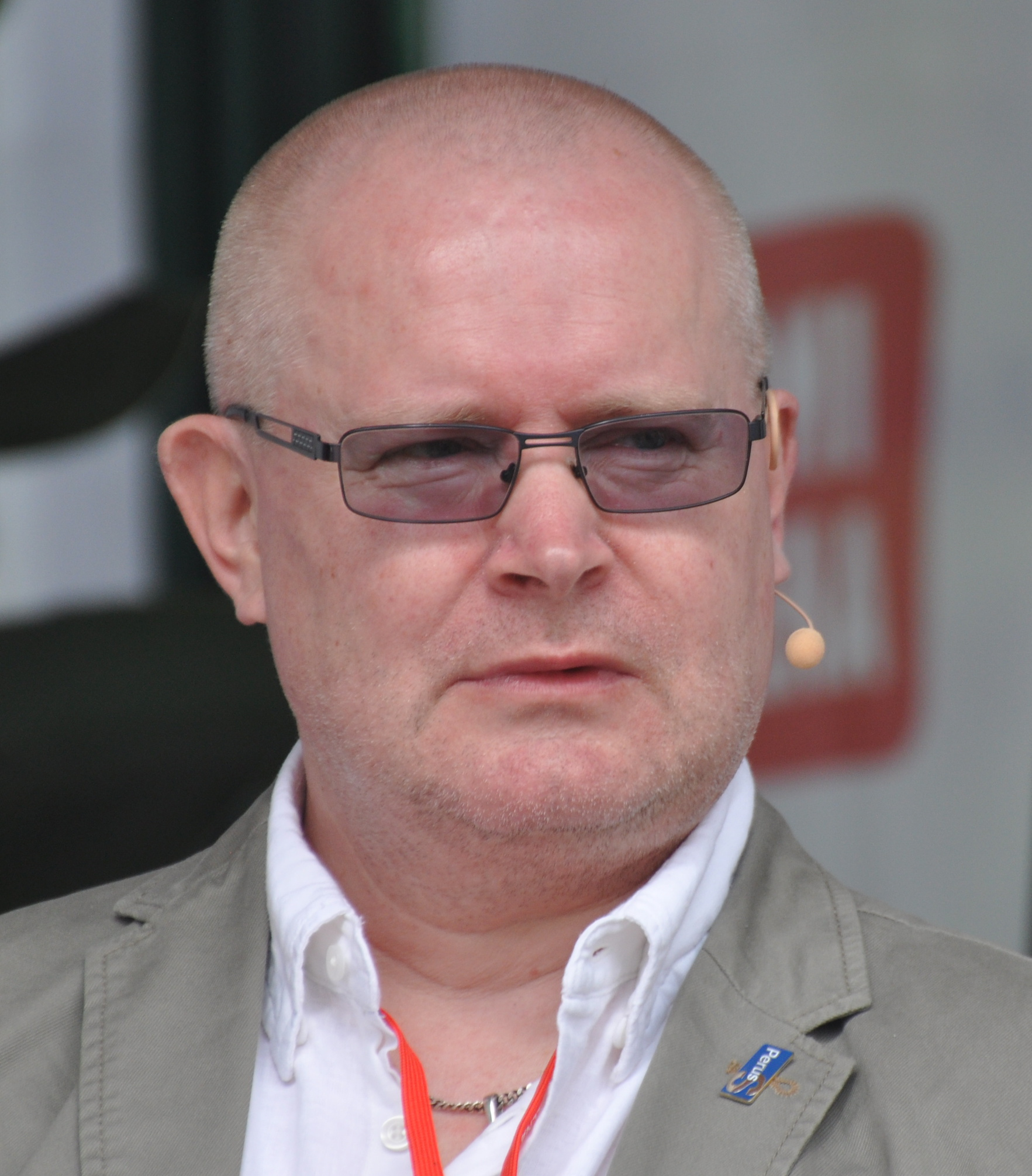

Minister of Employment
- In office 29 May 2015 – 6 June 2019
- Prime Minister: Juha Sipilä
- Preceded by: Lauri Ihalainen
- Succeeded by: Timo Harakka

Minister of Justice
- In office 29 May 2015 – 5 May 2017
- Prime Minister: Juha Sipilä
- Preceded by: Anna-Maja Henriksson
- Succeeded by: Antti Häkkänen

Member of the Finnish Parliament
- In office 20 April 2011 – 16 April 2019
- Constituency: Kymi (2011–2015); South-Eastern Finland (2015–2019)

Personal details
- Born: Jari Tapani Lindström; 28 June 1965 (age 60) Kuusankoski, Finland (now Kouvola)
- Party: Blue Reform (2017–); Finns (until 2017)
- Spouse: Outi Lindström (m. 2001)

Jari Tapani Lindström (born 28 June 1965) is a Finnish politician and former Minister of Employment. He represented the Finns Party till 2017 and was first elected to the Parliament in 2011 in the former constituency of Kymi. In 2014, Lindström was appointed the chairman of the Finns Party parliamentary group. In the 2015 elections he maintained his seat, standing in the newly formed South-Eastern constituency. He was appointed as both Minister of Justice and Minister of Employment in May 2015.

On 13 June 2017, Lindström and 19 others left the Finns Party parliamentary group to found the New Alternative parliamentary group, which later formed into a political party called Blue Reform. Lindström took part in the 2019 parliamentary election as a candidate of the Blue Reform, but was not elected.

Lindström worked at a paper mill and is also a qualified laboratory technician. He has voiced his support for capital punishment under certain circumstances.

In 2020 Lindström published his memoirs Syvään päähän where he reflected his time as both MP and minister, and also the splitting of the Finns Party in 2017.
