= Veera Ruoho =

Finnish police officer, politician and taekwondo athlete

Veera Marita Ruoho (née Liukkonen; born 4 August 1969 in Hirvensalmi) is a Finnish politician and an Olympic Taekwondo practitioner.

She participated in the Women's Heavyweight competition in Taekwondo at the 2000 Summer Olympics in Sydney, Australia, losing in the first round to Canadian Dominique Bosshart.

She was elected to parliament representing the Finns Party in April 2015. She left the party in June 2017 after the election of an ultra-nationalist as its leader, and subsequently announced that she would join the National Coalition Party led by Petteri Orpo. Ruoho took part in the 2019 parliamentary election as a candidate of the National Coalition Party, but was not re-elected.

She was a police officer before entering politics.
