= Lauri Ihalainen =

Finnish politician (born 1947)

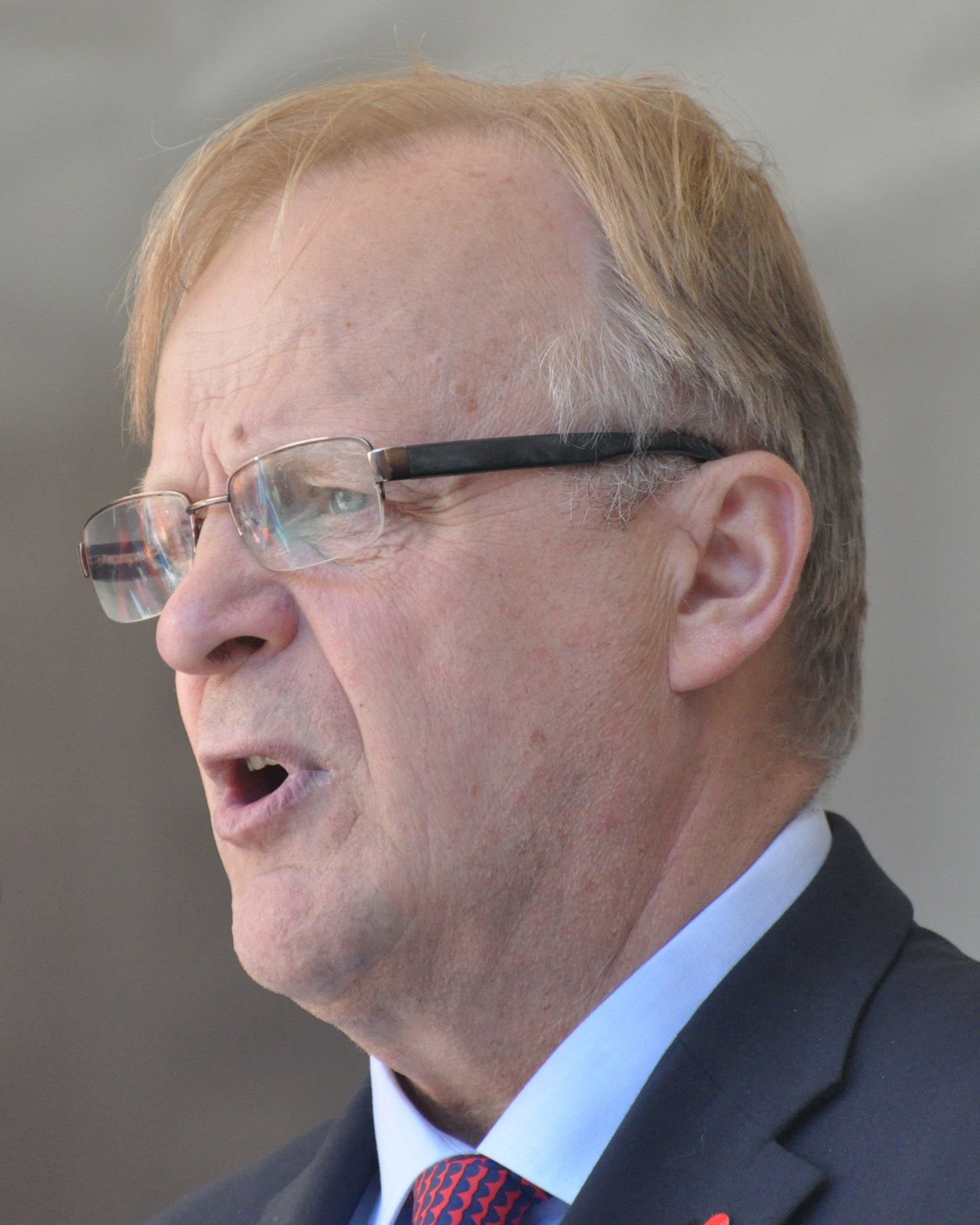

Minister of Labour
- In office 22 June 2011 – 29 May 2015
- Prime Minister: Jyrki Katainen; Alexander Stubb
- Preceded by: Anni Sinnemäki
- Succeeded by: Jari Lindström

Personal details
- Born: Lauri Armas Ihalainen; 14 May 1947 (age 79) Pihtipudas, Finland
- Party: Social Democratic

Lauri Ihalainen (born 14 May 1947) is a Finnish trade union leader and politician who served as the Minister of Labour between 2011 and 2015.

== Early life ==
Ihalainen was born in Pihtipudas on 14 May 1947.

== Career ==
Ihalainen is a member of the Social Democratic Party. He joined the Central Organization of Finnish Trade Unions (SAK) on 5 November 1970 and became the SAK youth secretary on 15 November. Later he was appointed the SAK organization secretary and then the SAK secretary. He became the president of the SAK on 25 May 1990, replacing Pertti Viinanen in the post. He was in office for 18 eighteen years until May 2009.

He was also the deputy chairman of Ilmarinen Mutual Pension Insurance company. In addition, he served as the director of Metsämiehen Säätiö, southern region of Finnish Ice Hockey Association, Orders of the Finnish White Rose and Finnish Lion, director of VR Group Ltd. and director at Solidium Oy. He was also the board member of the Sanoma corporation from 2009 to 2011. He became a member of the Finnish parliament in the general elections of 2011. Ihalainen was appointed minister of labour to the cabinet led by Prime Minister Jyrki Katainen on 22 June 2011. Ihalainen's tenure ended in May 2015 when Jari Lindström was appointed to the post.

== Personal life ==
Ihalainen is married and has two children.
