= Kaj Turunen =

Finnish politician

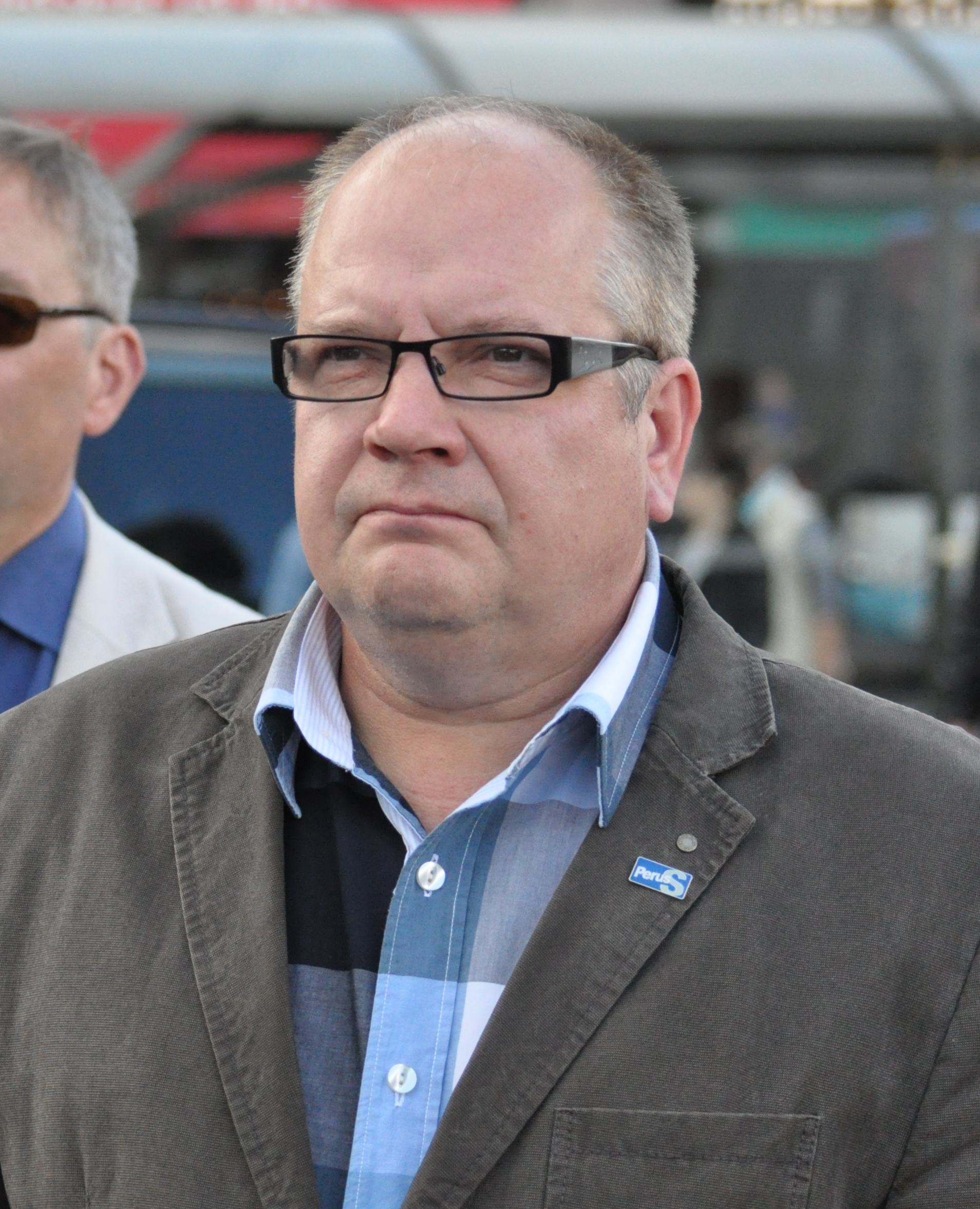
- Kaj Turunen in 2011

Member of Finnish Parliament for South-Eastern Finland
- In office 22 April 2015 – 16 April 2019

Member of Finnish Parliament for Southern Savonia
- In office 20 April 2011 – 21 April 2015

Personal details
- Born: 27 December 1960 (age 65) Lohja, Finland
- Party: National Coalition Party

Kaj Valentin Turunen (born 27 December 1960]) is a Finnish politician. Turunen was elected to the Finnish Parliament in the 2011 election as a the Finns Party candidate from the electoral district of Southern Savonia with 2,631 votes. In 2015, he won a seat in South-Eastern Finland.

On 13 June 2017, Turunen and 19 others left the Finns Party parliamentary group to found the New Alternative parliamentary group. In April 2018, he left the party to join the National Coalition Party.

Turunen has a professional education as a construction worker (1978, Jyväskylän ammattikoulu), and has further professional qualifications in entrepreneurship (2008) and leadership (2011), both from JAMK University of Applied Sciences.
