= Pirkko Mattila =

Finnish politician

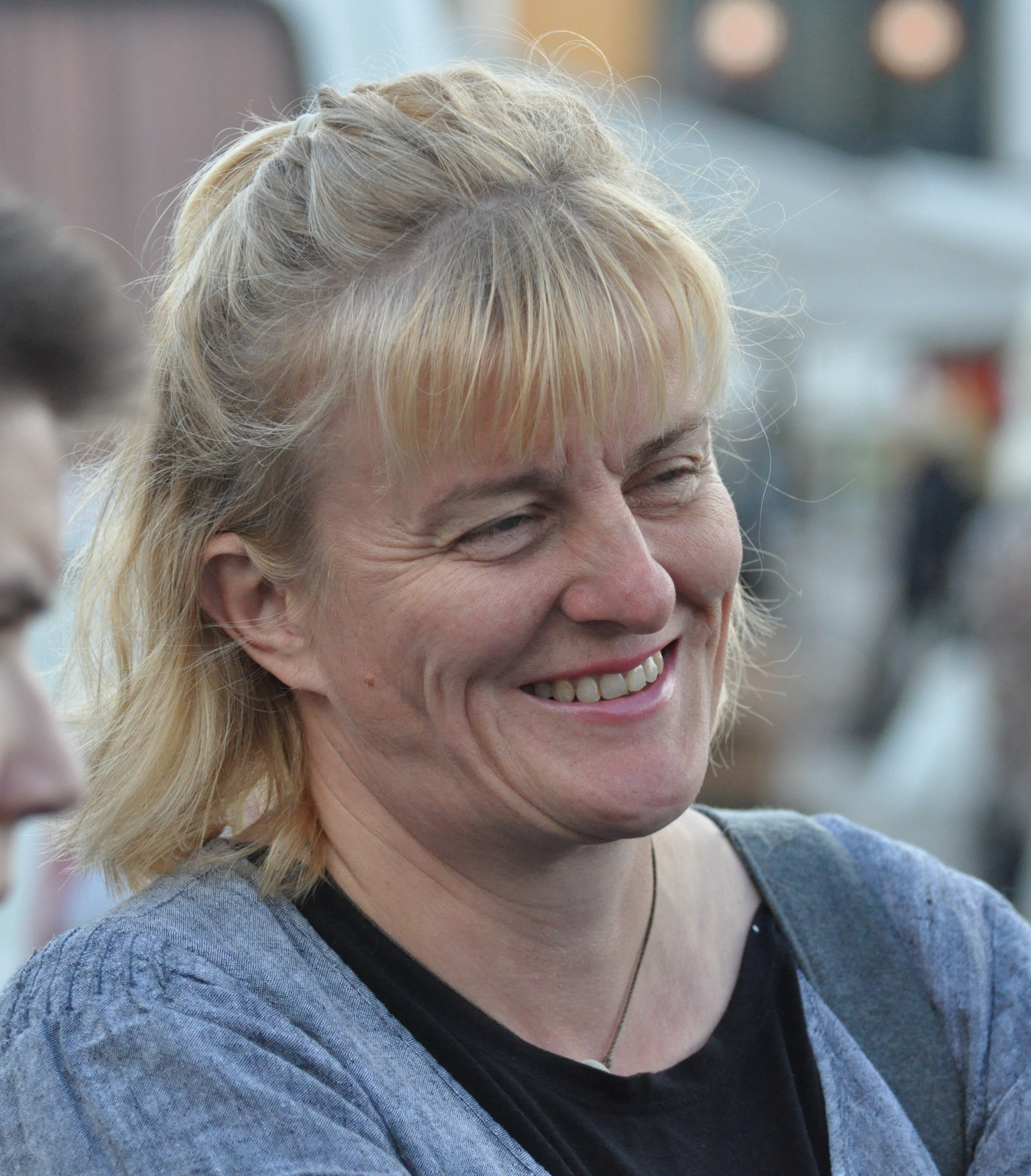
- Pirkko Mattila in August 2011

Minister of Social Affairs and Health
- In office 25 August 2016 – 6 June 2019
- Prime Minister: Juha Sipilä
- Preceded by: Hanna Mäntylä
- Succeeded by: Aino-Kaisa Pekonen

Member of Finnish Parliament for Oulu
- In office 20 April 2011 – 17 April 2019
- Parliamentary group: Blue Reform (2017–2019); Finns Party (2011–2017)

Personal details
- Born: Pirkko Anneli Mattila; 2 April 1964 (age 62) Yli-Ii, Oulu Province, Finland
- Party: Blue Reform (2017–); Finns Party (until 2017)
- Education: University of Oulu (Master of Science)
- Occupation: Nurse, teacher
- Website: http://pirkkomattila.fi/

Pirkko Anneli Mattila is a Finnish politician and a former Member of the Finnish Parliament, representing the Blue Reform party at the end of her tenure. She was first elected MP in the 2011 general election. Mattila replaced Hanna Mäntylä as the Minister of Social Affairs and Health in 2016, following Mäntylä's resignation. As minister, Mattila was notably responsible for examining the implementation of negative income tax in Finland.

On 13 June 2017, Mattila and 19 others resigned from the Finns Party parliamentary group and founded the New Alternative parliamentary group, which later formed the Blue Reform party. Mattila stood in the 2019 parliamentary election as a Blue Reform candidate, but was not elected.

A nurse anesthetist by profession, she obtained her degree in 1988. She graduated as a Master of Science in 2005 from the University of Oulu. She has been active in the Finnish Red Cross and raises goats in Laitasaari, Muhos. She is also a member of the municipal council of Muhos.

In addition to Finnish, she speaks English, Swedish and German.
