= Jussi Halla-aho =

Finnish politician (born 1971)

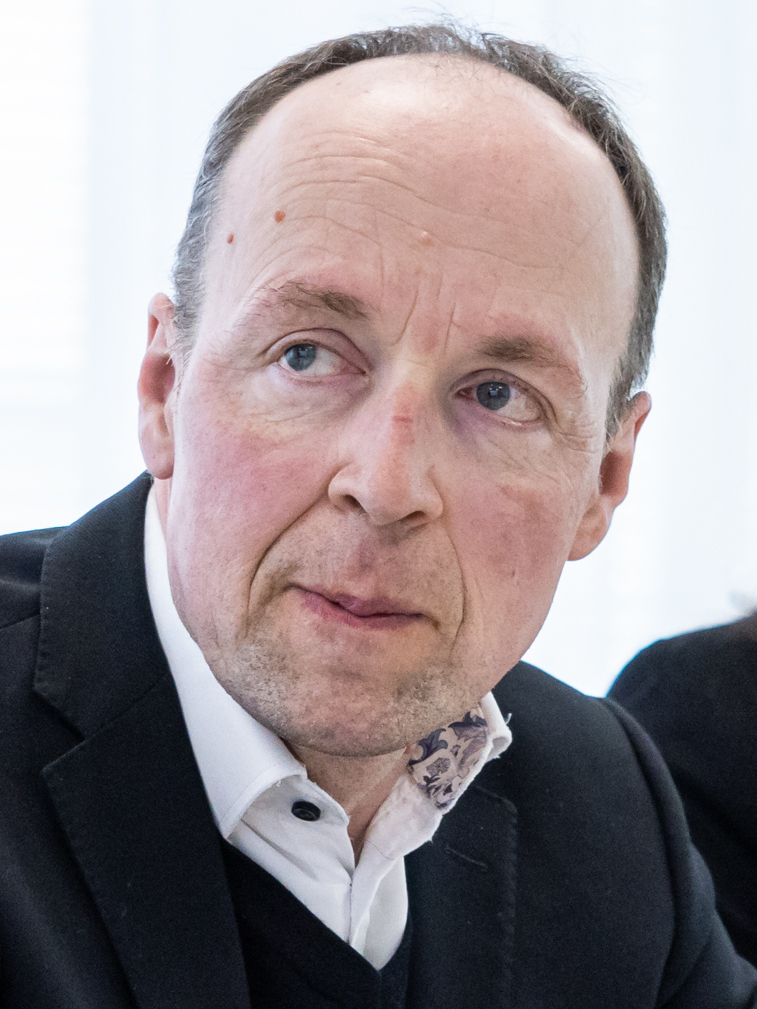
- Halla-aho in 2023

Speaker of the Parliament of Finland
- Incumbent
- Assumed office 21 June 2023
- Preceded by: Petteri Orpo

Leader of the Finns Party
- In office 10 June 2017 – 14 August 2021
- Preceded by: Timo Soini
- Succeeded by: Riikka Purra

Member of Parliament for Helsinki
- Incumbent
- Assumed office 3 July 2019
- In office 19 April 2011 – 30 June 2014
- Succeeded by: Mika Raatikainen

Member of the European Parliament for Finland
- In office 1 July 2014 – 2 July 2019

Personal details
- Born: Jussi Kristian Halla-aho; 27 April 1971 (age 55) Tampere, Finland
- Party: Finns (since 2010)
- Spouse: Hilla Halla-aho (m. 2002)
- Children: 5
- Education: University of Helsinki

Jussi Kristian Halla-aho (Note: Finnish pronunciation: [ˈjusːi ˈhɑlːɑˌɑho]) (born 27 April 1971) is a Finnish politician, currently serving as the Speaker of the Parliament of Finland since 2023. Halla-aho has served as a member of the Parliament of Finland from 2011 to 2014 and again since 2019, and as the leader of the Finns Party from 10 June 2017 to 14 August 2021. Previously, between 2014 and 2019, he was a member of the European Parliament, where he was part of the Identity and Democracy group.

Halla-aho has a PhD in Slavic Studies. Before entering national politics, he was best known for criticising multiculturalism and Finland's immigration policies in his online blog, Scripta. He was first elected to the Helsinki City Council in 2008 and to the Finnish parliament in 2011. In 2014 he was elected to the European Parliament. He was elected leader of the Finns Party in the summer of 2017, defeating Sampo Terho, after which the majority of the party's MPs seceded in protest and formed a new party. In spite of this, Halla-aho led the Finns Party to success in the 2019 election: it recovered all of its lost seats, becoming the second-largest party in parliament (after the Social Democratic Party), and Halla-aho won the largest share of personal votes in the country.

Halla-aho has served as Speaker of Parliament since 21 June 2023. In 2024, he ran for President of Finland.

== Early life ==
Halla-aho grew up in Tampere and lived there 24 years. His mother was from Alajärvi. During the 1980s he travelled to the Soviet Union with his father, who was a bus driver. The trip was the spark for his anti-leftist convictions. When Halla-aho was young, he worked as a waiter. When conscripted, instead of military service he chose civilian service. He later expressed regret at his decision, calling the choice a "stupid political protest", and voicing support for the present conscription system.

== Education ==
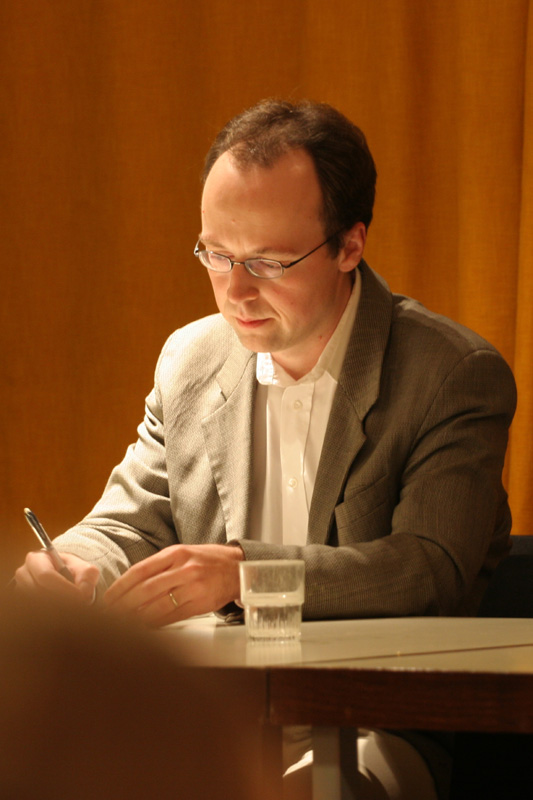
Jussi Halla-aho in 2006

After high school, Halla-aho enrolled in Pirkanmaa Hotel and Restaurant Institute, where he obtained a vocational diploma to become a restaurant waiter. From 1995 to 2000, he was enrolled in the University of Helsinki, studying Russian, Croatian, Polish and Ukrainian, Latin, Greek, Sanskrit, Old Persian, Old Irish and Old English. Awarded a MA in 2000, in 2006 he obtained his Ph.D, with a dissertation on historical nominal morphology of Old Church Slavonic. He has published one article in an academic journal. After graduation, he left academia and worked on a part-time basis supported by short-term academic grants.

== Political career ==
=== Electoral results ===
Halla-aho was elected a member of Helsinki City Council in the 2008 municipal elections as a candidate of the Finns Party (previously known as True Finns), although he was not a member of the party until 2010. In the 2008 elections, he was the 18th most popular candidate in the entire country and the second most popular candidate of the Finns Party after the party leader Timo Soini. Halla-aho won the largest number of personal votes for the party in Helsinki.

Halla-aho was elected to parliament in 2011. His vote share was the sixth highest in the country and the second highest within his party. In the parliament he was made chairman of the Administration Committee, which deals with immigration affairs among other matters. However, in the summer of 2012 Halla-aho resigned from the position of committee chairman, while staying as a member of the committee. Halla-aho was re-elected to the Helsinki City Council in 2012, being the third most popular candidate nationwide.

Halla-aho was elected to the European Parliament in 2014. He was the second most popular candidate in the election with 80,772 votes. He sits in the European Conservatives and Reformists Group (ECR). He is a member of the Committee on Civil Liberties, Justice and Home Affairs, and a substitute member of the Committee on the Internal Market and Consumer Protection.

In 2017, Halla-aho announced he would run for the party chair in the Finns Party leadership election, as the long-time leader of the party Timo Soini decided not to seek another term. During the campaign, Halla-aho and Sampo Terho emerged as the leading candidates, according to opinion polls. Halla-aho emerged victorious in the party conference in Jyväskylä on 10 June, winning a majority of delegates in the first round, and was officially nominated as the Leader of the Finns Party. His selection resulted in a political crisis in Finland, as the leaders of the two other governing coalition parties, Prime Minister Juha Sipilä of Centre and Finance Minister Petteri Orpo of the NCP, stated they would not co-operate with the Finns Party led by Halla-aho. The two leaders argued that their decision was based on value differences between them and Halla-aho's policies, and that the Sipilä Cabinet would duly be dissolved. On 13 June, however, twenty Finns MPs, including former leader Soini, broke away from the parliamentary group and founded New Alternative. Sipilä announced that his cabinet would continue working with New Alternative (later called Blue Reform), thus securing a parliamentary majority, and leaving the remaining Finns MPs in opposition.

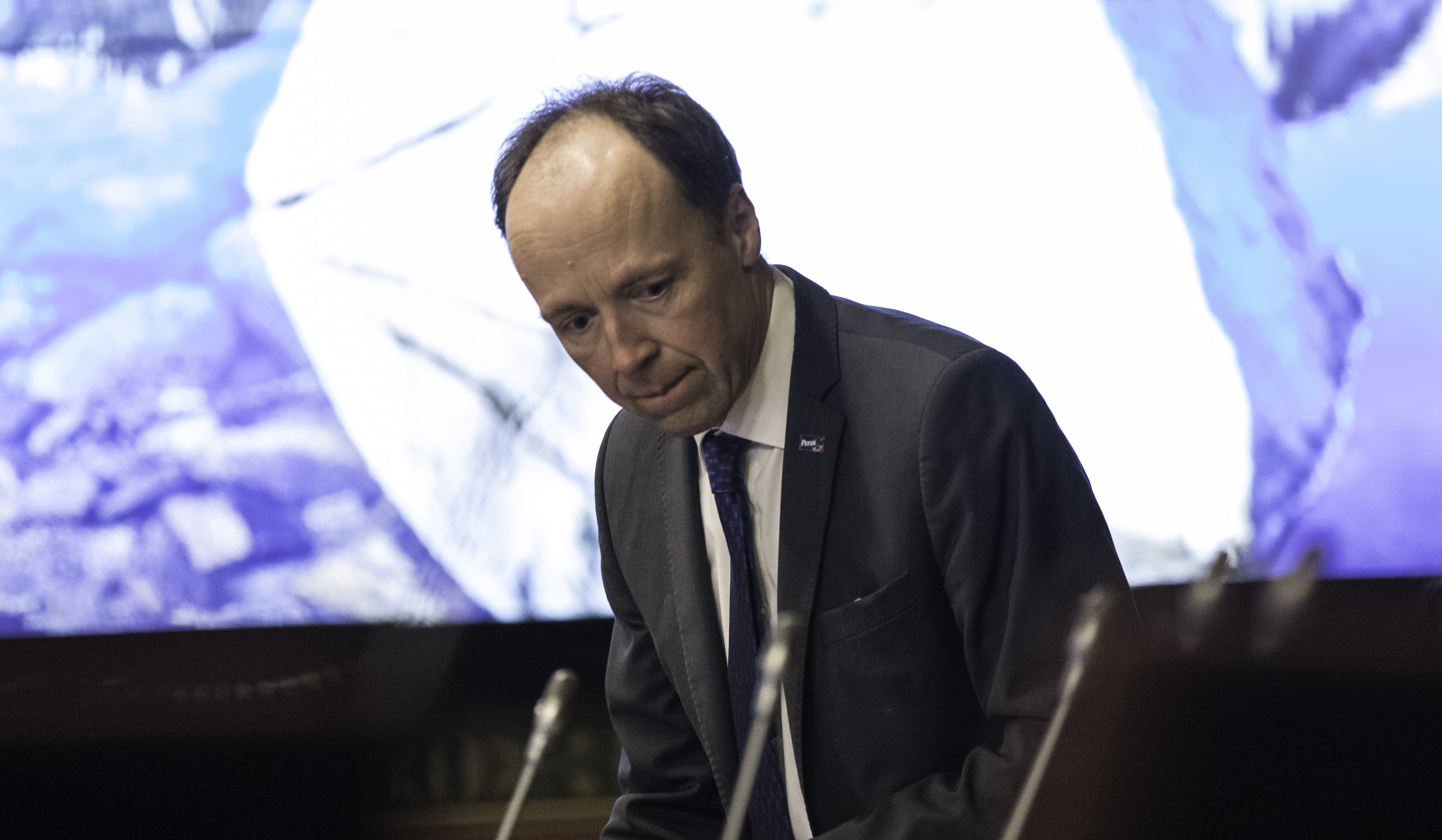
Jussi Halla-aho in 2020

Halla-aho led the remainder of the party into the 2019 parliamentary election, gaining one new seat in comparison to the 2015 elections, while none of the Blue Reform candidates got elected. Halla-aho did personally gain the most votes in the whole country and broke the record for most personal votes in Helsinki constituency.

In June 2021, Halla-aho informed that he is not running for re-election as chairman of party, but will continue in parliament and municipality.

=== Speaker of the Parliament ===
In the 2023 parliamentary election, Halla-aho was re-elected with 22,081 votes. In June 2023, he was elected as the Speaker of the Parliament.

In July 2023, Halla-aho announced his candidacy for the 2024 Finnish presidential election. In the election, he placed third with 18.99% of the total vote count and failed to advance to the second round of voting.

On 25 November 2023 Halla-aho addressed the Verkhovna Rada in Ukrainian on the 90th anniversary of the Holodomor.

On 3 April 2024, he accompanied President of Finland, Alexander Stubb, on a visit to Ukraine, meeting President of Ukraine, Volodymyr Zelenskyy in Kyiv.

==== Parliamentary elections ====
Year	Constituency	Votes	Percentage	Result
2007	Helsinki	2,215	0.70%	Not elected
2011	Helsinki	15,074	4.33%	Elected
2019	Helsinki	30,596	7.87%	Elected
2023	Helsinki	22,081	5.78%	Elected

==== Municipal elections ====
Year	Municipality	Votes	Percentage	Result
2008	Helsinki	2,977	1.07%	Elected
2012	Helsinki	6,034	2.11%	Elected
2017	Helsinki	5,668	1.74%	Elected
2021	Helsinki	18,978	5.67%	Elected

==== European Parliament elections ====
Year	Constituency	Votes	Percentage	Result
2014	Finland	80,772	4.67%	Elected

=== Political interests ===
Halla-aho has stated that he became politically active because he finds the Finnish immigration policy a problem and believes that Europe is heading towards a catastrophe because of massive immigration. Halla-aho voices support for the welfare state, and places himself on the left side of the political spectrum, in matters of economic policy. Still, he maintains that, all sides taken into account, if forced to choose between left-wing and right-wing politics he would choose the right-wing.

Halla-aho maintains a blog titled Scripta which states that it treats issues such as "immigration, multiculturalism, tolerance, racism, freedom of speech and political correctness". His blog had between 3,000 and 6,000 readers a day in 2008, which made him the best known political blogger in Finland according to the newspaper Aamulehti.

In a 2007 interview with Helsingin Sanomat Halla-aho explained his opposition to multiculturalism in the following way:

In Finland the starting point [of the conversation] is that multiculturalism is a richness in itself. This is an untenable claim. When rival value systems and codes of conduct are accepted in a society, it leads automatically to conflicts. Finland is no exception. It is mainly the attributes of the Muslim cultures, that make the integration of these groups into Finland impossible, as long as they hold on to their special characteristics and as long as the society encourages them to wrap themselves in this otherness. It creates a spiral of social exclusion and ethnic ghettoisation.

Halla-aho has demanded that positive discrimination and what he calls privileges due to culture or nationality should not be allowed. Referring to his own works, he has affirmed that criticising "totalitarian fascist ideologies like political Islam" should not be considered racism and that facts cannot be criminalised. According to Halla-aho, immigration is a taboo in Finland. He has disclosed that he has received death threats because of his web columns.

Halla-aho has been accused of racism by academics and members of the Finnish government, and has been connected to the counter-jihad movement, having previously been a contributor to the blog Gates of Vienna. He denies xenophobia allegations against him and maintains that he is simply “critical of immigration”, and that he has supporters among immigrants, as well.

On 19 April 2022, in the aftermath of Russian invasion of Ukraine when German Bundestag member Tino Chrupalla from right-wing populist AfD praised Chancellor Olaf Scholz's decision not to send heavy weapons to Ukraine and demanded an end to sanctions against Russia and for peace negotiations to start, Halla-aho responded on X (formerly Twitter) in German "I find it impossible to understand how a nationalist party can support or justify imperialism." (Ich finde es unmöglich zu verstehen, wie eine nazionalistische Partei Imperialismus unterstützen oder rechtfertigen kann.)

== Criminal charges and conviction ==
In December 2008, Halla-aho was put under investigation for incitement to ethnic or racial hatred (under Finnish law referred to as "ethnic agitation") for remarks published on his blog.

On 27 March 2009, the Helsinki District Court ordered Halla-aho to stand for trial on charges of ethnic agitation and breach of the sanctity of religion. The charges were raised on the basis of remarks related to the sentencing of Seppo Lehto on Halla-aho's blog in 2008. Here, he wrote that Muhammad was a pedophile, making reference to Muhammad's marriage with Aisha, who Muhammad married when Aisha was 6 or 7 and claimed that Islam is a religion that sanctifies pedophilia. The text discussed the limits of free speech and intentionally made some controversial claims in order to test the response of judiciary. In another text, he asked if it could be stated that robbing passersby and living on taxpayers' expense are cultural and possibly genetic characteristics of Somalis. The text was originally a response to a Finnish columnist of the newspaper Kaleva, who had written that drinking excessively and killing when drunk were cultural and possibly genetic characteristics of Finns and was intended to underline the hypocrisy of it being possible to be prosecuted for one of those essentially similar statements but not for the other.

On 8 September 2009, the District Court convicted Halla-aho of disturbing religious worship, and ordered him to pay a fine of 330 euros. The charge of ethnic agitation was dismissed. In October 2010 the Court of Appeal agreed with the District Court's conviction. Both the prosecutor and Halla-aho appealed the case to the Supreme Court. The Supreme Court granted a leave to appeal in May 2011. In a sentence given on the 8 of June 2012, the Supreme Court found Halla-aho guilty of both disturbing religious worship and of ethnic agitation and increased his fines accordingly to 400 euros.

In 2019 Halla-aho said he still stands by his past writings.

== Other controversies ==
In December 2006 Halla-aho wrote in his blog Scripta on immigration that, “Since rapes will increase in any case, the appropriate people should be raped: in other words, green-leftist do-gooders and their supporters", naming some of the politicians which led to a police investigation.

In September 2011 Halla-aho wrote in Facebook that Greece's debt problems cannot be resolved without a military junta. He soon retracted the comment, clarifying that his intention was merely to point out that making necessary but unpopular decisions is not easy in a democracy. Timo Soini, the leader of the party, demanded a temporary suspension of Halla-aho from the parliamentary group. In the end the parliamentary group unanimously (Halla-aho himself included) suspended Halla-aho for two weeks, although Soini had initially called for a month-long suspension.

== Personal life ==
Halla-aho lives in Eira in Helsinki with his wife Hilla Halla-aho and their four children. In May 2017, it was revealed that he had also had one child with another woman in 2015. Information was leaked to the press by the anonymous mother, who was disappointed that Halla-aho had always mentioned publicly that he only had four children. Halla-aho confirmed the information when asked, but declined further comment.

Halla-aho's hobbies include reading astronomy as well as pistol and rifle shooting. He used to be a member of Suomen Sisu, an association that seeks to promote Finnish ethnic nationalism. He quit the association in June 2019, but did not specify why, though stating that he sees Finnish people as an ethnic folk. He is not a member in any church and considers himself a moderate agnostic atheist.

Halla-aho is occasionally referred as Mestari (Master) as a nickname among his supporters.

== Publications ==
=== Academic works ===
- Halla-aho, Jussi: Problems of Proto-Slavic historical nominal morphology: On the basis of Old Church Slavic. Slavica Helsingiensia 26, Helsinki, University of Helsinki, Department of Slavonic Languages, 2006. ISBN 952-10-3012-7 (in English)
- Halla-aho, Jussi: Two borrowings in Proto-Slavic; and a minor Balto-Slavic sound change, Journal of Indo-European Studies 33, p. 233-245, 2005. (in English)
- Halla-aho, Jussi: “The collapse of an early Proto-Indo-European ablaut pattern.” Indogermanische Forschungen 110, p. 97-118, 2005. (in English)
- Nuorluoto, Juhani & Leiwo, Martti & Halla-aho, Jussi (editors): Papers in Slavic, Baltic and Balkan studies, Slavica Helsingiensia 21, Helsinki, University of Helsinki, Department of Slavonic and Baltic Languages and Literatures, 2001 ISBN 952-10-0246-8 (Selection of papers by Slavists, Baltologists and Balkanists from Austria/Croatia, Canada, Finland, Latvia, Poland, Russia and the United States of America) (in English)
- Halla-aho, Jussi: Old Church Slavic Manual. Helsinki, Jussi Halla-aho, 2006 (in English and Finnish)

=== Political works ===
- Halla-aho, Jussi: Kirjoituksia uppoavasta Lännestä, Jussi Halla-aho, 2009 ISBN 978-952-92-5213-8

In 2009, Halla-aho published a collection of his web columns titled Kirjoituksia uppoavasta Lännestä (Writings from the sinking West or Writings about the sinking West) in print. The book's first edition sold out in three days.

== Notes ==
Party political offices
Preceded by Timo Soini	Leader of the Finns Party; 2017–2021	Succeeded by Riikka Purra
Political offices
Preceded by Petteri Orpo	Speaker of the Parliament of Finland; 2023–present	Incumbent
