= Blue Reform =

Blue Reform Korjausliike
- Abbreviation: Korj
- Chairperson: Petri Roininen
- Founders: Sampo Terho; Timo Soini
- Founded: 13 June 2017
- Dissolved: 11 June 2023
- Split from: Finns Party
- Headquarters: Helsinki
- Youth wing: Siniset Nuoret
- Women's wing: Siniset Naiset
- Membership (2018): c. 700
- Ideology: Economic liberalism National conservatism
- Political position: Right-wing
- European affiliation: European Conservatives and Reformists Party (until 2022)
- Colors: Orange

Website
- www.korjausliike.fi

The Finnish Reform Movement (Finnish: Korjausliike, Korj), previously known as Blue Reform (Finnish: Sininen tulevaisuus/Siniset), was a Finnish conservative political party.

It was founded by the 19 MPs who left the Finns Party on 13 June 2017 in protest against Jussi Halla-aho having been elected party leader. The new parliamentary group of these defectors was initially called New Alternative (Finnish: Uusi vaihtoehto, UV; Swedish: Nytt alternativ, NA). A new name for the party was announced on 19 June. The association of this name was officially registered on 3 July 2017.

The party was chaired by Sampo Terho, the Minister for European Affairs, Culture and Sport, until June 2019. It also included all the other cabinet ministers who were previously members of the Finns Party: Timo Soini, Jussi Niinistö, Jari Lindström and Pirkko Mattila. It was one of the three parties that made up the Sipilä Cabinet until its resignation on 8 March 2019.

It lost all seats in the 2019 election. In April 2022, it changed its name to the Finnish Reform Movement. The party was de-registered in 2023 after failing to win seats in two consecutive parliamentary elections, and dissolved itself two months later.

== History ==
=== Finns Party ===
The Blue Reform originates from the Finns Party, founded by Timo Soini, Raimo Vistbacka, Urpo Leppänen and Kari Bärlund in 1995. It took some time before the Finns Party gained ground in Finnish elections and the party's sole MP until 2003 was Vistbacka. In 2003, the party won three seats: besides Vistbacka, Soini and Tony Halme were elected. Soini had taken over as the chairperson in 1997 and remained in the position for twenty years until 2017. The party slowly gained ground, but ultimately saw exceptional rise in 2011 election, when the party gained 39 seats, making them the third largest party in the parliament and the leading opposition party. In the 2015 election, the Finns Party became the second biggest party in the parliament with 38 seats. The Finns Party subsequently entered into a coalition government with the Centre Party and the National Coalition Party, led by Prime Minister Juha Sipilä.

In March 2017, Soini announced that he would step down as party chair in the next party congress. In June 2017, Jussi Halla-aho and Sampo Terho faced off in the leadership election, in which Halla-aho received 949 votes against Terho's 646 votes and thus succeeded Soini as party chair. Sipilä and Finance Minister Petteri Orpo soon announced that they would not continue their coalition with the Finns Party if it was led by Halla-aho.

On 13 June 2017, 20 members of the Finns Party, including Soini and Terho, left its parliamentary group to form the New Alternative (Finnish: Uusi vaihtoehto (uv), Swedish: Nytt alternativ (na)) parliamentary group. The decision followed the election of Halla-aho, who had received criticism both inside and outside of the Finns Party for his strict views on immigration and Islam. MP Simon Elo was chosen to lead the group for the time being. While Halla-aho's Finns Party was expelled from the Finnish government, the New Alternative continued as a member of the government coalition.

=== Formation ===
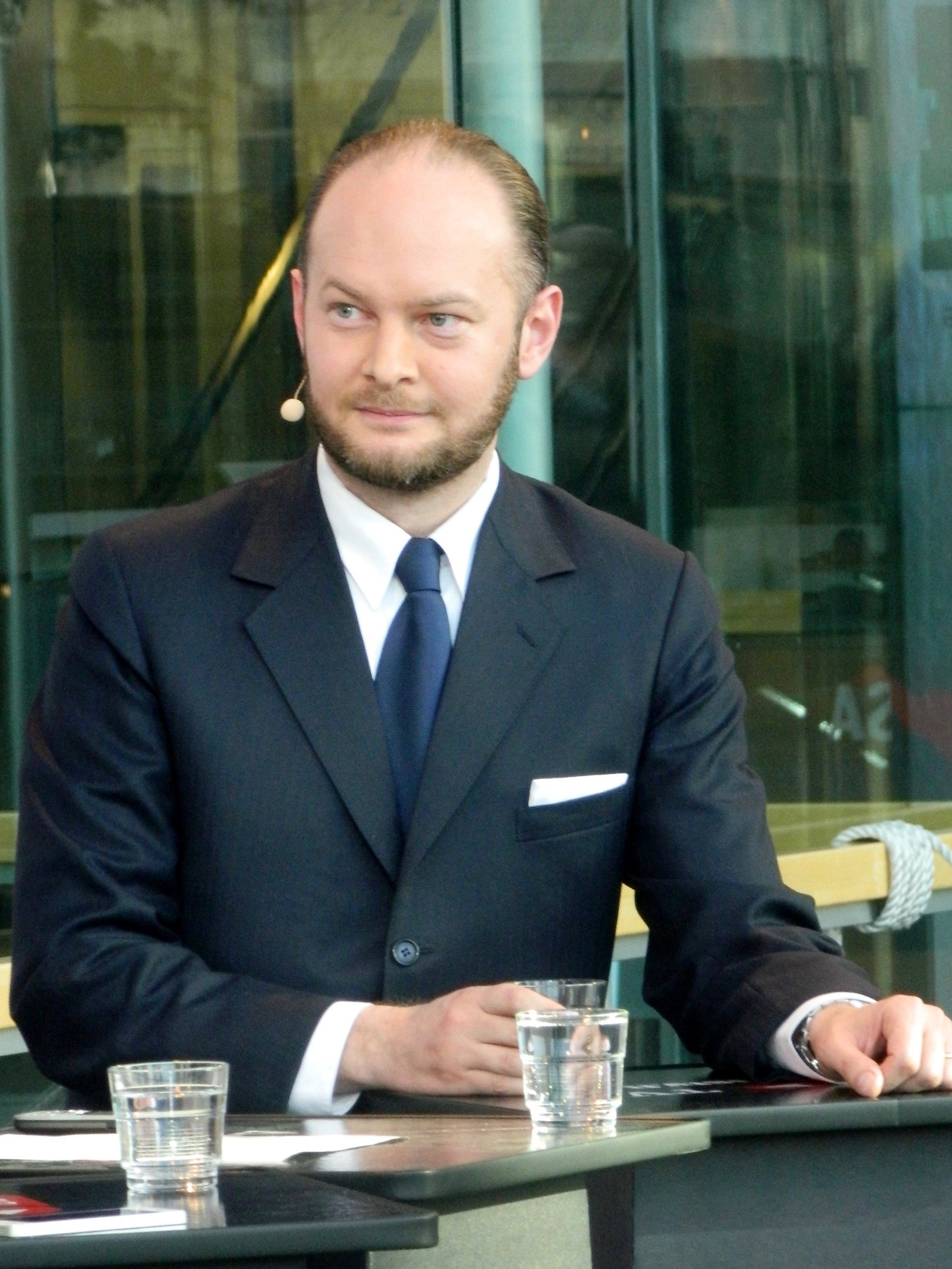
The first chairperson of the party, Sampo Terho.

On 19 June 2017, Sampo Terho announced that a new party would be formed based on the New Alternative parliamentary group under the name Blue Reform. The parliamentary group still saw some changes, as on 22 June 2017, Ritva Elomaa left the group to re-join the Finns Party, after which the group had 19 members left. On 30 June 2017, Hanna Mäntylä left the Parliament to work for the Council of Europe and she was replaced by the substitute MP Matti Torvinen (the highest-placed non-elected True Finns candidate). Torvinen subsequently left the Finns Party and joined the New Alternative.

On 15 November 2017, the Blue Reform was officially registered as a political party. The first party convention, organized on 16 December 2017, elected Terho as the first chairperson of the party and MP Matti Torvinen as the party secretary.

The popularity of the party lagged behind for the rest of its term in Sipilä cabinet. For example, according to a Helsingin Sanomat opinion poll conducted in May 2018, Blue Reform had a popular support of 1.7 percent, making it the least popular group represented in the Parliament of Finland. The party also saw two defections, as MP Kaj Turunen defected to the National Coalition Party in April 2018 and MP Maria Lohela to Movement Now in January 2019.

On 8 March 2019, Juha Sipilä asked permission from President of Finland Sauli Niinistö to dissolve the cabinet, because of the failure to reach agreement on the controversial health care reform. The cabinet was dissolved that day but was requested to continue on a caretaker basis until a new government was formed.

=== Fall from the Parliament ===
Party logo until 2022.

Blue Reform took part in the parliamentary election on 14 April 2019, but failed to get a single seat. Terho ensured after the election that the party would continue its operations, as it still had multiple representatives in local councils.

On 3 May 2019, Terho announced he would step down as the Chair of the Blue Reform in June 2019. On 8 June 2019, Kari Kulmala was elected the new chair.

In September 2021, Petri Roininen, the corporate director of Investors House, was elected the new chairperson of the party.

== Politics ==
Blue Reform said that it wanted a society that encourages people to work, to found businesses and to care about others and ensures a living for every citizen. The party also respected family values and said that "the only interest group it works for is the people of Finland". In addition, Blue Reform said that it respected human rights and denounced all hatred towards human beings.

== Election results ==
=== Parliament of Finland ===
| Election | Votes | % | Seats | +/– | Government |
|---|---|---|---|---|---|
| 2019 | 29,943 | 0.97 | 0 / 200 | New | Extra-parliamentary |
| 2023 | 1,362 | 0.04 | 0 / 200 | 0 | Extra-parliamentary |

=== European elections ===
| Year | Elected | Votes | Share |
|---|---|---|---|
| 2019 | 0 | 6,043 | 0.3% |

=== Municipal elections ===
| Year | Elected | Votes | Share |
|---|---|---|---|
| 2021 | 4 | 1,197 | 0.05% |

== Elected representatives ==
=== Former Members of Parliament ===
- Simon Elo (2017–2019; Finns Party MP 2015–2017)
- Tiina Elovaara (2017–2019; Finns Party MP 2015–2017)
- Reijo Hongisto (2017–2019; Finns Party MP 2011–2017)
- Ari Jalonen (2017–2019; Finns Party MP 2011–2017)
- Kimmo Kivelä (2017–2019; Finns Party MP 2011–2017)
- Kari Kulmala (2017–2019; Finns Party MP 2015–2017)
- Jari Lindström (2017–2019; Finns Party MP 2011–2017)
- Anne Louhelainen (2017–2019; Finns Party MP 2011–2017)
- Pirkko Mattila (2017–2019; Finns Party MP 2011–2017)
- Lea Mäkipää (2017–2019; Rural Party MP 1983–1995, Finns Party MP 2011–2017)
- Martti Mölsä (2017–2019; Finns Party MP 2011–2017)
- Jussi Niinistö (2017–2019; Finns Party MP 2011–2017)
- Pentti Oinonen (2017–2019; Finns Party MP 2007–2017)
- Vesa-Matti Saarakkala (2017–2019; Finns Party MP 2011–2017)
- Timo Soini (2017–2019; Finns Party MP 2003–2009, 2011–2017)
- Sampo Terho (2017–2019; Finns Party MP 2015–2017)
- Matti Torvinen (2017–2019)
- Kike Elomaa (2017; Finns Party MP 2011–2017; defected back to the Finns Party in 2017)
- Maria Lohela (2017–2019; Finns Party MP 2011–2017; defected to Liike Nyt in 2019)
- Hanna Mäntylä (2017; Finns Party MP 2011–2017; left to work for the Council of Europe)
- Kaj Turunen (2017–2018; Finns Party MP 2011–2017; defected to the National Coalition Party in 2018)

== See also ==
- 2017 Finnish government crisis
- Finnish People's Unity Party
- Politics of Finland
