= Timo Soini =

Finnish politician (born 1962)

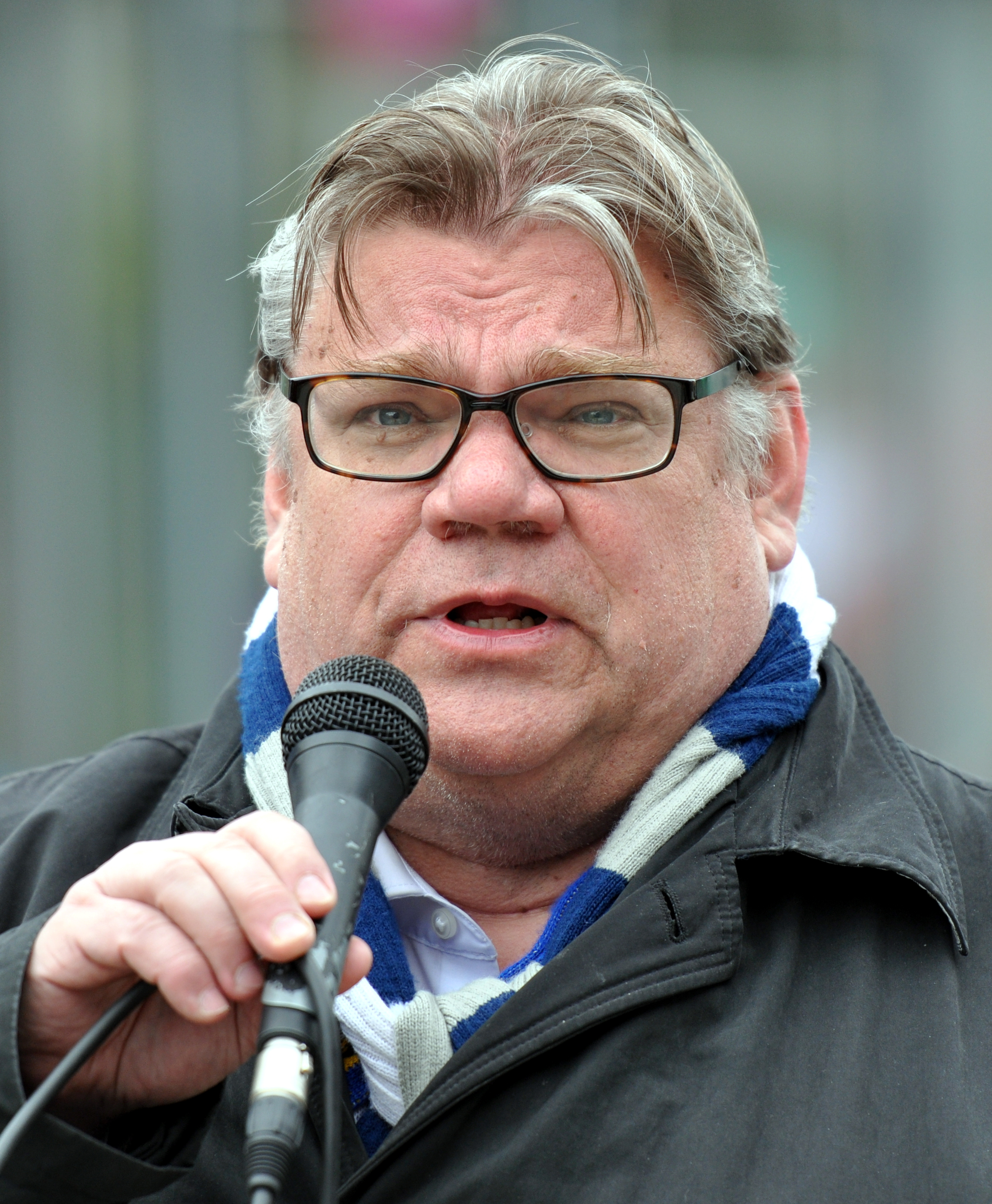
- Soini in 2015

Minister for Foreign Affairs
- In office 29 May 2015 – 6 June 2019
- Prime Minister: Juha Sipilä
- Preceded by: Erkki Tuomioja
- Succeeded by: Pekka Haavisto

31st Deputy Prime Minister of Finland
- In office 29 May 2015 – 28 June 2017
- Prime Minister: Juha Sipilä
- Preceded by: Antti Rinne
- Succeeded by: Petteri Orpo

President of the Committee of Ministers of the Council of Europe
- In office 21 November 2018 – 17 May 2019
- Preceded by: Marija Pejčinović Burić
- Succeeded by: Jean-Yves Le Drian

Leader of the Finns Party
- In office 1997–2017
- Preceded by: Raimo Vistbacka
- Succeeded by: Jussi Halla-aho

Personal details
- Born: Timo Juhani Soini; 30 May 1962 (age 64) Rauma, Finland
- Party: Independent
- Other political affiliations: Finnish Reform Movement (2017–2023); Finns Party (1995–2017); Finnish Rural Party (1979–1995)
- Education: University of Helsinki
- Website: Official website

Military service
- Allegiance: Finland
- Branch/service: Finnish Army
- Rank: Corporal

Timo Juhani Soini (born 30 May 1962) is a Finnish politician who is the co-founder and former leader of the Finns Party. He served as Deputy Prime Minister of Finland from 2015 to 2017 and Minister of Foreign Affairs from 2015 to 2019.

He was elected as a member of the Espoo city council in 2000, and the Parliament of Finland in 2003. In the 2009 European Parliament election, he won a seat in the European Parliament with Finland's highest personal vote share (nearly 10% of all votes), becoming the first member of the Finns Party in the European Parliament. He was a member of the European Parliament from 2009 until 2011, when he returned to the Finnish Parliament.

In the 2011 parliamentary election, his party won 19.1% of the votes, which was described as "shocking" and "exceptional" by the Finnish media. Soini himself won the most votes of all candidates, leaving behind the Finnish Foreign Minister Alexander Stubb and the Minister of Finance Jyrki Katainen in their Uusimaa electoral district. Helsingin Sanomat concluded that "Timo Soini rewrote the electoral history books".

Soini has become one of the internationally best-known critics of European Union bailouts and safety mechanisms. Following the 2015 parliamentary election, his party joined a coalition government and Soini became Deputy Prime Minister and Minister of Foreign Affairs in May 2015. In March 2017, Soini announced that he would step down as Chair of the Finns Party in June 2017, causing a hotly contested leadership election. After the selection of Jussi Halla-aho as new party chairman – prompting a break between Prime Minister Juha Sipilä and the Finns Party – Soini declared his intention to form a new parliamentary group and remain in the government, causing a split in the party. Soini was subsequently expelled from the party along with the other defector MPs.

Soini did not take part in the 2019 parliamentary election and announced soon after the election that he was leaving politics behind.

== Early life and education ==
Timo Soini worked for the food company Linkosuo Oy for two summers in 1981 and 1982 and was Secretary-General and Chairman of the Kehittyvän Suomen Nuorten Liitto (Youth League of Developing Finland) from 1983 to 1992. He graduated with a Master of Political Science from the University of Helsinki in 1988, majoring in political theory. He wrote his master's thesis on populism and the Finnish Rural Party.

His military rank is Corporal.

== Personal life ==
He is a devout Catholic, which he became as a result of his experiences on his many trips to Ireland. (In Finland, the Catholic Church is a small minority church having merely 11,000 members.) He was also influenced by the pope's anti-communism and anti-atheism.

Soini has also publicly announced that he is a cordial friend of the state of Israel. According to the BBC, Soini is "a die-hard supporter" of English football club Millwall FC.

As of 2011, Soini lived in the Kaitaa district of Espoo, in the Greater Helsinki area, residing in the same apartment block since 1968. He is married and has two children.

== Political career ==
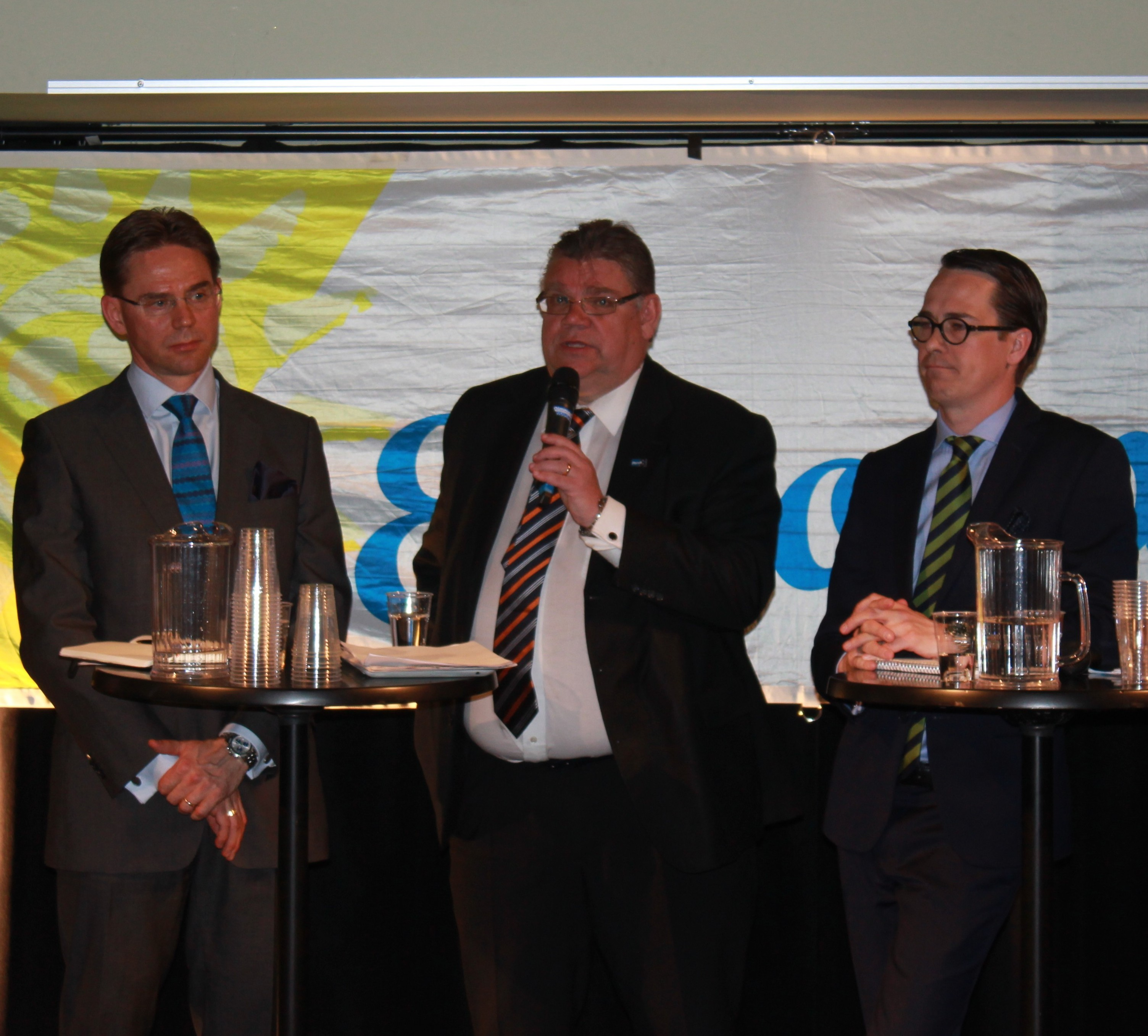
Soini in a debate with NCP leader and Prime Minister Jyrki Katainen (left) and SPP leader Carl Haglund (right) in 2014.

Soini was a member of the Finnish Rural Party, and was its secretary-general from 1992. After the Rural Party dissolved following the March 1995 elections, Soini and two others filed paperwork, in mid-May 1995, to create a new political party, initially to be called the Pure Finnish Association. It was, instead, founded as the True Finns Party (later the Finns Party) and two years later Soini succeeded Raimo Vistbacka as chairman, a position he has held ever since. He ran for a seat in parliament in the spring 1999 elections but lost. He was first elected to the parliament in 2003. Soini was his party's candidate in the 2006 Presidential election, finishing fifth out of the eight candidates in the first round, with a vote share of 3.4%. In March 2008, Soini wrote an autobiographical book called Maisterisjätkä, published by Tammi.

In 2011 he visited the party conference of UKIP, the British political party with which he has had a long friendship. He was also invited to speak at the UK Conservative Party Conference in 2011 and again spoke at the UKIP National Conference 2013 in London on 20 September.

=== 2011 parliamentary election ===
The Finns Party obtained 39 seats in the 2011 election, making them the third-largest party. Soini received 43 437 personal votes (1.5% of all votes), the highest amount of all of the candidates. Soini managed to raise the popularity of the party from 4.1% to 19.1% in four years. Helsingin Sanomat opined in an editorial that Soini "rewrote the electoral history books". According to the BBC, behind Soini's success was "brain, wit and charisma". A university professor and a political analyst, Mr. Jan Sundberg, pointed to Soini's oratorical skills and ability to appeal to common people and make complicated things look easy. The election result was also referred to as "shocking" and "exceptional". During the government negotiations following the election the Finns Party decided against participating in Katainen's coalition cabinet, citing greatly differing stances on the EU, especially regarding bailouts for debt-ridden euro countries.

=== 2015 parliamentary election ===
The Finns Party obtained 38 seats in the 2015 election, becoming second biggest party after Center Party. Coalition negotiations began on 8 May between Center Party, Finns Party and National Coalition Party. Soini joined the government as Deputy Prime Minister and Minister for Foreign Affairs.

=== Positions held ===
His curriculum vitae on the European Parliament webpage and the Finnish Parliament webpage list the following:

- Pre-university school-leaving certificate (1981)
- Master of Political Science (1988)
- Youth League of Developing Finland, special correspondent of Suomen Uutiset (1983–89)
- Vice-chair, Finnish Rural Party (1989–92)
- Party Secretary, Finnish Rural Party (1992–95)
- Chair, The Finns Party (1997–present)
- Member of the Finnish Parliament (2003–2009, 2011–2019)
- Member of the European Parliament (2009–2011)
- Member of Espoo City Council (since 2001)
- Member of Espoo City Board (2007–08)
- Member, Legal Affairs Committee of the Finnish Parliament (2003–07); substitute member, Grand Committee of the Finnish Parliament (2003–07); member, Grand Committee of the Finnish Parliament (2007–09); substitute member, Legal Affairs Committee of the Finnish Parliament (2007–09)
- Chair, Foreign Affairs Committee of the Finnish Parliament (2011–2015); substitute member, Grand Committee of the Finnish Parliament (2011–2015)
- Deputy Prime Minister (2015–2017)
- Minister for Foreign Affairs (2015–2019)

== Relationship with the United States ==
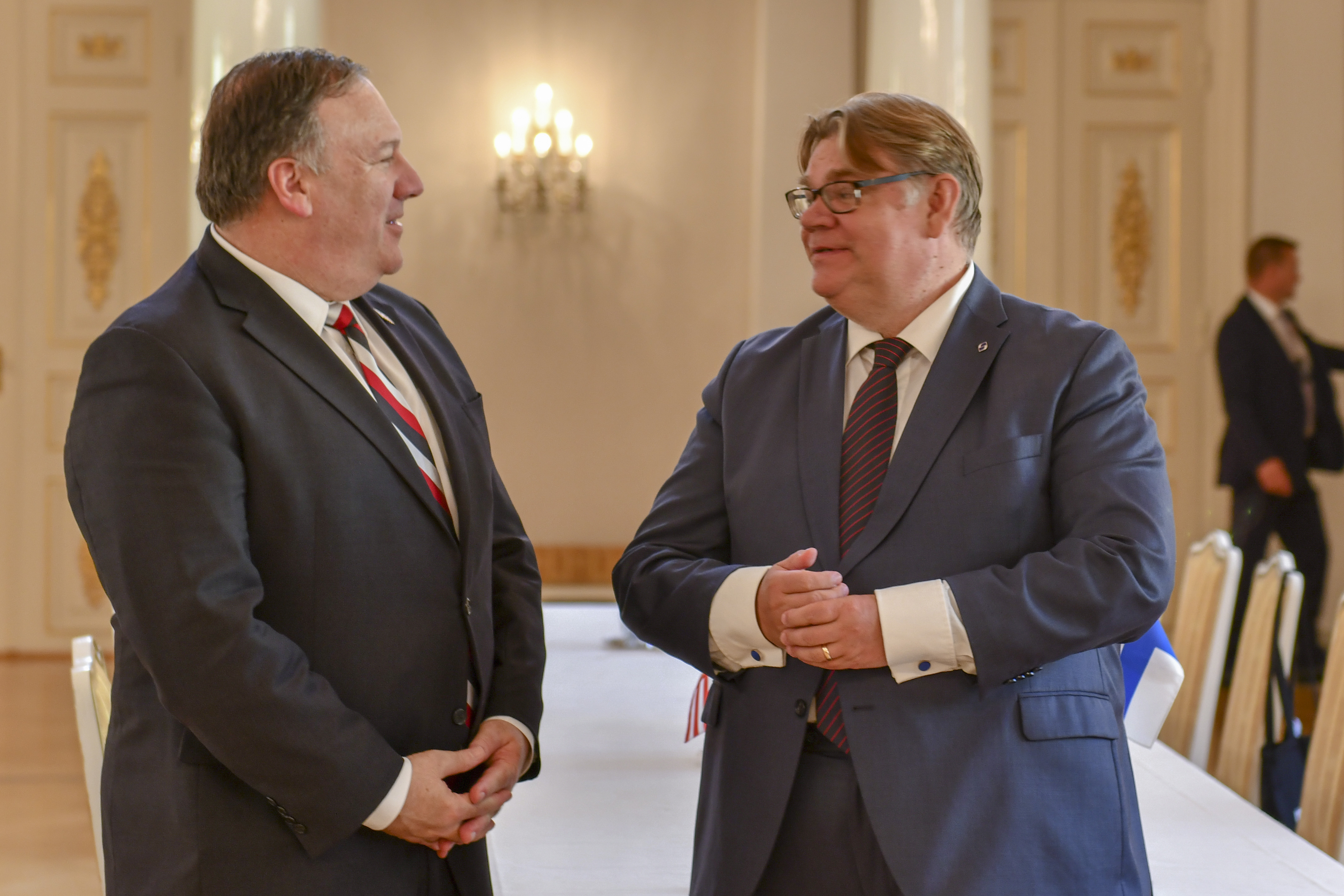
Soini with US Secretary of State Mike Pompeo

He has frequently visited the United States and received invitations to several establishment meetings, such as National Prayer Breakfast hosted by President Barack Obama. He has also commented on European affairs in the American conservative media, for example on Fox News. In Finland Soini has also been seen hosting senior American politicians, such as the conservative former presidential candidate Michele Bachmann in April 2014.

== Views ==
=== Climate change ===
In January 2011, Soini called for Finland to quit all international climate change agreements. According to him, emission trading is a major financial crime in Europe. The European Union Emission Trading Scheme was introduced in 2005. Soini wanted to cancel all recent additions to the energy and environmental taxes. He used the expression: "Green taxes are like shooting yourself in the foot". Soini was criticised for acting as a brake on climate change solutions by MP Oras Tynkkynen, a Green focusing on climate policy, and for calling Finland the North Korea of climate policy by MP Miapetra Kumpula-Natri, a Social Democrat.

According to Soini, he worked on the party's climate policy program for one and a half years. The published program was copied almost word by word from a year old document of the Metal Union written by Matti Putkonen, a former Metal Union employee now working for the Finns Party.

=== Religion ===
Soini is a practising Catholic. His views on religious and moral issues include opposition to abortion, homosexuality and the ordination of women as priests. Soini converted to Roman Catholicism from Lutheranism in 1988. Catholicism is a religious minority in Finland, with only about 0.3% of residents identifying as Catholic.

=== Abortion ===
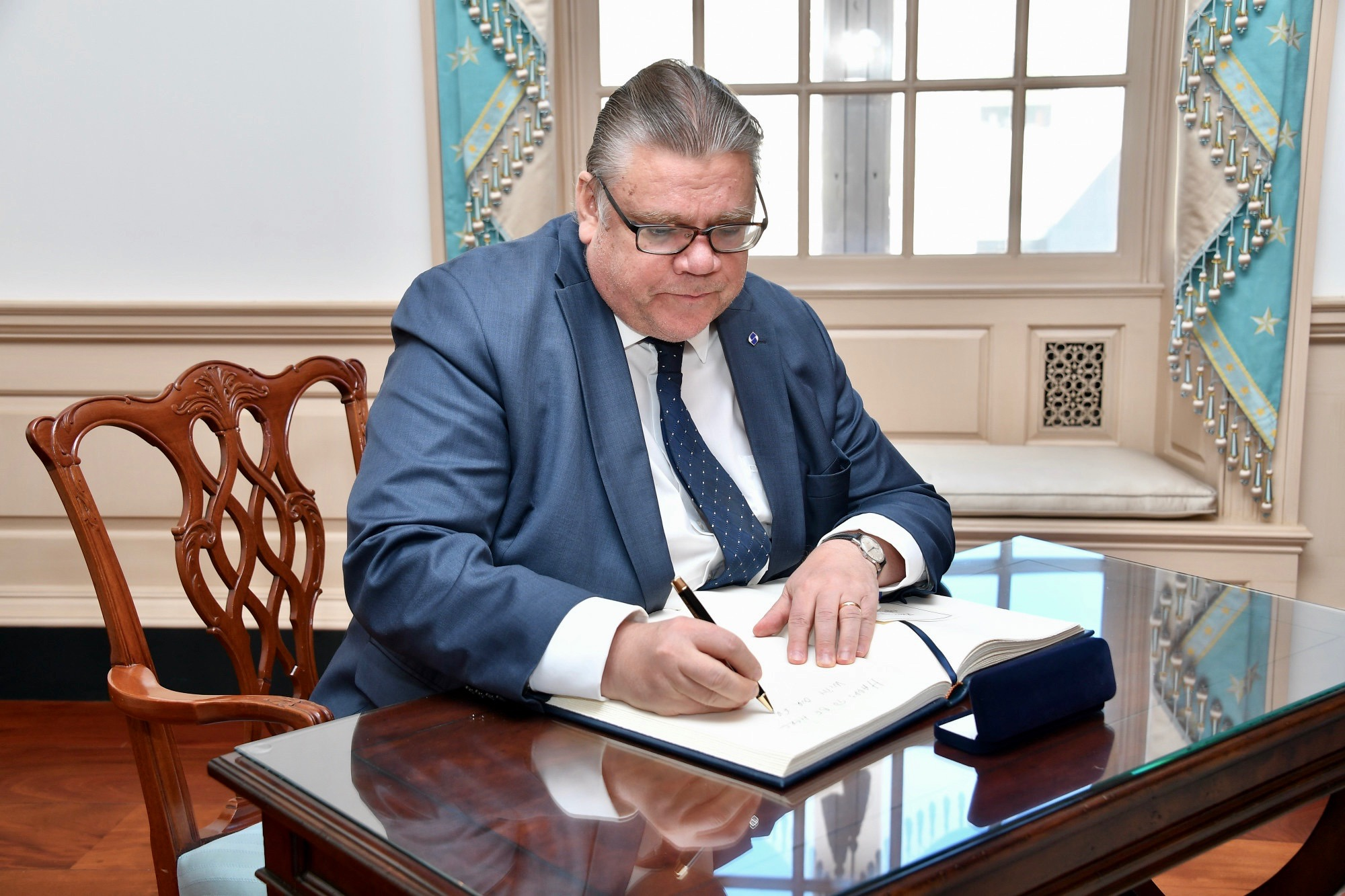
Timo Soini in 2018

In May 2018, Soini, as a Catholic, criticized the Irish abortion referendum, despite the Sipilä Cabinet and the official position of the Finnish government to support abortion rights.

== See also ==
- List of foreign ministers in 2017
- List of current foreign ministers

Party political offices
Preceded by Raimo Vistbacka	Leader of the Finns Party; 1997–2017	Succeeded by Jussi Halla-aho
Political offices
Preceded by Antti Rinne	Deputy Prime Minister of Finland; 2015–2017	Succeeded by Petteri Orpo
Preceded by Erkki Tuomioja	Minister for Foreign Affairs; 2015–2019	Succeeded by Pekka Haavisto
