= Juha Sipilä =

Prime Minister of Finland from 2015 to 2019

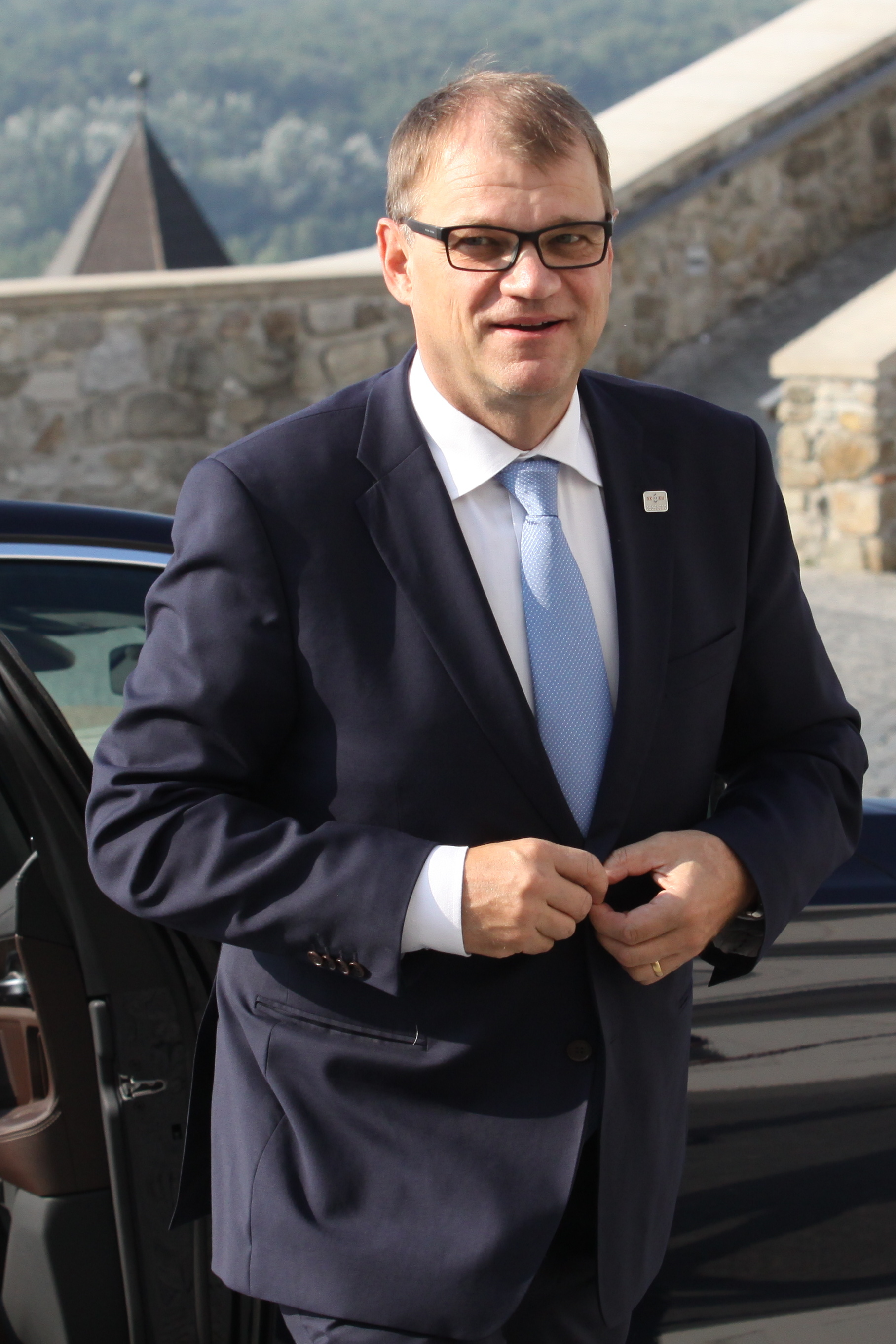
- Sipilä in 2016

44th Prime Minister of Finland
- In office 29 May 2015 – 6 June 2019
- President: Sauli Niinistö
- Deputy: Timo Soini; Petteri Orpo
- Preceded by: Alexander Stubb
- Succeeded by: Antti Rinne

Speaker of the Parliament of Finland
- In office 28 April 2015 – 29 May 2015
- Preceded by: Eero Heinäluoma
- Succeeded by: Maria Lohela

Member of the Parliament of Finland
- In office 20 April 2011 – 4 April 2023
- Constituency: Oulu

Leader of the Centre Party
- In office 9 June 2012 – 7 September 2019
- Preceded by: Mari Kiviniemi
- Succeeded by: Katri Kulmuni

Personal details
- Born: 25 April 1961 (age 65) Veteli, Central Ostrobothnia, Finland
- Party: Centre
- Spouse: Minna-Maaria Juntunen
- Children: 5
- Education: University of Oulu

Military service
- Allegiance: Finland
- Branch/service: Finnish Army
- Rank: Captain

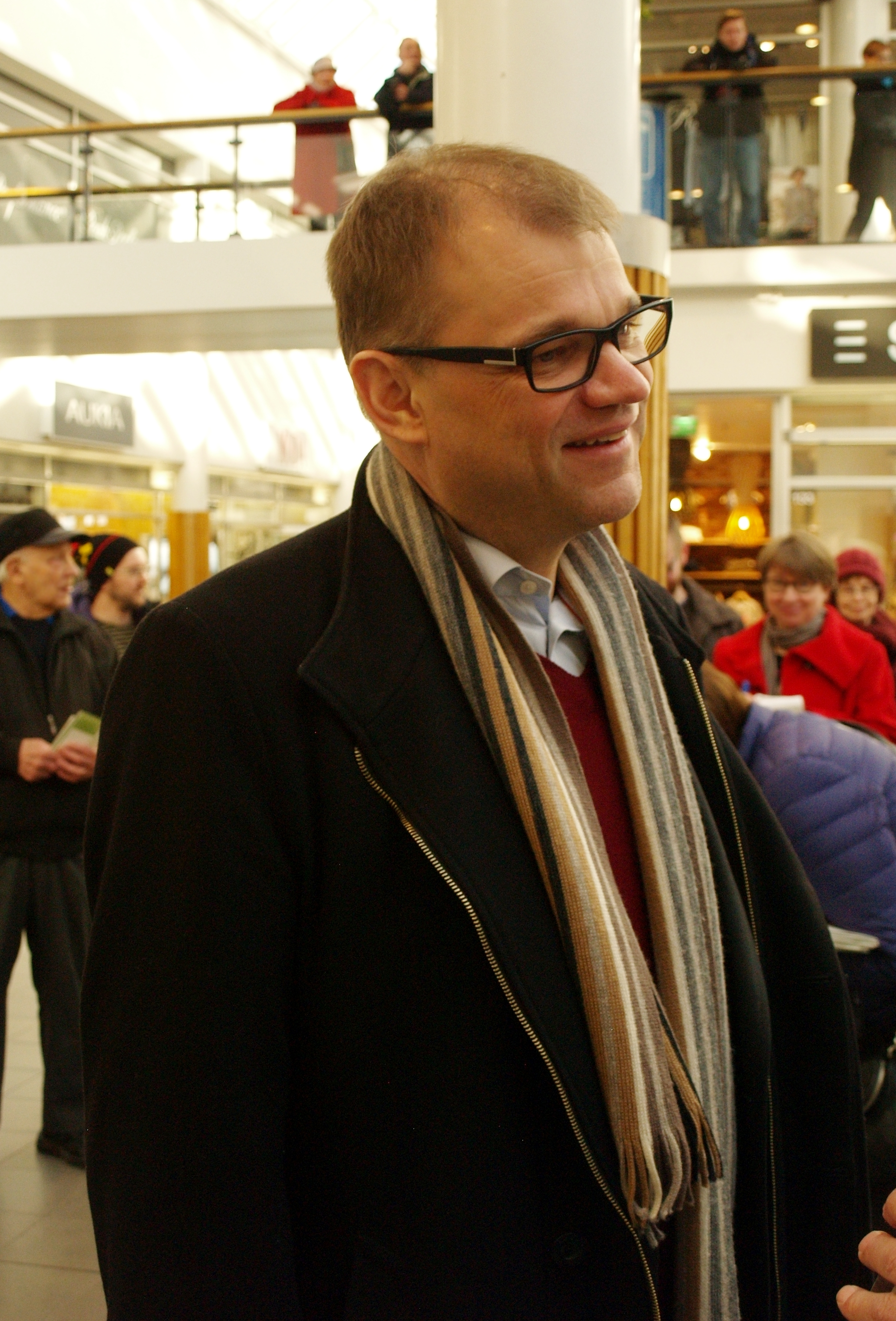
Sipilä in Vaasa, 2015

Juha Petri Sipilä (Note: Finnish pronunciation: [ˈjuhɑ ˈpetri ˈsipilæ]) (born 25 April 1961) is a Finnish former politician who served as Prime Minister of Finland from 2015 to 2019. A relative newcomer to politics, he had a successful background in business. He was the leader of the Centre Party from 2012 to 2019. After leading the Centre party to victory in the 2015 general election, Sipilä formed a centre-right coalition and was appointed prime minister by the Finnish Parliament on 29 May 2015. On 8 March 2019, Sipilä stated his intention to resign as prime minister, citing difficulties in reforming Finland's health care system. President Sauli Niinistö asked him to continue with a caretaker government until a new government coalition was appointed on 6 June 2019 and was ultimately succeeded by Antti Rinne.

== Education and military service ==
Sipilä graduated from Puolanka lukio (Finland's university-preparatory high school), completing the matriculation examination with high marks in 1980. In 1986 Sipilä earned his Master's degree in science (technology) from the University of Oulu.

Sipilä has the rank of captain in the reserves of the Finnish Defence Forces.

== Business ==
Sipilä's career started at Lauri Kuokkanen Ltd., first as a thesis worker and later as a product development manager. Changing jobs, he became a partner and later CEO at Solitra Oy. In 1998, Sipilä started his own business, Fortel Invest Oy. In 2002–2005 he worked as the CEO of Elektrobit Oyj, then returned to his own business.

Sipilä was managing director of Solitra in 1992 and became the main owner in 1994. Sipilä sold Solitra to American ADC Telecommunications in 1996, becoming a multimillionaire from the proceeds. Business ADC Mersum Oy was resold to Remec in 2001.

In 1996, Sipilä's income was the highest in Finland. According to Ilta-Sanomat he has been on the Board of Directors of 120 companies.

=== Chempolis Involvement ===
Juha Sipilä was part-owner in the start-up company Chempolis. According to MOT Program (YLE) in 2012, Chempolis had received 10 million euros in public funds over 15 years along with extra funds from the Finnish Innovation Fund SITRA and Finnish state-owned financing company Finnvera. According to YLE TV News in 2017, the majority state-owned energy company Fortum saved Chempolis from bankruptcy by investing 6 million euros into the company in October 2016. Thereafter, children of Sipilä owned 5% of the company and Fortum 34%. Sipilä had been in control of the state owned companies including Fortum since the end of 2015. The Prime Ministers of Finland have not had the control of state companies previously.

Prime Minister Juha Sipilä lobbied for Chempolis in India in 2016. Chempolis issued a press release on its joint venture with India's Numaligarh Refinery to build a biorefinery in North East India (Assam) for the production of bioethanol following meetings between Prime Minister Narendra Modi, India's Finance Minister Arun Jaitley and Finland's Prime Minister Juha Sipilä on 12–14 February 2016.

== Politics ==
As a student, Sipilä worked for a short time in the Finnish Centre Youth, but otherwise he did not have experience in party politics before being elected to the Finnish Parliament in 2011 with 5,543 personal votes.

In April 2012, Sipilä announced his candidacy for the chairman's position in the party congress of the summer. On June 9, 2012, the party congress elected him chairman. He beat Tuomo Puumala in the second round by 1251 to 872 delegate votes. Sipilä led his party to victory in the 2015 election, where the Centre Party gained 14 seats compared to the previous election. With 30,758 personal votes he was the most popular candidate in the election. Following the election, he was tasked with forming a government coalition; and as the leader of the Centre Party, he began formal negotiations with the Finns Party and the National Coalition Party and formed a three-party majority coalition.

=== Sipilä's Government ===
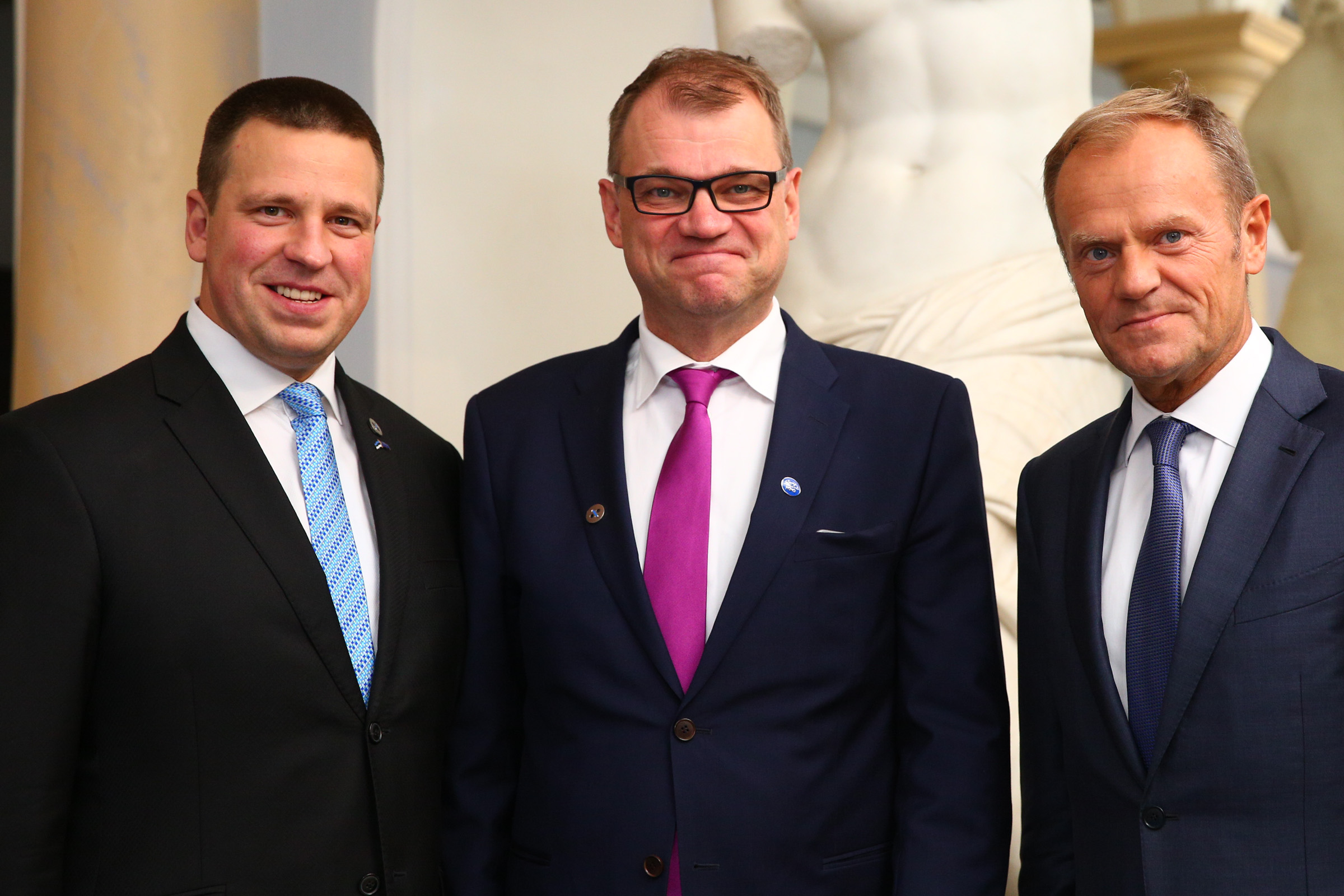
Sipilä with Estonian Prime Minister Jüri Ratas and European Council President Donald Tusk, Tallinn Digital Summit 2017

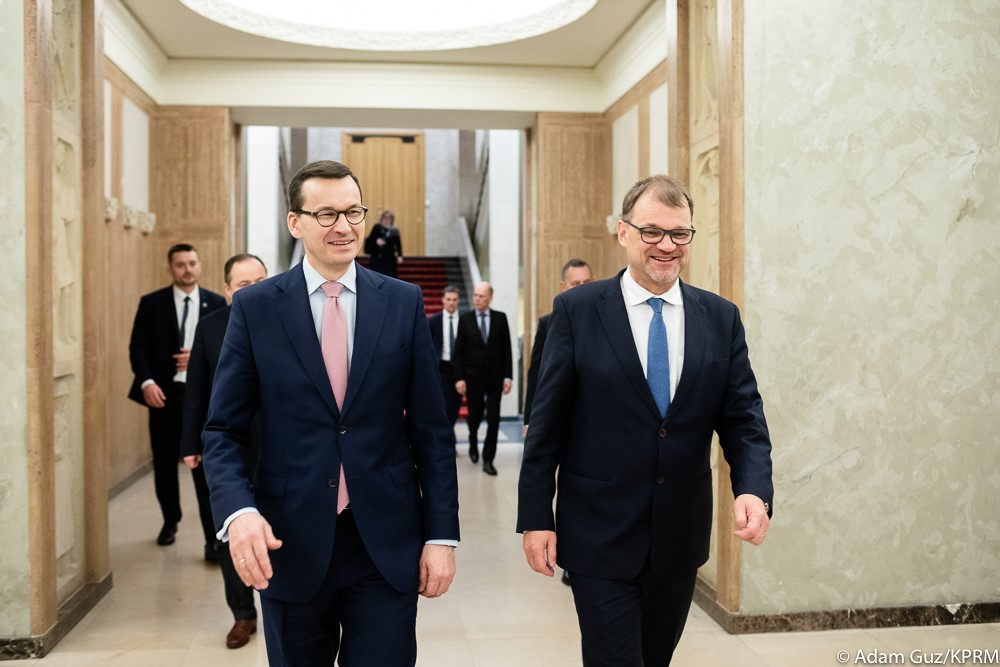
Sipilä and Polish Prime Minister Mateusz Morawiecki on 6 March 2019

Sipilä's government struggled with Finland's poor economic performance, caused according to Paul Krugman and others by the constraints of its eurozone membership and aftershocks from the European debt crisis, but also by the decline of the paper industry, the fall of Nokia and a diminution in exports to Russia. Its attempts to address the problems through policies of spending cuts and reducing labour costs were controversial, particularly cuts to education spending that were seen as threatening Finland's successful public education system. These austerity measures were partly implemented due to European Commission pressure, which urged Finland to improve its adherence to the Stability and Growth Pact and reform its labour market to improve competitiveness. On 22 July 2015, Sipilä announced his government's commitment to reducing Finnish wage costs by 5% by 2019, an internal devaluation caused by Finland's loss of the ability to devalue its currency to boost competitiveness.

There were protests against the government's austerity measures.

In summer 2017, Finns Party split into two parties, namely Blue Reform and the current Finns Party. The Blue Reform members of the former Finns Party, including all ministers, remained in the government after the split.

Following the term of Sipilä Cabinet, the Centre Party was the biggest loser of the 2019 parliamentary election, losing 18 seats and falling from largest party to fourth place. The party's support was lower than in any parliamentary election since 1917. Due to the devastating defeat, Sipilä consequently announced that he would continue as the chairman only until Centre Party's next convention in September 2019.

=== Talvivaara and Yleisradio scandal ===
In 2016, Sipiläs close relatives were revealed to be part-owners of the bankrupt Talvivaara Mining Company, later renamed and re-organised into the company Terrafame, which had received considerable funds from the Finnish government. A Parliamentary Ombudsman later decided that Sipilä didn't face a conflict of interest over mine deal.

However, it was later revealed that Sipilä had contacted Yleisradio in order to instruct them on how to report on the Talvivaara and Terrafame incidents, leading to suspicion that YLE had been politically pressured.

== Personal life ==
=== Family ===
Sipilä grew up in the small town of Puolanka, northern Finland, north of Kajaani, the firstborn of four children to mother Pirkko and father Pentti Sipilä, an elementary school teacher.

In 1981, Sipilä married Minna-Maaria Juntunen at Oulu Cathedral. They have five children. Their youngest son, Tuomo (born in 1993), died on 18 February 2015.

=== Wood Gas Venture ===
Sipilä is known for his interest in wood gas electricity generation, which began as a hobby. The cost to bring power to his summer cottage seemed too high, and he became interested in wood gas. First, he produced the electricity with wind power and with a diesel generator, but then he started building wood gas plants. He converted an old Chevrolet El Camino into "El Kamina" (Kamiina means "stove" in Finnish.) powered by wood gas, with electronic control systems. This hobby was spun off into a company, Volter Oy, which produces wood gas power plants. A 10-house ecovillage in Kempele is powered by one such power plant.

=== Religious affiliation ===
The Sipiläs are members of Rauhan Sana (transl. "Word of Peace", affiliated in North America with ALCA), a small Laestadian revivalist denomination within the state Lutheran church of Finland. The Sipiläs first met at a Laestadian summer camp as teenagers. Sipilä has stated he does not consider himself a legalistic Laestadian, and in interviews he has carefully distinguished his own Laestadian denomination from his home region's other, predominant, exclusive Laestadian group (Conservative Laestadianism). The chairman of board in Juha Sipilä's religious community was his wife's brother in 2015. According to Juha Sipilä, in 2012 he participated in the International Christian Chamber of Commerce ICCC.

=== Aircraft ownership ===
Juha Sipilä owned an airplane named Mooney Ovation 2 in 2018. Earlier he had a one-third ownership interest in a helicopter and another aircraft. In 2018 he promised to compensate all climate change gas emissions from his air travel by cultivating trees with his own hands.

== Electoral history ==
=== Parliamentary elections ===
Year	Electoral district	Votes	Percentage	Result
2011	Oulu	5,543	2.27%	Elected
2015	Oulu	30,758	12.32%	Elected
2019	Oulu	16,688	6.41%	Elected

=== Municipal elections ===
Year	Municipality	Votes	Percentage	Result
2012	Kempele	755	11.69%	Elected

== Cabinets ==
- Sipilä Cabinet

Party political offices
Preceded by Mari Kiviniemi	Leader of the Centre Party; 2012–2019	Succeeded by Katri Kulmuni
Political offices
Preceded by Eero Heinäluoma	Speaker of the Parliament of Finland; 2015	Succeeded by Maria Lohela
Preceded by Alexander Stubb	Prime Minister of Finland; 2015–2019	Succeeded by Antti Rinne
