= Finns Party =

Finnish political party

Finns Party Perussuomalaiset (Finnish) Sannfinländarna (Swedish)
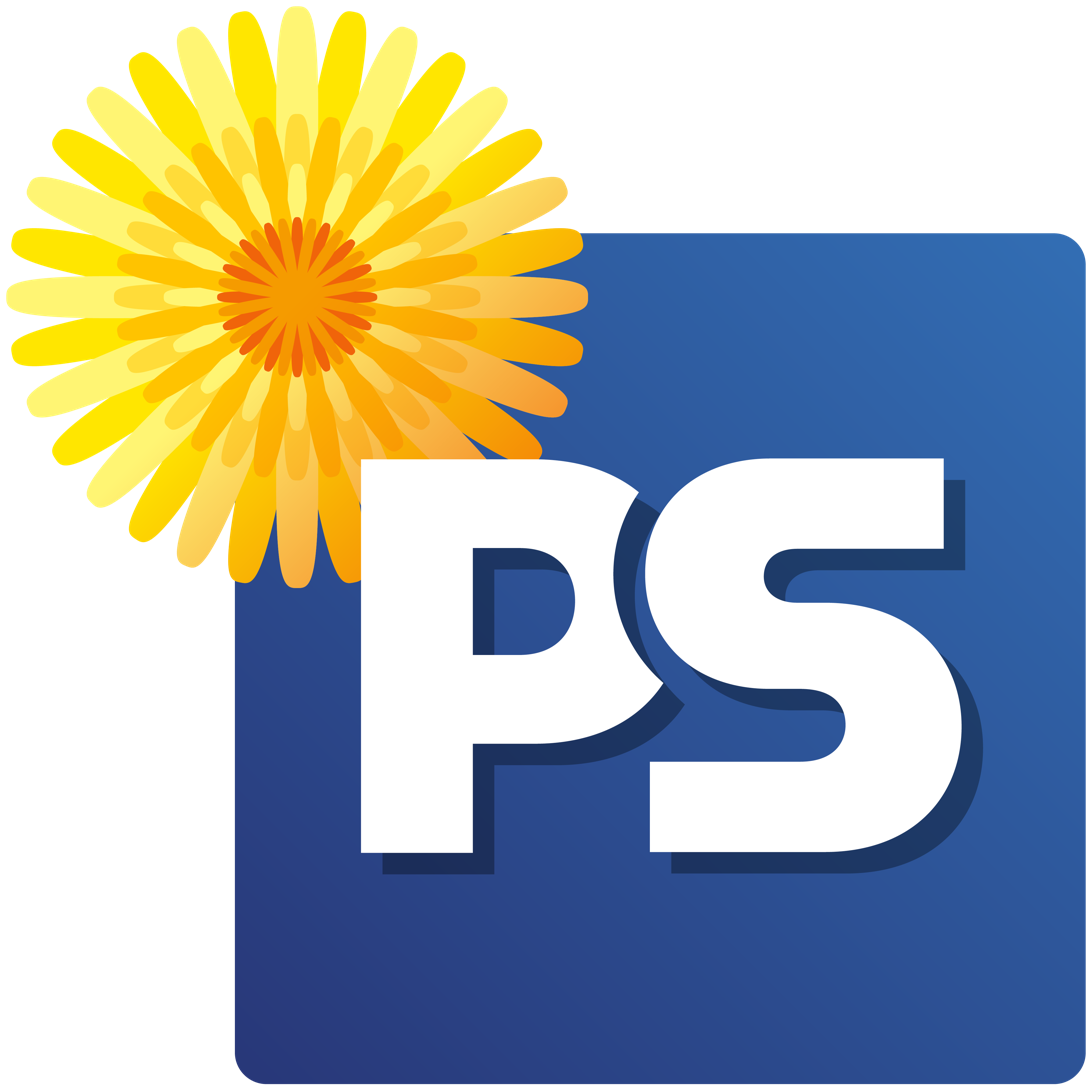
- Abbreviation: PS; Sannf
- Chairperson: Riikka Purra
- Secretary: Harri Vuorenpää
- Parliamentary group leader: Jani Mäkelä
- First deputy chair: Teemu Keskisarja
- Founders: Timo Soini; Raimo Vistbacka; Kari Bärlund; Urpo Leppänen
- Founded: 11 May 1995
- Preceded by: Finnish Rural Party (de facto)
- Headquarters: Yrjönkatu 8–10B, 00120 Helsinki
- Newspaper: Perussuomalainen (magazine); Suomen Uutiset
- Think tank: Suomen Perusta
- Youth wing: Finns Party Youth (2006–2020); The Finns Party Youth (2020–)
- Women's wing: Finns Party Women
- Men's wing: PerusÄijät
- Worker's wing: Peruspuurtajat
- Membership (2021): ▼15,700
- Ideology: National conservatism; Right-wing populism; Euroscepticism
- Political position: Right-wing to far-right
- European affiliation: ECR Party (since 2026)
- European Parliament group: ECR Group (since 2023) (Note: The party was formerly part of EFD (2009–2014), the ECR Group (2014–2019) and the ID Group (2019–2023).)
- Nordic affiliation: Nordic Freedom
- Colours: Gold; Dark blue; White
- Eduskunta: 46 / 200
- European Parliament: 1 / 15
- Municipalities: 651 / 8,586
- County seats: 105 / 1,379

Website
- perussuomalaiset.fi

The Finns Party (Finnish: Perussuomalaiset [ˈperusˌsuo̯mɑlɑi̯set], PS; Swedish: Sannfinländarna, Sannf), formerly known as the True Finns, (Note: The party did not have an official English name until 2011, but the name 'True Finns' was originally used by the party itself and is still occasionally used by the international media. The party's Finnish name has always remained the same and Perussuomalaiset would effectively translate as 'Ordinary Finns', 'Regular Finns' or 'Typical Finns'. In August 2011, the party began using 'The Finns' as an official English name – the party chairman at the time, Timo Soini, said that the new name captured the image of the movement as a party of ordinary Finns. However, the party's and the Finnish parliament's English-language websites use the less confusing name, the 'Finns Party'.) is a national conservative political party in Finland. It was founded in 1995 following the dissolution of the Finnish Rural Party.

The party achieved its electoral breakthrough in the 2011 Finnish parliamentary election, when it won 19.1% of votes, becoming the third largest party in the Parliament of Finland.

In the 2015 election the party got 17.7% of the votes, making it the parliament's second-largest political party. The party was in opposition for the first twenty years of its existence. In 2015, it joined the coalition government formed by Prime Minister Juha Sipilä.

Following a 2017 split, over half of the party's MPs left the parliamentary group and were subsequently expelled from their membership in the party. This defector group, Blue Reform, continued to support the government coalition, while the Finns Party went into opposition. The party, having been reduced to 17 seats after the split, increased its representation to 39 seats in the 2019 Finnish parliamentary election, while Blue Reform failed to win any seats.

During the 2023 Finnish parliamentary election, the Finns Party finished in second place with 46 seats, recording their strongest result since its founding. They then, out of Petteri Orpo's request, proceeded to form a coalition government with the winning National Coalition Party, the Christian Democrats and Swedish People's Party of Finland. The party currently holds 7 of 19 ministerial portfolios in the Orpo Cabinet.

== History ==
=== Finnish Rural Party ===
The predecessor of the Finns Party was the Finnish Rural Party (SMP), founded by Agrarian League dissident Veikko Vennamo in 1959. Vennamo ran into serious disagreement with Arvo Korsimo, the Agrarian League's party secretary, and was excluded from the parliamentary group. As a result, Vennamo immediately started building his own organization and founded the Finnish Rural Party. Vennamo was a populist and became a critic of President Urho Kekkonen and of political corruption within the "old parties", particularly the Centre Party (the renamed Agrarian League). The Rural Party achieved two major victories in the elections of 1970 and 1983, winning 18 and 17 seats, respectively.

In the 1970s, Vennamo's personalized leadership style alienated some in the party, which led to a split in the parliamentary group in 1972. After the Rural Party's new rise in 1983 under Vennamo's son Pekka, the party became a partner in two coalition governments. However, the party's support declined steadily in the late-1980s and early-1990s. In 1995, the party won only one seat in the Finnish Parliament and soon filed for bankruptcy.

=== Founding of the Finns Party and its rise in popularity ===
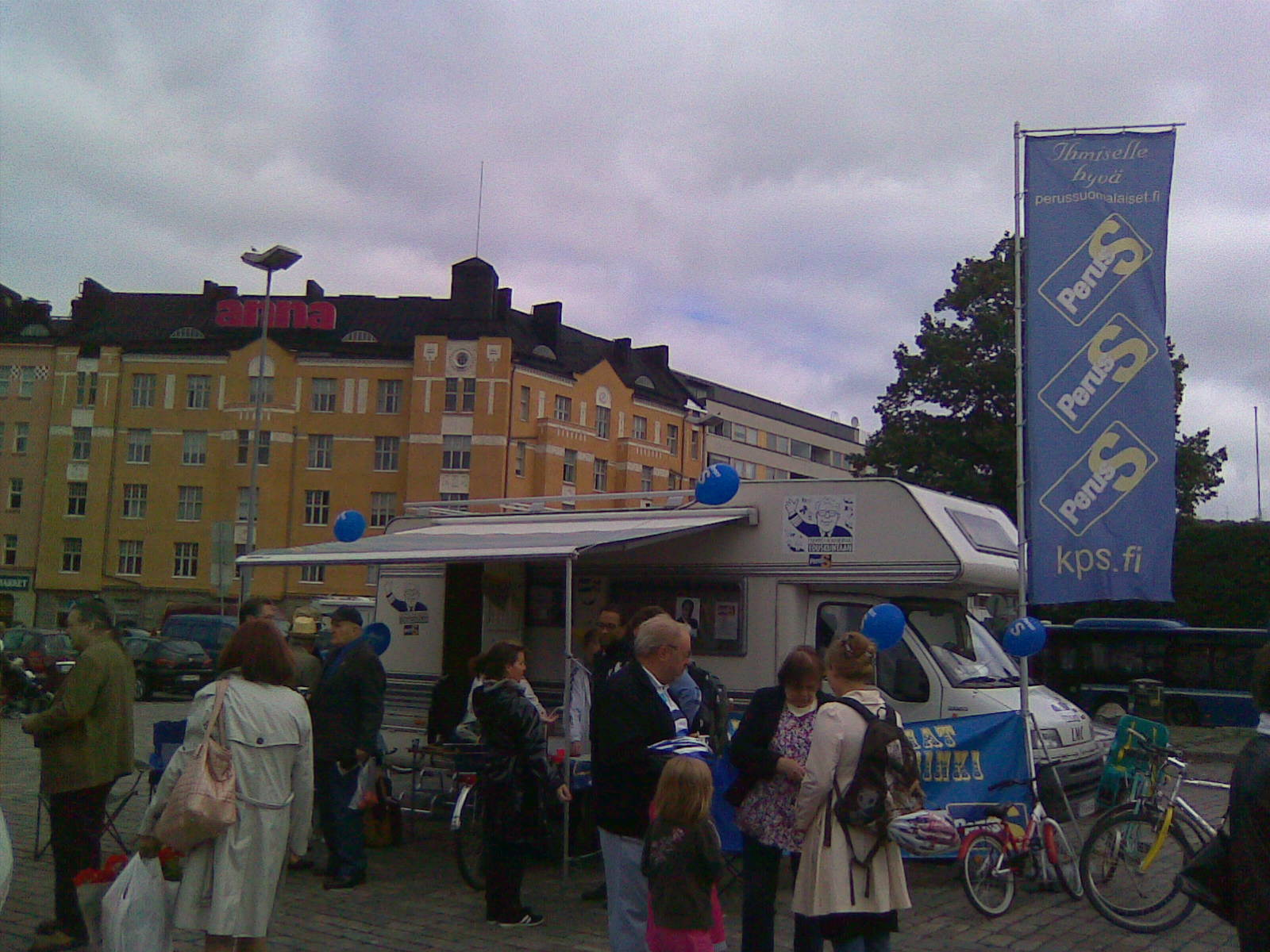
Stall at Hakaniemi square, Helsinki in 2010

In the summer of 1995, following the collapse of the Finnish Rural Party, the decision to found the Finns Party was made by Timo Soini, Raimo Vistbacka, Urpo Leppänen and Kari Bärlund. Soini had been the Rural Party's last party secretary and Vistbacka its last chair and MP. The party collected the five thousand signatures needed for registration and was added to the official party register on 13 October 1995. The first party congress was held in November. Vistbacka was elected party chair and Soini the party secretary.

It took some time before the Finns Party gained ground in Finnish elections. At the time of its founding in 1995, the party's sole MP was Vistbacka, who was reelected in the 1999 election. In 2003, the party won three seats: besides Vistbacka, Soini and Tony Halme were elected. In the 2007, the party gained two further seats for a total of five. In the 2008 municipal election, the Finns Party were most successful in those districts where the Social Democrats and the Left Alliance lost most. In the 2011 election, the Centre Party suffered the largest blow from the Finns Party's success.

According to a 2008–2009 study, Finns Party supporters viewed themselves as centrist: on a scale where 1 was extreme left and 10 was extreme right, the average supporter placed themselves at 5.4. According to the same study, the supporters were united by patriotism and social conservatism. A 2011 study indicated that the Finns Party was the most popular party among voters with an annual income of 35,000–50,000 euros, while over a quarter of the party's voters earn over 50,000 per year. The same study also indicated that the party's voters included a higher percentage of blue-collar workers than those of the social democrats.

==== Timo Soini ====
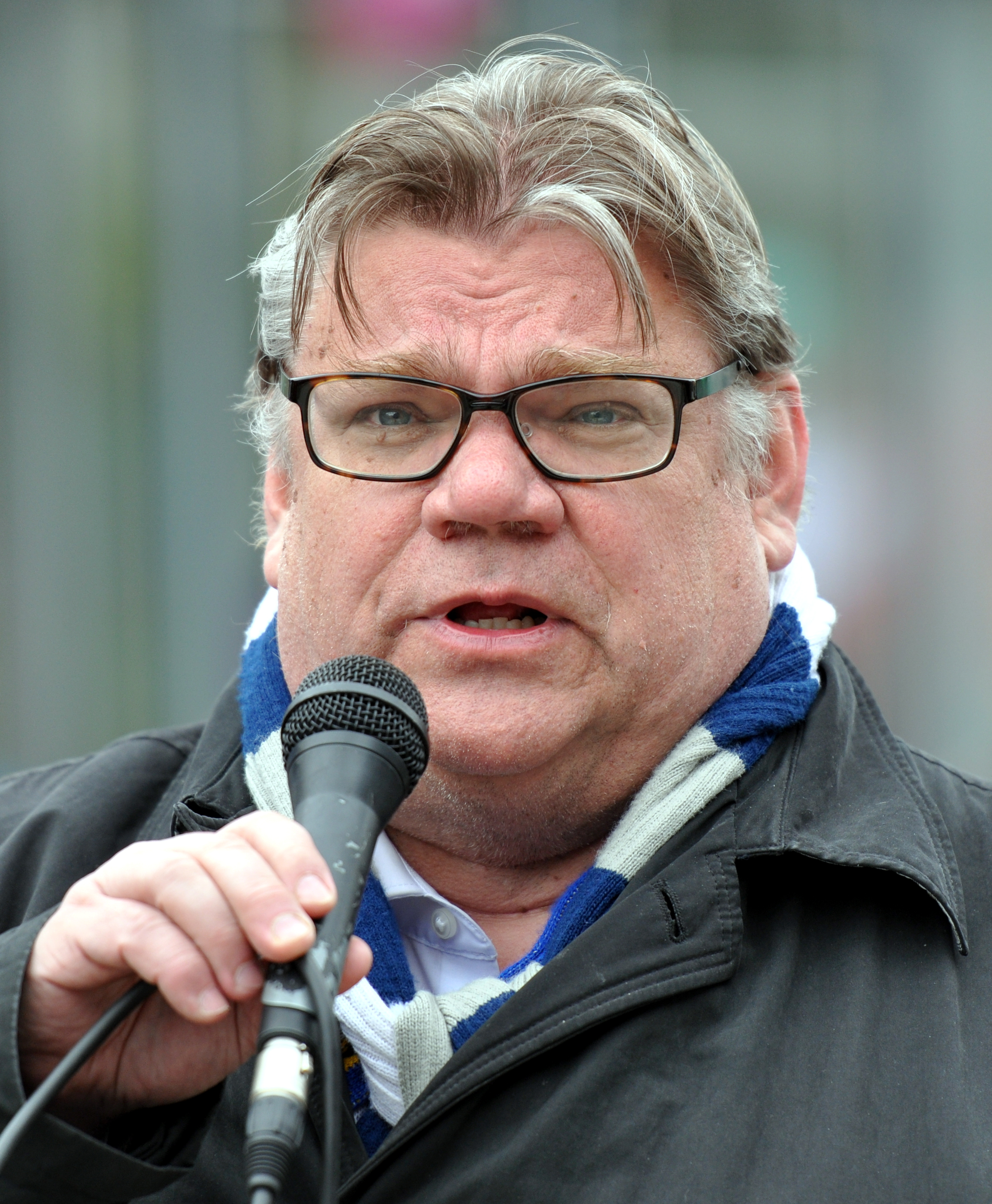
Timo Soini, chairperson for twenty years

Timo Soini led the Finns Party for twenty years, from 1997 until 2017. He was first elected to the parliament in 2003. He was the party's candidate in the 2006 presidential election, and was elected to the European Parliament in 2009 with the highest personal vote share in the country. He served as an MEP for two years, returning to the Finnish parliament in the 2011 election. Soini was the party's presidential candidate for a second time in the election of 2012. Jussi Halla-aho succeeded Soini as party chair in 2017.

=== 2011–2017 ===
The Finns Party obtained 39 seats in the 2011 election, making them the third largest party, narrowly behind the National Coalition Party (44) and the Social Democrats (42). Soini received 43,212 personal votes, the highest number of all candidates, leaving behind the Foreign Minister Alexander Stubb and the Finance Minister Jyrki Katainen in their Uusimaa electoral district. The popularity of the party rose from 4.1% to 19.1% in just four years. Helsingin Sanomat wrote in an editorial that the party and Soini had "rewritten the electoral history books". According to political analyst Jan Sundberg, Soini had the ability to appeal to common people and make complicated things look easy. The election result was also referred to as "shocking" and "exceptional".

After the election, the National Coalition Party (NCP) began negotiations aiming to form a cabinet between the NCP, the Social Democrats, and the Finns Party. However, when it became clear that the NCP and the Social Democrats would continue to support EU bailouts, which the Finns Party vehemently opposed during the electoral campaign, the party voluntarily broke from the negotiations to become the leading opposition party. Soini said that the party would not compromise its core principles just to enter the government. According to an opinion poll, most of the party's supporters accepted this decision.

The Finns Party's popularity initially continued to rise after the 2011 election: in one opinion poll from June 2011 gave the party a record popularity of 23%. The party's membership rose to over 8,000 members by 2013 (up from circa 5,500 in 2011 and circa 1,000 in 2005). Membership in the party's youth organisation rose as well, going from 800 before the 2011 election to over 2,200 in 2013.

The party nominated Soini as its candidate for the 2012 presidential election; Soini finished fourth with 9.4%. Soini interpreted the result by saying that half of the party's voters wanted him for president, while the other half wanted to him to remain as party chair. In municipal elections later in 2012, the party got 12.3% of votes and 1,195 seats in the municipal councils, up more than 750 from the previous municipal election. However, this result saw the votes for the party shrink significantly from the 2011 parliamentary election result. The party got 12.9% of votes in the 2014 European Parliament election and increased its number of MEPs to two.

In the 2015 election, the Finns Party got 17.7% of the votes and 38 seats. This meant that they were the third largest party by votes but the second largest party by seats. The Finns Party subsequently entered into a coalition government with the Centre Party and the NCP, led by Prime Minister Juha Sipilä. The party's participation in the Sipilä Cabinet marked a softening of its Eurosceptic positions. On 22 June 2016, Finns Party MP Maria Tolppanen joined the Social Democrats, after which the Finns Party had 37 seats in the parliament. In March 2017, Soini announced that he would step down as party chair in the next party congress in June.

=== 2017 leadership election and splits ===
In June 2017, Jussi Halla-aho and Sampo Terho faced off in the leadership election, in which Halla-aho received 949 votes against Terho's 646 votes and thus succeeded Soini as party chair. Sipilä and Minister of Finance Petteri Orpo soon announced that they would not continue their coalition with the Finns Party if it was led by Halla-aho. Subsequently, twenty Finns Party MPs, including Soini and Terho, defected to form a new parliamentary group under the name New Alternative, later renamed to Blue Reform and after that, in 2022, into Finnish Reform Movement. As all cabinet ministers were among the defectors, the then Blue Reform made an agreement with Sipilä to stay in the government.

Following the split, MPs Veera Ruoho and Arja Juvonen left the Finns Party parliamentary group to continue as independents, after which the party's seats were reduced to fifteen. All of the defecting MPs were subsequently expelled from the Finns Party. In the following weeks, MPs Ritva Elomaa and Arja Juvonen regretted their decision and re-joined the party, raising the amount of MPs to seventeen.

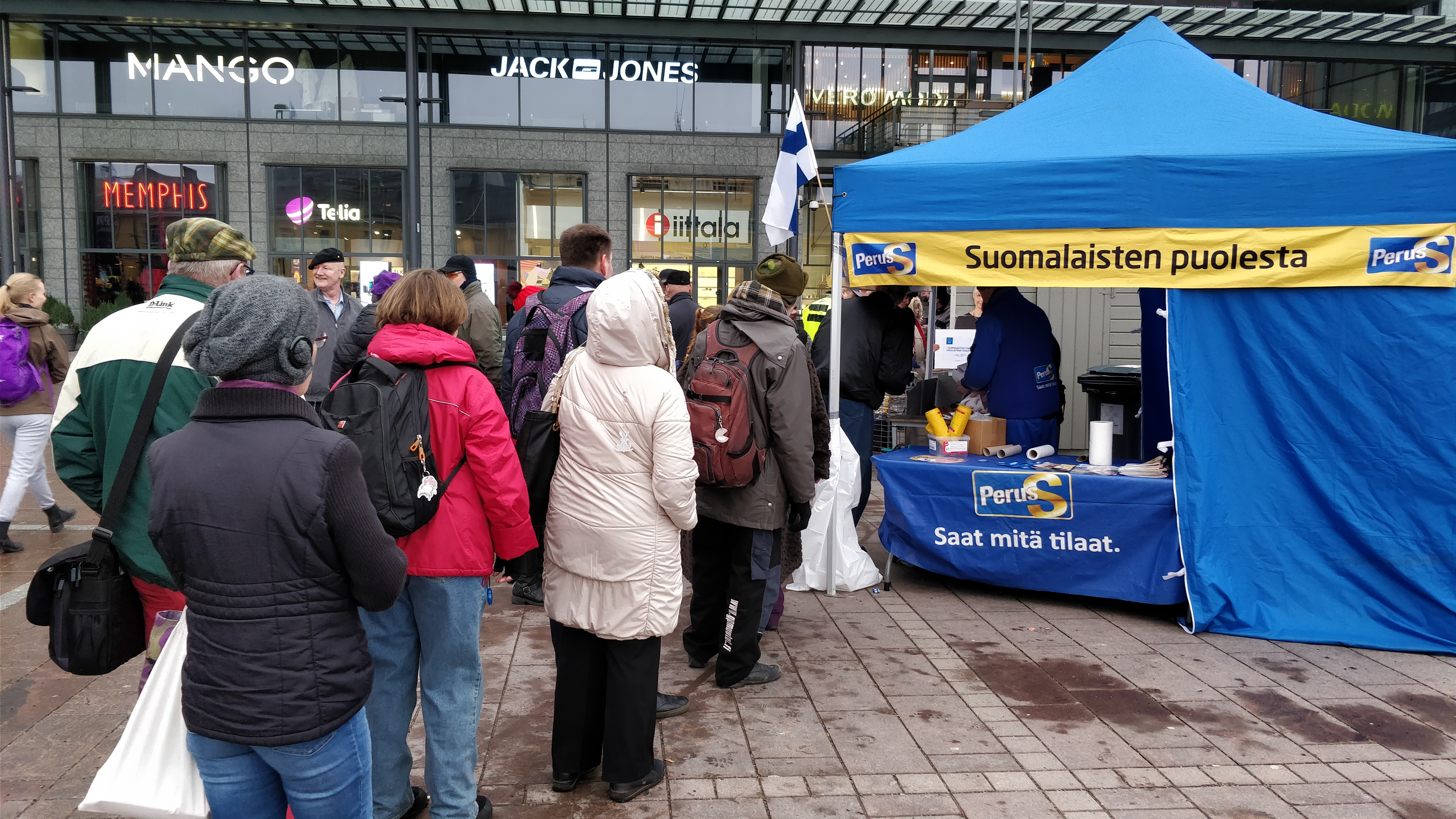
Election tent in 2018

The party nominated MP Laura Huhtasaari as its candidate for the 2018 presidential election. In the election, Huhtasaari placed third with 6.9 percent of the votes, while the incumbent president Sauli Niinistö went on to secure his second term with a majority of votes.

=== 2019 general election and revival ===
At the 2019 Finnish parliamentary election, the Finns Party finished in second place and increased its number of MPs to 39 (with its strongest result being in Satakunta) while the breakaway Blue Reform party lost all of its seats.

On 21 June 2021, Jussi Halla-aho announced that he would retire from his position as a party leader in August 2021. He was succeeded by MP Riikka Purra on 14 August.

Since 2020, further minor splits have emerged within the party, forming the Power Belongs to the People party and Blue-and-Black Movement.

During the 2023 Finnish parliamentary election the party finished in second place ahead of the Social Democrats with 20% of the vote and 46 seats, marking the strongest result to date for the party.

In April 2023, National Coalition Party leader Petteri Orpo announced his attention to form a governing coalition with the Finns Party, Swedish People's Party, and the Christian Democrats.

In the Orpo Cabinet, the Finns have 7 ministerial portfolios out of 19. Former party leader Jussi Halla-aho was elected Speaker of the Parliament of Finland in 2023.

=== In the European Parliament ===
When the Finns Party first gained representation in the European Parliament in 2009, it became a founding member of the Europe of Freedom and Democracy Group (EFD) in the Parliament. After the 2014 election, the party chose to leave the EFD to join the European Conservatives and Reformists Group (ECR). Commenting on the party's choice of group, party secretary Riikka Slunga-Poutsalo said in 2014 that joining a right-wing parliamentary group would not change the party's characteristic of being a "centre-left workers' party". After the 2019 election, the party joined the Identity and Democracy Group; however, this decision was reverted after the 2023 parliamentary election, with the Finns Party rejoining the ECR after a four-year break.

== Ideology ==
Ideologically, the Finns Party has been described as right-wing and far-right. It is a nationalist and national-conservative party that opposes immigration, while on foreign stances it is Eurosceptic. The party combines right-wing economic policies (such as fiscal austerity) and economic nationalism with socially conservative values, and ethnic nationalism. Several scholars have described them as radically right-wing populist. In the parliament seating order, the party was seated in the centre of the plenary until 2019 when it was moved to the right of the plenary despite the party's opposition to the move. Some of the party's supporters have described themselves as centrists. The party has drawn people from left-wing parties but central aspects of their manifesto have gained support from right-wing voters as well. (Note: For instance, part nine of the 2011 manifesto reads: "[True] Finnish immigration policy should be based on the fact that the Finns should always be able to decide for themselves the conditions under which a foreigner can come to our country and reside in our country.") The Finns Party has been compared by international media to the other Nordic populist parties and other similar nationalist and right-wing populist movements in Europe. It also calls for austerity policies to curb deficit spending.

== Policies and platform ==
In evaluating the Finns Party's 70-page programme for the 2011 election, Mikko Lahtinen, political scientist in the University of Tampere, and Markku Hyrkkänen, historian of ideas in the University of Turku, note that nationalism is a theme consistently repeated throughout the programme. According to them, the party presents populism as a noble ideology, which seeks to empower the people. Lahtinen describes the rhetoric used in the program as a refreshing change to the politically correct "jargon" of mainstream media, and believes that the Finns Party may have succeeded in gaining supporters from the traditional left-wing parties by presenting a more attractive form of criticism of neoliberalism than those parties.

Ville Pernaa, political scientist, described the party's 2015 electoral program by stating that the Finns combine elements of both right-wing and left-wing politics along with populist rhetoric.

=== Economic policy ===
In the party's 2011 programme, the Finns Party advocated a more progressive taxation system and support for the welfare state. The party opposed the establishment of a flat tax and called for the raising of the capital gains tax and the re-institution of the wealth tax. According to the party, the willingness to pay taxes is best guaranteed by a society unified by correct social policies – the electoral program warns against individualist policies, which weaken the solidarity among citizens. "The willingness to pay taxes is guaranteed by having a unified people", the program reads (p. 46).

Some observers compared the Finns Party's fiscal policies to the old national Social Democratic taxation policy, which has given the left-wing brand to the Finns Party. During the electoral campaign in 2011 Soini stated that he preferred the Social Democrats over the centre-right National Coalition Party as a possible coalition partner in a future cabinet. Soini has stated that the Finns are a "workers' party without socialism". A researcher for the opinion polling company Taloustutkimus agreed, describing the Finns Party as a "non-socialist workers' party".

The party's programme on rural policy also called for state support for rural regions, particularly agriculture, suggesting state subsidies to relieve the effect of structural changes on the rural areas. This policy is shared by the Centre Party in Finland and originates from the agrarian and rural policies of both parties.

The Finns Party favours increasing state investments in infrastructure and industry as well. A tendency towards favouring old industrial policies have led some political analysts to label the Finns Party as a centre-left party.

=== Energy policy ===
The Finns Party aspires to energy self-reliance and supports nuclear energy. The party calls for a pro-industry environmental policy, opposing green tax reform and taxpayers' involvement in emission trading funds.

The party strongly supports the peat industry, which produces greenhouse gases, having even proposed exempting this production from any tax. The party generally scores best in municipalities whose economies are tied to this industry. The party has strongly denounced the Paris Agreement, signed in December 2015, saying it was "catastrophic" for the economy, and demanded that the private sector and taxpayers be spared its "disastrous economic consequences".

=== Sociocultural policy ===
The Finns Party rejects the existence of nonbinary genders, and opposes same-sex marriage, same-sex adoption and in vitro fertilisation given to same-sex couples and single women.

The party supports teaching "healthy national pride" in schools, "because the unity of citizens is the basis of society", and wants to promote support for cultural activities that "promote Finnish identity".

The party also calls for the removal of the obligatory character of the second official language (Swedish in Finnish-language schools and vice versa) in curriculums on all levels of education, freeing up time for the learning of other foreign languages such as English, German, French, Spanish and Russian (especially in the eastern part of the country). Allowance regarding the use of the Swedish language and its teaching will have to be made for those municipalities where Swedish-speakers are in the majority or a large percentage of the population – Swedish is one of Finland's national languages.

The cultural program of the Finns Party, which proposed subsidizing traditional art over postmodern art, prompted criticism from outside the party and generated debate within the party as well. Some critics of the policy called it overtly populist or said that the state should not interfere with the content of art. A poll commissioned by Helsingin Sanomat at the time of the controversy found that a majority of Finns, 51%, agreed with the party's stance on ending subsidies for postmodern art.

=== Immigration policy ===
Regarding immigration policy, the party's 2011 manifesto emphasises welcoming work-based immigration, provided the immigrants pay taxes and abide by Finnish labour laws; deporting immigrants guilty of serious or recurrent crimes or those that do not meet the Immigration laws; limiting family reunification to proven direct close relatives only, and requiring means of subsistence from the immigrant; limiting humanitarian immigration strictly to refugee quotas (which should be adapted to correspond with the economic situation); and granting the Finnish nationality after five years of residence in Finland, provided the immigrant masters Finnish, has no criminal record, and has means of subsistence.

The party also requires that immigrants accept Finnish sociocultural norms. The only written declaration to the European Parliament made by a True Finns' MEP also concerns immigration matters. The party underlines the role of national sovereignty in immigration issues:

[True] Finnish immigration policy should be based on the fact that the Finns should always be able to decide for themselves the conditions under which a foreigner can come to our country and reside in our country.

— Program for the 2011 election (p. 40)

In 2015, the party's immigration programme included demands like lowering the refugee quota, tightening the conditions of family unification, ending affirmative action, outlawing begging in public places, opposing the use of public funds to advance multiculturalism, opposition to the planned burden-sharing mechanisms of the Common European Asylum Policy, making sure that immigrants living on welfare benefits are not concentrated in the same areas and only allowing the immigration of workers from outside the EU and EEA if they are found to be necessary in a given field in a means test by the Finnish Labour Office.

In their 2019 election manifesto, the party called for a prohibition on wearing the burqa and the niqāb in public.

Timo Soini signed a pan-European charter against racism in 1998. However, in 2009, before the European Parliament election, Soini refused to sign an anti-racism appeal, saying that the appeal was an attempt to influence the party's choice of candidates (the appeal was drawn up by another political party). All other Finnish parties signed this appeal against racism. In May 2011, following controversies surrounding the remarks of the Finns Party's MP Teuvo Hakkarainen, the Finns Party's parliamentary group issued a statement condemning all racism and discrimination, including affirmative action. The party invited other parties to sign the statement as well, but no other party did so. In December 2011, an opinion poll revealed 51% of Finns Party voters agreed with the statement, "Joihinkin rotuihin kuuluvat ihmiset eivät kerta kaikkiaan sovi asumaan moderniin yhteiskuntaan;" "People of certain races are unable to live within (fit into) a modern society."

=== Foreign policy ===
The Finns Party is opposed to integration in the European Union and to Finland's Eurozone membership. The party also calls for reductions in foreign aid.

The party believes in national sovereignty:

[T]he eternal and unlimited right to always decide freely and independently of all of one's affairs lies only and solely with the people, which forms a nation separate of others.

— Program for the 2011 election (p. 7)

==== European Union ====
Shortly after the leadership election of Jussi Halla-aho, the party hardened its position towards the European Union. In 2017, Laura Huhtasaari stated that she would support leaving the EU should she win the 2018 Finnish presidential election citing the growth of the Union's power at the expense of the member states. Other party members have supported the idea of Finland withdrawing from both the Schengen Agreement and the Eurozone. In its latest platform, the Finns Party states that it supports a "European policy" based on appreciation for Western and Christian shaped values. The party argues that Finland is needed in the European Parliament to defend Finnish interests in the short-term, but states the "long-term strategic goal" is to take gradual steps to withdraw Finland from the European Union and proposes introducing a parallel currency within Finland to initiate phasing out Finnish membership of the Eurozone.

In 2023, Halla-aho reiterated that the party's long-term goal is strategic preparation for a "Fixit" (Finnish exit) from the European Union and Eurozone, highlighting what he described as a "democratic deficit" within the EU while Foreign Trade Minister Ville Tavio stated the party will vote against joint-EU debt policies in government. However, the party leadership stated that it also wished to strengthen European unity and cooperation in the meantime in response to Russia's invasion of Ukraine.

==== Defence ====
Timo Soini has been an outspoken critic of both the EU and NATO, but has stated that if a choice had to be made, NATO is a lesser evil than the EU. The Finns Party favors non-alliance or neutrality, as international activities abroad for the Defence Forces would undermine the defence budget's funds for sustaining a large conscript army of war-time personnel (which is 350,000) to guarantee the defence of all of Finland. When the Finnish Parliament voted to ratify the Ottawa Treaty, banning anti-personnel mines, in November 2011, the Finns Party was the only party unified in opposing the treaty.

Initially, the party was opposed to Finnish admission into NATO in its 2011 program. However, following the Russian invasion of Ukraine, the party signaled a change to this policy and stated it was willing to back NATO membership.

=== Judicial policy ===
During the 2011 election, the party's judicial programme included the opposition to any incorporation of Sharia law into Finnish judicial practices, giving more resources for police and prosecutors and imposing tougher punishments for violent crimes.

== Election results ==
Finns Party results by constituency, 2023 parliamentary election
Constituency	Votes (%)	Avg. result +/− (pp)
Lapland	26.8	9.6
Satakunta	26.6	2.6
Oulu	25.4	5.1
Häme	24.4	3.4
South-Eastern Finland	22.8	3.9
Vaasa	21.3	4.2
Central Finland	20.5	2.4
Pirkanmaa	20.2	2.8
Varsinais-Suomi	20.0	0.8
Savo-Karelia	20.0	2.0
Uusimaa	18.2	2.3
Helsinki	11.3	-1.0
Finland (total)	20.1	+2.6

=== Parliamentary elections ===
Election	Votes	%	Seats	+/–	Government
1999	26,440	0.99	1 / 200		Opposition
2003	43,816	1.57	3 / 200	▲2	Opposition
2007	112,256	4.05	5 / 200	▲2	Opposition
2011	560,075	19.05	39 / 200	▲34	Opposition
2015	524,054	17.65	38 / 200	▼1	Coalition (2015–2017)
2015	524,054	17.65	38 / 200	▼1	Opposition (2017–2019)
2019	538,805	17.48	39 / 200	▲1	Opposition
2023	620,981	20.06	46 / 200	▲7	Coalition

=== Presidential elections ===
Election year	Candidate	1st round			2nd round			Result
Election year	Candidate	Votes	%	Rank	Votes	%	Rank	Result
2000	Ilkka Hakalehto	31,405	1.03	6th	—N/a			Lost
2006	Timo Soini	103,368	3.43	5th	—N/a			Lost
2012	Timo Soini	287,571	9.40	4th	—N/a			Lost
2018	Laura Huhtasaari	207,337	6.93	3rd	—N/a			Lost
2024	Jussi Halla-aho	615,487	19.0	3rd	—N/a			Lost

=== European Parliament elections ===
Election	Votes	%	Seats	+/–	EP Group
1996	15,004	0.67 (#10)	0 / 16	New	–
1999	9,854	0.79 (#9)	0 / 16	0	–
2004	8,900	0.54 (#9)	0 / 14	0	–
2009	162,930	9.79 (#5)	1 / 13	▲1	EFD
2014	222,457	12.87 (#3)	2 / 13	▲1	ECR
2019	252,990	13.83 (#4)	2 / 13	0	ID
2024	139,160	7.61 (#6)	1 / 15	▼1	ECR

=== Municipal elections ===
Election	Votes	%	Councillors
1996	21,999	0.93	138
2000	14,712	0.66	109
2004	21,417	0.90	106
2008	137,497	5.39	443
2012	307,797	12.34	1,195
2017	227,297	8.8	770
2021	354,236	14.5	1,351
2025	184,616	7.6	651

== Organisation ==
Logo used from 2014 to 2026

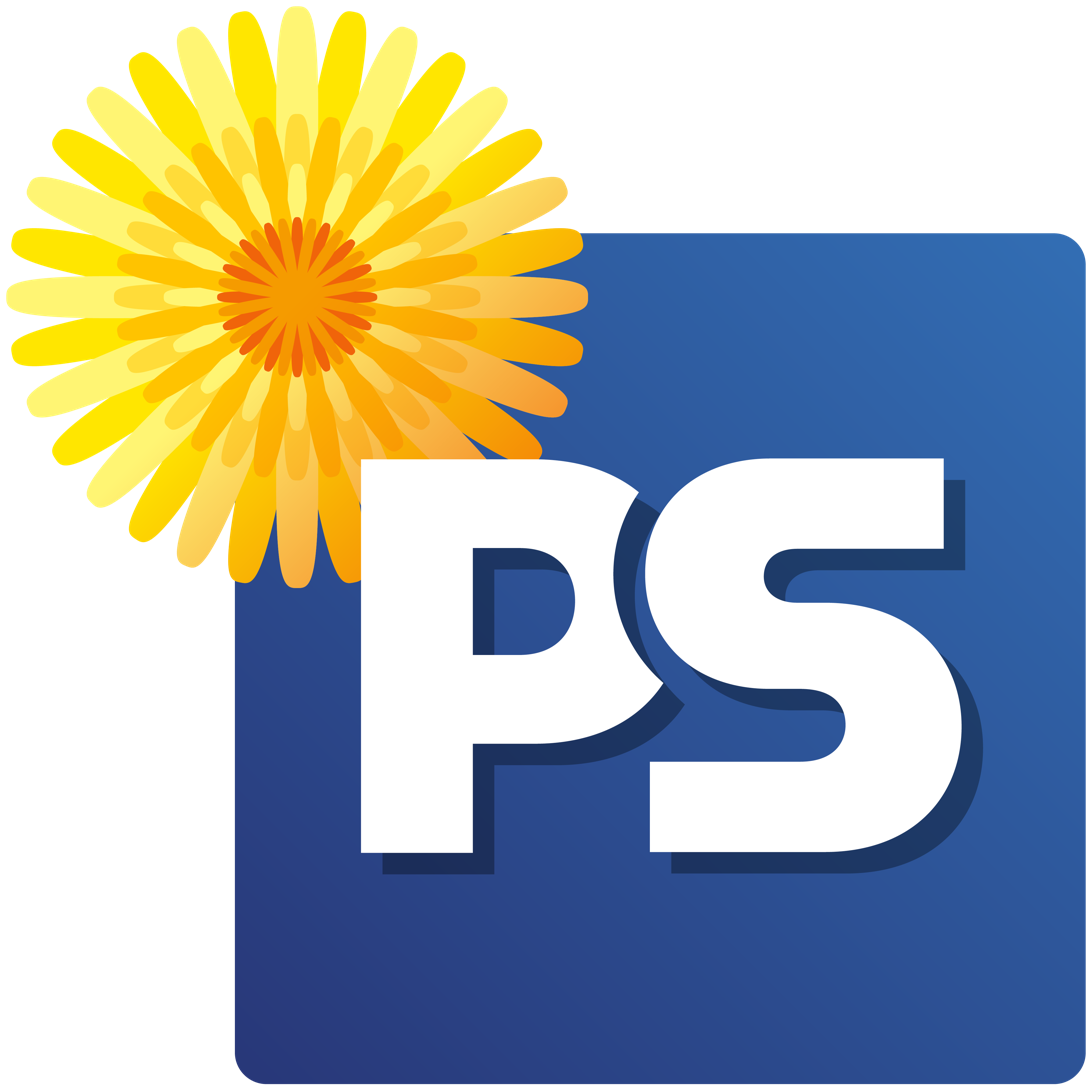
Logo since 2026

=== Leadership ===
==== Party board ====
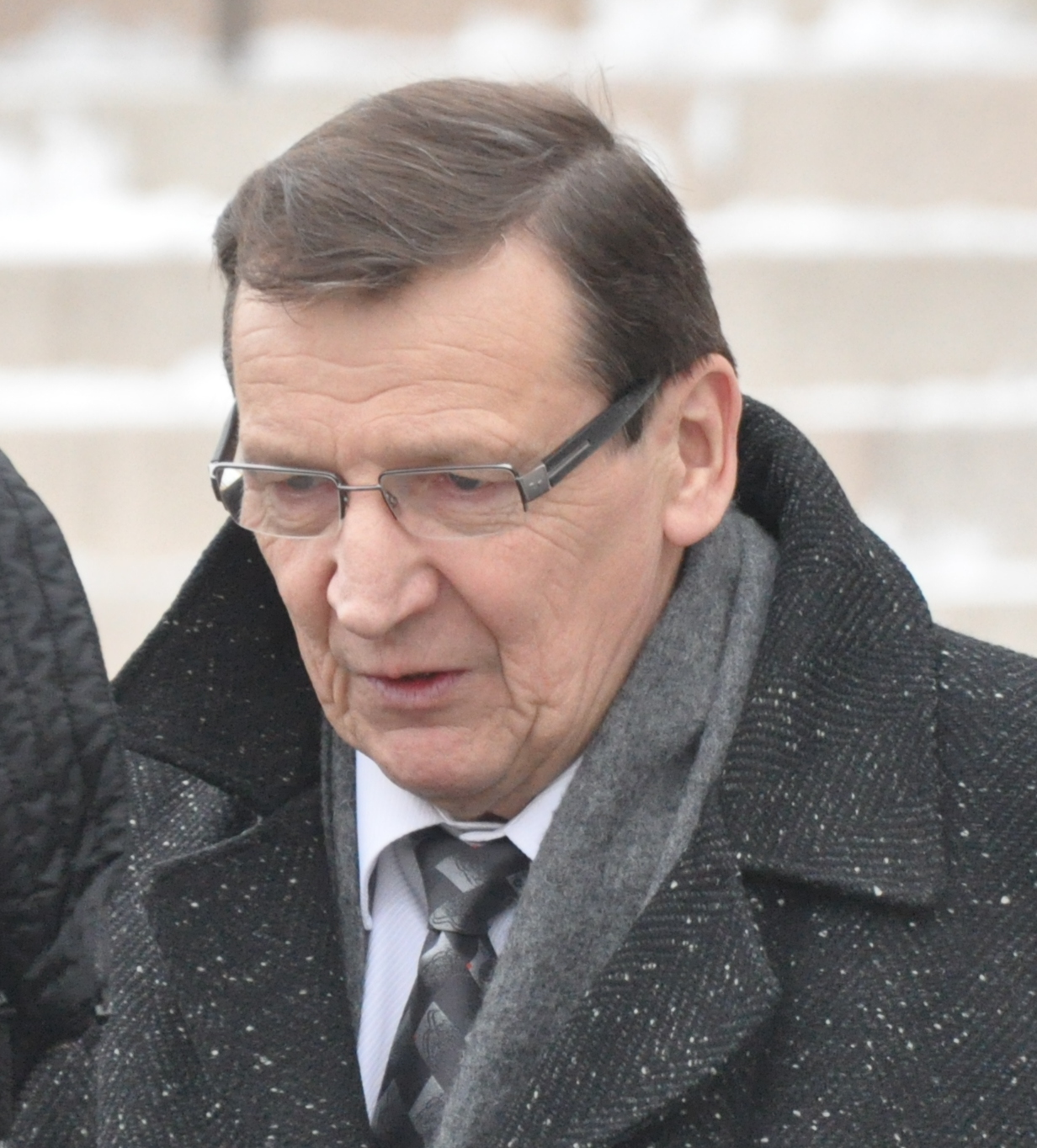
Ex-police commissioner and MP Raimo Vistbacka was elected the first chairperson of the Finns Party in the Kokkola Party Congress in November 1995. Photograph from 2011

The board of the Finns Party has twelve members, the party chairperson, the three deputy chairs, the party secretary, the chair of the parliamentary group and seven other members.

The party chairpersonship is divided between four persons, elected at party congress biannually. Riikka Purra is the party's current chair. The first deputy chair is Teemu Keskisarja, the second deputy chair is Joakim Vigelius and the third deputy chair is Simo Grönroos.

==== Party chairpeople ====
- Raimo Vistbacka (1995–1997)
- Timo Soini (1997–2017)
- Jussi Halla-aho (2017–2021)
- Riikka Purra (2021–)

==== Party secretaries ====
- Timo Soini (1995–1997)
- Rolf Sormo (1997–1999)
- Hannu Purho (1999–2007)
- Ossi Sandvik (2007–2013)
- Riikka Slunga-Poutsalo (2013–2019)
- Simo Grönroos (2019–2021)
- Arto Luukkanen (2021–2025)
- Harri Vuorenpää (2025–)

=== Foundations ===
The foundation, Perussuomalaisten tukisäätiö ("The Finns Party support fund"), was founded in 1990. It used the name SMP:n tukisäätiö until 2006. The fund borrowed 1.7 million euros from the party in 2012 to buy a 450 m^{2} commercial property in downtown Helsinki on Yrjönkatu for use as the party's new headquarters. The party rented these premises from the fund. Following the split in 2017, this foundation was left in the control of the defector group, Blue Reform.

Another foundation, Suomen Perusta ("The Foundation of Finland"), was set up in 2012. Its role is to function as a think tank for the party.

=== Elected representatives ===
==== Current members of the Finnish Parliament ====
Jani Mäkelä is the current chair of the parliamentary group.

- Sanna Antikainen (Savonia-Karelia, 2019–)
- Miko Bergbom (Pirkanmaa, 2023–)
- Juho Eerola (South-East, 2011–)
- Kike Elomaa (Finland Proper, 2011–)
- Kaisa Garedew (Central Finland, 2023–)
- Jussi Halla-aho (Helsinki, 2011–14, 2019–)
- Laura Huhtasaari (Satakunta, 2015–2019, 2023–)
- Petri Huru (Satakunta, 2019–)
- Tomi Immonen (Central Finland, 2023–)
- Vilhelm Junnila (Finland Proper, 2019–)
- Kaisa Juuso (Lapland, 2019–)
- Arja Juvonen (Uusimaa, 2011–)
- Antti Kangas (Oulu, 2023–)
- Teemu Keskisarja (Uusimaa, 2023–)
- Ari Koponen (Uusimaa, 2019–)
- Jari Koskela (Satakunta, 2019–)
- Sheikki Laakso (South-East, 2019–)
- Rami Lehtinen (Häme, 2023–)
- Mikko Lundén (Finland Proper, 2019–)
- Leena Meri (Uusimaa, 2015–)
- Juha Mäenpää (Vaasa, 2019–)
- Jani Mäkelä (South-East, 2015–)
- Veijo Niemi (Pirkanmaa, 2019–)
- Mira Nieminen (Häme, 2023–)
- Mauri Peltokangas (Vaasa, 2019–)
- Jorma Piisinen (Uusimaa, 2023–)
- Mikko Polvinen (Oulu, 2023–)
- Sakari Puisto (Pirkanmaa, 2019–)
- Riikka Purra (Uusimaa, 2019–)
- Lulu Ranne (Häme, 2019–)
- Mari Rantanen (Helsinki, 2019–)
- Minna Reijonen (Savonia-Karelia, 2019–)
- Anne Rintamäki (Vaasa, 2023–)
- Jari Ronkainen (Häme, 2015–)
- Onni Rostila (Uusimaa, 2023–)
- Wille Rydman (Helsinki, 2023–; NCP MP 2015–2023)
- Sami Savio (Pirkanmaa, 2015–)
- Sara Seppänen (Lapland, 2023–)
- Pia Sillanpää (Vaasa, 2023–)
- Jenna Simula (Oulu, 2019–)
- Jaana Strandtman (Southeast Finland, 2023–)
- Ville Tavio (Finland Proper, 2015–)
- Sebastian Tynkkynen (Oulu, 2019–)
- Joakim Vigelius (Pirkanmaa, 2023–)
- Ville Vähämäki (Oulu, 2011–)

==== Former members of the Finnish Parliament ====
- Simon Elo (2015–17; defected to Blue Reform in 2017)
- Tiina Elovaara (2015–17; defected to Blue Reform in 2017)
- Teuvo Hakkarainen (2011–2019)
- Tony Halme (2003–07)
- James Hirvisaari (2011–13; expelled from the party in 2013)
- Reijo Hongisto (2011–17; defected to Blue Reform in 2017)
- Laila Koskela (2011–14; defected to the Centre Party in 2014)
- Lauri Heikkilä (2011–15)
- Olli Immonen (2011–2023)
- Ari Jalonen (2011–17; defected to Blue Reform in 2017)
- Anssi Joutsenlahti (2011–15; Rural MP 1979–87)
- Johanna Jurva (2011–15)
- Pietari Jääskeläinen (2009–15)
- Toimi Kankaanniemi (2015–)
- Pentti Kettunen (2011–15; Rural MP 1983–87, 1989–91)
- Kimmo Kivelä (2011–17; defected to Blue Reform in 2017)
- Osmo Kokko (2011–15)
- Jouni Kotiaho (2019–2023)
- Kari Kulmala (2015–17; defected to Blue Reform in 2017)
- Rami Lehto (2015–2023)
- Jari Lindström (2011–17, Minister for Justice and Employment 2015–19; defected to Blue Reform in 2017)
- Maria Lohela (2011–17, Speaker of the Parliament 2015–2018; defected to Blue Reform in 2017)
- Anne Louhelainen (2011–17; defected to Blue Reform in 2017)
- Pirkko Mattila (2011–17; Minister for Social Affairs and Health 2016–19, defected to Blue Reform in 2017)
- Jukka Mäkynen (2019–2023)
- Lea Mäkipää (2011–17; Rural MP 1983–95; defected to Blue Reform in 2017)
- Hanna Mäntylä (2011–17, Minister for Social Affairs and Health 2015–2016; defected to Blue Reform in 2017)
- Martti Mölsä (2011–17; defected to Blue Reform in 2017)
- Mika Niikko (2011–2023)
- Jussi Niinistö (2011–17, Minister for Defence 2015–19; defected to Blue Reform in 2017)
- Pentti Oinonen (2007–11; defected to Blue Reform in 2017)
- Tom Packalén (2011–2023)
- Mika Raatikainen (2014–19)
- Veera Ruoho (2015–17; defected to the National Coalition Party in 2017)
- Pirkko Ruohonen-Lerner (2007–15)
- Vesa-Matti Saarakkala (2011–17; defected to Blue Reform in 2017)
- Riikka Slunga-Poutsalo (2019–2023)
- Timo Soini (2011–17, 2003–09, Minister for Foreign Affairs 2015–19; defected to Blue Reform in 2017)
- Ismo Soukola (2011–15)
- Sampo Terho (2015–17, Minister for European Affairs, Culture and Sports 2017–19; defected to Blue Reform in 2017)
- Maria Tolppanen (2011–16; defected to the SDP in 2016)
- Reijo Tossavainen (2011–15)
- Ano Turtiainen (2019–20, expelled from the parliamentary group in 2020 and from the party in 2021)
- Kaj Turunen (2011–17; defected to Blue Reform in 2017)
- Kauko Tuupainen (2011–15)
- Markku Uusipaavalniemi (2010–11; Centre MP 2007–10)
- Veikko Vallin (2019–2023)
- Veltto Virtanen (2007–15; Ecological Party MP 1995–99)
- Raimo Vistbacka (1995–11; Rural MP 1987–95)
- Juha Väätäinen (2011–15)
- Jussi Wihonen (2019–2023)
- Timo Vornanen (Savonia-Karelia, 2023–2024; expelled)

==== Members of the European Parliament ====
- Timo Soini (2009–2011)
- Sampo Terho (2011–2015)
- Jussi Halla-aho (2014–2019)
- Laura Huhtasaari (2019–2023)
- Pirkko Ruohonen-Lerner (2015–2019, 2023–2024)
- Teuvo Hakkarainen (2019–2024)
- Sebastian Tynkkynen (2024–)

== Controversies ==
=== 2010s ===
In 2011, Finns party MP James Hirvisaari was fined 1,425 euros by the Kouvola Court of Appeals for comments he made on his blog about Muslims. In 2011, President Tarja Halonen was quoted characterizing some Finns party voters as racist. Her comments were broadly condemned by the Finns party. A 2011 book by Swedish journalist Lisa Bjurwald made a similar characterization. She wrote that the party's leaders support racist positions, while publicly denying that they do so.

In 2011, MP Pentti Oinonen declined an invitation to the presidential Independence Day ball, citing his aversion to seeing same-sex couples dance.

Sitting Finns Party politicians used Nazi posters and officers as profile pictures on their Pietarsaari chapter website in 2014. Local councillor Sari Karlström commented that it was "ironic".

Jussi Halla-aho, the previous leader of the party, a former MEP and now the Speaker of the House wrote that Somalis were genetically predisposed to rob passersby, wrote that he would be happy if a gang of immigrants raped a Green League MP, and commented "Violence is an underrated problem-solving tool these days," while pondering if he should shoot a gay man. A number of senior Finns Party politicians, including Halla-aho and Immonen, are also Suomen Sisu members, an organization that Länsiväylä describes as a Nazi group. The website of Suomen Sisu has promoted books by Nazis and neo-Nazis such as Alfred Rosenberg, George Lincoln Rockwell and David Duke.

There have also been Finns Party candidates who are members of Blood & Honour. Finns Party councillor Risto Helin was photographed wearing a Blood & Honour shirt and he donated Adolf Hitler paraphernalia to an affiliated skinhead club in Vaasa.

In a judgement given on 8 June 2012 MP, Jussi Halla-aho, then Chairperson of the Administration Committee, was found guilty by the Supreme Court of Finland of disturbing religious worship and ethnic agitation for statements he made about Muhammad in his blog.

In October 2013, it was reported that MP James Hirvisaari, had invited far-right activist Seppo Lehto as his guest to the parliament. During his visit, Lehto made several Nazi salutes, including at least one instance where Hirvisaari took a photo of Lehto performing the Nazi salute from the spectator gallery overlooking the Parliament House's Session Hall. Photos and videos of Lehto performing the Nazi salute in the Parliament House were then distributed on Lehto's public Facebook page and on YouTube. After newspapers broke news of the incident, Speaker of the Parliament Eero Heinäluoma issued a notice of censure to Hirvisaari for the incident and the Finns Party leadership unanimously decided to expel Hirvisaari from the party, citing multiple cases of acting against the party's interest.

Hirvisaari then became affiliated with the Change 2011 party as the party's MP, until he was unseated in the parliamentary election of 2015.

The party's Ruovesi municipal chapter's official postal address had Nazi flags hanging in the windows in 2019. The chapter chairperson denied that the flags were his.

=== 2020s ===
Between 2019–2022, Finns party MP Vilhelm Junnila made four budgetary motions in order to support Veljesapu-Perinneyhdistys, a Finnish organization that cherishes the heritage of the Finnish volunteers in the Waffen-SS. Junnila wrote in his motion, that the support would be, "for the promotion of balanced historical research". In 2020, a number of Finns Party MPs criticised the Research Council of Finland for funding research on the Holocaust by historian and Green League candidate Oula Silvennoinen at the University of Helsinki. According to Der Spiegel, three Finns Party ministers in the Orpo cabinet supported a motion to provide funding for an SS veterans association as a "counter-study", in response to accusations of Finnish SS men having participated in the Holocaust.

Finns Party politicians have frequently supported anti-Muslim movements such as the Finnish Defense League, Soldiers of Odin, Nordic Resistance Movement (NRM), Rajat Kiinni (Close the Borders), and Suomi Ensin (Finland First). An anti-mosque demonstration was supported by the youth branch of the PS, whose chair, Jarmo Keto, said that, "Islam as an ideology is responsible for many conflicts and terror attacks. Thus such a mosque project is an irresponsible idea".

Members of the Finns Party have attracted criticism from the other parties and antifascists for attending events organized by or with the NRM. Two municipal-level politicians of the Finns Party have taken part in an event where the participants shot and threw knives at shooting targets, using photos of members of the Rinne Cabinet.

The Finns Party's parliamentary group's general secretary, Olli Immonen, attended an NRM event commemorating Eugen Schauman, who assassinated Nikolay Bobrikov. Some members of the party have been fired from as a result of contacts with the far-right. Immonen has also multiple times shared a blog criticizing the "Holocaust-religion".

In 2020, the party sacked the youth wing's vice leader Toni Jalonen for declaring himself a fascist at a conference in Estonia. The party additionally cut financial support to its youth wing, so it was declared bankrupt as a result. A new organization called Perussuomalainen nuoriso in Finnish was founded with new personnel to replace it.

NRM and other far-right activists attend an annual torch march demonstration in Helsinki on the Finnish independence day which ends at the Hietaniemi cemetery where members visit the tomb of Carl Gustaf Emil Mannerheim and the monument to the Finnish Volunteer Battalion of the Waffen-SS. According to B'nai B'rith's report, "The main organizers and guests of the event have been drawn from either non-party-affiliated far-right activists or members of the right-wing populist Finns Party (Perussuomalaiset), or its youth organization Finns Party Youth (Perussuomalaiset Nuoret)".

Finns Party MP Vilhelm Junnila spoke at an event organized in memory of victims of a terrorist attack in 2019. His participation in the event was criticised in the media due to the event being organized by the NRM and Soldiers of Odin. Junnila had also previously used the 14/88 as his campaign slogan, "Vote on the 14th, 88." The matter was especially brought up in the media after the formation of the Orpo Cabinet in 2023, where he was appointed Minister of Economic Affairs. Junnila survived a vote of no-confidence, but announced his resignation from the cabinet afterwards. He was replaced by Wille Rydman, who gained attention for his multiple nazi-related controversies after his appointment, such as describing himself as a Nazi.

Viljam Nyman, a Finns Party Lapland area board member became a leader of the Atomwaffen Division's Finnish chapter and a prominent adherent to the satanic Order of Nine Angles (ONA). Nyman's associate, a Finns party member born in 1980 and a fellow accelerationism and ONA adherent had dozens of his writings published by the official Finns party organ, Suomen Uutiset. Both were suspected of planning murders and terrorist attacks, and Nyman has been subsequently convicted of terror offenses. The person born in 1980 is also suspected of sending a string of letter bombs to the Social Democratic, Green League and Left Alliance parties' offices.

A member of the Finns Party in the Espoo city council from 2021 to 2025, Jiri Keronen, told the media that he "avows" the teachings of ONA, and that he is republishing its works.

On 9 May 2024, the Finns Party council expelled Timo Vornanen alongside Teuvo Hakkarainen from the party, because of the police suspecting that Timo Vornanen pointed at a group of people with a gun and then shot the ground after an argument on the 26 April in the Kamppi subdivision of Helsinki, outside a bar. After the shooting incident, Vornanen has been on sick leave from the parliament.

He announced on May 14 that he'd give up his parliamentary committee seats to the rest of the Finns Party to decide on replacements. He also posted on Facebook that he would leave the Joensuu city council's Finns Party council group and create his own city council and parliamentary groups.

Former MEP Teuvo Hakkarainen, on the other hand, was expelled from the party because he stood as a candidate for the European Parliament on the Freedom Alliance's list. He claims that he did this because the Finns Party's leadership had "left the field" and adopted a mentality of kicking people out if they even slightly questioned the party's leadership or criticised their actions.

Members of the party, Juho Eerola and Kaisa Garedew, posted images containing derogatory gestures against Asian people in December 2025, after Miss Finland winner Sarah Dzafce posted an image on Instagram pulling the corners of her eyes with the caption, "eating with a Chinese person".
