= Vesa-Matti Saarakkala =

Finnish politician

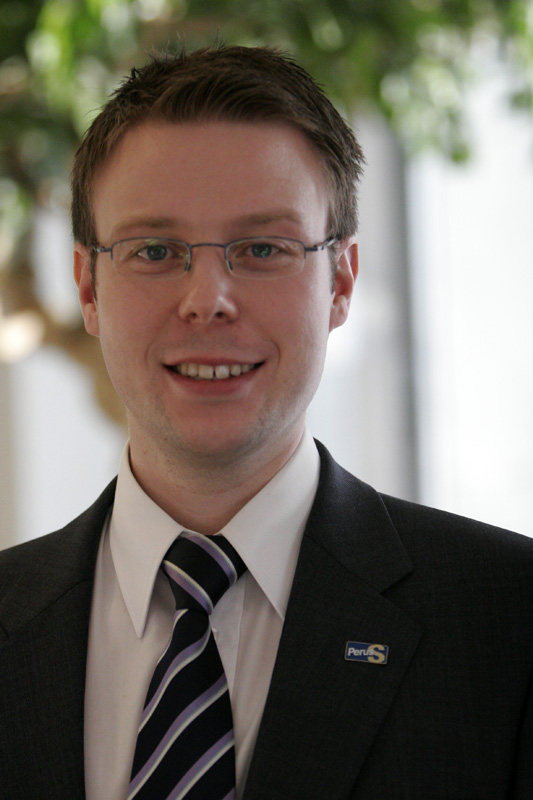

Member of Finnish Parliament for Vaasa
- In office 20 April 2011 – 2019

Personal details
- Born: 24 March 1984 (age 42)
- Party: Blue Reform (2017–); Finns Party (until 2017)
- Occupation: Politician
- Website: Saarakkala's Official Website

Vesa-Matti Saarakkala (born 24 March 1984) was a Finnish Member of Parliament from 2011 to 2019 and a member of Kurikka's city council.

== Early life ==
Saarakkala was born on 24 March 1984 in Kurikka, Finland. His father was an office manager and his mother worked various jobs before becoming a practical nurse. He has one sister who is older than him by thirteen years.

== Political career ==
Saarakkala represents the Finns Party and is the 3rd vice-chairman of the party. He was elected chairman of the youth organization for the party in autumn 2003, and he held the position until 2010. He was elected 17 April 2011 to the Parliament of Finland from the Vaasa electoral district.

On 13 June 2017, Saarakkala and 19 others left the Finns Party parliamentary group to found the New Alternative parliamentary group. In September 2018, Saarakkala announced that he wouldn't run for the Parliament anymore in the 2019 elections.

=== Nuiva manifesti ===
Saarakkala was one of the underwriters of the "Nuiva Manifesti" ("The sour electoral manifesto"), an election campaign program critical of current immigration policy. The other signers were Juho S. A. Eerola, Jussi Halla-aho, James Hirvisaari, Olli Immonen, Teemu Lahtinen, Maria Lohela, Heikki Luoto, Heta Lähteenaro, Johannes Nieminen, Pasi Salonen, Riikka Slunga-Poutsalo and Freddy Van Wonterghem.

=== Circumcision ban proposal ===
In March 2012, Saarakkala called for the criminalisation of male circumcision in Finland. In October 2012, it was reported that he had plans to submit a bill proposing the criminalisation of ritual circumcision involving males under the age of 15.

== Personal life ==
Saarakkala is married to a classroom teacher. He and his wife have two children together: a daughter named Lilja (born 2009) and a daughter named Sonja (born 2012).
