= Luukkanen =

Luukkanen is a Finnish surname. Notable people with the surname include:

- Eino Luukkanen (1909–1964), Finnish World War II fighter ace
- Arto Luukkanen (born 1964), Finnish historian and social scientist
- Johannes Luukkanen (born 1999), Finnish professional footballer
