= Suojelusenkeli =

Suojelusenkeli may refer to:

- Suojelusenkeli, a 2014 novel by Finnish historian Arto Luukkanen
- Suojelusenkeli (film), a 2018 Finnish psychological thriller

== Music ==
- "Suojelusenkeli", a 19th-century Finnish song with lyrics by Immi Hellén
- "Suojelusenkeli", a 1999 song by Finnish rock band Don Huonot
- Suojelusenkeli – Joulun klassikot 2, a 2014 album by Finnish musician Jarkko Ahola
