= Harri Vuorenpää =

Finnish politician (born 1982)

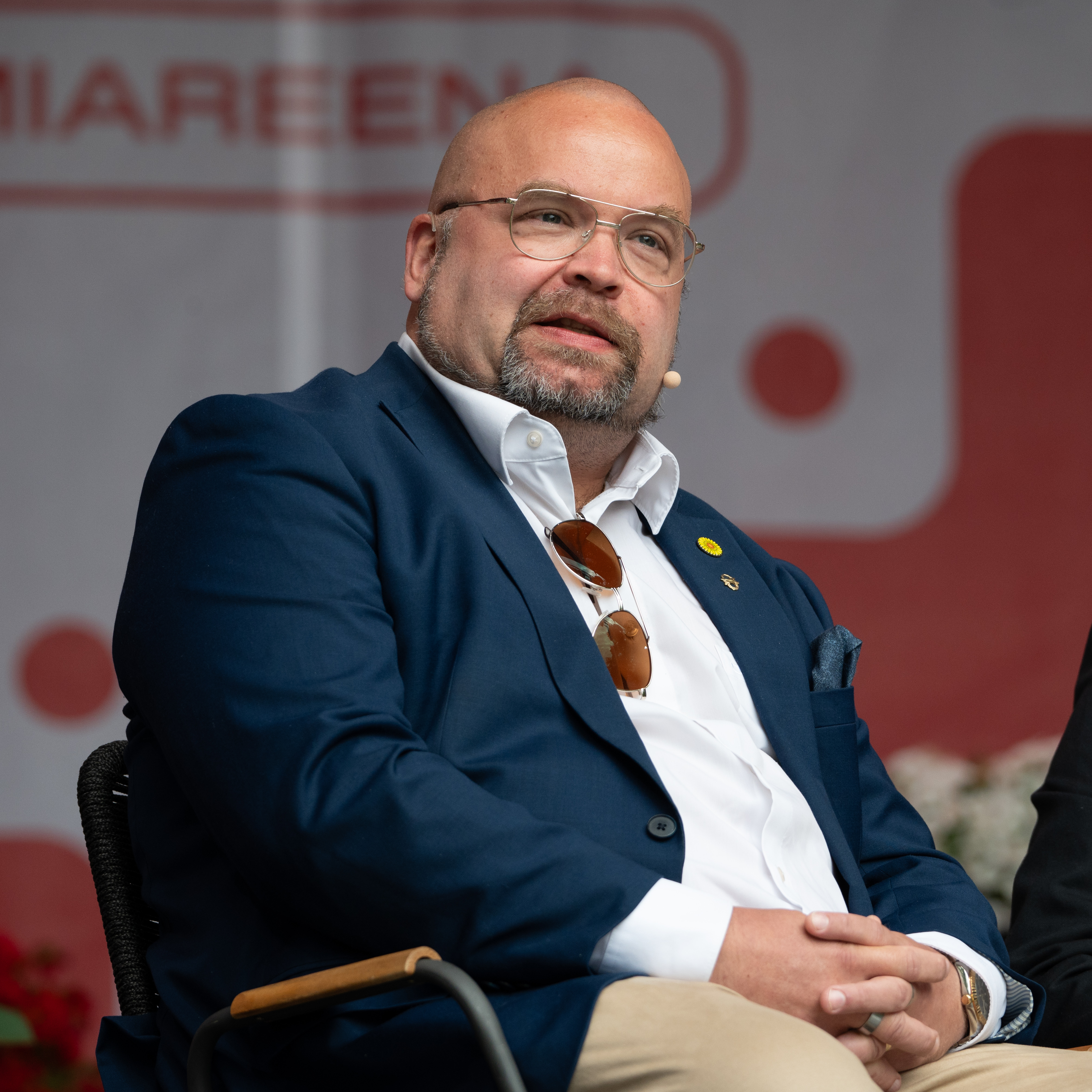
Vuorenpää in 2026.

Harri Tapio Vuorenpää (born 20 September 1982 in Tampere, Pirkanmaa) is a Finnish politician and the Party Secretary of the Finns Party since August 2023.

Vuorenpää is a business economist by education and an accounting firm entrepreneur by profession. He has a Master's degree in entrepreneurship and business from 2014 from the Tampere University of Applied Sciences. He serves as the First Vice Chairman of the Pirkkala Municipal Council and heads the Finns Party council group. He has previously served as the chairman of the Finns Party in Pirkanmaa and on the party board. Vuorenpää was elected to the position of Party Secretary at the party's summer 2023 party conference, receiving the most votes cast in both rounds of the election. He was re-elected in the summer of 2025, defeating Arto Luukkanen.
