= James Hirvisaari =

Finnish politician

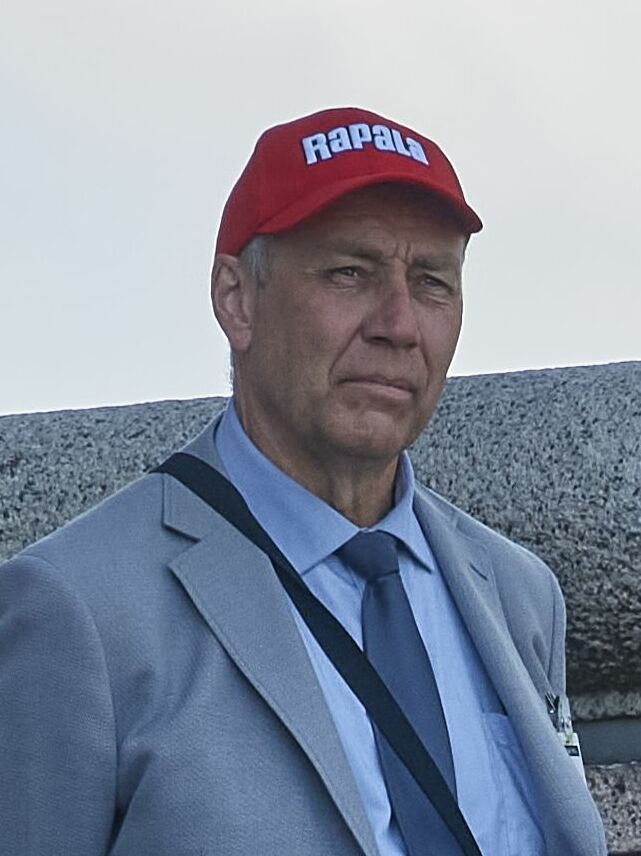

Member of the Finnish Parliament for Tavastia
- In office 20 April 2011 – 21 April 2015

Personal details
- Born: 2 July 1960 (age 66)
- Party: VKK (2020-), Reform (2018-2020), Change 2011 October 2013-2018; The Finns Party Until October 2013
- Education: University of Helsinki (M.Th.)
- Occupation: Train driver
- Website: http://james.hirvisaari.info/vaalit

James Hirvisaari (born 2 July 1960) is a Finnish politician. He was elected to the Finnish Parliament in the 2011 general election held on 17 April on the electoral list of the Finns Party, but since 2013 he has represented Change 2011.

== Personal background ==
Hirvisaari is a former train driver, educated at the Helsinki Pasila engine drivers' school in 1980–1982. He was admitted to University of Helsinki in 1999 to study theology, and reportedly graduated in 2020 with a master's degree in theology. Hirvisaari undertook his military national service in the Kymi Anti-Aircraft Battalion in 1979–1980 in Kouvola.

== Politics ==
During his 2011 election campaign Hirvisaari was critical of the immigration policies in Finland ("Maahanmuutto hallintaan! – Immigration under control!), and supported national sovereignty ("Riittää, että kansalaiset ovat sitä mieltä – muita perusteluja ei tarvita." – "It is enough that the citizens are of that opinion – no other arguments are needed.") as well as Finland generally as a country ("Suomen kieli – Suomen mieli – Suomen luonto – Suomen lippu" – "Finnish language – Finnish mindset – Finnish nature – Finnish flag"). In July 2011 Hirvisaari stated that the killings in Oslo on 22 July 2011, by right-wing extremist Anders Behring Breivik, were a side-effect of Norway's immigration policies.

Just before the 2011 general election Hirvisaari was prosecuted for his blog in the Uusi Suomi newspaper web site under the title "Kikkarapäälle kuonoon". The text referenced an attack on a foreign person in Helsinki — Hirvisaari wrote that the crime had not necessarily been a racist one. In November 2010 the district court of Päijät-Häme dropped the charges against him of incitement. After consultation with the deputy general attorney, Jorma Kalske, the state appealed against the verdict. In December the Kouvola court of appeals found Hirvisaari guilty of incitement and fined him.

In October 2013, Speaker of the Parliament Eero Heinäluoma issued a notice of censure to Hirvisaari for an incident where he had invited far-right activist Seppo Lehto as his guest to the parliament. During his visit, Lehto made several Nazi salutes, including at least one instance where Hirvisaari took a photo of Lehto performing the Nazi salute from the spectator gallery overlooking the Parliament House's Session Hall. Photos and videos of Lehto performing the Nazi salute in the Parliament House were then distributed on Lehto's public Facebook page and on YouTube. The Finns Party leadership then unanimously decided to expel Hirvisaari from the party, citing multiple cases of acting against the party's interest. After his expulsion from the Finns Party Hirvisaari joined Change 2011, becoming that party's first MP.

In the 2015 parliamentary elections Hirvisaari was a candidate for the Muutos 2011 party on the Uusimaa electoral district, but did not gather enough votes to be elected.

== Suomen Sisu ==
The board of the Finnish nationalist association Suomen Sisu congratulated Hirvisaari for his election to the Finnish parliament and referred to him as "one of its members". In 2013 Hirvisaari resigned his membership in Suomen Sisu, but he rejoined the organisation in 2014.

== Nuiva manifesti ==
James Hirvisaari was one of the authors of the so-called "Nuiva Manifesti" ("The sour electoral manifesto"), an election campaign programme critical of current Finnish immigration policy. The other authors were Finns Party politicians Juho Eerola, Jussi Halla-Aho, Olli Immonen, Teemu Lahtinen, Maria Lohela, Heikki Luoto, Heta Lähteenaro, Johannes Nieminen, Vesa-Matti Saarakkala, Pasi Salonen, Riikka Slunga-Poutsalo and Freddy Van Wonterghem.
