= Sebastian Tynkkynen =

Finnish politician

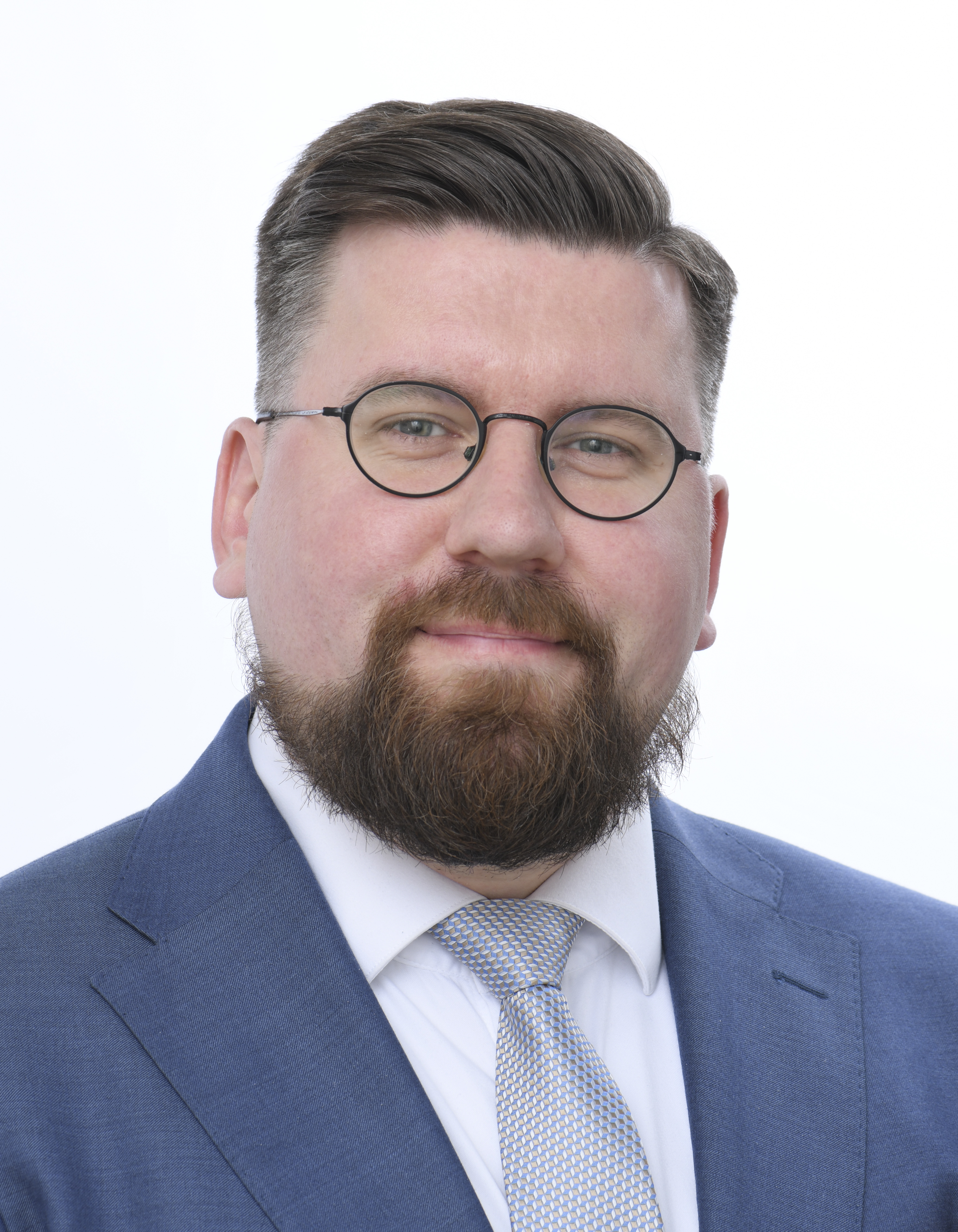
- Tynkkynen in 2024

Member of the European Parliament for Finland
- Incumbent
- Assumed office 16 July 2024

Member of Parliament for Oulu
- In office 17 April 2019 – 15 July 2024

Personal details
- Born: 8 March 1989 (age 37) Lohtaja, Finland
- Party: Finns Party (2012–present)
- Domestic partner: Alan da Silva

Miika Sebastian Tynkkynen (born 8 March 1989) is a Finnish politician. He has been chairman of the Finns Party Youth and third vice chairman of the Finns Party. He was elected as a member of Finnish Parliament in April 2019 and was a candidate as Member of European Parliament for the 2019 elections.

== Early life ==
Tynkkynen was raised in Oulu. In 2011 he participated in the reality television show Big Brother. He studied to become a classroom teacher (M. Ed.) in the University of Oulu, but didn't finish his studies.

== Political career ==
In 2012, Tynkkynen joined the Finns Party and ran for the City Council of Oulu, receiving 232 votes but was not elected. In November 2014 Tynkkynen was elected chairman of the Finns Party Youth. He received 1,474 votes in the 2015 parliamentary election and was not elected to the Parliament. However, Tynkkynen was elected third vice chairman of the Finns Party on 8 August 2015, defeating incumbent Juho Eerola.

Tynkkynen criticized the Finns Party leadership for its politics in the Sipilä Cabinet, calling for more euroskeptic and anti-immigration politics. In October 2015 he was expelled from the party. The official reason for this was that he had published a list of names of party members who called for a new party congress. His expulsion was considered illegal by some experts. In January 2016 Tynkkynen was allowed to rejoin the party although he had to give up his position as the vice chairman.

On 20 November 2016 Tynkkynen was succeeded by Samuli Voutila as the chairman of the Finns Party Youth. In late 2018 Tynkkynen tried to regain the Finns Party Youth chairman seat but he got fewer votes than the other candidate Asseri Kinnunen.

In January 2017, Tynkkynen was fined 300 euros for posting on Facebook, "The fewer Muslims in Finland, the better. [...] The less we see of Muslims, it is safer. We have to get rid of Islam before it is too late". In April 2017 Tynkkynen was elected to the City Council of Oulu with 680 votes.

In October 2019 Tynkkynen was convicted of ethnic agitation for the second time and issued a 50 day-fine (approximately 4000 euros based on his income) for comments on Muslims.

From Friday 14 May to Saturday 15 May 2021, Tynkkynen gave the longest ever floor speech at the Parliament of Finland in the entire history of the parliament, lasting almost eight and a half hours from 6:06 PM on Friday to 2:30 AM on Saturday. He argued against the approval of the EU's stimulus package in the speech that was seen as a filibuster to delay the parliament's vote on the matter.

In October 2021, Tynkkynen was convicted for a third time for inciting ethnic agitation, being issued a 70 day-fine (approximately 4400 euros).

In years 2021, 2023 and 2025, he gained, retained and lost respectively the position of third vice chairman of the Finns party.

In 2025, Miss Finland Sarah Dzafce was stripped of her crown after making a gesture widely condemned as an act of anti-Asian racism. Following the incident, Tynkkynen was seen performing a slant-eye gesture on Facebook, a gesture also posted by two Finns Party MPs. The controversy drew international attention, making Finland notable for cases in which even political figures were associated with such behavior.

== Personal life ==
He was born in Lohtaja. Since the age of fifteen, Tynkkynen has described himself as bisexual. Later he has described himself as homosexual. He is currently in a relationship with a man from Mozambique. Since childhood he had been a Pentecostal, but he was excommunicated in 2018, because he sees same-sex marriage as backed by the Bible. The Pentecostal Church does not hold this viewpoint and believes that Tynkkynen had strayed from the Pentecostal view of marriage. Tynkkynen claims that the reason for him being asked to leave the Church was that he was in a relationship with a man.
