= Riikka Slunga-Poutsalo =

Finnish politician

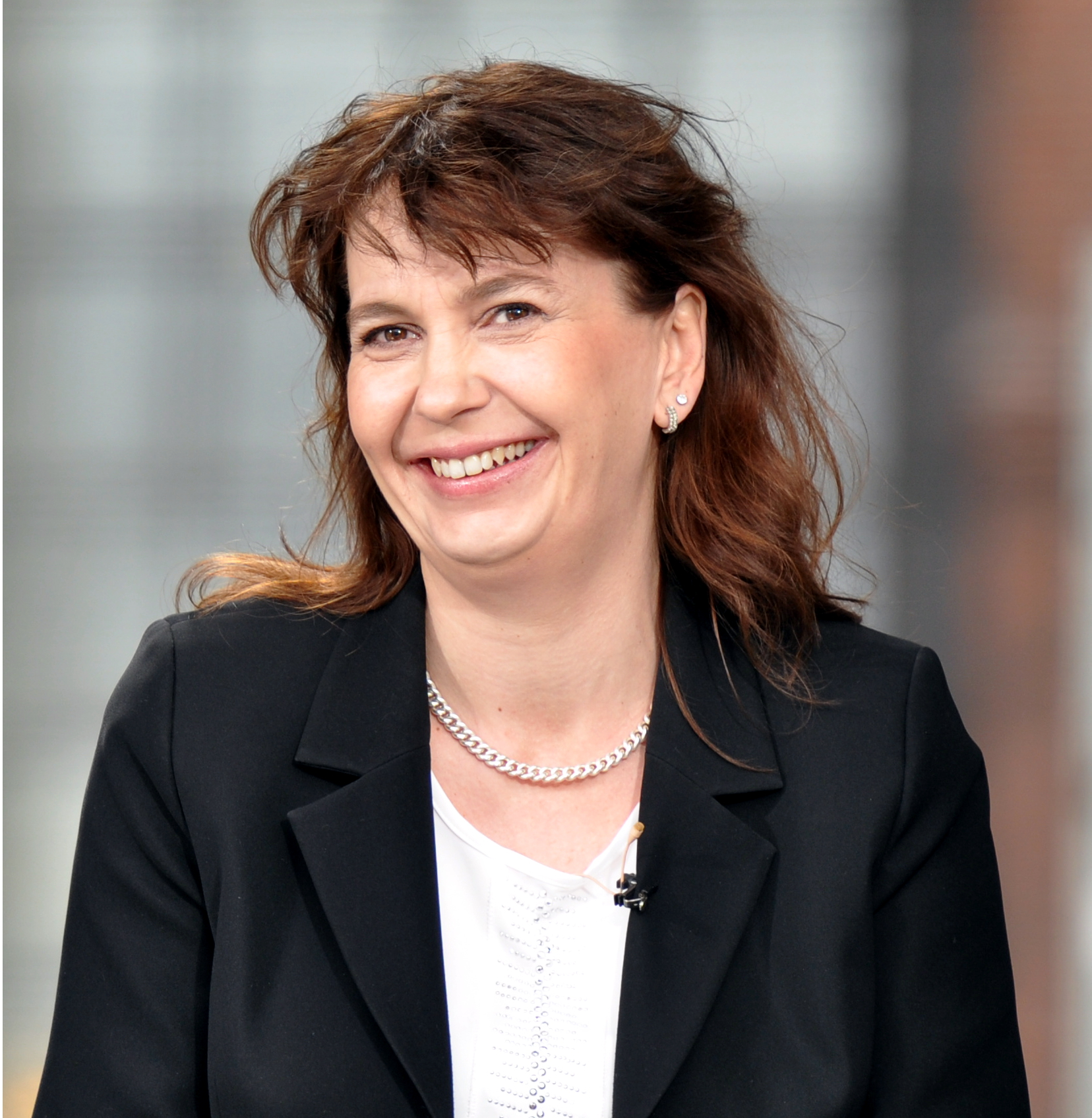

Member of the Finnish Parliament for Uusimaa
- In office 17 April 2019 – 04 April 2023

Personal details
- Born: 23 April 1971 (age 54) Alatornio, Lapland, Finland
- Party: Finns Party

Riikka Pirjo Maaria Slunga-Poutsalo (born 23 April 1971 in Alatornio) is a Finnish politician currently serving as State Secretary to Minister of Finance Riikka Purra. A member of the Finns Party, she has previously served as a member of parliament from 2019 to 2023, representing the Uusimaa constituency.
