= Suomen Sisu =

Finnish political association

- Formation: 1998, reformation 2000
- Headquarters: Helsinki
- Chairman: Kristian Viding
- Vice-Chairman: Riku Nevanpää
- Vice-Chairman: Teemu Lahtinen
- Website: suomensisu.fi

Suomen Sisu (Translated: Finnish Sisu) is a nonpartisan Finnish association that defines itself as nationalist and patriotic, criticizing unlimited immigration and multiculturalism. Suomen Sisu proclaims to support the idea of independent nation states, that govern themselves sovereignly, and opposes supranational co-operation, especially the European Union. Suomen Sisu was established as the Youth Organisation of the Association of Finnish Culture and Identity (Suomalaisuuden Liitto) in 1998, but this affiliation was broken in 2000. The organization is not affiliated with any political party, but its members have operated in several parties as individuals, particularly within the Finns Party.

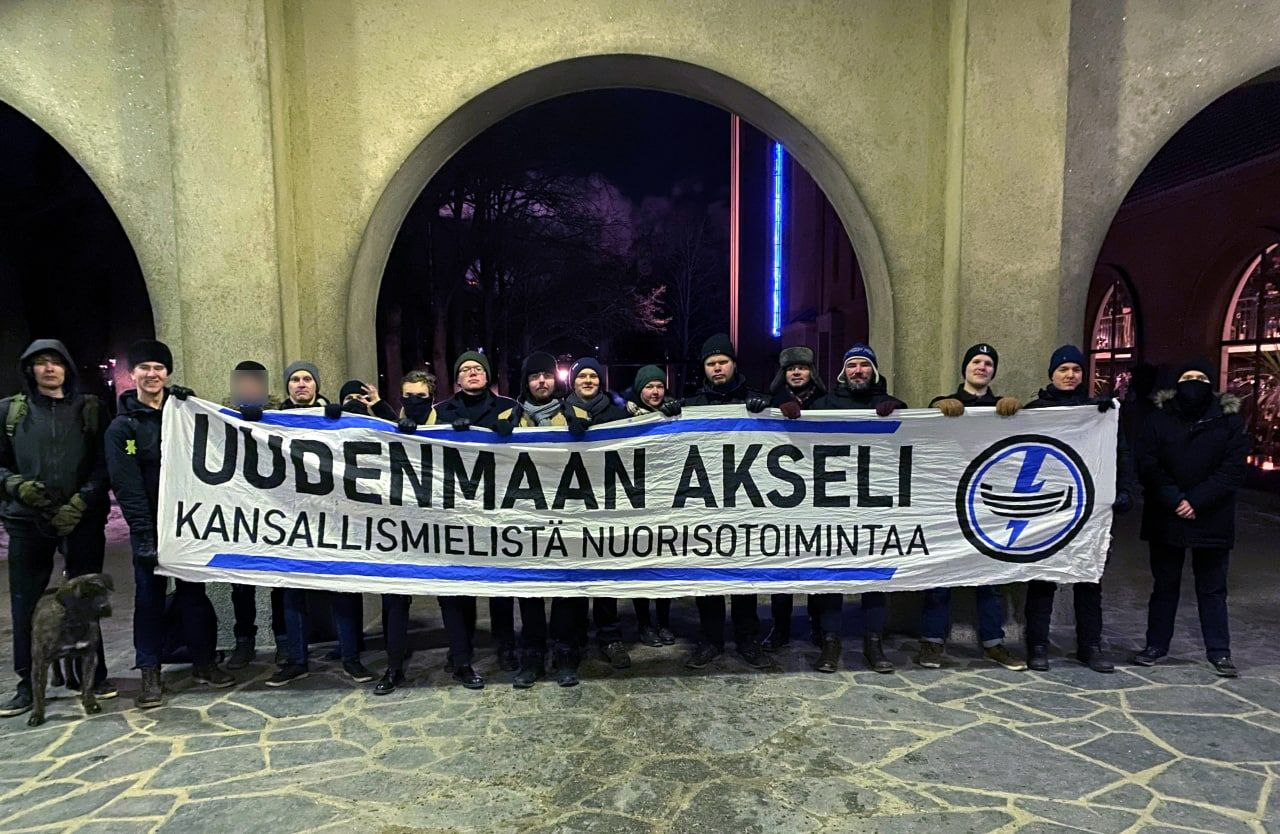
Uusimaa chapter of the National Axis with the Flash and circle symbol

The association gained publicity in the spring of 2006 when it published the Muhammad-cartoons on its web site. Member of Parliament Jari Vilén asked the police to investigate the issue, but it did not lead to prosecution. Finnish Prime Minister Matti Vanhanen publicly apologised for the publication of the cartoons, which was interpreted by Suomen Sisu as "flattering the islamists".

Suomen Sisu was described as a "Nazi spirited" group by the Finnish newspaper Länsiväylä; the association's president deemed the description incorrect and filed a complaint with the Council for Mass Media in Finland. The Council ruled that as the Länsiväylä had given the president of the association an opportunity to publish his own letter regarding the issue in the Länsiväylä, the Council saw no need for further action. Some of the founders of Suomen Sisu were members of a group called "Thule Society" and the pro-Apartheid "Friends of South Africa" organization. The website of Suomen Sisu has promoted books by Nazis and neo-Nazis such as Alfred Rosenberg, George Lincoln Rockwell and David Duke. Members of Suomen Sisu have given statements understood as condoning fascism such as Juho Eerola saying "a lot can be learned" from Mussolini. According to political scientist and radical right researcher Ann-Cathrine Jungar, Suomen Sisu is part of the "European neo-fascist milieux".

Suomen Sisu congratulated its members Jussi Halla-aho, Olli Immonen, James Hirvisaari and Juho Eerola for having been elected as the members of the parliament of Finland, 17 April 2011 in general elections. In 2019, Jussi Halla-aho left Suomen Sisu. Current and former Members of Suomen Sisu have risen to prominent positions: Jussi Halla-aho is Speaker of the Parliament and Olli Immonen is the General Secretary of the Finns Party. Previous General Secretary of the Finns, Simo Grönroos, was member of Suomen Sisu as well.

Finns Party Youths who wanted a more explicitly fascist and ethnonationalist youth organization formed the Uusimaa Axis (Uudenmaan Akseli) in 2020 that became the officially sanctioned youth organization of the Suomen Sisu. Uusimaa Axis was renamed into National Axis (Kansallinen Akseli) as multiple chapters were founded across the country.
