= Arja Juvonen =

Finnish politician

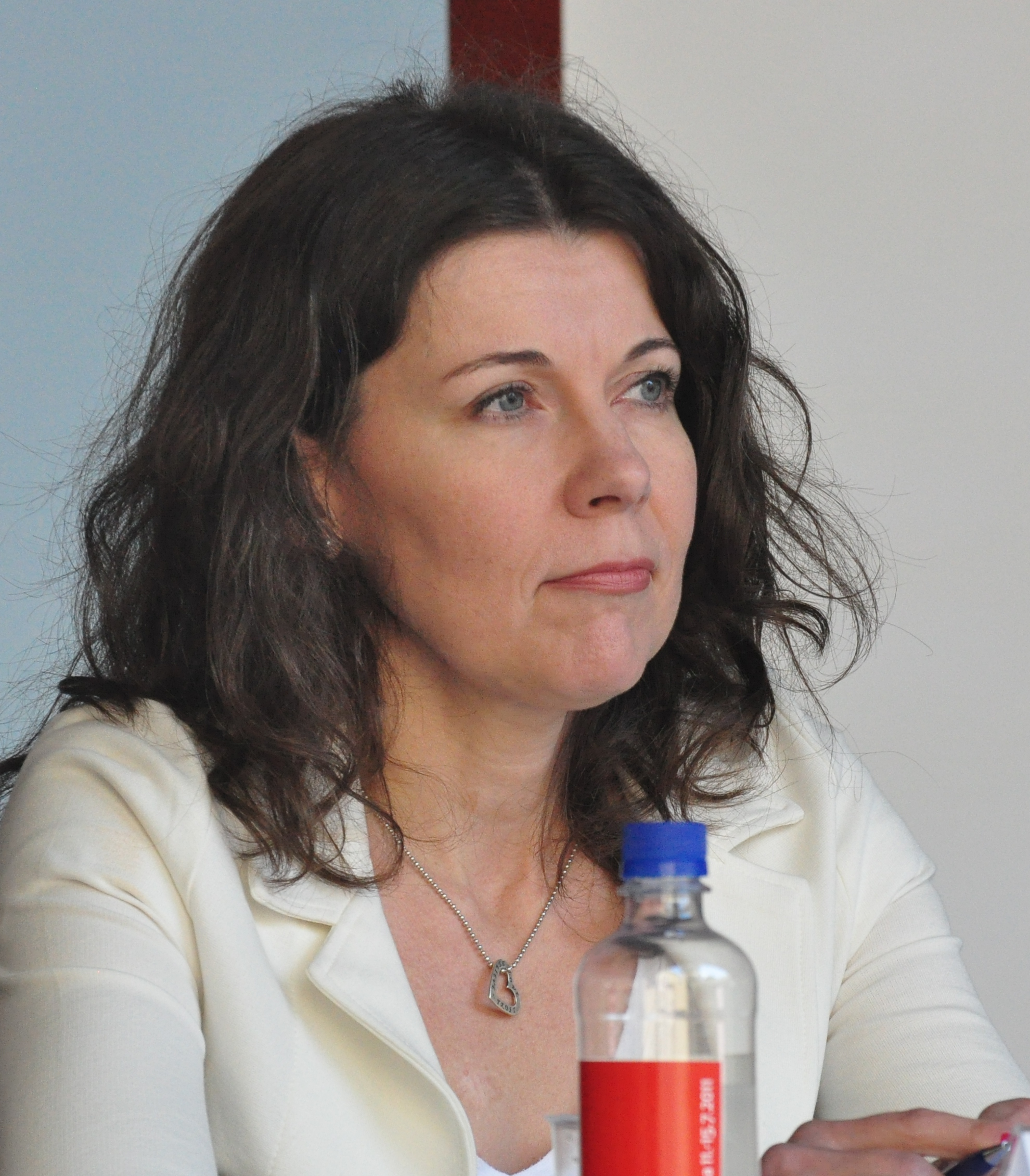

Member of the Finnish Parliament
- Incumbent
- Assumed office 20 April 2011
- Constituency: Uusimaa

Personal details
- Born: 8 December 1967 (age 58) Kuopio mlk, Northern Savonia, Finland
- Party: Finns Party

Arja Sinikka Juvonen (born 8 December 1967) is a Finnish politician who represents the conservative Finns Party in the Parliament of Finland.

== Career ==
Juvonen served in the city council of Espoo since 2009 and in 2011 was elected to represent the Uusimaa constituency in the Parliament of Finland.

In 2017, Juvonen left the Finns Party due to the election of the Jussi Halla-aho as the leader of the party. However, she did not join the Blue Reform party, which was formed by the MPs that had left the Finns Party. Instead, after a few weeks, Juvonen re-joined the Finns Party.

In May 2020, Juvonen publicly criticized the government's response to the COVID-19 pandemic in Finland, arguing that the government was not prepared to response to the pandemic.
