= 2012 Finnish municipal elections =

Municipal elections were held in Finland on 28 October 2012, with advance voting between 17 and 23 October 2012. 9,674 municipal council seats were open for election in 304 municipalities. The number of councillors decreased by over 700 compared to the previous election due to the merging of several municipalities. The term of the elected councillors will begin on 1 January 2013.

== Funds ==
In Finland, candidates have to declare their campaign funding. 15% of the declarations did not arrive in time.

== Competing parties ==
- Centre Party
- National Coalition Party (NCP)
- Social Democratic Party (SDP)
- True Finns
- Green League
- Left Alliance
- Swedish People's Party (SPP)
- Christian Democrats
- Pirate Party
- Communist Party
- Change 2011
- Independence Party
- Workers Party
- Communist Workers' Party – For Peace and Socialism
- For the Poor
- Freedom Party

== Electoral method ==
The D'Hondt method is used in the election. The size of the municipal council or city council depends on the population of the municipality:

Population	Number of councilmen
under 2,000	13, 15 or 17
2,001–4,000	21
4,001–8,000	27
8,001–15,000	35
15,001–30,000	43
30,001–60,000	51
60,001–120,000	59
120,001–250,000	67
250,001–400,000	75
over 400,000	85

Helsinki is the only city in the last category and Espoo the only city in the second-to-last category.

== National results ==
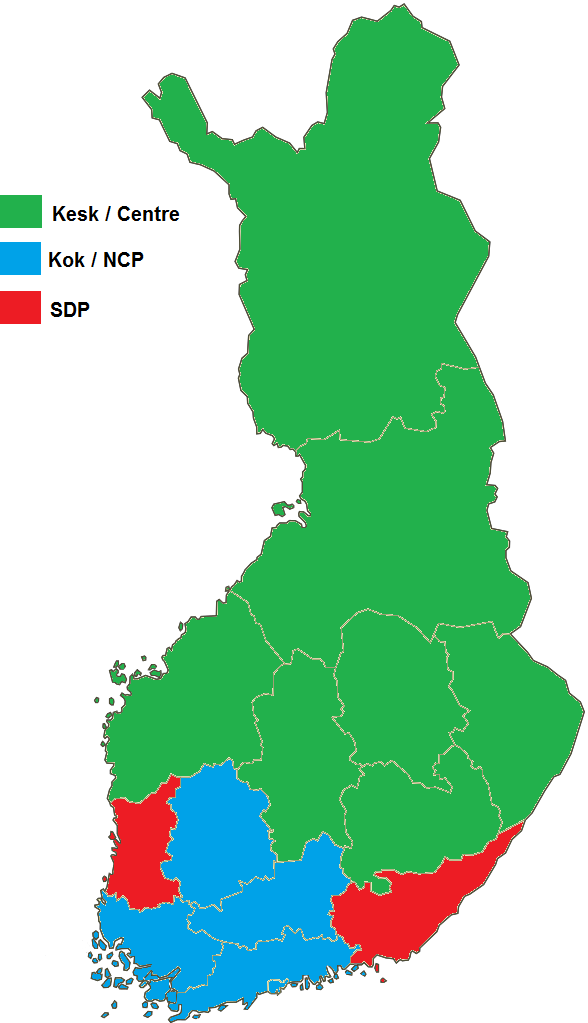
Largest party by constituency: National Coalition Party Centre Party Social Democratic Party

Party	Votes				Council seats	
Party	Number	%	Swing (2008)	Swing (2011)	Number	Net ±
National Coalition	545,889	21.9%	−1.6pp	+1.5pp	1,735	−286
SDP	487,924	19.6%	−1.7pp	+0.5pp	1,729	−337
Centre	465,166	18.7%	−1.4pp	+2.9pp	3,077	−440
Finns	307,797	12.3%	+7.0pp	−6.7pp	1,195	+752
Green	213,100	8.5%	−0.4pp	+1.3pp	323	−47
Left Alliance	199,615	8.0%	−0.8pp	−0.1pp	640	−193
RKP	117,865	4.7%	±0.0pp	+0.4pp	480	−30
KD	93,257	3.7%	−0.4pp	−0.3pp	300	−51
Communist Party	11,174	0.4%	−0.1pp	+0.1pp	9	±0
Pirate	5,986	0.2%	New	−0.3pp	0	±0
Independence Party	1,303	0.1%	±0.0pp	−0.1pp	0	−2
Change 2011	1,258	0.1%	New	−0.2pp	1	+1
Communist Workers' Party – For Peace and Socialism	704	<0.1%	<0.1pp	<0.1pp	0	±0
For the Poor	572	<0.1%	<0.1pp	<0.1pp	0	±0
Workers Party	538	<0.1%	<0.1pp	<0.1pp	0	±0
Freedom Party	15	<0.1%	New	<0.1pp	0	±0
Others	41,358	1.7%	−0.8pp	+1.3pp	185	−102
Total	2,493,521				9,674	−738

Turnout was 58.3%, lower than in the previous municipal election.
