= Johanna Jurva =

Finnish politician

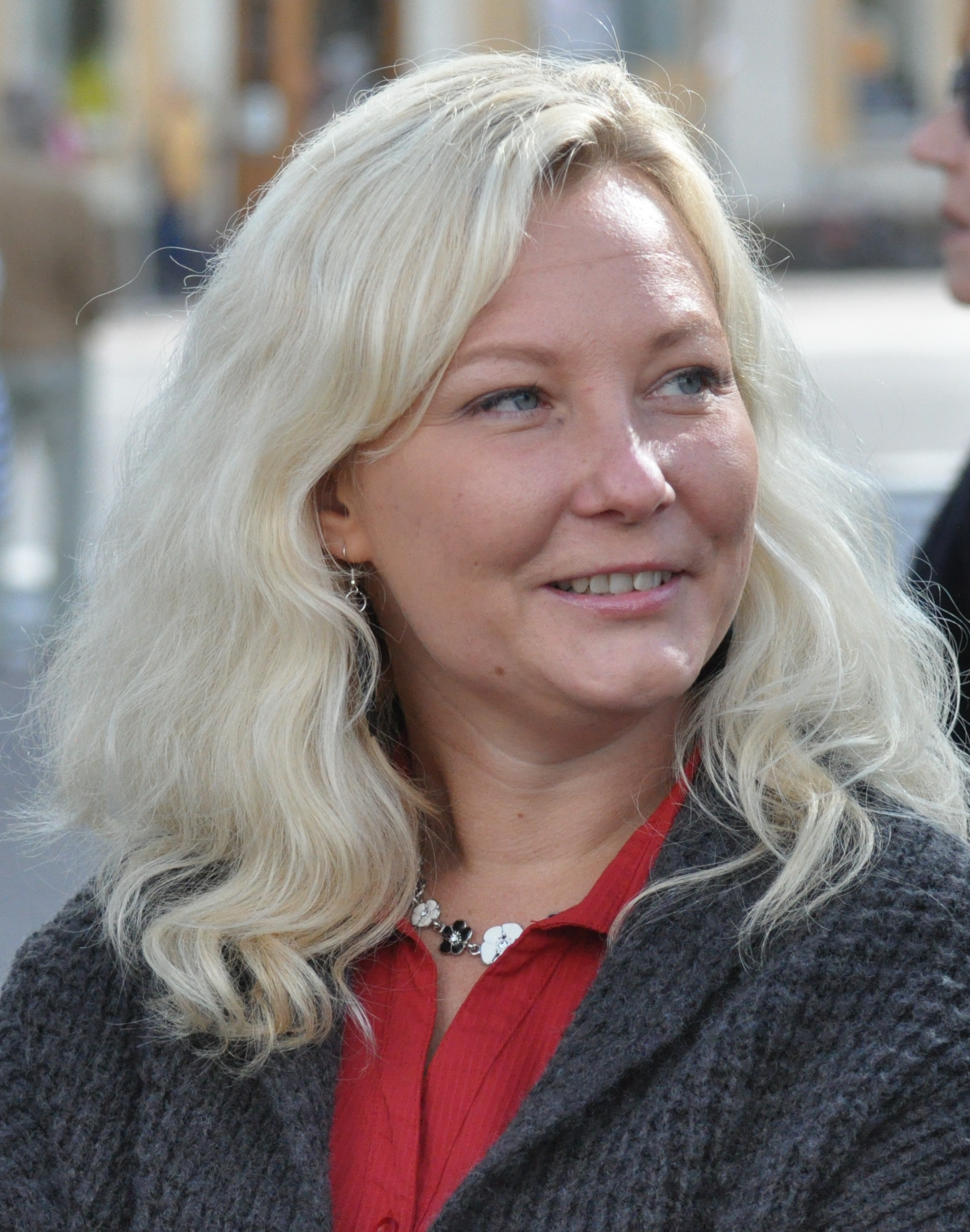
- Johanna Jurva in August 2011.

Member of Finnish Parliament for Uusimaa
- In office 20 April 2011 – 21 April 2015

Personal details
- Born: 16 May 1977 (age 48) Vantaa, Finland
- Party: True Finns

Johanna Jurva (born 16 May 1977 in Vantaa) is a Finnish politician representing the True Finns and member of the Vantaa City Council.

She was elected to the Finnish Parliament in the parliamentary election of April 2011. Jurva is a nurse by education.
