= Lauri Heikkilä =

Finnish politician (1957–2024)

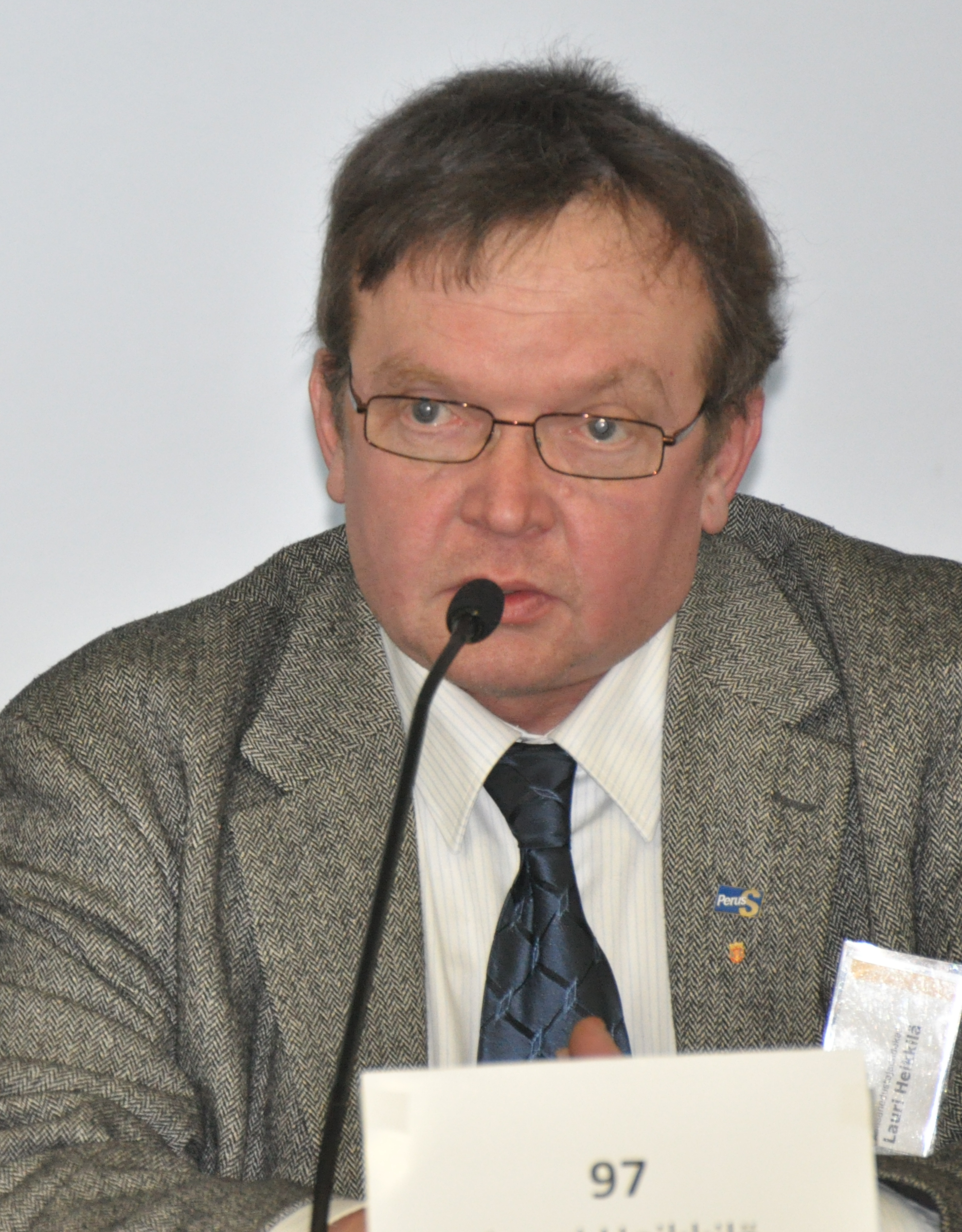

Member of the Parliament of Finland from Finland Proper
- In office 20 April 2011 – 21 April 2015

Personal details
- Born: 24 June 1957 Rymättylä, Finland
- Died: 25 March 2024 (aged 66) Strasbourg, France
- Party: Finns Party
- Education: University of Turku
- Occupation: special researcher, physicist, farmer
- Website: www.lauriheikkila.fi

Lauri Juho Antti Heikkilä (24 June 1957 – 25 March 2024) was a Finnish politician, representing the Finns Party. He was elected to the Parliament of Finland in April 2011. He was a senior researcher and a lecturer of microelectronics at the University of Turku, but he also did farming.

In the 2015 parliamentary election, Heikkilä got 3,658 votes and was not re-elected.

From 1996 to 2011, Heikkilä was much involved in the making of Finns Party platforms.

Heikkilä died of a sudden illness during a conference trip in Strasbourg, on 25 March 2024, at the age of 66.
