= Jorma Piisinen =

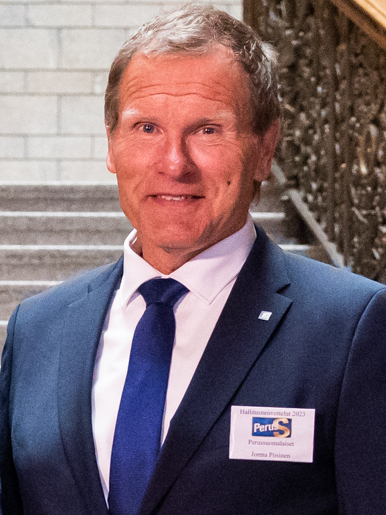

Member of the Parliament of Finland
- Incumbent
- Assumed office 2023

Personal details
- Born: March 1, 1960 (age 65); Varkaus, Finland
- Political party: Finns Party
- Occupation: Politician, journalist, television presenter
- Website: https://www.jormapiisinen.fi/

Jorma Antero Piisinen (born 1 March 1960 in Varkaus, Finland) is a Finnish television presenter, journalist and current Member of Parliament, regional councillor and city councillor in Järvenpää. He is known as the presenter of the programme Joka kodin asuntomarkkinat (The Housing Market of Every Home) on MTV3 from 1991 to 2010. Piisinen became its main character in 1993. With the publicity, Piisinen also became a popular performer at various fairs.

== Biography ==
In the 2021 municipal elections, Piisinen was elected to Järvenpää City Council as a candidate of the Finns Party with 1 038 votes, after which he was elected as the 1st vice-chairman of the City Council.

In the 2022 regional elections, Piisinen was also elected to the Keski-Uusimaa welfare area as a candidate of the Finns Party with 823 votes.

In the 2023 Parliamentary elections, Piisinen was elected as a member of parliament from the Uusimaa constituency on the lists of the Finns Party. He received 7 118 votes.
