= Kuru, Finland =

Former municipality of Finland, now part of Ylöjärvi

Coordinates: 61°52′37″N 23°43′30″E

Location of Kuru in Finland

Kuru is a former municipality of Finland, now part of the town of Ylöjärvi.

Kuru is located in the province of Western Finland and is part of the Pirkanmaa region. Kuru lies 50 kilometres (31 mi) north of Tampere. The municipality had a population of 2,782 and covered an area of 820.48 km^{2} of which 103.53 km^{2} is water. The population density was 3.4 inhabitants per km^{2}. The service industry is the primary employer for the area. Kuru was consolidated with the town of Ylöjärvi on January 1, 2009. The municipality was unilingually Finnish.

Approximately two-thirds of the Seitseminen national park is located in the municipality and represents the number one attraction for the area. Eco-tourism, nature conservation, and other nature related studies occur in Seitseminen. The park has vast forests, marshlands, and ridges of preserved land. The park is a total of 4000 km^{2}.

The water from the streams and river in Kuru is so clean, it is drinkable without purification. The vast majority of Kuru is either water or forest. In fact, 550 km^{2}, out of 820.48 km^{2}, of the district is covered with forests. Popular activities include canoeing, swimming, fishing, hiking, camping, backpacking and other outdoor activities.

Kuru has vast natural resources including wood, water and stone. The stone is used for gravestones, building material, and memorial statues. The stone is also used for jewelry and souvenirs. The more popular variety of stone that comes from Kuru includes grey granite and "pallograniitti" (orbicular granite), a rare variety with decorative ring-shaped forms in it.

Kuru is also home to the forestry department of Tampere College (Tampereen Ammattiopisto in Finnish), where they host international wilderness guide, forestry and log house building courses.

== People born in Kuru ==
- Emanuel Kolkki (1869 – 1940)
- Kalle Kaakko-oja (1875 – 1942)
- Artturi Tienari (1907 – 1998)
- Tauno Kovanen (1917–1986)
- Seppo Lehto (born 1962)
