= Tampere Vocational College Tredu =

College in Tampere, Finland

- Type: Public
- Established: 2000
- Students: 10,800
- Location: Tampere, Finland
- Colors: Blue and white
- Nickname: Tredu
- Website: http://tredu.fi

Tampere Vocational College Tredu (Finnish: Tampereen seudun ammattiopisto Tredu) is a vocational college based in Tampere, Finland. It is part of the Tampere Upper Secondary Education and offers study vocational programmes in Finnish secondary education. In 2013, Pirkanmaa Educational Consortium and Tampere College united to become Tampere Vocational College Tredu. It offers more than 100 programmes in seven out of eight vocational education sectors which exist in the Finnish vocational education standards:

- Culture Sector
- Social Sciences, Business, and Administration Sector
- Natural Sciences Sector
- Technology, Communications, and Transport Sector
- Natural Resources and the Environment Sector
- Social Services, Health and Sports Sector
- Tourism, Catering and Domestic Services Sector

Its campus is located in Tampere, except for the forestry campus which is located in Kuru, Ylöjärvi.

== See also ==
- Tampere
- Education in Finland
