= Artturi Tienari =

Finnish politician

Artturi Tienari (31 October 1907 in Kuru – 26 April 1998) was a Finnish Civil Guard officer, business executive and politician. He was a member of the Parliament of Finland from 1954 to 1957, representing the People's Party of Finland.
