= Pietari Jääskeläinen =

Finnish politician (born 1947)

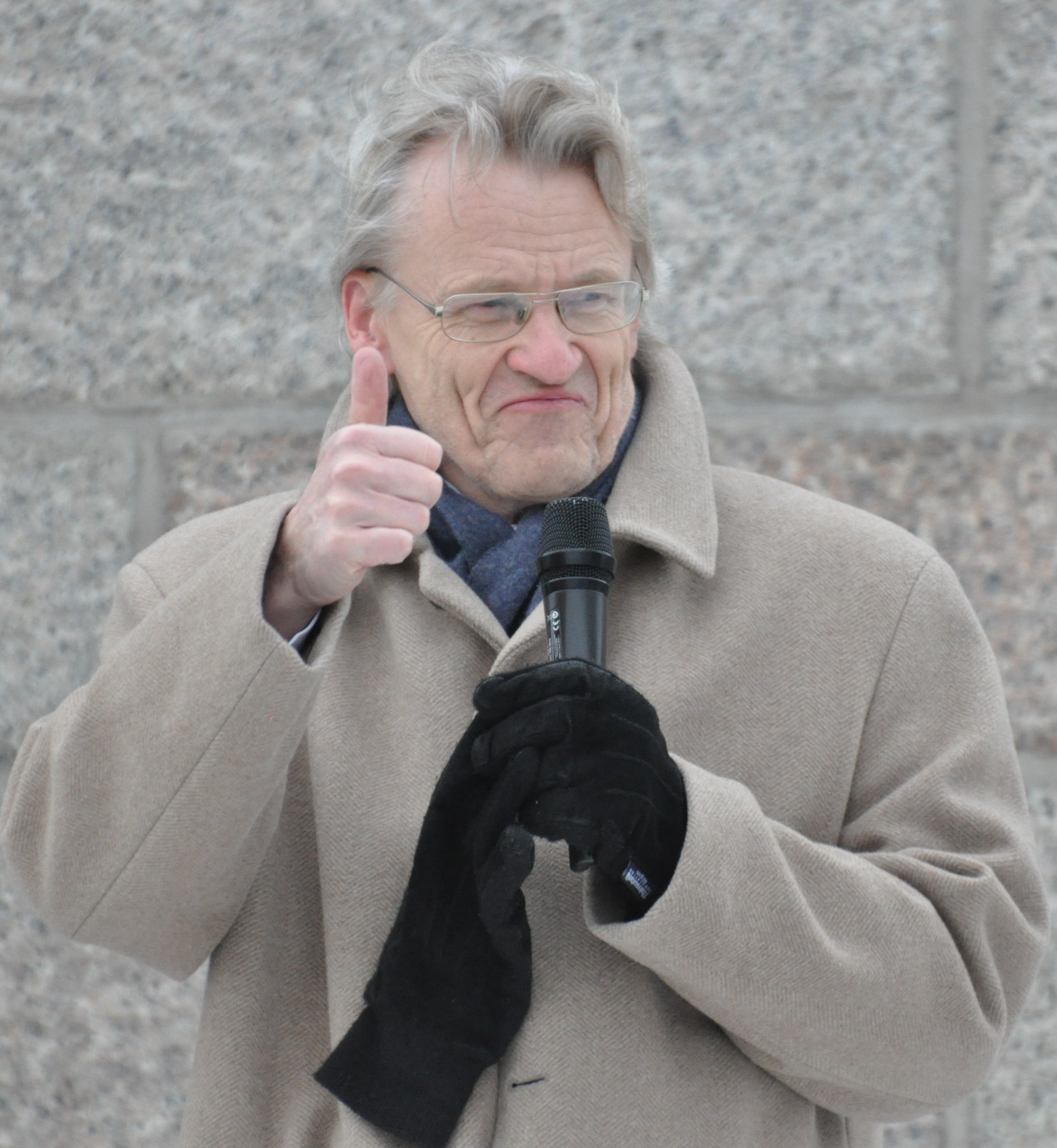

Member of Finnish Parliament for Uusimaa
- In office 13 July 2009 – 23 April 2015
- Preceded by: Timo Soini

Personal details
- Born: 20 June 1947 (age 78)
- Party: The Finns Party

Pietari Osmo Jääskeläinen (born 20 June 1947 in Hankasalmi) is a Finnish politician who was member of Finnish Parliament in 2009–2015, representing The Finns Party. He became a member of Finnish Parliament in 2009 when Timo Soini was elected to the European Parliament and was re-elected in 2011. In 2015 Finnish parliamentary election, he was not re-elected.
