= Change 2011 =

Change 2011 Muutos 2011 (Finnish) Förändring 2011 (Swedish)
- Founded: 4 June 2009
- Membership: 476 (27 April 2011)
- Ideology: Direct democracy Anti-immigration; Populism
- Colours: Light blue Dark blue

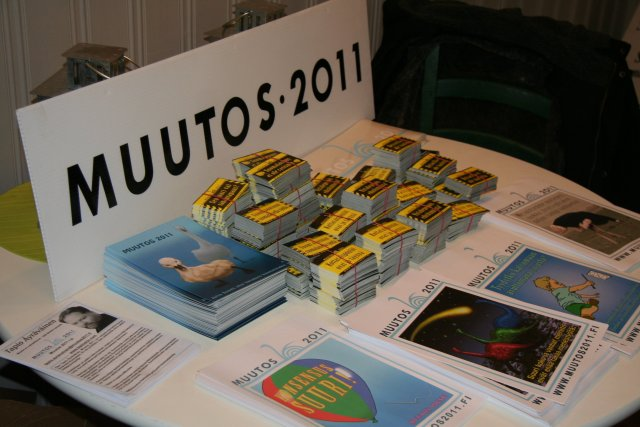
Change 2011 material

Change 2011 (Finnish: Muutos 2011, Swedish: Förändring 2011) is a Finnish political party founded in 2009. The party's name refers to 2011 Finnish parliamentary election, the first election the party participated in. The party's main goals are direct democracy, freedom of speech, and the interest of the citizens of Finland. The party also wants to "rationalize" immigration politics, and have "just sentences" given for violent and sexual crimes.

On 4 June 2010, the party announced that it had succeeded to gather the 5,000 supporter cards required in order to become officially registered. On 8 October 2010, it became a registered political party.

In the Finnish parliamentary election of 2011, Change 2011 got 0.26% (7,504) of total votes. None of the party's candidates were elected to the parliament, but in October 2013 James Hirvisaari became the party's first MP, when he joined the party having been expelled from the Finns Party. In the Finnish parliamentary election in 2015, the party got 7,434 or 0.3% of total votes, and was left without seats in the parliament.

After the 2015 parliamentary election, Change 2011 was stricken from the party register, as it had failed to win a seat in two consecutive parliamentary elections.

== Election results ==
Parliamentary elections
Year	Elected	Votes	Share
2011	0	7,504	0.26%
2015	0	7,434	0.3%

European Parliament elections
Year	Elected	Votes	Share
2014	0	4,768	0.28%

Municipal elections
Year	Elected	Votes	Share
2012	1	1,258	0.1%

== Leaders ==
=== Leaders ===
- Juha Mäki-Ketelä (2009–2010)
- Jiri Keronen (2010–2011)
- Marjukka Kaakkola (2012–2013)
- Jari Leino (2014–2015)
- Jari Väli-Klemelä (2015–2016)
- Anita Saarinen (2016–present)

=== Vice-leaders ===
- Jiri Keronen (2009–2010)
- Teemu Lavikka (2010–2011)
- Timo Röyhkiö (2012)
- Timo Hellman (2012)
- Jorma Piironen (2013)
- Helena Eronen (the 1st) (2014–2015)
- Kyuu Eturautti (the 2nd) (2014–2015)
- Kyuu Eturautti (the 1st) (2015)
- Laura Lehtinen (the 2nd) (2015)
- Laura Lehtinen (the 1st) (2016)
- Kim Ahonen (the 1st) (2017–present)
