= Jan Sundberg =

Finnish political scientist

Jan Sundberg (born 12 December 1949) is a professor of the department of the political science in the University of Helsinki. He has published many studies concerning the party system of Finland both in English and Swedish languages. He has also given interviews to Hufvudstadsbladet.

== Mass media ==
Sundberg opposes the idea of merging bigger municipalities and cut the amount of the municipalities from 336 to near 100 municipalities as Jyrki Katainen had suggested. This would, according to Sundberg, threaten democracy, which is learnt in the best way in the municipal offices.

Sundberg has also served as an election specialist for the foreign ministry press department
