= Seppo Lehto =

Finnish nationalist (born 1962)

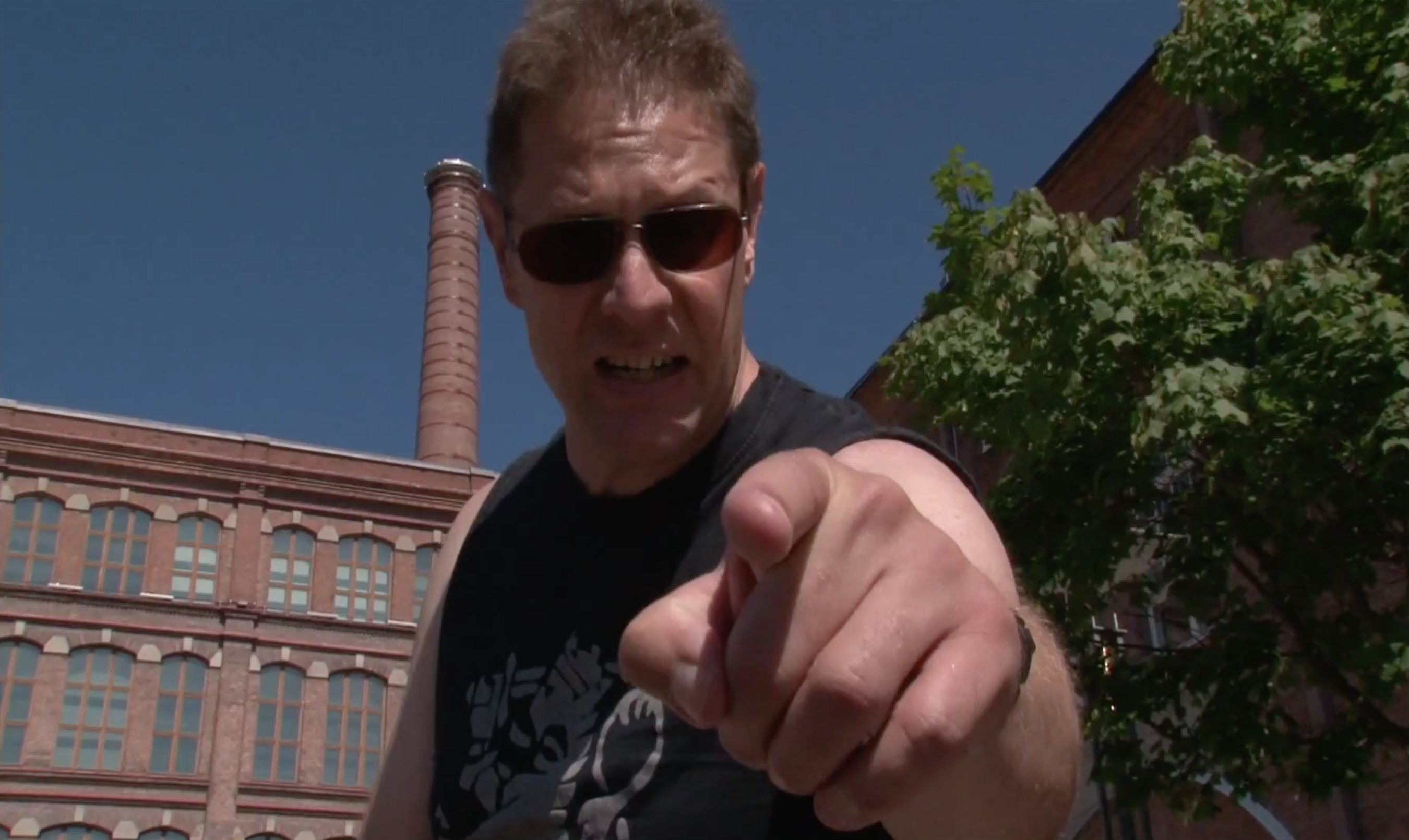
- Born: 6 September 1962 (age 64); Kuru, Finland
- Political party: Christian Democrats (2004); Independent

Seppo Lehto (born 6 September 1962 in Kuru) is a Finnish nationalist, currently living in Tampere. The main theme of his activism is the return of Finnish territories ceded to the Soviet Union in World War II. He also claims to lead several organizations.

He has also drawn caricatures of Muhammad. Lehto appeared in the news in 2011 when an al-Qaeda operative named Abu Sulaiman al-Nasser called for his beheading for defaming Muhammad.

Lehto has hosted a podcast called Patrioottiradio, and become well known for creating numerous blogs to disparage politicians and members of racial, ethnic and religious minorities.

In May 2005 Lehto was convicted of assaulting an Afghan refugee and had to pay fines. On 30 May 2008, the Tampere District Court sentenced Lehto to two years and five months' imprisonment. Lehto was charged with nine counts of gross defamation, inciting ethnic hatred and religious blasphemy against Islam. The defamations included sexual slander towards the victims, claiming the victims to be guilty of fabricated crimes and writing disturbing material as if they were written by the victims (Identity theft). Some blog entries were also inciting violence against the victims. Over 40 blog sites were closed by the court's decision. Lehto had previously served a suspended sentence for defamation and was under probation; the fresh conviction meant that his three-month sentence would become mandatory.

On 3 October 2013, Speaker of the Parliament announced that Seppo Lehto is no longer welcome in the Parliament House of Finland after he performed a Nazi salute there and published a photo of the act on the Internet. His host, Finns Party member of the parliament James Hirvisaari, was also expelled from the Finns Party due to this event.

Lehto's attempts to enter politics through elections have been unsuccessful.
