= Olli Immonen =

Finnish politician

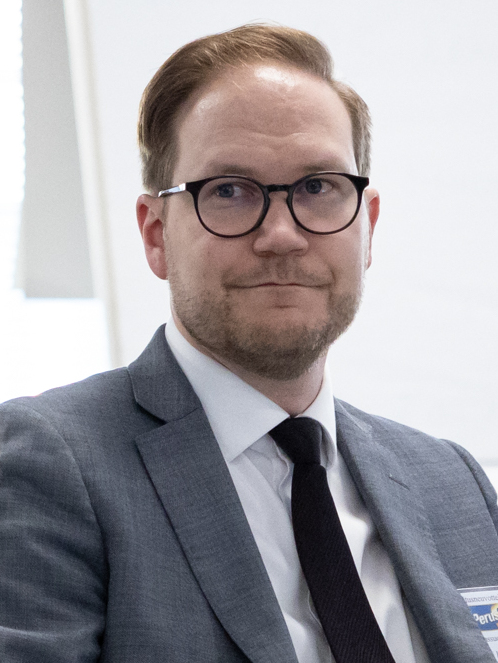

Member of Finnish Parliament
- In office 20 April 2011 – 4 April 2023

Personal details
- Born: 12 February 1986 (age 40) Nivala, North Ostrobothnia, Finland
- Party: Finns Party

Olli Immonen (born 12 February 1986) is a Finnish politician who served as member of the Finnish Parliament for the Finns Party from 2011 to 2023. He is also the former chairman of the nationalist organization Suomen Sisu.

Immonen was born in Nivala, and received national attention in July 2015 after writing a controversial anti-multicultural text on his Facebook page.
