= Johannes Luukkanen =

Finnish footballer (born 1999)

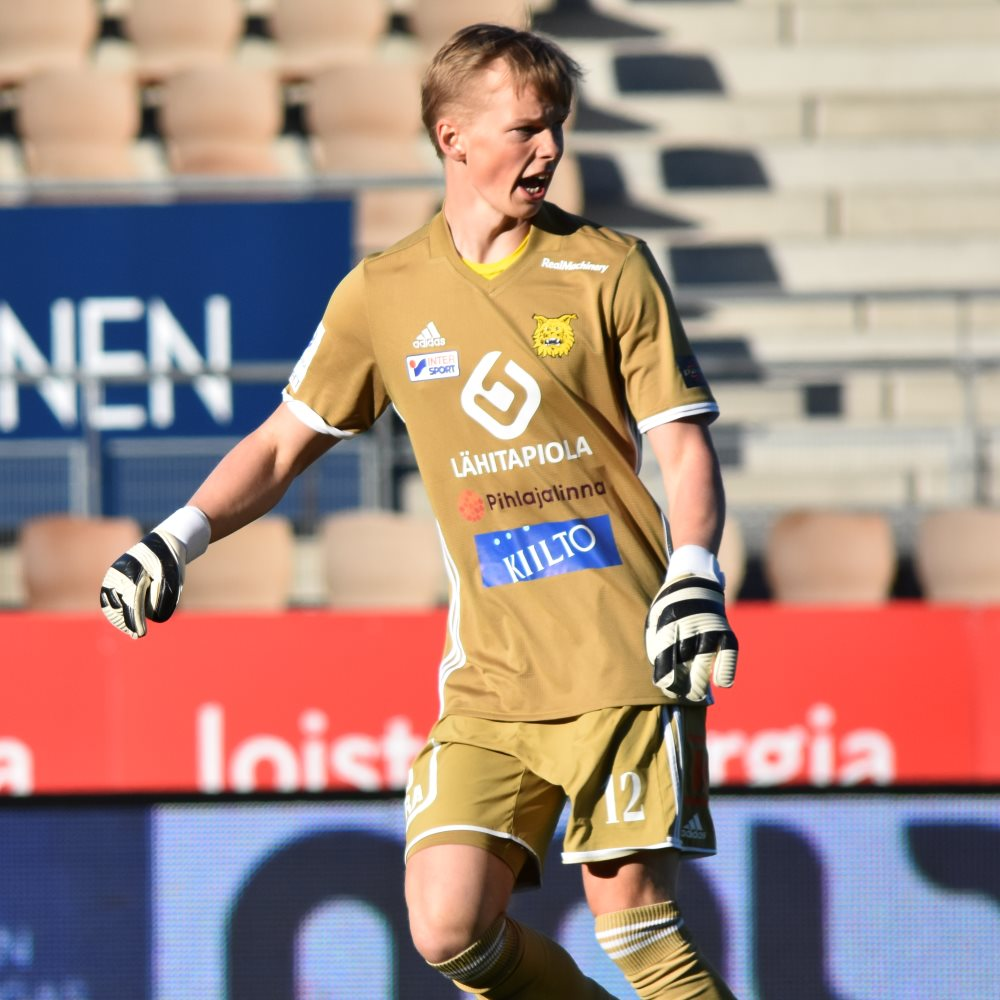

Personal information
- Date of birth: 30 March 1999 (age 27)
- Position: Goalkeeper

Team information
- Current team: FC Ilves

Senior career*
Years	Team	Apps	(Gls)
2016	Klubi 04	0	(0)
2017–	FC Ilves	4	(0)
- * Club domestic league appearances and goals as of 11:05, 6 June 2018 (UTC)

Johannes Luukkanen (born 30 March 1999) is a Finnish professional footballer who plays for FC Ilves, as a goalkeeper.
