= Lisa Bjurwald =

Swedish journalist and writer

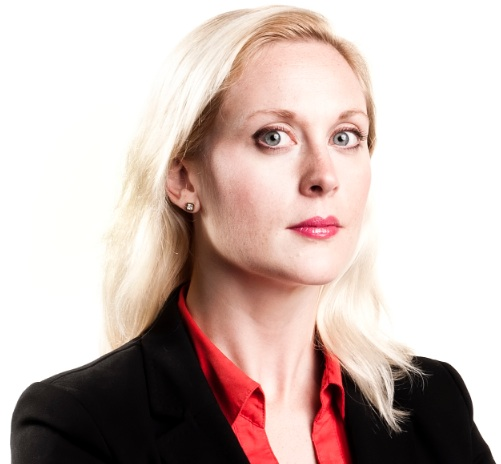
- Lisa Bjurwald in 2016)
- Born: Lisa Bjurwald; 24 December 1978 (age 46); Sweden

Lisa Bjurwald (born 24 December 1978) is a Swedish award-winning journalist and author, covering culture and politics. Since 2023, she is the political editor at regional Swedish newspaper Vestmanlands Läns Tidning. She is a regular contributor to, for example, the culture pages of Expressen and to The Local.

She has worked for media such as Expo, between 2006 and 2011, she was editorial writer for Svenska Dagbladet in 2007 and Dagens Nyheter, between 2008 and 2011. She has also been a columnist in Expressen newspaper and Journalisten. 2011–2017 she was part-owner and editor at Medievärlden. 2017–2019 she was editor-in-chief of Författaren magazine.

In 2010, one of her reports won the European parliament journalist prize. In 2013 she received the Teskedsordens book prize for her book Skrivbordskrigarna – Hur extrema krafter utnyttjar internet. She is a Raoul Wallenberg Award nominee (2018).

== Bibliography ==
- Varför public service? (2008)
- Den ömtåliga plantan (2008)
- God dag kampsyster! (2009)
- Europas skam – Rasister på frammarsch (2011)
- Skrivbordskrigarna. Hur extrema krafter utnyttjar Internet (2013)
- Tills bara aska återstår (2016)
- Ta min hand (2017)
- BB-krisen. Sveket vid livets början (2019)
- Gärningsmannen är polis. Om trakasserier och tystnadskultur inom svensk polis (2021)
- Slava Ukraini! Women's Resistance under Russia's War (2023)
