= Juho Eerola =

Finnish politician of the Finns Party

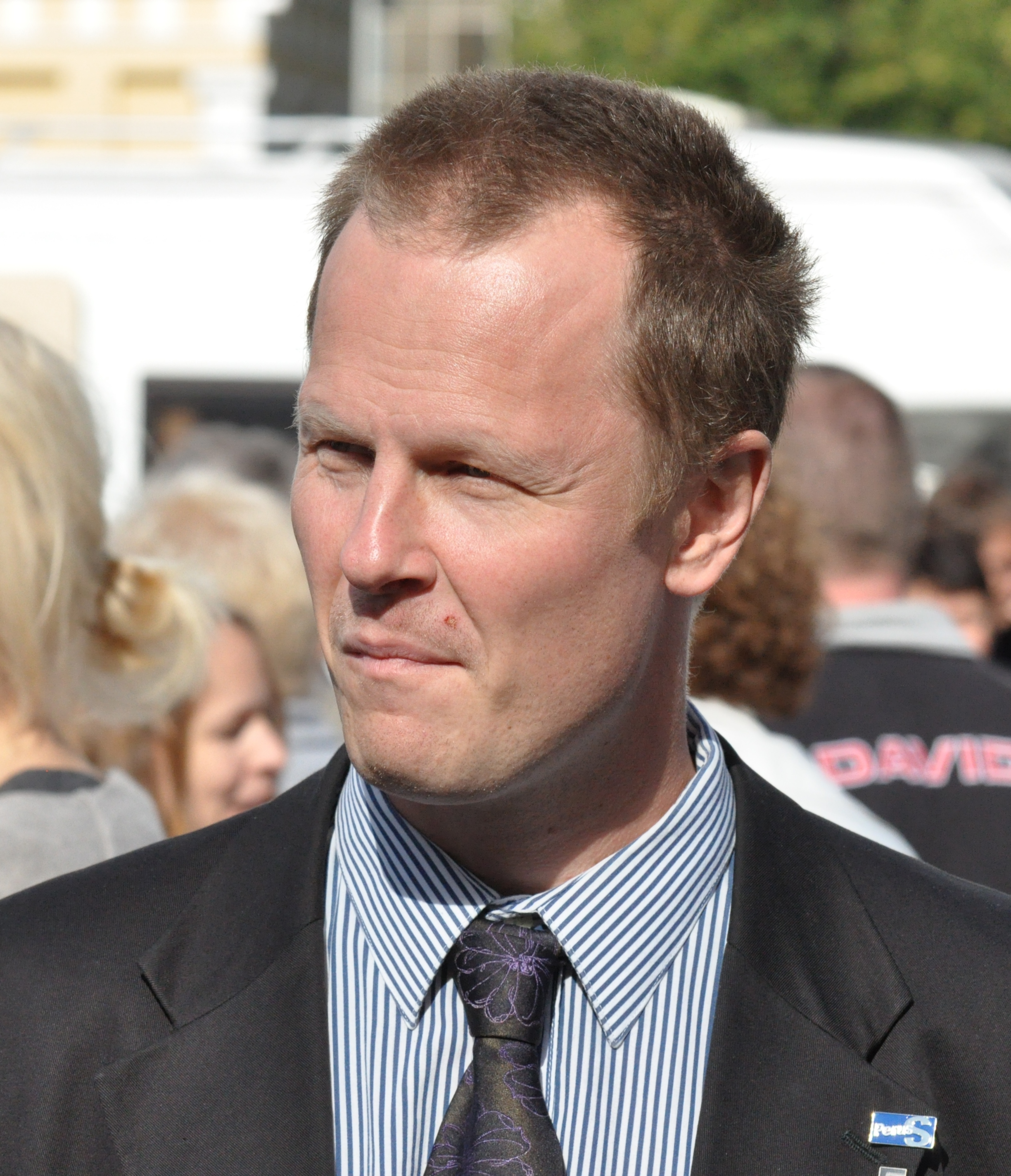
- Juho Eerola in 2011.

Second Deputy Speaker of the Parliament of Finland
- In office 7 June 2019 – 21 June 2023
- Preceded by: Paula Risikko

Member of Finnish Parliament for South Eastern Finland
- Incumbent
- Assumed office 22 April 2015

Member of Finnish Parliament for Kymi
- In office 20 April 2011 – 21 April 2015

Personal details
- Born: 24 February 1975 (age 51) Kymi, Kymenlaakso, Finland
- Party: Finns

Juho Seppo Antero Eerola (born 24 February 1975 in Kymi, Finland) is a Finnish politician of the Finns Party. He was elected to the Finnish Parliament in the 2011 election. He is also a member of the city council of Kotka. In the True Finns' party conference of 2011 Eerola was elected as the party's second vice-chairman, and in the conference of 2013 he was elected as the third vice-chairman. Eerola is a former member of the nationalist organisation Suomen Sisu: he resigned his membership in 2012 when he felt that people outside the party were using the issue as a wedge against him and the party.

In 2011 the hacktivist group Anonymous leaked the membership applications of the Finnish Resistance Movement on Pastebin. It was revealed that Ulla Pyysalo, the aide of Juho Eerola, had applied for membership in the neo-nazi organization.

== Controversy ==
In December 2025, Eerola was among Finns Party politicians criticised for posting a social media image mimicking a gesture of pulling the corners of her eyes, widely regarded as a racist mockery of East Asian people. The post was made in support of Sarah Dzafce, the former Miss Finland who was stripped of her title after a similar gesture in a viral photo. Eerola has since said that he was “deeply sorry that [my] photo caused offense to Asian people."
