= Arto Luukkanen =

Finnish historian and social scientist (born 1964)

Arto Luukkanen in 2026

Arto Pekka Luukkanen (born 28 November 1964) is a Finnish historian and social scientist, specialising in Russian and Eastern European research at the University of Helsinki Renvall Institute.

Luukkanen is also a commentator on Russian public and political issues. He received his doctorate in theology at the University of Helsinki in 1994. He is docent in general church history at the University of Helsinki, docent of Russian history at the University of Tampere and political docent of history at the University of Turku. He has written five monographs and several articles in this area.

Luukkanen's debut novel Suojelusenkeli was published in 2014.

== Books in English ==
- The party of unbelief: The religious policy of the Bolshevik party Doctoral dissertation, University of Helsinki. Studia historica 48. 1994. ISBN 951-710-008-6 Helsinki: SHS, 1994. ISBN 951-710-008-6. (In English)
- The religious policy of the Stalinist state: A case study: The Central Standing Commission on Religious Questions, 1929–1938 Studia historica 57, Helsinki: Finnish Historical Society, 1997. ISBN 951-710-068-X Helsinki: Catalan Historical Society, 1997. ISBN 951-710-068-X. (In English)
