= 2012 Finnish presidential election =

- 22 January 2012 (first round); 5 February 2012 (second round)
- Turnout: 69.74% (first round); 65.98% (second round)
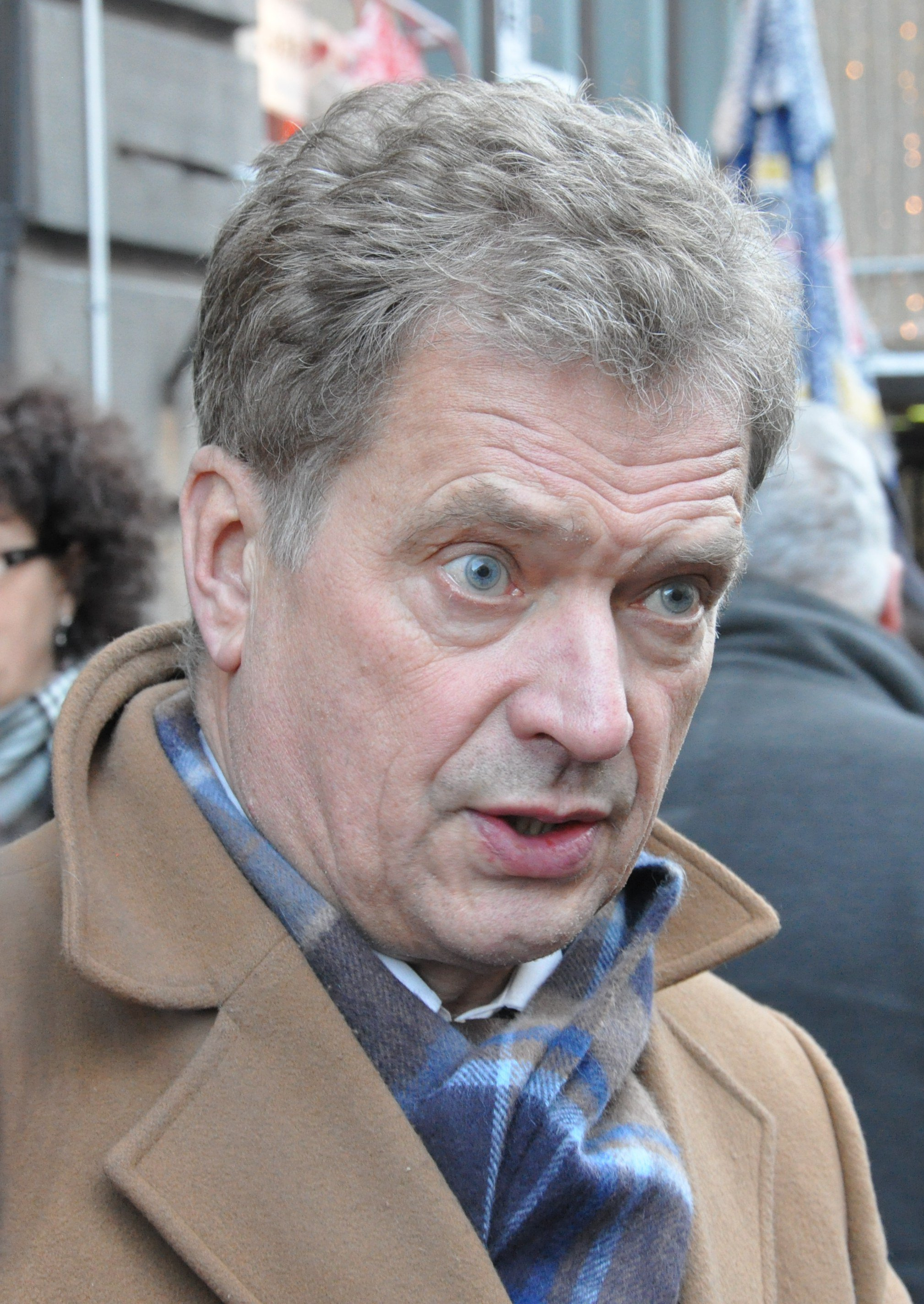

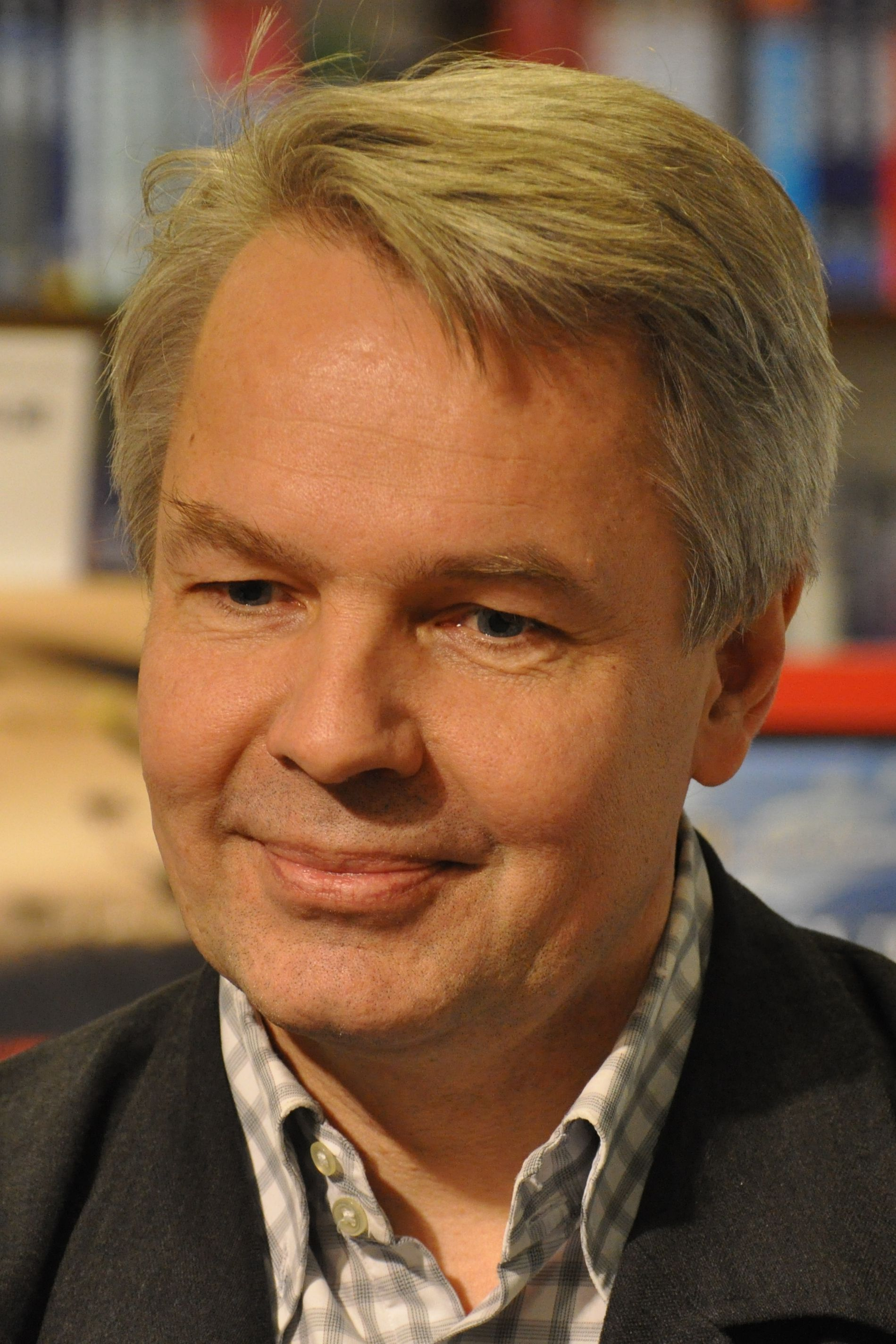
Candidate	Sauli Niinistö	Pekka Haavisto
Party	National Coalition	Green
Popular vote	1,802,328	1,077,425
Percentage	62.59%	37.41%
- Niinistö: 50–55% 55–60% 60–65% 65–70% 70–75% 75–80% 80–85% 85–90% Haavisto: 50–55% 55–60% 60–65%
President before election
Tarja Halonen
SDP
Elected President
Sauli Niinistö
National Coalition

Presidential elections were held in Finland in January and February 2012. The first round took place on 22 January 2012 with advance voting between 11 and 17 January. Since no candidate received a majority of the vote, a second round was held on 5 February, with advance voting between 25 and 31 January. Sauli Niinistö was elected the President of Finland for a term from 1 March 2012 until 1 March 2018.

All eight political parties represented in Parliament nominated a candidate during the latter half of 2011. Incumbent President Tarja Halonen was ineligible for re-election, having served the maximum two terms.

As no candidate received a majority of votes in the first round, a runoff election was held between the top two candidates, Sauli Niinistö of the National Coalition Party (who had received 37% of the first-round vote), and Pekka Haavisto of the Green League (19%). Niinistö led opinion polls prior to the elections, while Haavisto was neck-and-neck with Paavo Väyrynen of the Centre Party competing for second place, ultimately defeating Väyrynen by a margin of 1.3 percentage points (about 37,000 votes). Niinistö won the second round with 63% of the vote, while Haavisto received 37% of the vote.

The elections marked an end to an era of Social Democratic presidents. The Social Democrats had held the office for a continuous period of 30 years. It was also the first time that a Green League candidate was on the runoff ballot.

== Power of the president ==
The president's powers were curtailed in the constitutional reform in 2000, and yet further in 2012. Currently the President leads the Finnish foreign policy together with the cabinet. EU affairs, however, fall to the Prime Minister's authority. The President has little domestic power. He or she can dissolve the parliament, but only at the Prime Minister's request. The President can choose not to ratify a bill, but this only returns it to parliament, which must then approve the bill again in order for it to become a law without the President's signature. The President's power to appoint officials has been reduced, but he or she still appoints all military officers as well as judges. The President is the Commander-in-Chief of the Finnish Defence Forces. The President also has the power to pardon anyone convicted of a crime.

With the curtailment of the President's formal powers, many analysts have emphasized the President's position as a leader of values.

== Candidates ==
All eight parties represented in the Parliament nominated a candidate. The nomination was unanimous in seven parties, while the Social Democratic Party's candidate was decided in a primary, which was won by Paavo Lipponen with 67% of the votes defeating Tuula Haatainen, who got 22% of the votes, and Ilkka Kantola who received 11% of the votes. Each candidate was given a number from 2 to 9 – voting took place by writing the candidate's number on the ballot paper.

Constituency associations for independents or parties not represented in the Parliament must gather 20,000 signatures from eligible voters in order to participate in the election. In 2012, no such associations participated. Pekka Hallberg, the President of the Supreme Administrative Court, considered running as a non-partisan candidate, but eventually withdrew.

=== Confirmed candidates ===
Candidates
Pekka Haavisto; Green League; Member of Parliament, former Minister of the Environment; Electoral number: 2 Nominated 11 June	Timo Soini; True Finns; Member of Parliament, party leader Electoral number: 3 Nominated 15 October	Paavo Väyrynen; Centre Party; Former Minister of Foreign Affairs, Former Minister for Foreign Trade; Electoral number: 4 Nominated 29 October	Paavo Lipponen; Social Democratic Party; Former Prime Minister, former Speaker of the Parliament; Electoral number: 5 Nominated 8 October
Sauli Niinistö; National Coalition Party; Former Minister of Finance, former Speaker of the Parliament; Electoral number: 6 Nominated 22 October	Sari Essayah; Christian Democrats; Member of the European Parliament; Electoral number: 7 Nominated 26 November	Eva Biaudet; Swedish People's Party; Ombudsman for Minorities, former Minister of Health and Social Services; Electoral number: 8 Nominated 22 October	Paavo Arhinmäki; Left Alliance; Incumbent Minister of Culture and Sport, party leader Electoral number: 9 Nominated 20 November

=== Previously plausible candidates ===
National Coalition Party

Declined to run:

- Jorma Ollila, Chairman of Nokia and Royal Dutch Shell, was proposed as a possible joint candidate of the National Coalition Party and the Centre Party by Professor Erkki Laatikainen. He declined presidential candidacy for any party in August 2011.
- Alexander Stubb, Minister for Europe and Foreign Trade and former Minister for Foreign Affairs.

Social Democratic Party

Announced, then defeated in primary:

- Ilkka Kantola, Member of Parliament and former Bishop of the Archdiocese of Turku.
- Tuula Haatainen, former Minister of Education, former Minister of Social Affairs and Health.

Declined to run:
The following persons initially expressed interest toward running or were mentioned in speculation, but did not sign up for the party's primary, which started on 22 August.

- Erkki Tuomioja, Minister for Foreign Affairs.
- Mitro Repo, Member of the European Parliament and pastor in the Helsinki Orthodox Parish (temporarily banned from serving).
- Martti Ahtisaari, former president and Nobel Peace Prize laureate.
- Maria Guzenina-Richardson, Minister of Health and Social Services.
- Tuire Santamäki-Vuori, President of the Trade Union for the Public and Welfare Sectors.
- Lauri Ihalainen, Minister of Labour, former President of the Central Organisation of Finnish Trade Unions.
- Johannes Koskinen, Member of Parliament, former Minister of Justice.
- Tarja Filatov, Member of Parliament, former Minister of Labour.
- Pentti Arajärvi, Professor of the University of Eastern Finland, Doctor of Law, First Gentleman of Finland.
- Raimo Sailas, Secretary of State in the Ministry of Finance.
- Kaari Utrio, a writer.
- Suvi-Anne Siimes, former leader of Left Alliance, was proposed as a united candidate from the left.
- Erkki Liikanen, Governor of the Bank of Finland.
- Lasse Lehtinen, former Member of Parliament, former Member of European Parliament.
- Eero Heinäluoma, Speaker of the Parliament of Finland.
- Liisa Jaakonsaari, Member of the European Parliament, former Minister of Labour.

Centre Party

Declined to run:
The following persons were mentioned in speculation, but none of them signed up for the party's primary by the deadline 9 September. Paavo Väyrynen was the only announced candidate and thus a primary was not needed.

- Esko Aho, former Prime Minister.
- Christoffer Taxell, former Minister of Justice and former Minister of Education, was proposed as a possible joint candidate of the Centre Party and the Swedish People's Party.
- Paula Lehtomäki, Member of Parliament, former Minister of the Environment, former Minister for Foreign Trade and Development.
- Matti Vanhanen, former Prime Minister.
- Mari Kiviniemi, party leader, former Prime Minister.
- Seppo Kääriäinen, Member of Parliament, former Minister of Defence, former Minister of Trade and Industry.
- Anneli Jäätteenmäki, Member of European Parliament, former Prime Minister
- Olli Rehn, European Commissioner for Economic and Financial Affairs.
- Jorma Ollila, Chairman of Nokia and Royal Dutch Shell, was proposed as a possible joint candidate of the Centre Party and the National Coalition Party by Professor Erkki Laatikainen.
- Sirkka-Liisa Anttila, former Minister of Agriculture and Forestry.

Swedish People's Party

Declined to run:

- Christoffer Taxell, former Minister of Justice and former Minister of Education, was proposed as a possible joint candidate of the Swedish People's Party and the Centre Party.

Other parties

- Terttu Savola, party leader and a member of Espoo City Council, was a proposed candidate of For the Poor. Failed to collect the 20,000 signatures needed for a minor party candidate.
- Harri Kivistö, party secretary, was endorsed by the Pirate Party, but the party withdrew from the race, citing "stiff bureaucracy" the party encountered as the reason.

== Campaign ==
According to political analysts Salla Laaksonen and Kimmo Elo, the main dividing line between the presidential candidates in this election is not the traditional division over ideology, but instead voters are placing more stress on a candidate's views on the EU and social issues.

Professor Leif Åberg has described the campaign as "relatively civil," but there have been a few accusations of negative campaigning. Some of Pekka Haavisto's supporters felt offended over a television advert by the Paavo Väyrynen campaign which says that "a house needs a master and a mistress." Haavisto's supporters interpreted this as a taunt on Haavisto's relationship status (Haavisto lives in a registered partnership with another man). Väyrynen responded by rejecting this interpretation and in turn accused Haavisto's supporters of deliberately twisting his words. The satirical television programme YleLeaks mocked the election in mid-December 2011. Niinistö's wife, Jenni Haukio, complained with a letter to YLE's A Studio saying that she was a private person. An A-Studio political reporter also criticised Iltalehti of news in favour of Sauli Niinistö. Foreign Minister Erkki Tuomioja accused editor A.-P. Pietilä of undervaluing Haavisto's abilities in foreign policy based on his companion; Pietilä wrote, citing an unnamed civil servant, that Haavisto's election as president might complicate Finland's bid for being elected as a non-permanent member in the UN Security Council as several countries where homosexuality is outlawed might oppose the bid in this scenario. (Pietilä works for Suomen Lehtiyhtymä, which is owned by the NCP MP Eero Lehti).

=== Funding ===
The parties budgeted less money for their campaigns than during the last presidential election in 2006. This was in part due to the 2008 financial crisis and in part due to scandals involving campaign funding over the last few years. According to initial estimates, the four largest parties planned to spend less than 3 million euros combined.

Of the second round candidates, Niinistö's budget was 1.2 million euros and Haavisto's budget was 725,000 euros.

=== Debates ===
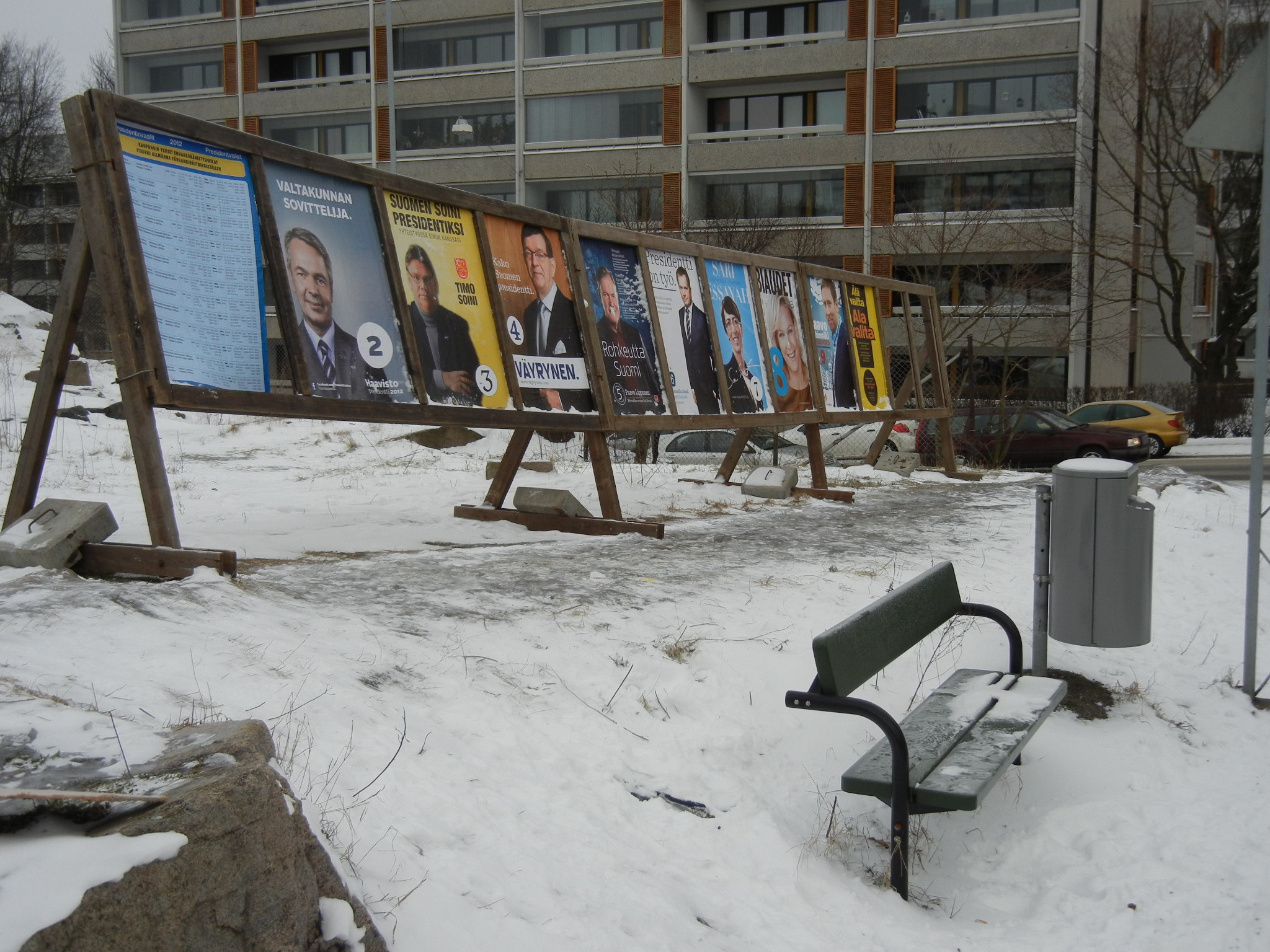
2012 Finnish presidential election posters, first round.

First round

MTV3 organised a debate with all eight candidates on 14 December. When discussing the European sovereign debt crisis six of the candidates believed in the survival of the euro, while Soini and Väyrynen believed that the eurozone would dissolve in one way or another. Väyrynen accused Lipponen and Niinistö of misleading the parliament, when Finland joined the common currency in the early years of the 2000s (when Lipponen and Niinistö were the leading figures of the government). Soini was the only candidate to answer that as president he would address the issue of returning Finnish Karelia to Finland in discussions with the Russian government. All candidates were opposed to Finland joining NATO, although for slightly differing reasons. Soini and Essayah underlined the importance of credible national defence, expressing concerns about defence cuts. Lipponen too was concerned about NATO membership's effects on the Defence Forces. Niinistö said that increasing security cooperation within the EU might make joining the NATO unnecessary in the long run. Biaudet stressed European defence as well, while Arhinmäki wanted to strengthen the role of the UN. EU issues were topmost in the YLE debate on 15 December as well.

In a debate organised by Helsingin Sanomat and Nelonen on 17 January, the last day of advance voting, all candidates expressed concerns regarding the social marginalisation of the youth. All eight were also critical toward possible increases of Finland's guarantees in the European Financial Stability Facility, although Lipponen stressed the importance of European cooperation and Biaudet said that Finland should actively participate in the solving of the EU's debt problems. While seven candidates thought that the president's role in EU affairs is primarily supporting the cabinet led by the prime minister, Soini wanted to pursue more independent policies if elected. Niinistö, Haavisto, Arhinmäki and Biaudet were worried about the opinion polls' effect on tactical voting and were willing to ban the publishment of opinion polls two weeks prior to an election.

In a second MTV3 debate on 18 January Lipponen accused Niinistö of hypocrisy, saying that although Niinistö has spoken against greediness he has also accepted funding from millionaires, who, according to Lipponen, have laid off thousands of workers. Arhinmäki attacked Niinistö over Niinistö's condemnation of illegal strikes, with Arhinmäki himself maintaining that there is no such a thing as an illegal strike. Niinistö defended himself against his critics, saying that everyone has to participate in common efforts to thwart the 2008 financial crisis and that labour disputes should be resolved within legal means. Soini confronted Haavisto, saying that Haavisto's party, the Green League, wants to make people pay more for energy. Haavisto responded by slightly distancing himself from his party, saying that the election is about individual candidates instead of parties.

The final debate prior to the first round was held by YLE on 19 January. The candidates were asked to comment on former president Mauno Koivisto's statement, where Koivisto expressed concern over the continued curtailment of the president's formal power. Soini and Väyrynen shared Koivisto's concern and were willing to increase the president's powers, while the other six candidates were content with the current situation. When discussing NATO, Väyrynen and Arhinmäki accused Niinistö and Lipponen of being too favourable toward NATO membership. Niinistö and Lipponen denied these charges, with the latter dismissing them as "conspiracy theories".

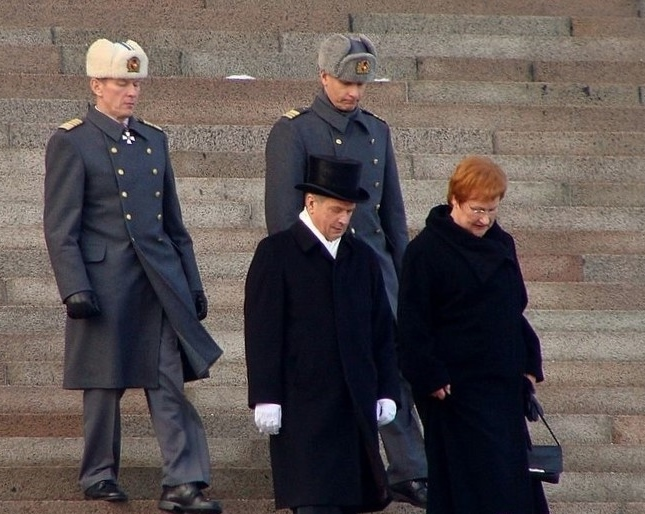
Sauli Niinistö and Tarja Halonen

Second round

Helsingin Sanomat wrote that during a YLE debate on 30 January "practically the only question" to bring out differences between Niinistö and Haavisto was their stance on Finland's possible future membership of the UN Security Council. Niinistö said that, if a member, more active participation in peace keeping operations would be expected from Finland, while Haavisto emphasised civilian crisis management. In another YLE debate on 2 February, economic issues showed some distinctions between the two candidates with Niinistö underlining the importance of economic growth and restraining the growth of debt and Haavisto expressing concerns about the impacts of economic growth on the environment and inequality. Analysts Juhana Torkki and Pertti Timonen stated that both Niinistö and Haavisto tread carefully during campaigning prior to the runoff and that this campaign had less "drama" than that of the first round.

== Opinion polling ==
First round

Poll source and date	2 Pekka Haavisto	3 Timo Soini	4 Paavo Väyrynen	5 Paavo Lipponen	6 Sauli Niinistö	7 Sari Essayah	8 Eva Biaudet	9 Paavo Arhinmäki
Research Insight Finland, 19 January 2012	13%	6%	11%	4%	32%	2%	2%	3%
Taloustutkimus, 19 January 2012	12%	6%	10%	5%	29%	2%	2%	4%
Research Insight Finland, 17 January 2012	11%	7%	12%	3%	37%	2%	2%	3%
TNS Gallup, 17 January 2012	17%	9%	17%	6%	39%	3%	2%	9%
MC-Info, 14 January 2012	12%	9%	13%	5%	49%	3%	2%	7%
Taloustutkimus, 5 January 2012	8.3%	7%	8,2%	4%	37%	1%	2%	4%
Research Insight Finland, 5 January 2012	8%	9%	11%	6%	41%	2%	1%	3%
TNS Gallup, 3 January 2012	7%	9%	9%	7%	38%	2%	2%	4%
MC-Info, 23 December 2011	9%	11%	11%	9%	51%	2.7%	2.5%	3.8%
TNS Gallup, 17 December 2011	6%	11%	9%	6%	43%	2%	4%	5%
Taloustutkimus, 15 December 2011	6%	7%	9%	5%	40%	2%	3%	3%
Research Insight Finland, 2 December 2011	6%	6%	7%	6%	43%	1%	3%	3%
TNS Gallup, 29 November 2011	5%	9%	8%	7%	41%	2%	3%	4%
Taloustutkimus, 18 November 2011	6%	8%	8%	7%	49%	1%	3%	3%
TNS Gallup, 15 November 2011	6%	11%	10%	7%	44%	1%	3%	3%
Research Insight Finland, 9 November 2011	6%	9%	6%	5%	47%	1%	2%	1%
TNS Gallup, 18 October 2011	6%	8%	6%	7%	50%	2%	3%	2%
Research Insight Finland, 1 October 2011	6%	11%	8%	11%	49%	1%	2%	2%
Taloustutkimus, 1 October 2011	6%	9%	6%	7%	62%		5%	3%
Taloustutkimus, 17 September 2011	6%	8%	8%	12%	54%		4%	4%
TNS Gallup, 29 August 2011	5%	6%		9%	49%			
Research Insight Finland, 17 August 2011	3%	7%	1%	12%	51%		1%	2%
Taloustutkimus, 3 August 2011	6%	11%			60%			4%
Taloustutkimus, 21 May 2011	3%	4%			45%			
Taloustutkimus, 30 April 2011		8%			56.8%			
Taloustutkimus, 2 December 2010	5%	11%			56%			3%
TNS Gallup, 8 August 2010	4%	9%			43%			3%
Taloustutkimus, 6 February 2010					45%			
Taloustutkimus, 21 January 2010			2%	4.0%	41.5%			
Taloustutkimus, 9 August 2009		3%	1%	3%	41%			
Taloustutkimus, January 2009		3.1%	1.1%	2.9%	44.3%		0.8%	
Research Insight Finland, 3 January 2009	<2%	6%		3%	32%			
Taloustutkimus, July 2008		2.7%		4.0%	37.3%		2.0%	
TNS Gallup, 21 June 2007		6%			32%		1%	

Note: the Taloustutkimus polls in 2011 before November as well as the MC-Info polls and TNS Gallup poll on 17 January omitted those interviewees who could not choose a candidate.

Second round

Poll source and date	2 Pekka Haavisto	6 Sauli Niinistö
Taloustutkimus, 2 February	38%	62%
Research Insight Finland, 1 February	37%	63%
TNS Gallup, 31 January	36%	64%
Research Insight Finland, 27 January 2012	36%	64%
MC-Info, 25 January 2012	35%	65%

== Results ==
Most popular candidate by constituency in the first round

Winning candidate by municipality in the first round: Sauli Niinistö: 25–30% 30–35% 35–40% 40–45% 45–50% 50–55% Paavo Väyrynen: 25–30% 30–35% 35–40% 40–45% 45–50% 50–55% 55–60% 60–65% 70–75% Eva Biaudet: 25–30% 30–35% 35–40% 40–45% 45–50%

The first round of the election was held in on 22 January, although 32.7% of eligible voters had cast their vote during the advance voting period between 11 and 17 January. The overall voter turnout in the first round was 72.8%. In the second round, 36.6% of votes were cast during the advance voting period between 25 and 31 January. The overall turnout in the second round was 68.9%.

Since no candidate received a majority of votes in the first round, a runoff election was held on 5 February between Sauli Niinistö (37.0% of first round votes) and Pekka Haavisto (18.8% of first round votes). Niinistö won the second round with 62.6% of the vote and was thus elected as president. The result of the second round was verified on 8 February.

Candidate	Party	First round		Second round	
Candidate	Party	Votes	%	Votes	%
Sauli Niinistö	National Coalition Party	1,131,254	36.96	1,802,328	62.59
Pekka Haavisto	Green League	574,275	18.76	1,077,425	37.41
Paavo Väyrynen	Centre Party	536,555	17.53		
Timo Soini	True Finns	287,571	9.40		
Paavo Lipponen	Social Democratic Party	205,111	6.70		
Paavo Arhinmäki	Left Alliance	167,663	5.48		
Eva Biaudet	Swedish People's Party	82,598	2.70		
Sari Essayah	Christian Democrats	75,744	2.47		
Total		3,060,771	100.00	2,879,753	100.00
Valid votes		3,060,771	99.69	2,879,753	99.13
Invalid/blank votes		9,658	0.31	25,133	0.87
Total votes		3,070,429	100.00	2,904,886	100.00
Registered voters/turnout		4,402,622	69.74	4,402,622	65.98
Source: Vaalit, Vaalit

=== Reactions ===
First round

Of the six candidates defeated on the first round, Väyrynen was the only one not to express his support for either of the second-round candidates. Soini and Essayah backed Niinistö, while Lipponen, Arhinmäki and Biaudet supported Haavisto.

Mikael Jungner, the party secretary of the Social Democratic Party, said that he would not continue in his role due to the poor showing of Lipponen.
