= 2011 Finnish parliamentary election =

- 17 April 2011

All 200 seats in Parliament 101 seats needed for a majority
- Registered: 4,387,701
- Turnout: 70.5% (▲5.5pp)
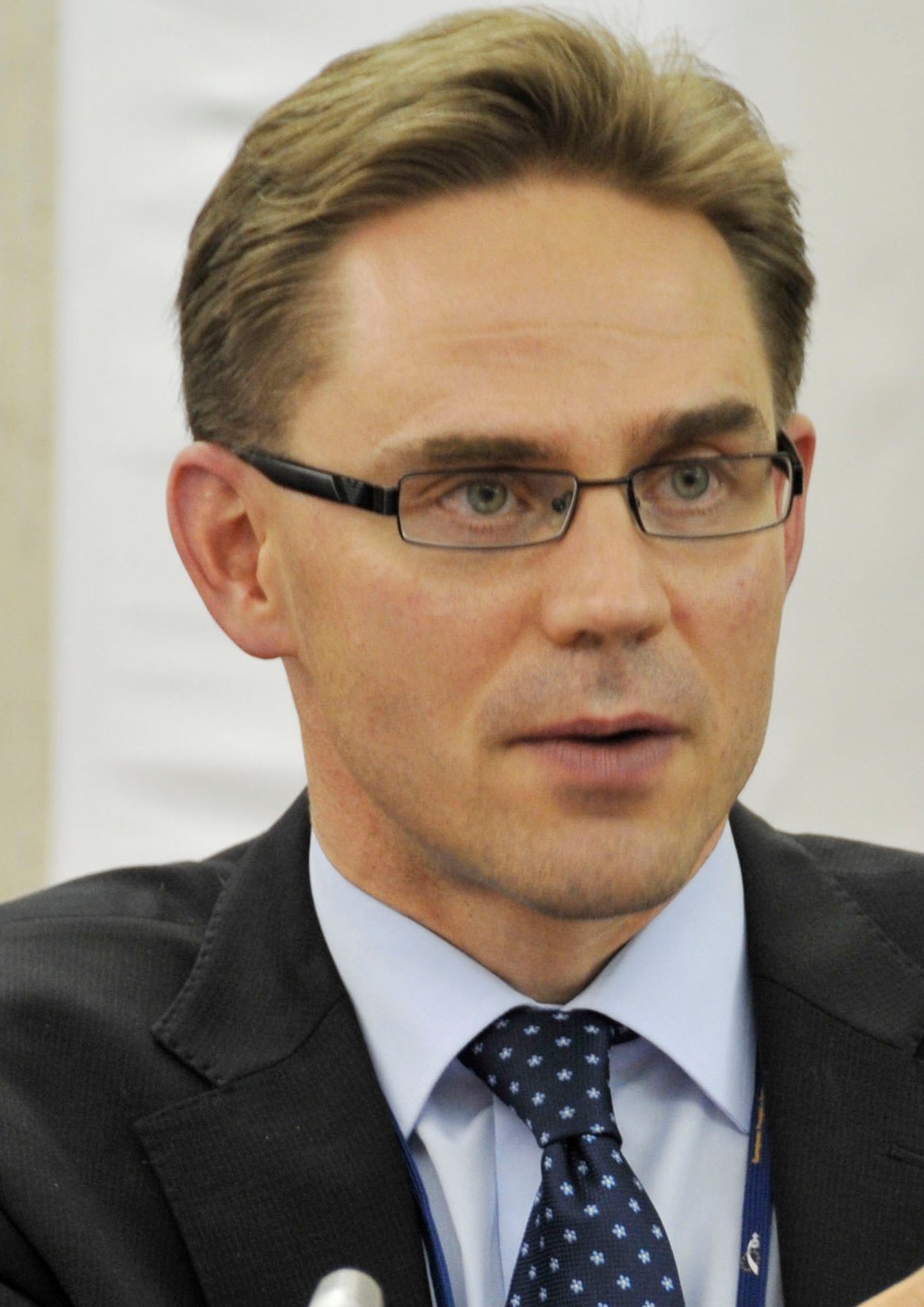

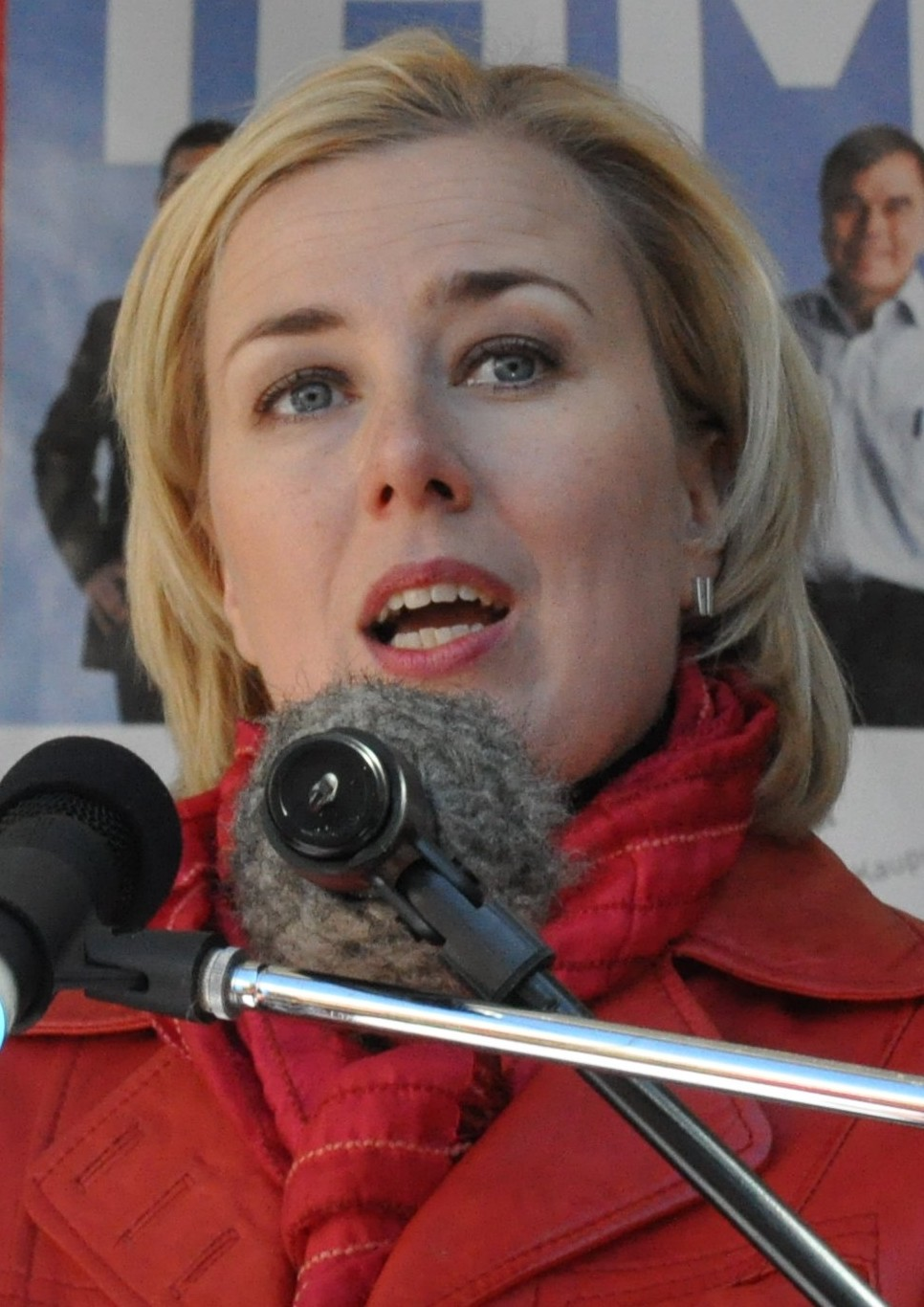

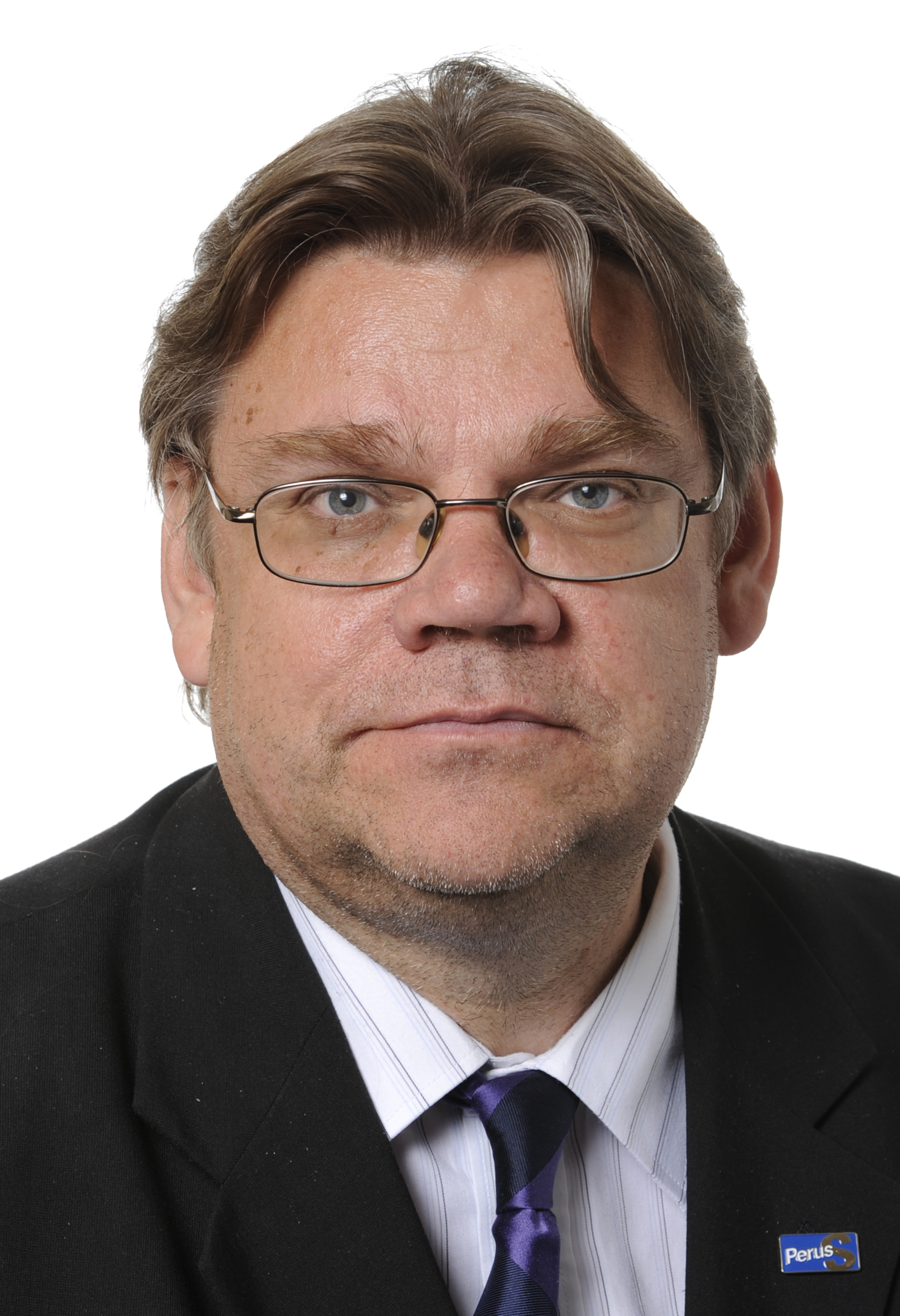

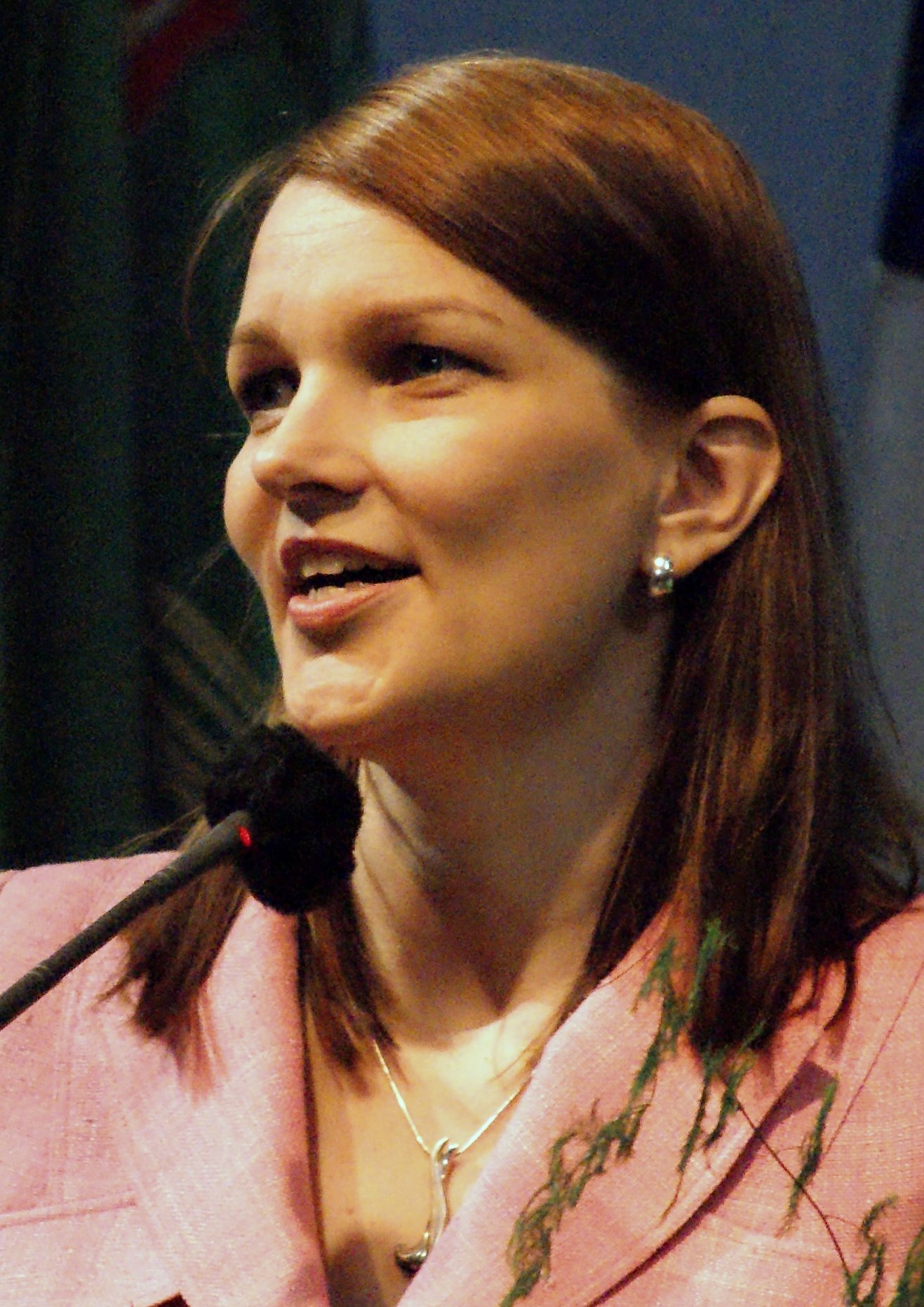

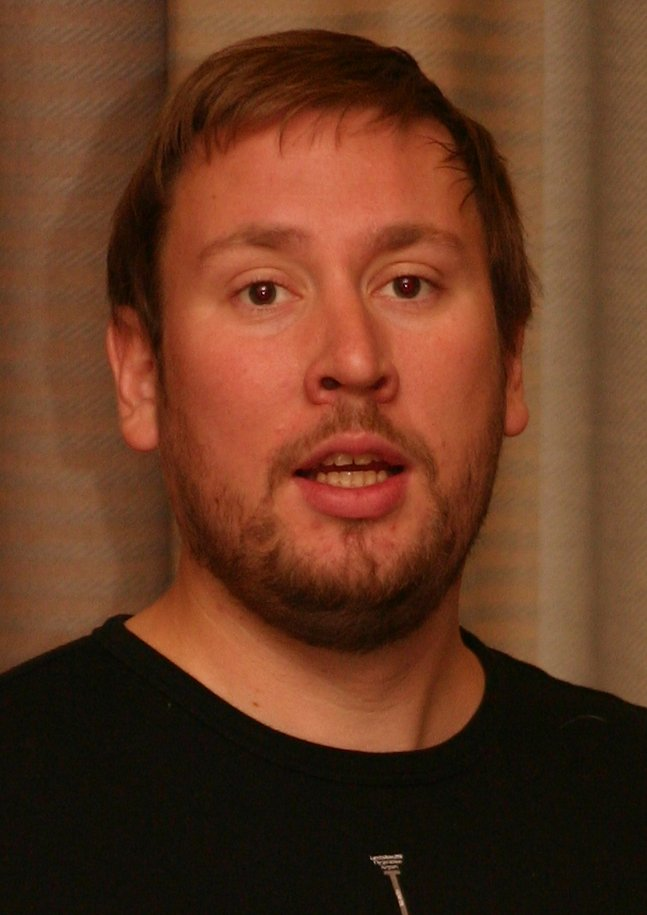

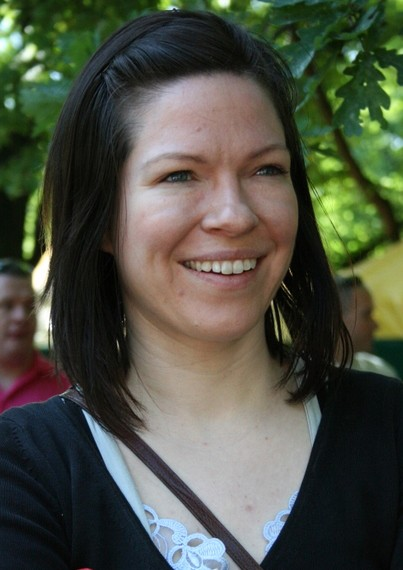

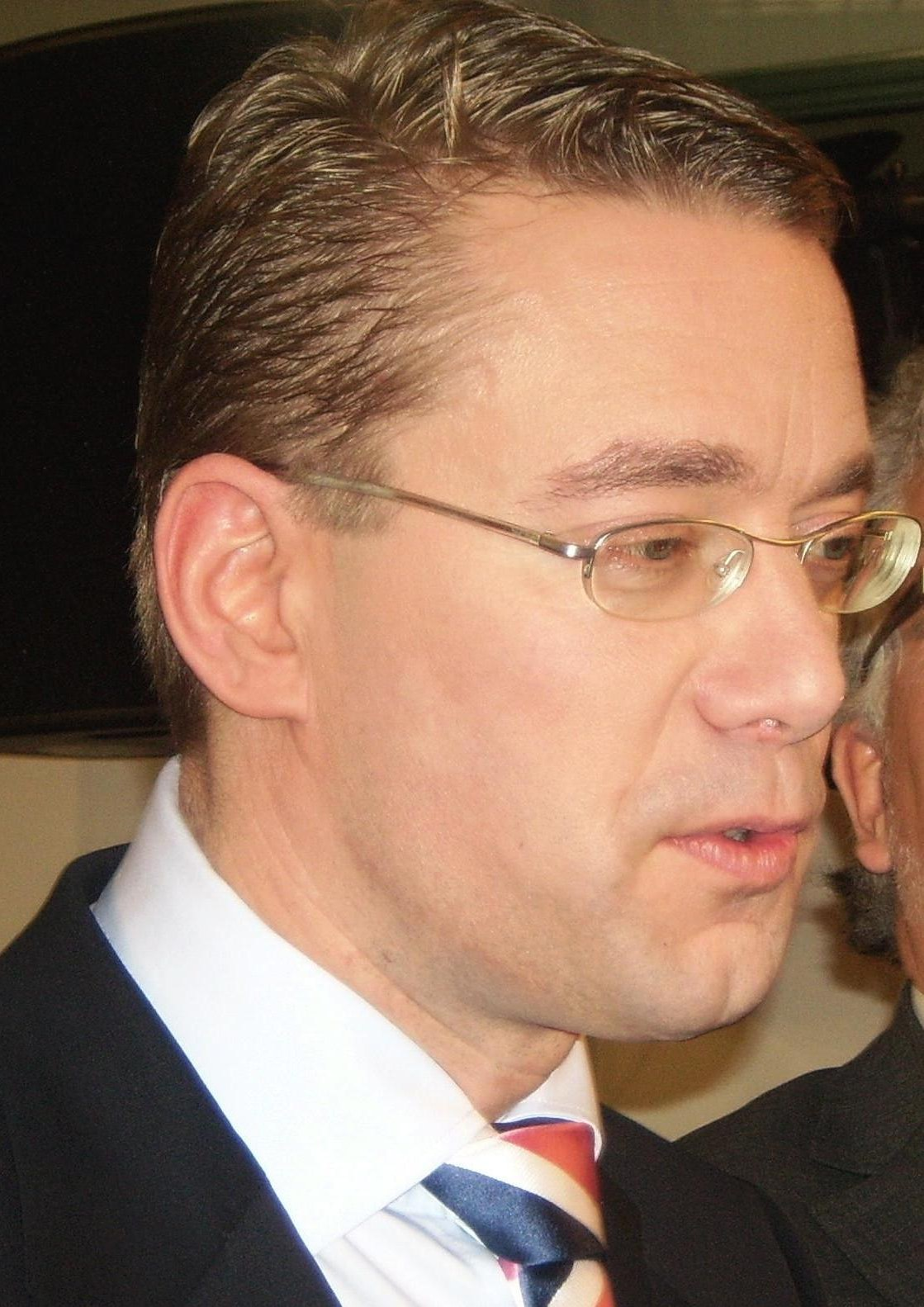

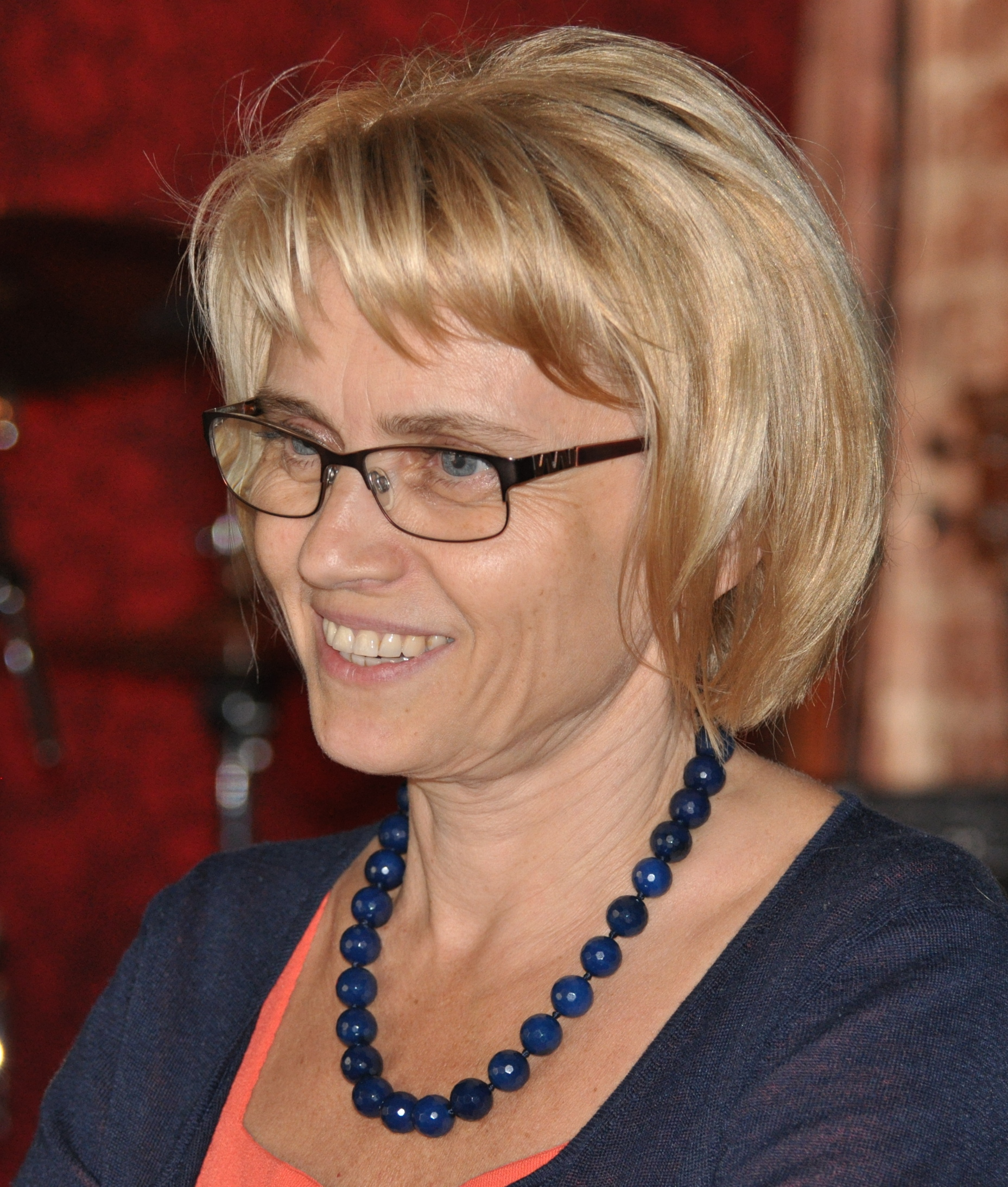
| | First party | Second party | Third party |
|---|---|---|---|
| Leader | Jyrki Katainen | Jutta Urpilainen | Timo Soini |
| Party | National Coalition | SDP | Finns |
| Last election | 22.26%, 50 seats | 21.44%, 45 seats | 4.05%, 5 seats |
| Seats won | 44 | 42 | 39 |
| Seat change | ▼6 | ▼3 | ▲34 |
| Popular vote | 599,138 | 561,558 | 560,075 |
| Percentage | 20.4% | 19.1% | 19.1% |
| Swing | ▼1.9pp | ▼2.3pp | ▲15.0pp |
| | Fourth party | Fifth party | Sixth party |
| Leader | Mari Kiviniemi | Paavo Arhinmäki | Anni Sinnemäki |
| Party | Centre | Left Alliance | Green |
| Last election | 23.11%, 51 seats, | 8.82%, 17 seats | 8.46%, 15 seats |
| Seats won | 35 | 14 | 10 |
| Seat change | ▼16 | ▼3 | ▼5 |
| Popular vote | 463,266 | 239,039 | 213,172 |
| Percentage | 15.8% | 8.1% | 7.3% |
| Swing | ▼7.3pp | ▼0.7pp | ▼1.2pp |
| | Seventh party | Eighth party |
| Leader | Stefan Wallin | Päivi Räsänen |
| Party | RKP | KD |
| Last election | 4.57%, 9 seats | 4.86%, 7 seats |
| Seats won | 9 | 6 |
| Seat change | Steady | ▼1 |
| Popular vote | 125,785 | 118,453 |
| Percentage | 4.3% | 4.0% |
| Swing | ▼0.3pp | ▼0.9pp |
- Results by constituency
Prime Minister before election
Mari Kiviniemi
Centre
Prime Minister after election
Jyrki Katainen
National Coalition

Parliamentary elections were held in Finland on 17 April 2011 after the termination of the previous parliamentary term. Advance voting, which included voting by Finnish expatriates, was held between 6 and 12 April with a turnout of 31.2%.

The importance of the election was magnified due to Finland's capacity to influence the European Union's decision in regard to affecting a bailout for Portugal via the European Financial Stability Facility, as part of financial support systems for countries affected by the euro area crisis, and the fall of the Portuguese government. Small differences in the opinion polls for the traditional three big parties (the National Coalition Party, the Centre Party and the Social Democratic Party) and the surprising rise in support for the True Finns also electrified the atmosphere ahead of the election.

The election resulted in a breakthrough for the populist True Finns, which came head-to-head with the three big parties, while every other parliamentary party in mainland Finland, excluding Åland, lost popularity. The National Coalition Party (NCP) also ended up as the biggest party for the first time in its history. The total turnout rose to 70.5% from 67.9% in the previous election; and corruption scandals also resulted in an anti-incumbency vote. The incumbent, Centre Party-led coalition, which included the NCP, Green League and Swedish People's Party (SPP), lost its majority by two seats and their Prime Minister Mari Kiviniemi of the Centre Party signaled that her party would then sit in opposition.

The incumbent Minister of Finance Jyrki Katainen, as the leader of the biggest party in the new parliament, was tasked to form a new government. During government formation talks, the True Finns said they would withdraw if the government accepted the Portuguese bailout. Katainen then continued six-party talks that included the NCP, the SDP, the Left Alliance, Green League, Christian Democrats and the SPP. However, these negotiations ran aground on 1 June as the Social Democrats and the Left Alliance walked out of the talks due to strong differences on economic policies. Negotiations were set to continue under Katainen's proposed premiership, though the composition of the new government was not certain at the time. Due to the Green League's opposition to forming a government with the NCP, the Centre Party and the Christian Democrats, Katainen—avoiding a resultant minority government—announced on 10 June that the same six parties would return to negotiations, describing it as the "only possible coalition." On 17 June, the six parties came to an agreement on forming a coalition government, led by Katainen and consisting of 19 ministers. The ministerial portfolios were divided with the NCP and the SDP both having six ministers, while the Left Alliance, the Greens and the SPP would each have two and the Christian Democrats would have one. The six parties announced their ministers designate between 17–20 June. On 22 June the new parliament elected Jyrki Katainen as prime minister.

== Background ==
In June 2010, then-Prime Minister of Finland and leader of the Centre Party Matti Vanhanen said that he would be stepping down from both positions. At a party conference held between 11 and 13 June, then-Minister for Public Administration and Local Government Mari Kiviniemi was elected the new party leader. Vanhanen stepped down from the position of the prime minister a few days later and was replaced by Kiviniemi, who became the second female prime minister in Finland's history.

The incumbent government was considering proposals for a new constitution, including a phrase in the first paragraph of the third clause that would have read "Finland is a member of the European Union." It was speculated that the incumbent government could finalise a new constitution before the election but the changes to the constitution would require the support of the next parliament in order to pass.

== Electoral system ==
The 200 members of the parliament are elected using the proportional D'Hondt method through which voters cast their vote for a candidate of their choosing within a party list. Electoral alliances between parties were allowed but were less common for the parliamentary parties in this election as the parties were preparing for future electoral reform that would not provide for electoral alliances.

In 2011 the country was divided into 15 electoral districts. (Åland is the only single member electoral district and it also has its own party system.) The electoral districts are shown below.

| Map | Electoral district | Seats |
|---|---|---|
| Electoral districts in the 2015 election | 01 Helsinki | 21 |
| Electoral districts in the 2015 election | 02 Uusimaa | 35 |
| Electoral districts in the 2015 election | 03 Finland Proper | 17 |
| Electoral districts in the 2015 election | 04 Satakunta | 9 |
| Electoral districts in the 2015 election | 05 Åland | 1 |
| Electoral districts in the 2015 election | 06 Häme | 14 |
| Electoral districts in the 2015 election | 07 Pirkanmaa | 18 |
| Electoral districts in the 2015 election | 08 Kymi | 12 |
| Electoral districts in the 2015 election | 09 South Savo | 6 |
| Electoral districts in the 2015 election | 10 North Savo | 9 |
| Electoral districts in the 2015 election | 11 North Karelia | 6 |
| Electoral districts in the 2015 election | 12 Vaasa | 17 |
| Electoral districts in the 2015 election | 13 Central Finland | 10 |
| Electoral districts in the 2015 election | 14 Oulu | 18 |
| Electoral districts in the 2015 election | 15 Lapland | 7 |

Following the problem-ridden limited electronic voting experiment of the 2008 municipal elections, the Ministry of Justice announced in January 2010 that there would be no electronic voting at this time, but that the ministry would be monitoring the international arenas for development of online voting.

=== Campaign funding ===
This was the first election since the Act on a Candidate's Election Funding came into force in May 2009, along with the 2010 amendments to the Act on Political Parties. Both laws mandate the disclosure of the sources of campaign finance and expenses. Every candidate and party as a whole must disclose their source of funding. Campaign funding may start six months before the election day and end two weeks after the election regardless of when the costs are actually paid. The candidates must file a public report with the National Audit Office detailing their sources of all contributions of over €1,500 in value raised in support of the election campaign. The funds include expenses from the candidate's own assets, loans taken out for the campaign, and contributions received by either the individual or by a group that supports the candidate. Candidates are barred from receiving anonymous contributions of over €1,500 in value.

== Retiring incumbents ==
Former Prime Minister Matti Vanhanen began to work as the Chief Executive of Finnish Family Firms Association and did not participate in the election.

The incumbent Speaker of Parliament Sauli Niinistö of the National Coalition Party did not run for parliament, despite receiving a record number of votes in the 2007 election. It was anticipated that he would be the National Coalition Party's presidential candidate in 2012; which he won. Overall there were 38 MPs not seeking re-election.

== Competing parties ==
At the time of the election there were 17 registered parties (a party has to collect signatures from at least 5,000 eligible voters in order to be accepted on the official party register, which is maintained by the Ministry of Justice). Eight of the parties were represented in the current parliament: the Centre Party, National Coalition Party (NCP), Social Democratic Party (SDP), Left Alliance, Green League, Swedish People's Party (SPP), Christian Democrats and True Finns. The MP representing Åland sits with the Swedish People's Party in the parliament.

Nine of the registered parties did not have representation in the parliament before or as a result of the elections: the Communist Party, Senior Citizens' Party, Communist Workers' Party – For Peace and Socialism, Workers Party, Independence Party, For the Poor, Pirate Party, Change 2011, and Freedom Party.

=== Party conferences ===
The Centre Party, the National Coalition Party, the Social Democratic Party and the Green League held party conferences in May or June 2010 where they elected the party leadership for the election and approved their election manifestoes. The Left Alliance held its conference in 2009, when they elected Paavo Arhinmäki chairman after the previous chairman resigned in 2009 due to the party's poor result in the European Parliament election.

Mari Kiviniemi was elected the new leader of the Centre Party in its conference in Lahti on 12 June. The support for the Centre Party has been significantly higher in northern Finland than elsewhere: in the 2007 election the party received over 43% of the votes in both Oulu and Lapland electoral districts, compared with its nationwide support of 23.1%, while in 2003 the party's vote share in the two northernmost districts was even higher) As the top spots of the party leadership went to members from southern Finland, many of their supporters in the northern part of the country felt disenchanted; one local party chief even warned that many northern Centre Party supporters might switch sides to the True Finns.

The National Coalition Party re-elected incumbent Minister of Finance Jyrki Katainen the party leader on 12 June, amidst protests by Greenpeace activists.

The Green League held its party conference between 22 and 23 May. The Greens emphasised the importance of the environment and set same-sex marriage and increasing foreign aid as the party's objectives.

== Campaign ==
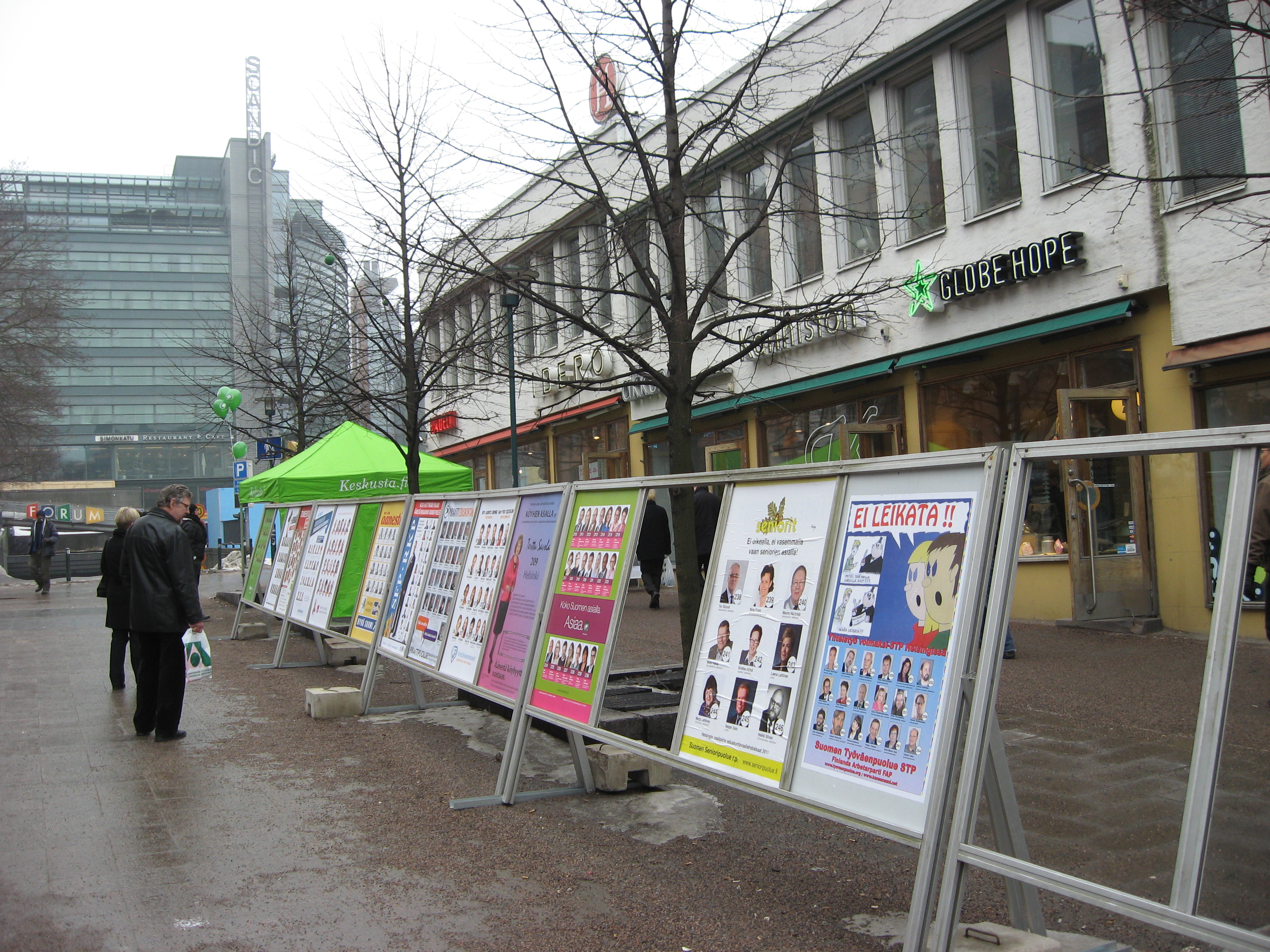
An official poster rack in central Helsinki displays the candidates and their assigned ballot numbers by party.

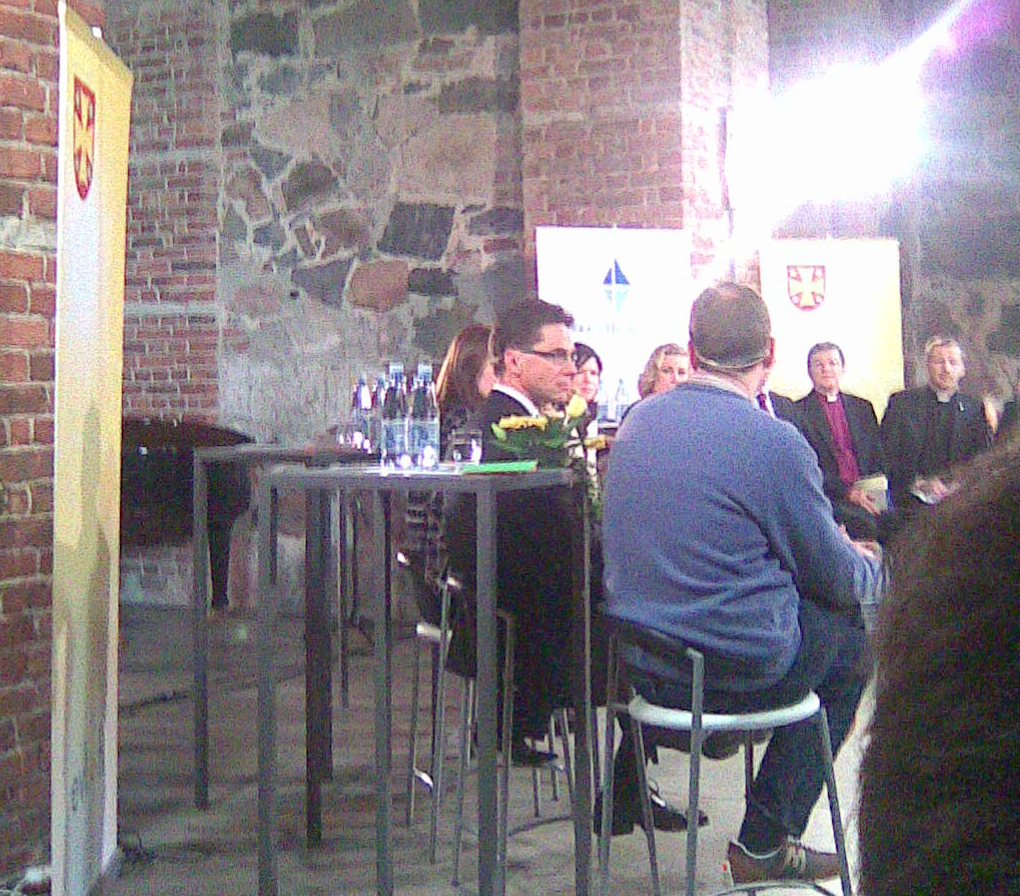
An election hustings event held by the Lutheran Church in the Helsinki Cathedral crypt.

In what was seen to have promoted anti-incumbency, a scandal regarding campaign finance followed allegation that the Centre Party's Timo Kalli's, who was also the head of the party's parliamentary group, admission in early May 2009 that he violated the law on reporting electoral campaign financing by not disclosing financial contributions he received for his election campaign during the previous election in 2007. When the media then delved further into the issue, stories started to emerge of common practice with a multitude of MPs not disclosing their financial benefactors, a practice which was not punishable under Finnish law. The media investigations focused on a group of entrepreneurs called Kehittyvien Maakuntien Suomi (Finland of Developing Provinces) who financed the electoral campaigns of numerous high-profile government and opposition candidates. Further investigations revealed that many recipients of their financial support did not register or even mention the amounts they received from the group. Then Prime Minister Matti Vanhanen was at the core of the accusations after the investigations showed he had also been among the beneficiaries of the groups' financing; this was despite one of the members of the group who had planned to build the biggest shopping mall in the country received Vanhanen's support for the plans against the grain of public opinion, thus eliciting accusations that he could have been influenced by the individual. Blame was also put on the Centre Party's secretary Jarmo Korhonen. This was said to have helped the True Finns.

The euro area crisis was another important issue in the election, even more so after Portugal applied for an EU bailout on 6 April, the first day of advance voting. According to an opinion poll nearly 60% of Finns were against Finland's participation in bailing out the crisis-ridden countries. All four parties of the governing coalition (Centre Party, National Coalition Party, Green League and the Swedish People's Party) support Finland's participation in the bailout and all four opposition parties (Social Democrats, Left Alliance, Christian Democrats and the True Finns) oppose such measures. The issue helped Soini become the most visible opposition leader. Soini then also stated that his party would not join in any coalition that supports guarantees to the crisis-ridden EU countries. He said that their crises are a consequence of the EU's failure. Finance Minister Jyrki Katainen had commented that a bailout for Portugal should only happen if the Portuguese parliament passed even tougher austerity measures than the failed programme that led to an early Portuguese election: "The package must be really strict because otherwise it doesn't make any sense. The package must be harder and more comprehensive than the one the parliament voted against." Despite his comments, the National Coalition Party believed the bailout to be in Finland's interests. It, along with the Centre Party, supported the bailout under the EU's auspices, while the True Finns and the Social Democrats were opposed to it. The True Finns said that Finnish taxpayers were being unjustly burdened by "squanderers" within the eurozone and pointed out that no one aided Finland during its own financial crisis in the 1990s. Helsingin Sanomat read the affair as having added "confusion" and complexity to the electoral race. The effect of the Finnish election on a possible EU bailout caused concern amongst to international investors as "it is a very distinct possibility that the next government and parliament of Finland will not want to agree to the things that the current government has signed up for, namely supporting Portugal and agreeing to the permanent and temporary crisis mechanisms," as there was said to be an "even chance" of Finland blocking a bailout for Portugal as its support was crucial because it would need the unanimous support of all national governments to pass. Finland's participation was further thrown in doubt as it was the only eurozone country to require parliamentary approval of any such measure. Should a new Finnish administration opt out of the bailout, this could throw into doubt the eurozone's capacity to maintain financial stability.

Yet another important issue during the campaign was that of the languages in the country. The status of the Swedish and Russian languages was a hot-button issue. A growing number of people believe that the Swedish language should be abolished as the country's second official language, as only a small percentage of the country use Swedish as their first language and that a large number of government officials do not use Swedish. A report by the Council of Europe stated that the Swedish language's status as Finland's second official language was in danger of being eroded in the longer term because of the officials' poor language skills and the lack of opportunities to study the language. However, the status of Russian was considered to be rising as several municipalities in eastern Finland sought to increase the role of the language at local schools. At the time, Swedish was spoken by 5.42% of the population as their mother tongue, with Russian spoken by 1.01% and the Sami languages spoken by 0.03%.

Furthermore, despite changes to the campaign finance laws, there was no perceptible decrease in campaigning activity. One reason was a compensatory expansion of advertising by way of internet search engines such as Facebook and other social media which were relatively inexpensive. Helsingin Sanomat called election workers in all electoral districts, excluding the Åland Islands, to ask for their assessments of the electoral campaigns. They reported that while the NCP's campaign was the most visible, the Centre Party and the Social Democrats also had high-profile campaigns with some variations across districts. The NCP were also said to be spending more of their own money than in the past.

=== Party-specific issues ===
==== Centre Party ====
The Centre Party has been the traditional party of rural voters, but according to polls, it had been losing support to the True Finns in its traditional stronghold regions. The party has traditionally had both a liberal and a conservative wing, however, with the leadership reshuffling in 2010, the central posts are now held by the liberal wing. The Centre Party has held the portfolio of the prime minister since 2003. According to opinion polls, Kiviniemi's personal support was higher than that of the party. She had also been campaigning as a staunch defender of Finland's participation in guarantees to the crisis-ridden EU countries.

==== Christian Democrats ====
The Christian Democrats, led by Päivi Räsänen, had announced that they would not support any governing coalition that plans on legalising same-sex marriage. Räsänen has also said that Christian refugees ought to be favoured in Finland's refugee policy on the grounds that they have better potential for successful integration to the society than refugees of other religions.

==== Green League ====
The Green League, which was part of the governing coalition, announced that it will not participate in any coalition that plans to give licences to new nuclear reactors.

The Green League also hosted members from the German Green Party; however, they did not partake in campaign events but instead were only present to learn about Finland's style of street campaigning.

==== Left Alliance ====
As a defender of high taxes, the Left Alliance's leader Paavo Arhinmäki has said that the party can be described as "supportive of income redistribution." The Left Alliance is critical of nuclear energy and is also against Finland's participation in the EU-sponsored Portuguese bailout.

==== National Coalition Party ====
Traditionally a pro-market economy and pro-EU centre-right party, the NCP were the largest party in the parliament for the first time in its history, though losing seats since the 2007 election. Although leading in the opinion polls for several years, it started to see some loss of support after the rise of the True Finns. Despite being founded as a primarily conservative party, an analysis on the party's programmes made by an NCP-affiliated think tank concluded that in the 2000s the liberal wing had gained the upper hand and had started to change the party's political ideology. At the party conference in 2010, the NCP delegates voted in favour of legalising same-sex marriage. The party's supporters are also generally very supportive of market economy, nuclear power and Finland's admission to the North Atlantic Treaty Organization.

Led by incumbent Minister of Finance Jyrki Katainen, the NCP has been strongly supportive of Finland's participation in EU bailouts with Katainen underlining the importance of what he calls "European responsibility." He also invited Swedish Prime Minister Fredrik Reinfeldt to observe the campaign, though Reinfeldt did not address a party rally. MP Ben Zyskowicz said that he could not estimate Reinfeldt's effect on voters.

==== Social Democratic Party ====
Polls concerning preference for the favourite candidate for Prime Minister indicated that SDP leader Jutta Urpilainen did not enjoy the support of everyone in her party. Urpilainen herself has denied claims of a leadership crisis.

In early April, the new leader of the Swedish Social Democrats, Håkan Juholt, visited Finland in order to show support for the SDP in the election. The party also invited other foreign politicians and ministers for a campaign rally in the week before the election. Liisa Jaakonsaari, an SDP MEP, justified this by saying that it was a tradition to invite colleagues from other states. The party's main guest was the German chairman of the Progressive Alliance of Socialists and Democrats in the European Parliament Martin Schulz. In the interim, the party also invited Swedish Social Democrat Marita Ulvskog who echoed the view that "investors and banks need to take responsibility." Former Prime Minister Paavo Lipponen was also present; he praised the EU and EMU and said that Finland is in a "psychological and moral slump." Following a recent election of his own, the leader of the Estonian Social Democratic Party Sven Mikser and MEP Ivari Padar traveled to campaign rallies in Helsinki and Espoo on 11 April to show support for their "sister party's field campaign." Mikser said that the "Social Democrats recently garnered a strong vote in Estonia and are clearly on the rise. Now we need the same to happen in Finland." Padar also said that because of the rise of anti-EU parties in both Finland and other countries: "That is why I personally consider it important to explain to the Finnish people that Europe should not be feared. Since Estonia and Finland are the only Nordic countries in the Eurozone, we need to have [a] strong partnership in the region."

==== Swedish People's Party ====
The Swedish People's Party of Finland (SPP) is the dominant party amongst Swedish-speaking voters; a poll has indicated that 75% of them support the party. Led by Stefan Wallin, the party is resolute on preserving the mandatory teaching of Swedish in schools. The SPP also wants to preserve the current immigration laws, which were passed on the initiative of incumbent Minister of Migration Astrid Thors, a member of the SPP.

==== True Finns ====
True Finns have said that Finland should not financially support the European Financial Stability Facility that led to bailouts for Ireland and Greece. Timo Soini asked: "How come they (the European Union) can't see the euro doesn't work?" The party manifesto said that they would support a capital gains tax increase from 28% to 30% and an increased tax on alcohol. The party also opposed mention of Finland's EU membership in the constitution and want to cut social welfare for immigrants. Soini also suggested Finland should unilaterally withdraw from the European Union Emission Trading Scheme and some other international commitments and that giving up the euro was an option. While speculating about a possible ministerial portfolio he later backed down on commitments when journalists asked him if the issues would be True Finns' demands in any possible government formation talks, citing the proposals as his personal opinion and not necessarily incorporated into a prospective government policy programme. He continued to maintain that the EU membership issue in the constitution would be a threshold for their participation in government formation talks. Helsingin Sanomat suggested that these demands could prove detrimental to a chance for True Finns to join a governing coalition. The True Finns also support the continuation of social welfare benefits. The party's support for the benefits along with its stance on the EU bailouts was also seen as one reason for its growth in popularity at a time when the country was facing welfare cuts by the government. The True Finns' vice-chairman Vesa-Matti Saarakkala said that "the True Finns will not participate in a coalition government with any party ready to give further loan guarantees". This stance on the EU's bailout was read by The Wall Street Journal as detrimental to the euro zone's attempt to reassure bond investors that it would not face debt problems. It also said that a good showing for the True Finns could threaten Portugal's EU-sponsored bailout.

Incumbent Prime Minister Kiviniemi said that she was ready to work with any party in Finland. When pressed by the media she said that she would not rule out working with the True Finns pending cooperation on negotiating a government platform. The True Finns and the Green League have both confirmed that the two parties are ideologically too far from each other to sit in the same coalition. The True Finns' main campaign issues—lowering refugee quotas and cutting foreign aid and Finland's financial contribution to the EU—were seen as a possible hindrance to coalition talks.

=== Debates ===
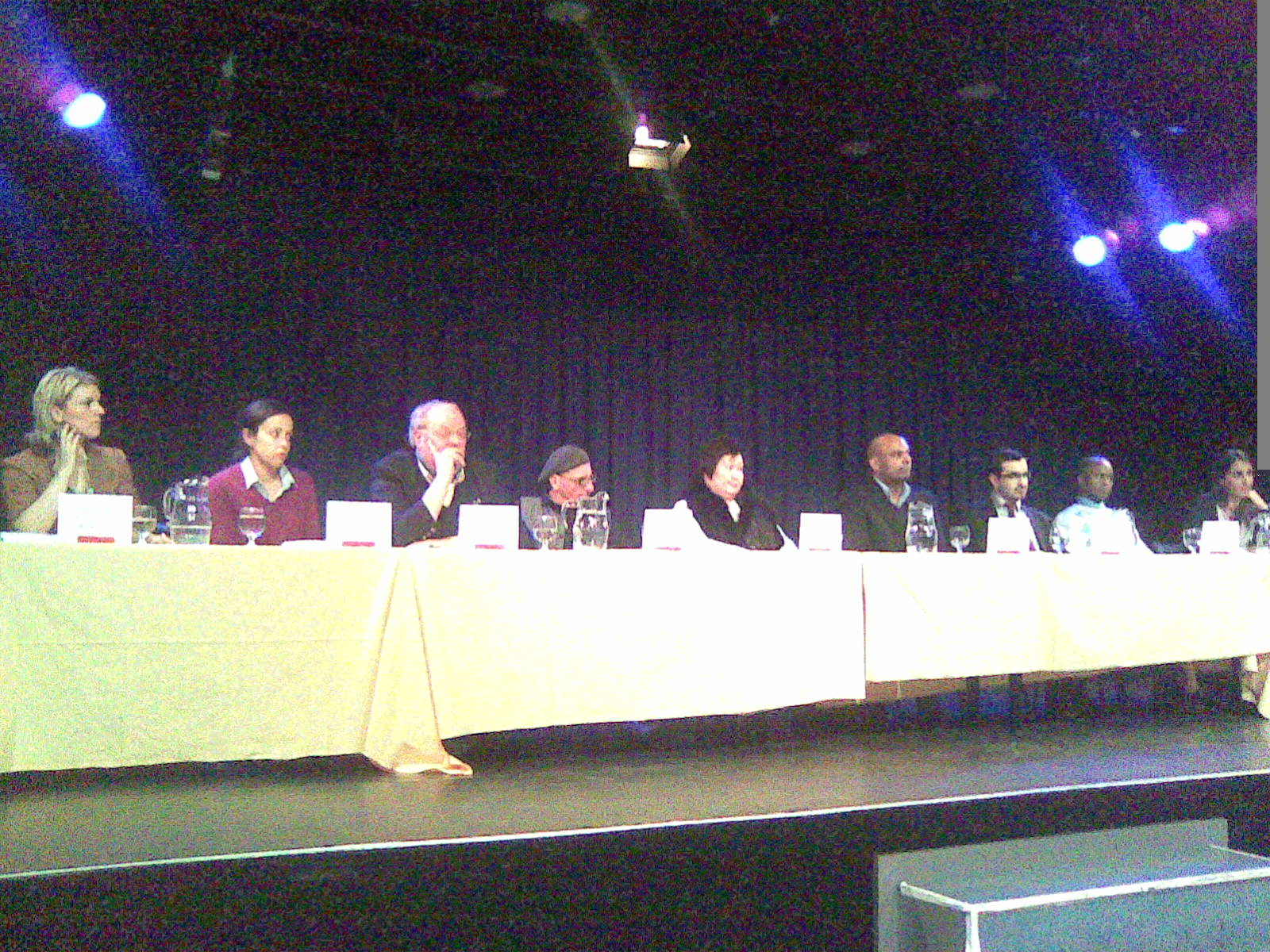
A hustings event in Caisa cultural centre, Helsinki, for the election.

In February the three biggest parties partook in a debate organised by the Finnish Business and Policy Forum in front of an audience consisting of people from the field of business. The National Coalition's Katainen said that as a result of February polling there were now four prime ministerial candidates from the four largest parties. However, the True Finns' chairman and MEP Timo Soini was excluded because the various pollings presented at the time were different. All parties insisted that the retirement age must not be lowered from 63. The SDP's Urpilainen said that the party would continue with what they said was a need to cut pensions and that increasing the retirement age is a form of cutting pensions; to support this she pointed out an earlier retirement age law of 65 years and that the age had been lowered. She also added that because of a large proportion of disabled pensioners, younger people should join the workforce quickly after graduation. Katainen and the Centre Party's Kiviniemi said they would consider raising the retirement age to lengthen work careers. Kiviniemi said that "some of the directors of our large corporations are retiring at the age of 59–60" and that, at the same time, "demands are being presented that people should work longer." Urpilainen also said that lowering the value added tax on food was mistake, though she said that it should not be raised either.

The first televised prime ministerial debate was organised by the state-owned broadcaster Finnish Broadcasting Company on 31 March in Tampere and included the chairpersons of the four parties leading in the opinion polls. The euro area crisis featured prominently in the debate; the leaders of the governing coalition, Katainen and Kiviniemi, defended Finland's participation in guaranteeing the loans to crisis-ridden EU countries claiming that Finland would otherwise risk plunging into a new recession as the country is dependent on exports to other European countries. As the chairpersons of the leading opposition parties, Soini and Urpilainen denied this claim and insisted that the debt-ridden countries should rather be allowed to go into their own debt restructuring. Urpilainen was not entirely against emergency measures aimed at saving these countries, but insisted that the major European banks ought to play a larger role in the guarantees. Soini continued his criticism of the euro, reiterating that no referendum was ever called on the currency union – he remained steadfast on his party's opposition to Finland guaranteeing the loans and presented the upcoming election as a referendum on the issue. On other economic issues, Kiviniemi continued to insist that spending cuts are not necessary in the following years – a claim repudiated by the other party leaders. Urpilainen and, initially, also Katainen were willing to make cuts on military spending; Soini, however, contested the cut but was instead ready to cut development aid and immigration-related expenses.

On 6 April, the television station MTV3 organised a debate for all the incumbent parties represented in the parliament. On the question of Finland's participation in NATO operations in Libya during the 2011 Libyan civil war, Soini, saying "Finland should not be taken into wars," was accompanied by the Left Alliance's leader Paavo Arhinmäki on disagreeing with the other party leaders' stance on supporting Finland's participation. All the opposition parties criticised the government's tax policies which they claimed were aiming towards the establishment of a flat tax. On the question of energy policy, the chairpersons of the NCP, True Finns and SPP were in favour of building more nuclear energy on the grounds of achieving energy self-sufficiency. Jyrki Katainen said that "we need to decide to either import nuclear energy from Russia or produce it ourselves" and Soini pointed out that the steel industry does not get along with mere wind energy,— while the leaders of the other five parties were against it, with some preferring instead to build more renewable energy infrastructure. Anni Sinnemäki of the Green League said that "not all renewable energy is expensive" and Urpilainen insisted that after the summer 2010 decisions to give licences for two nuclear plants, a halt was needed for reconsideration in any decision to further nuclear projects. Stefan Wallin of the SPP was the only party leader willing to force municipalities to take in the refugees allocated to them.

On 13 April, MTV3 organised another debate, which featured the same four party chairpersons as the debate by the Finnish Broadcasting Company two weeks earlier; Katainen, Kiviniemi, Urpilainen and Soini. The party leaders reiterated their stances regarding the EU-sponsored Portuguese bailout; Katainen and Kiviniemi were in favour of it, insisting that the bailout is necessary in order to assure the stability of the European economy and thus in the interest of Finland. Urpilainen and Soini were against the bailout, with Urpilainen demanding more responsibility from banks and investors and Soini repeating his stance that the eurozone cannot possibly function properly with countries like Portugal and Greece as members. Soini also criticised the governing parties for using scare tactics in the form of threatening Finns with rising unemployment if the bailout fails to pass. On other issues, Katainen, as he had stated earlier, willing to consider raising the minimum retirement age, while Urpilainen announced that the SDP would not join any coalition that does so. Katainen was the only party leader in favour of Finland's admission to NATO. However, even he said that the admission does not seem possible during the next four years as the majority of Finns are against NATO membership.

The second televised debate organised by the Finnish Broadcasting Company on 14 April was the last before the election and it included all the eight parliamentary parties. The economy was a dominant theme of the debate. Jutta Urpilainen reiterated her claim that the incumbent government was furthering the establishment of a flat tax. She also accused the government for advancing the interests of the richest percentage at the expense of the poor people. Jyrki Katainen denied the claims, but the two main governing coalition parties, the NCP and the Centre Party, were the only parties opposed to increasing welfare for the unemployed. Prime Minister Mari Kiviniemi of the Centre Party had previously been quiet on spending cuts, but when pressed on the issue by the debate's moderator she was rather indiscreet on cutting funding for the public sector and the Defence Forces. However, she still insisted that cuts may not be necessary if the economic growth is sufficiently high in the following years. Cuts on defence spending were supported by most parties, but Timo Soini contested this by saying that national security can not depend on economic conjectures. The crisis concerning the breaches against the campaign funding laws during the previous electoral campaign in 2007 was also discussed. Kiviniemi admitted that mistakes had been made. Soini called the mishandling an example of corruption and was glad that it was exposed. Kiviniemi discreetly said to Soini that the press had written about events in Soini's party as well. Soini's reply to this was: "The press? Your people are on trial!"

=== Controversies ===
During the night between Sunday 10 and Monday 11 April animal rights activists opposing fur farming systematically sabotaged a large number of the Centre Party's electoral billboards in Helsinki and Turku. The billboards, featuring a portrait of incumbent Prime Minister Kiviniemi, were replaced with similar-looking posters featuring a blood-mouthed Kiviniemi and a text that read "Do you want to close the animals in small cages? – I do as well." Kiviniemi was known for having received support from fur industry. In a comment to the Finnish Broadcasting Company, Secretary of the Centre Party Timo Laaninen condemned the action as "a serious violation of the democratic order that would be met with harsh countermeasures", as volunteers hoped to restore the billboards by the morning of 13 April. In an official statement, Minister of Justice Tuija Brax of the Green League condemned the acts of vandalism as both alarming and illegal and urged citizens to report all vandalism to the authorities so as to allow the parties to replace the boards and bring the culprits to justice. Other parties also joined the Centre Party's concern that election billboards were being repeatedly vandalised, bringing unwelcome expenses especially for the smaller parties. The Centre Party lodged an official complaint against the vandalism with the police. A police investigation has been launched into the incident.

Some campaigning by party workers of the True Finns caused controversy over the nature of their actions. Most complaints emanated from the Helsinki region. Jussi Saramo of the Left Alliance in the Uusimaa electoral district said of their actions that "[ever since] I have been involved in politics for 12 years and I have never seen such excesses." This followed an event in Korso in Vantaa where he parked his campaign trailer in a spot the True Finns said was reserved for party chairman Timo Soini. True Finns' candidate Mika Niikko however said those involved in the spat were no longer working for his campaign and he apologised to Saramo despite maintaining his stance that the placement of the trailer was a deliberate provocation: "I do not approve of being provoked when someone tries to provoke;" he also added that the volunteers working for the True Finns campaign come "from here and there" and it was not possible to verify everyone beforehand. He further added a claim that True Finns supporters have also been targets of aggressive behaviour. "A month ago we were not verbally abused, but now you can hear all kinds of language." The Social Democrats' foreign-born candidate Ranbir Sodhi was allegedly confronted by True Finns supporters in the Myyrmäki district of Vantaa who were said to have told him to go back "to his own country" where he could become a politician. A week after the confrontations, however, he said that "the same guys came to Tikkurila to apologise." The National Coalition Party MP Raija Vahasalo also complained that during a campaign event in Kirkkonummi the True Finns handed out leaflets at the same time that claimed she favoured Swedish-speaking residents in allocating local school funding. The action was due to two local members of the True Finns who are not running to become MPs. The chairman of Kirkkonummi True Finns and a candidate in the election Pekka Sinisalo said he confiscated the remainder of the leaflets. "I do not approve of attacking Vahasalo’s person. Election fever sometimes leads to these kinds of excesses." This was controversial as negative campaigning is unusual in Finnish elections. In response to such actions the party secretaries of the largest political parties held a meeting to discuss certain ground rules for the rest of the campaign, however the True Finns' Ossi Sandvik could not make it.

== Opinion polls ==
Taloustutkimus carried out monthly telephone polls on party popularity for the Finnish Broadcasting Company. Since April 2007, the monthly sample size has varied between 2,900–3,900 with a margin of error of about ±1.8%. (Polling does not include Åland as it has its own party system.) However, there were also other less frequent opinion polls.

Most notably the True Finns saw a significant rise since the last election, becoming one of the top four parties. According to Taloustutkimus, the True Finns polled 6.4% in January 2010 and 17.2% in March 2011, while all the traditional top-three parties, the National Coalition Party, the Centre Party and the Social Democrats, lost popularity.

== Conduct ==
Largest party by municipality: National Coalition Party Social Democratic Party True Finns Centre Party Left Alliance Swedish People's Party Christian Democrats Åland Coalition

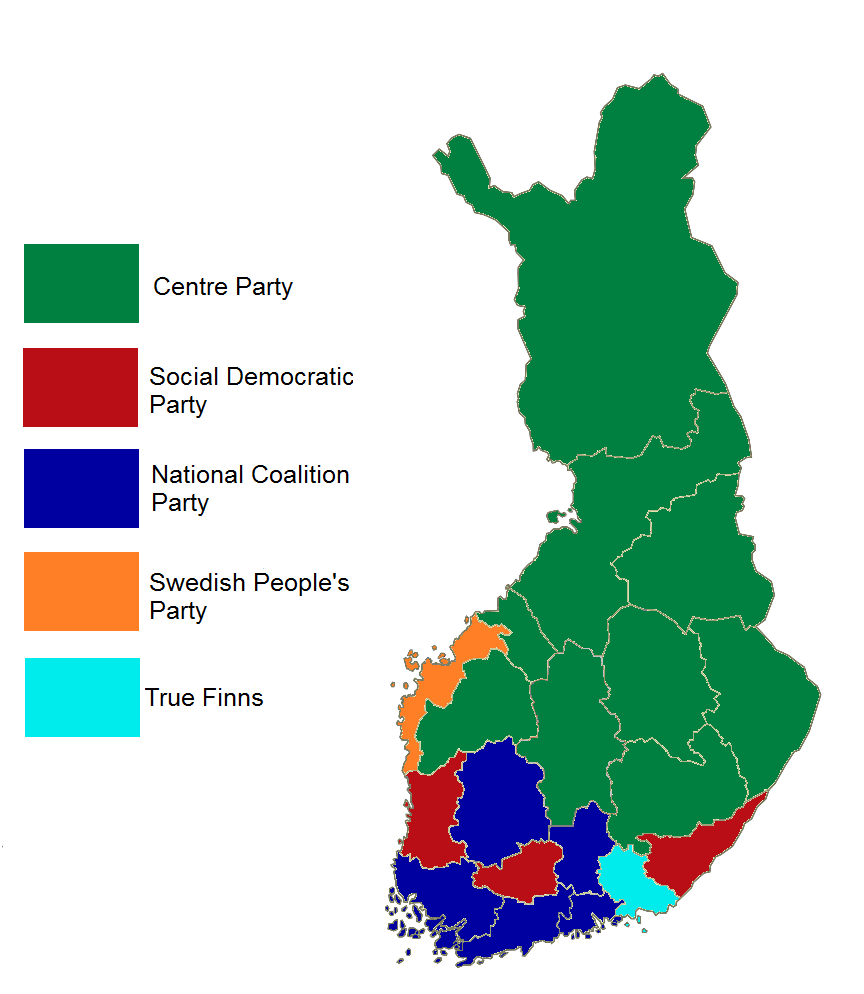
Largest party by province: Centre Party Social Democratic Party National Coalition Party Swedish People's Party True Finns

The election saw a substantial increase in international media coverage. Eighty foreign media representatives from a multitude of countries registered for an event at the Foreign Ministry held during the election weekend as it usually is. The journalists also got to ask questions to the representatives of the various political parties. As the results came in, the Foreign Ministry set up broadcast coverage with interpreters on hand. Notably, most journalists were interested in the True Finns and their background. The following day, the Foreign Ministry invited professor Jan Sundberg of the Department of Political and Economic Studies at the University of Helsinki to lead an analysis of the result. He was asked about the reasons for the True Finns' performance and the commonality with other European populist movements. There was also discussion about the possible composition of a new government and how the different parties could find common ground during talks on government formation. Sundberg said he believed an agreement could be found within the following few weeks.

=== Advance voting ===
At the end of the advance voting period, the total number of votes was 1,249,198, or 31.2% of the electorate, with more women voting. In the previous election, 29.2% voted in advance. Significantly, President Tarja Halonen voted during advance voting. However, there were some problems with expatriate voting as the embassy in Germany ran out of ballots on 9 April forcing an extension to 11 April. The expatriate vote was considerably higher than in the previous election, up from 8.6% in 2007 to 15%. The Foreign Ministry said that out of a total of 228,000 expatriates eligible to vote 35,049 cast their ballots at the Finnish diplomatic missions, which was up from 27,399.

Advance voting took place in 901 polling stations in the country. Expatriate voting took place between 6 and 9 April at 241 polling stations at embassies and consulates. One national electronic voter list was used for early voting; though for the 17 April poll, voters could only vote at their designated local polling station. The expatriate voter turnout in 91 countries rose by 2.2 % to a record-high 10.7%, with 35,000 people casting their votes. In addition, 400 Finns voted on ships at sea.

However, despite the large advance voting, the race was not considered to have ended because the undecided voters, whose impact was termed crucial, were still being targeted during the remaining few days. As parties and candidate issues were already known by most of the electorate, the remaining days were seen as important over "image and force of personality". Jan Sundberg said that "the more crisis [sic] out in the world, the better for the parties in opposition."

== Results ==
Anti-incumbency led to the defeat of 47 incumbent members of parliament, including the Minister for Foreign Trade and Development Paavo Väyrynen of the Centre Party and the Minister for Communication Suvi Lindén of the NCP. Among other notable MPs who failed to hold on to their seats were former Minister for Agriculture Juha Korkeaoja of the Centre Party, the vice-chairman of the Centre Party Timo Kaunisto and Marja Tiura of the NCP, who had been elected with the highest number of votes for a female candidate in the 2007 election.

The True Finns' Timo Soini got the most individual votes with 43,437, followed by incumbent Foreign Minister Alexander Stubb of the NCP with 41,768. The new parliament has 115 male MPs and 85 female MPs.

| Party | Votes | % | Seats | +/– |
|---|---|---|---|---|
| National Coalition Party | 599,138 | 20.38 | 44 | –6 |
| Social Democratic Party | 561,558 | 19.10 | 42 | –3 |
| True Finns | 560,075 | 19.05 | 39 | +34 |
| Centre Party | 463,266 | 15.76 | 35 | –16 |
| Left Alliance | 239,039 | 8.13 | 14 | –3 |
| Green League | 213,172 | 7.25 | 10 | –5 |
| Swedish People's Party | 125,785 | 4.28 | 9 | 0 |
| Christian Democrats | 118,453 | 4.03 | 6 | –1 |
| Pirate Party | 15,103 | 0.51 | 0 | New |
| Communist Party | 9,232 | 0.31 | 0 | 0 |
| Åland Coalition 2011 (C–Ob–S–ÅF) | 8,546 | 0.29 | 1 | 0 |
| Change 2011 | 7,504 | 0.26 | 0 | New |
| Freedom Party | 4,285 | 0.15 | 0 | New |
| Independence Party | 3,236 | 0.11 | 0 | 0 |
| Senior Citizens' Party of Finland | 3,195 | 0.11 | 0 | 0 |
| Alliance for Åland (L–M) | 1,957 | 0.07 | 0 | 0 |
| Workers' Party | 1,857 | 0.06 | 0 | 0 |
| Communist Workers' Party | 1,575 | 0.05 | 0 | 0 |
| For the Poor | 1,335 | 0.05 | 0 | 0 |
| Independents | 1,260 | 0.04 | 0 | 0 |
| Total | 2,939,571 | 100.00 | 200 | 0 |
| Valid votes | 2,939,571 | 99.45 | | |
| Invalid/blank votes | 16,294 | 0.55 | | |
| Total votes | 2,955,865 | 100.00 | | |
| Registered voters/turnout | 4,387,701 | 67.37 | | |
Source: Vaalit, ASUB, Ministry of Justice

In Åland, Elisabeth Nauclér was elected to represent the islands for Åland Coalition. In the parliament, Nauclér sits in the same group as the SPP.

Result by municipality for the four largest parties:

| National Coalition Party | Social Democratic Party | True Finns | Centre Party |

=== Reactions ===
==== Political ====
Domestic

The National Coalition Party's leader Jyrki Katainen said of potential government formation talks that "this is a challenging time but it is the politicians' job to solve problems", adding that "we will be fine." Alexander Stubb, the biggest individual winner of the party, said that "it will be very difficult to keep a party with 39 seats out of government." If able to find compromises, he believed the NCP can have the True Finns in the government. He also played down external fears of a government with the True Finns saying that "we Finns are very pragmatic and responsible." He also claimed that "80% of Finns voted in favour of Europe and in favour of bail-outs."

Despite the loss of votes the SPP retained their number of seats in parliament. Party chairman Stefan Wallin described the election result as "interesting."

Supranational bodies

- EU – An unnamed representative of the European Union said that the result "would not affect the bailout for Portugal." A spokesman said that: "There are no changes in plans. Negotiations are underway with Portugal. We're certainly not going to interfere with talks in Finland to form a new government. We're fully confident that member states will honour their commitments."

States

- Portugal – Former president Mario Soares wrote that Finland had become an "ultra-conservative" country. He also recalled his positive memories of the former Finnish Prime Minister Kalevi Sorsa and, in comparison, called those politicians that now wish to rule Finland "midgets," who he claimed are hostile toward Portugal.
- Sweden – Prime Minister Fredrik Reinfeldt congratulated Jyrki Katainen and called the National Coalition Party a sister party of the Swedish Moderate Party. However, Foreign Minister Carl Bildt was concerned that Finland might "turn its back" on both the Nordic countries and Europe, in referring to the True Finns' electoral success.
  - Jimmie Åkesson of the Sweden Democrats, coming off a surprising electoral result himself, called the result delightful and that his party has such common themes with the True Finns as criticism of the EU and immigration.
- UK – Nigel Farage of the United Kingdom Independence Party (UKIP) congratulated Timo Soini saying that he had proven the power of the eurosceptic movement (UKIP and the True Finns were both members of the Europe of Freedom and Democracy group in the European Parliament at the moment).

==== Economic ====
The euro fell against the US dollar for the two trading days preceding the vote on speculation that a win for the True Finns would hinder the prospects for the Portuguese bailout. Questions were raised whether the fall of the US dollar to a one-year low could be stemmed. The questions were partially answered on the last trading day before the election, when the dollar rose on concern for a shake-up for European confidence as a result of the election which caused bearish traders to cover their open positions. The strong showing by the True Finns and the Social Democrats caused EU leaders to worry that they may not be able to count on Finland's future support for any such bailout measure. Concerns for the euro grew in the run-up to the election and caused worry after the result. Eurozone stock markets were also upset and could be further upset as the bailout talks, expected to be concluded in mid-May, were affected. While there was no expectation that the bailout wound be derailed, "caution" was said to be the "watchword." The London Stock Exchange also considered the result a possible obstruction to the bailout.

==== Media ====
Helsingin Sanomat called the result "shocking" and "exceptional," as well terming the result a "protest vote." In an editorial on the day after the election, the newspaper wrote that, as the biggest winner of the election, the True Finns have both the right and the responsibility to go into a coalition government. However, it was uncertain on whether the party can reach a compromise with the National Coalition Party.

The international media also interpreted the result as a new government that could cause hurdles to the Portuguese bailout. The Financial Times and The Wall Street Journal wrote that the result of the election might complicate the realisation of the Portuguese bailout. The BBC described the result as "a tremor [that] hit the EU." An article in The Guardian pointed out that:

These electoral successes tap into the the [sic] complex politics of these countries. Viewed from afar, they are all open, successful, externally orientated. Seen from inside, they address a fear that things are not as they were, that a combination of immigration and membership of the European Union poses a challenge to the traditions of the Nordic way of life. In some way the fact that Finland has joined the EU demonstrates that the country is no longer just the small, poor, well-behaved neighbour of the Nordic block.

It gave two reasons for the populist surge across Europe: The "movements tap into a deep discontent with the mainstream parties in Europe's political systems. Every funding scandal, every politician found to be corrupt, adds more wind to these parties' sails. The European Union, lacking decisive leadership in times of financial difficulty, is an ideal further focus for this ire;" and that populist appeals rely on having "an enemy to hand. This enemy is anyone coming from the outside – immigrants. Anti-immigrant rhetoric is the only thing in common between the politics of these parties. More mainstream politicians such as David Cameron or Angela Merkel then start to adopt this rhetoric. Add to this the hurt inflicted on Europe's populations due to the financial crisis and stagnant growth, and populists have ready material with which to work." It postulated that a solution could lie with a "traditional approach", which the UK-based paper said was most effectively implemented by the group Hope Not Hate, though it only solved a part of the problem in "exposing the extremes of the populist parties". It added that more mainstream parties on both sides of the political spectrum need to change as well by ensuring high standards of propriety and ethics and by articulating what it termed "positive and optimistic economic and political solutions" rather than what it said was populist rhetoric.

=== Analysis ===
Risto Uimonen, an election analyst for the Finnish Broadcasting Company, predicted "the toughest negotiations on government formation since the 1970s", as the three biggest parties have differing stances on many issues. Some analysts said that government formation talks could take weeks or even months due to disparities on such issues as the eurozone bail-outs, taxation, pension reform, foreign aid and immigration. Pasi Saukkonen, a political scientist at the University of Helsinki, made a comparison between similar EU referendums in Denmark and Ireland (following which a similar referendum passed the measure, though it was in turn followed by a similar proposed measure) where the smaller EU member states wielded immense influence; though he said that such controversial matters usually work out in the end.

==== Centre Party ====
The party of incumbent Prime Minister Mari Kiviniemi suffered the heaviest defeat in the election. This was also the biggest loss in the party's history and the biggest loss for any party in the country's post-World War II history. The leader of the Centre Party Kiviniemi called the result "catastrophic" for her party and said that the party's immediate future would be in the opposition. The Centre Party's support was highest in the Oulu electoral district with 33.4% of the votes and lowest in the Helsinki electoral district with 4.5%.

==== Christian Democrats ====
The Christian Democrats' leader Päivi Räsänen considered the party's loss of one seat relatively small considering what she termed the "political storm" that had swept through Finland during the electoral campaign. Support for the Christian Democrats was highest in the Häme electoral district with 6.8% of the votes and lowest in the Lapland electoral district with 1.6% of the votes.

==== Green League ====
As a result of the Green League's loss of one third of their MPs, party leader Anni Sinnemäki said on the election evening that "the objectives and values advocated by the party had suffered a clear defeat". She added that the party would sit in the opposition. Sinnemäki was also considering her resignation from the head of the party. In the end, she did run for re-election, but placed only third as the party's members elected Ville Niinistö as the new chairman on 11 June. The Green League's support was highest in the Helsinki electoral district with 16.7% of the votes and lowest in the electoral district of Vaasa with 1.4%.

==== Left Alliance ====
Despite the Left Alliance's loss of seats, its chairman Paavo Arhinmäki was still reasonably satisfied with the party's performance in the election, due to his claims that the media had concentrated on the four major parties during the campaign. However, Arhinmäki got the most personal votes in his electoral district of Helsinki. The Left Alliance's support was highest in Lapland with 16.7% of the votes and lowest in South Savo with 2.2%.

==== National Coalition Party ====
Despite a loss in support, the NCP became the largest party in the parliament for the first time in its history. The NCP's support was highest in Uusimaa with 28.4% of the votes and lowest in North Karelia with 10.5% of the votes.

==== Social Democratic Party ====
Although the SDP's number of seats was lower than ever with the exception of the 1962 election, party leader Jutta Urpilainen was proud of her party finishing second in the election after placing third in the previous election. The SDP's support was highest in North Karelia with 26.4% of the votes and lowest in the electoral district of Oulu with 11% of the votes.

==== Swedish People's Party ====
The SPP's support was highest in the Vaasa electoral district with 19.4% of the votes and lowest in the Oulu electoral district with 0.2% of the votes. However, the party was the only one that did not field candidates in all electoral districts.

==== True Finns ====
The True Finns gained the highest support in their electoral history; and the rise of 15% was also the largest electoral victory for any party in Finland's post-war history. Their support was highest in Satakunta with 23.6% of the votes and lowest in Helsinki with 13% of the votes. Their rise was said to be because of being a "one-man party" led by Soini's "verbal acuity and political agility" that resulted in the "closest thing to a landslide victory obtainable in Finland's multiparty politics." With the exception of Helsinki, the support for True Finns was spread out evenly across the country. The party enjoyed strongest support in the municipality of Kihniö, where the party received an absolute majority of votes with 53.2%—largely due to Lea Mäkipää who gained 665 votes, nearly 50% of all the votes cast. Four members of Suomen Sisu were elected to the Eduskunta as True Finns MPs (Jussi Halla-aho, Juho Eerola, James Hirvisaari, Olli Immonen).

=== By region ===
| Province | National Coalition | Social Democratic | Finns | Centre | Left Alliance | Green League | Swedish People's | Christian League | Pirate Party | Communist | Change 2011 | VP | Independence Party | Senior Citizens Party | Workers Party | KTP | For the Poor | Other | Electorate | Votes | Valid votes | Invalid votes |
|---|---|---|---|---|---|---|---|---|---|---|---|---|---|---|---|---|---|---|---|---|---|---|
| South Savo | 11,778 | 19,988 | 17,107 | 22,351 | 1,851 | 5,914 | 0 | 3,754 | 248 | 74 | 111 | 36 | 159 | 0 | 33 | 29 | 0 | 0 | 129,734 | 84,030 | 83,433 | 597 |
| North Savo | 21,531 | 24,055 | 27,296 | 33,295 | 11,042 | 7,201 | 0 | 5,142 | 0 | 411 | 506 | 176 | 171 | 0 | 72 | 59 | 132 | 104 | 204,759 | 131,916 | 131,193 | 723 |
| North Karelia | 9,118 | 22,996 | 20,155 | 22,804 | 3,650 | 4,724 | 0 | 2,458 | 306 | 286 | 245 | 105 | 88 | 0 | 15 | 25 | 0 | 109 | 136,898 | 87,552 | 87,084 | 468 |
| Kainuu | 4,178 | 4,193 | 9,476 | 13,171 | 8,775 | 856 | 25 | 1,141 | 118 | 83 | 51 | 94 | 27 | 0 | 3 | 23 | 90 | 43 | 68,566 | 42,585 | 42,347 | 238 |
| Uusimaa | 229,637 | 149,634 | 131,451 | 44,627 | 59,814 | 100,391 | 48,747 | 21,481 | 6,051 | 3,126 | 2,215 | 117 | 1,054 | 826 | 1,093 | 564 | 956 | 464 | 1,146,795 | 806,729 | 802,248 | 4,481 |
| Eastern Uusimaa | 8,973 | 8,869 | 8,742 | 3,620 | 2,324 | 3,407 | 13,668 | 1,070 | 218 | 116 | 66 | 14 | 76 | 0 | 57 | 44 | 40 | 101 | 75,120 | 51,713 | 51,405 | 308 |
| Southwest Finland | 59,690 | 50,844 | 46,916 | 30,039 | 24,955 | 19,000 | 14,286 | 7,609 | 1,673 | 873 | 1,330 | 1,575 | 271 | 149 | 158 | 79 | 0 | 161 | 380,259 | 261,031 | 259,608 | 1,423 |
| Kanta-Häme | 20,356 | 24,972 | 17,210 | 14,276 | 7,324 | 4,229 | 0 | 5,534 | 547 | 204 | 176 | 84 | 37 | 74 | 29 | 98 | 0 | 13 | 140,191 | 95,917 | 95,163 | 754 |
| Päijät-Häme | 25,176 | 23,940 | 24,628 | 12,549 | 6,595 | 4,923 | 0 | 8,180 | 530 | 509 | 200 | 22 | 72 | 261 | 43 | 58 | 0 | 48 | 166,009 | 108,473 | 107,734 | 739 |
| Kymenlaakso | 17,206 | 22,669 | 24,389 | 13,497 | 7,495 | 4,009 | 0 | 6,550 | 206 | 0 | 179 | 81 | 127 | 0 | 63 | 54 | 0 | 0 | 150,940 | 97,250 | 96,525 | 725 |
| South Karelia | 13,111 | 18,875 | 14,938 | 14,973 | 2,223 | 3,095 | 0 | 4,563 | 170 | 0 | 285 | 67 | 92 | 0 | 43 | 49 | 0 | 0 | 111,228 | 72,944 | 72,484 | 460 |
| Central Finland | 22,248 | 31,433 | 26,828 | 32,435 | 13,283 | 9,604 | 0 | 9,563 | 1,245 | 801 | 214 | 35 | 121 | 424 | 37 | 35 | 0 | 0 | 224,150 | 149,127 | 148,306 | 821 |
| Southern Ostrobothnia | 21,484 | 12,669 | 23,677 | 38,051 | 2,833 | 1,480 | 239 | 6,586 | 254 | 66 | 44 | 34 | 376 | 224 | 15 | 30 | 0 | 13 | 158,346 | 108,602 | 108,075 | 527 |
| Ostrobothnia | 10,528 | 15,688 | 11,683 | 5,991 | 4,999 | 1,357 | 45,504 | 6,738 | 277 | 135 | 45 | 22 | 97 | 210 | 15 | 11 | 0 | 169 | 152,510 | 103,975 | 103,469 | 506 |
| Satakunta | 22,132 | 30,295 | 29,822 | 20,324 | 13,775 | 4,827 | 0 | 4,304 | 0 | 128 | 163 | 44 | 169 | 0 | 36 | 64 | 0 | 0 | 188,146 | 126,801 | 126,083 | 718 |
| Pirkanmaa | 61,002 | 59,164 | 57,798 | 28,575 | 22,795 | 22,654 | 0 | 13,647 | 2,568 | 2,008 | 690 | 1,519 | 190 | 1,004 | 94 | 103 | 0 | 0 | 397,186 | 275,231 | 273,811 | 1,420 |
| Central Ostrobothnia | 3,070 | 6,387 | 7,313 | 12,336 | 1,480 | 705 | 2,554 | 3,007 | 93 | 38 | 24 | 55 | 100 | 11 | 6 | 4 | 0 | 7 | 56,407 | 37,404 | 37,190 | 214 |
| Northern Ostrobothnia | 24,699 | 22,652 | 39,595 | 68,245 | 26,647 | 11,057 | 420 | 5,554 | 660 | 253 | 812 | 133 | 162 | 0 | 38 | 114 | 108 | 13 | 310,720 | 202,134 | 201,162 | 972 |
| Lapland | 12,453 | 11,726 | 20,320 | 32,006 | 16,613 | 3,404 | 422 | 1,633 | 0 | 264 | 124 | 53 | 0 | 0 | 24 | 235 | 0 | 0 | 163,623 | 100,051 | 99,277 | 774 |
| Åland | 0 | 0 | 0 | 0 | 0 | 0 | 0 | 0 | 0 | 0 | 0 | 0 | 0 | 0 | 0 | 0 | 0 | 10,497 | 26,114 | 10,754 | 10,497 | 257 |
Source: European Election Database

== Government formation ==
As the leader of the NCP, the largest party in parliament, Jyrki Katainen was tasked with forming a new coalition government. He said that the result of the election supported a coalition consisting of the three largest parties, i.e. the National Coalition, the Social Democratic Party and the True Finns. The most problematic question was believed to be the EU bailout policy, where the True Finns most differ from the other parties. Formal negotiations on government formation started after 24 April and the Kiviniemi government submitted its resignation on 29 April, starting to serve as a caretaker government until a new one was formed.

On 12 May, the True Finns announced that they would withdraw from the government formation negotiations due to the bailout issue. Soini said he would remain true to the True Finns' campaign promises and not compromise the party's core principles. After Soini's announcement, Jyrki Katainen invited the SDP, Green League, SPP and Christian Democrats to negotiate on forming a coalition led by the NCP. On 18 May, Katainen announced that he would invite the Left Alliance to negotiate as well, beginning on 20 May. The Left Alliance's participation had been demanded by the Social Democrats.

On 17 June, the six parties came to an agreement on forming a coalition government. The Katainen government had 19 ministers with the portfolios divided with the NCP and the SDP both having six ministers, while the Left Alliance, the Greens and the SPP would each have two ministers and the Christian Democrats would have one. The NCP, SDP, SPP and the Christian Democrats announced their candidates for minister positions on 18 June, while the Left Alliance—with some of its notable members opposing joining the government—confirmed its participation in the government and its candidates for ministerial portfolios on its party council on 19 June. The Green League announced its ministers on 20 June. On 22 June, the parliament elected Katainen as prime minister by a vote of 118–72; two Left Alliance MPs voted against Katainen, for which they were formally reprimanded by the Left Alliance parliamentary group. President Tarja Halonen then formally inaugurated the government at the government palace in Helsinki the same afternoon.
