= Terttu Savola =

Finnish politician

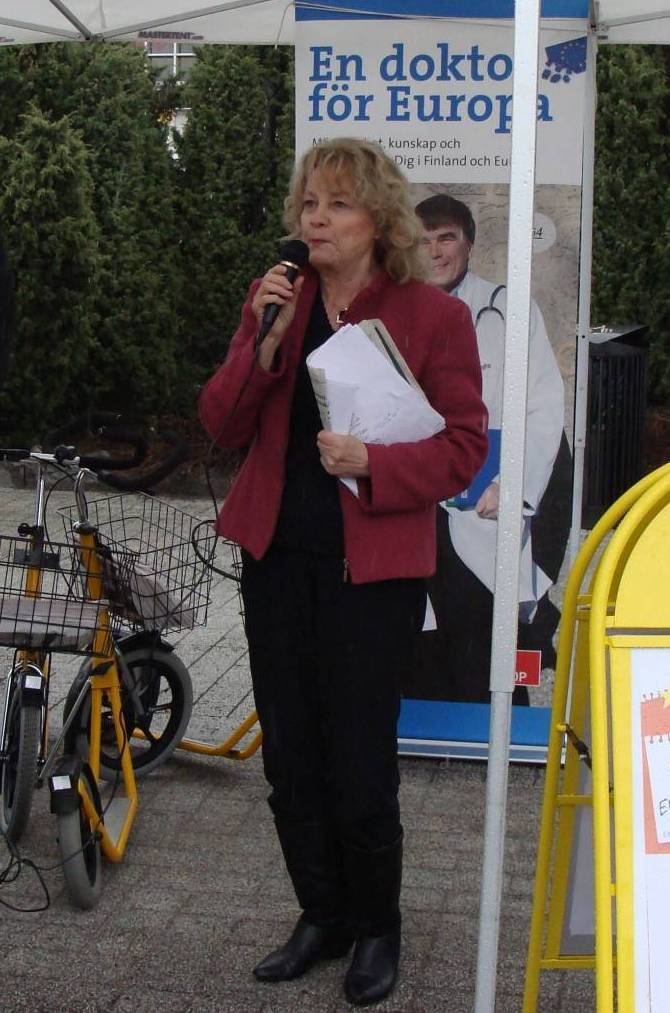
Terttu Savola in Espoonlahti in May 2009

Terttu Savola (née Rankila, born 22 June 1941) is a Finnish politician. She is the chairperson of the For the Poor party, a member of the council of the city of Espoo, the ambassador for human rights and children's rights in the Finnish United Nations alliance, and a lecturer in the Finnish Refugee Help Association.

== Life and career ==
Savola was born in Vimpeli In the early 1990s, she belonged to the council of the Christian Democratic Party and was the chairperson of the party's women association. In November 1995, Savola attended the founding conference of the True Finns party, where she was elected as the party's deputy chairperson. Savola only resigned from the Christian Democratic Party after her election as deputy chairman of the True Finns. In the June 1997 party conference, Savola lost her place as deputy chairperson. She still remained a member of the party council. In early 1998, Savola resigned from the True Finns and joined the Remonttiryhmä ("Renovation Group") party. In October 1998, Savola was elected to lead the party's women association Naisremmi ("Band of women"). Savola was fired from the Remonttiryhmä party in spring 1999, when she accused the party chairman Risto Kuisma of being too authoritative.

Savola was elected to the city council of Espoo in the 2008 municipal elections and the party For the Poor received its first council seat in its entire history. The cause for this was an electoral alliance with the True Finns. Timo Soini's huge popularity also brought Savola, who had received 176 votes, to the city council.

Savola was a candidate for the European Parliament in 1996 (839 votes), in 2004 (1352 votes) and in 2009 (385 votes) In the 1994 presidential election, Savola supported Elisabeth Rehn of the Swedish People's Party of Finland, and in the 2006 Finnish presidential election she supported Sauli Niinistö of the National Coalition Party.

Savola was arrested on election day of the 2011 parliamentary elections, when she sought an interview with the chairmen of the YLE, MTV3 and STT parliamentary parties. The editorial in Helsingin Sanomat condemned the arrest and compared it to the election events in Belarus.

Savola planned to run for president in the 2012 election, but the party did not have time to collect enough supporter cards by the deadline.

Savola is the editor of the Plari newspaper published by the Southern Ostrobothnians in Helsinki. She is also a former model.
