= Ilkka Kantola =

Finnish politician (born 1957)

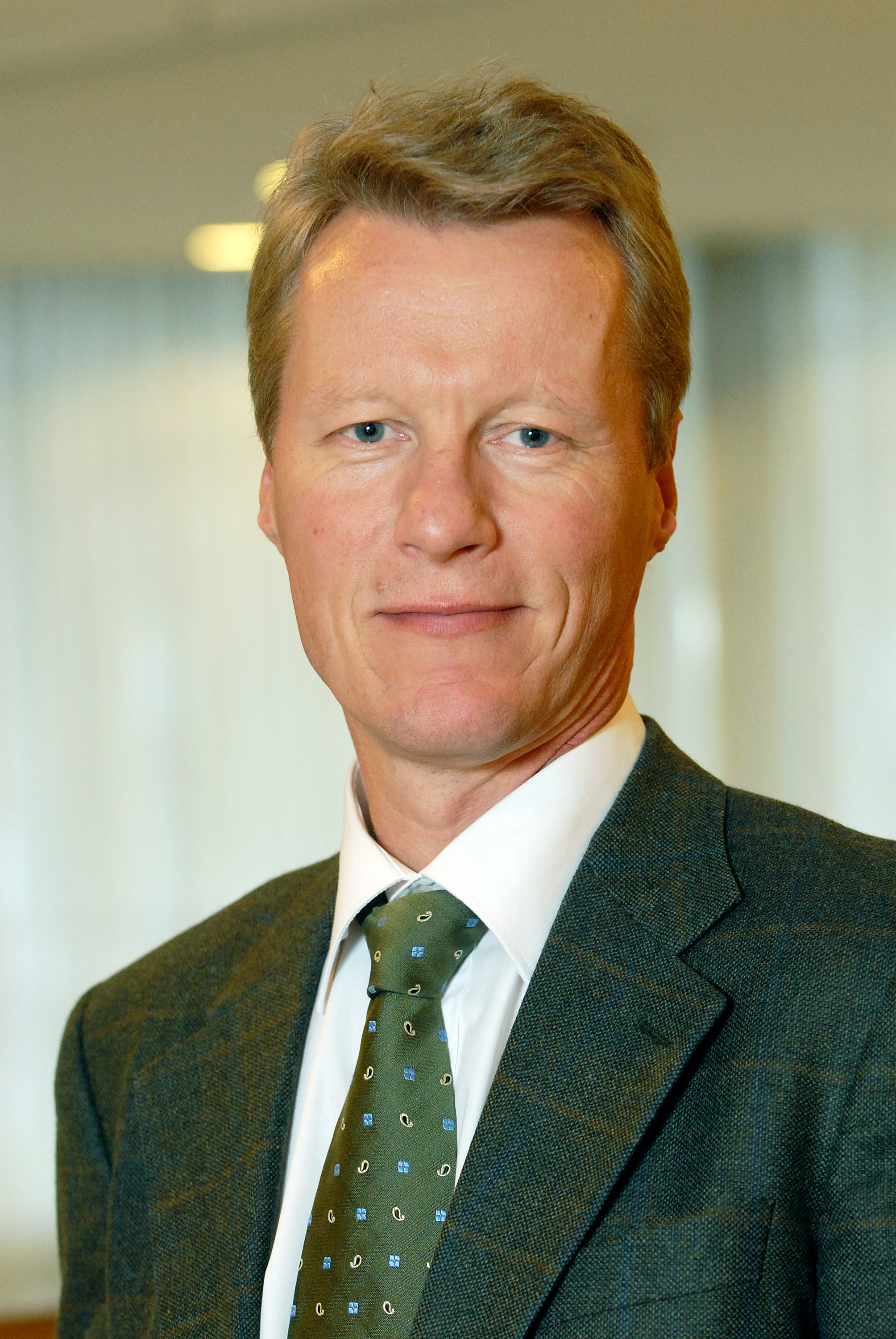
Ilkka Kantola

Ilkka Tapani Kantola (born 17 March 1957) is a Finnish politician and Lutheran minister. He has been a Social Democratic member of the Parliament of Finland since 2007. Previously he served as Bishop of Turku.

== Life ==
Kantola was born in Rymättylä, Finland. He graduated as Doctor of Theology from the University of Helsinki in 1994. He served as General Secretary of the Archdiocese of Turku from 1994 to 1998 and then as Bishop of the Archdiocese. In 2005 Kantola resigned after it was revealed that he had an extramarital affair with a married female minister. This was the first time when a Bishop of the Lutheran Church of Finland resigned prematurely.

In 2007, Kantola was elected to the Parliament of Finland from the electoral district of Finland Proper. Next year he was elected to the City Council of Turku. He has been twice re-elected to both the Parliament and the City Council. From 2011 to 2015, he chaired the Administrative Council of the Finnish Broadcasting Company (Yle). Kantola is currently member of the Constitutional Law Committee and Education and Culture Committee of the Parliament.

== Electoral history ==
=== Parliamentary elections ===
Year	Electoral district	Votes	Result
2007	Finland Proper	5,091	Elected
2011	Finland Proper	6,339	Elected
2015	Finland Proper	5,908	Elected

=== Municipal elections ===
Year	Municipality	Votes	Result
2008	Turku	1,680	Elected
2012	Turku	675	Elected
2017	Turku	621	Elected

Religious titles
First	Bishop of Turku; 1998 – 2005	Succeeded by Kari Mäkinen
