= Ossi Sandvik =

Member of Jalasjärvi Municipal Council
- In office 2008–2016
- In office 1993–1996

Party Secretary of True Finns Party
- In office 2007–2013

Personal details
- Born: Jalasjärvi
- Party: Finns Party
- Occupation: Party secretary

Ossi Sandvik (born 16 April 1953) is a Finns Party politician, who served as the party secretary from 2007 to 2013. He previously worked as a parliamentary assistant for the member of the parliament Raimo Vistbacka and had also been the district secretary of the South Ostrobothnian district of the Finns Party. Ossi Sandvik is from the same rural municipality as the former prime minister Mari Kiviniemi, Jalasjärvi, but from a different village. Ossi Sandvik is from Luopajärvi.

Sandvik was elected as one of the five Finns Party members of the municipal council of Jalasjärvi in 2008 and was reelected in 2012. The previous time he was the member of the council was 1993–1996.
