= For the Poor =

Political party in Finland

For the Poor Köyhien Asialla (Finnish)
- Leader: Terttu Savola
- Founded: November 2002
- Dissolved: 2015 (de facto)
- Ideology: Christian socialism Christian values
- Political position: Centre-left
- Religion: Christianity

Website
- www.koyhienasialla.fi

For the Poor (Finnish: Köyhien Asialla) was a Finnish political party, not situated anywhere on the traditional political map. It was founded in November 2002. The party was one of the smallest in Finland, as it never had any seats in either the Parliament of Finland or the European Parliament, and only ever held one municipal council seat in the city council of Espoo (2008–2012).

The party was removed from the official party register in May 2007 after going through two consecutive parliamentary elections without winning a single seat. The party returned to the register in 2008. In the municipal elections in 2008, the party chairperson Terttu Savola was elected to the city council of Espoo. The party was de-registered again in 2015.

The chairperson Terttu Savola gathered the required five thousand supporter cards by herself. Before forming a party of her own, Savola was a member of the Christian Democrats, the Finns Party, and Reform Group.

In its political programs for municipal elections, the party described itself as being founded on Christian values. It was considered Christian socialist and positioned left-of-centre.

== Elections ==
The party For the Poor participated in the Finnish parliamentary elections, the European Union parliamentary elections and the regional council elections in Kainuu.

In the parliamentary elections of 2003 the party only registered candidates in the Uusimaa electoral district, where the 26 candidates of the party gathered a total of 0.3% of the votes. In the parliamentary elections of 2007 the party had a total of 10 candidates from the electoral districts of Helsinki, Lapland, Oulu, Northern Savonia and Uusimaa. In the Helsinki and Oulu districts the party had an alliance with the Christian Democrats. In Lapland the party had an alliance with the True Finns and the Independence Party, in Northern Savonia only with the Independence Party.

In the European Union parliamentary elections of 2004 the party registered a full number of 20 candidates. The party's electoral themes included stopping the European Union from becoming a union state and the introduction of the Tobin tax. The party also participated in the Finnish elections for the European Parliament in summer 2009.

In the municipal elections of 2004, For the Poor registered a total of 11 candidates in Helsinki, Suomussalmi and Vantaa. The chairperson Terttu Savola was among the list of Independents in Espoo candidates. None of the candidates were elected. The party was denied access to the Yleisradio electoral debate, and it filed a complaint about discrimination to the justice representative. In the 2008 elections the party had 18 candidates in three municipalities. Savola was elected to the city council of Espoo. The success was due to an alliance with the True Finns. The huge popularity of Timo Soini also brought Savola to the council, although For the Poor only received 0.3% of the vote. In the 2006 presidential election chairperson Savola supported Sauli Niinistö. The incumbent president Tarja Halonen did not, according to Savola, adequately address the plight of the Finnish poor. However, Savola did make it clear that the party members can freely choose their own candidates.

In the Kainuu regional elections For the Poor received 45 votes (0.1%) in 2004 and 30 votes (0.1%) in 2008.
