= Independents in Espoo =

Finnish political party

Independents in Espoo (in Finnish: Espoon Sitoutumattomat, in Swedish: De Obundna i Esbo) is a local political party in the municipality of Espoo, Finland. In the 2004 municipal elections the party got 4360 votes (4.3%). It got three seats in the municipal council, Timo Soini (1484 personal preference votes), Kurt Byman (360 votes) and Heidi Mikkola (317 votes).
