= Eero Lehti =

Finnish businessman (born 1944)

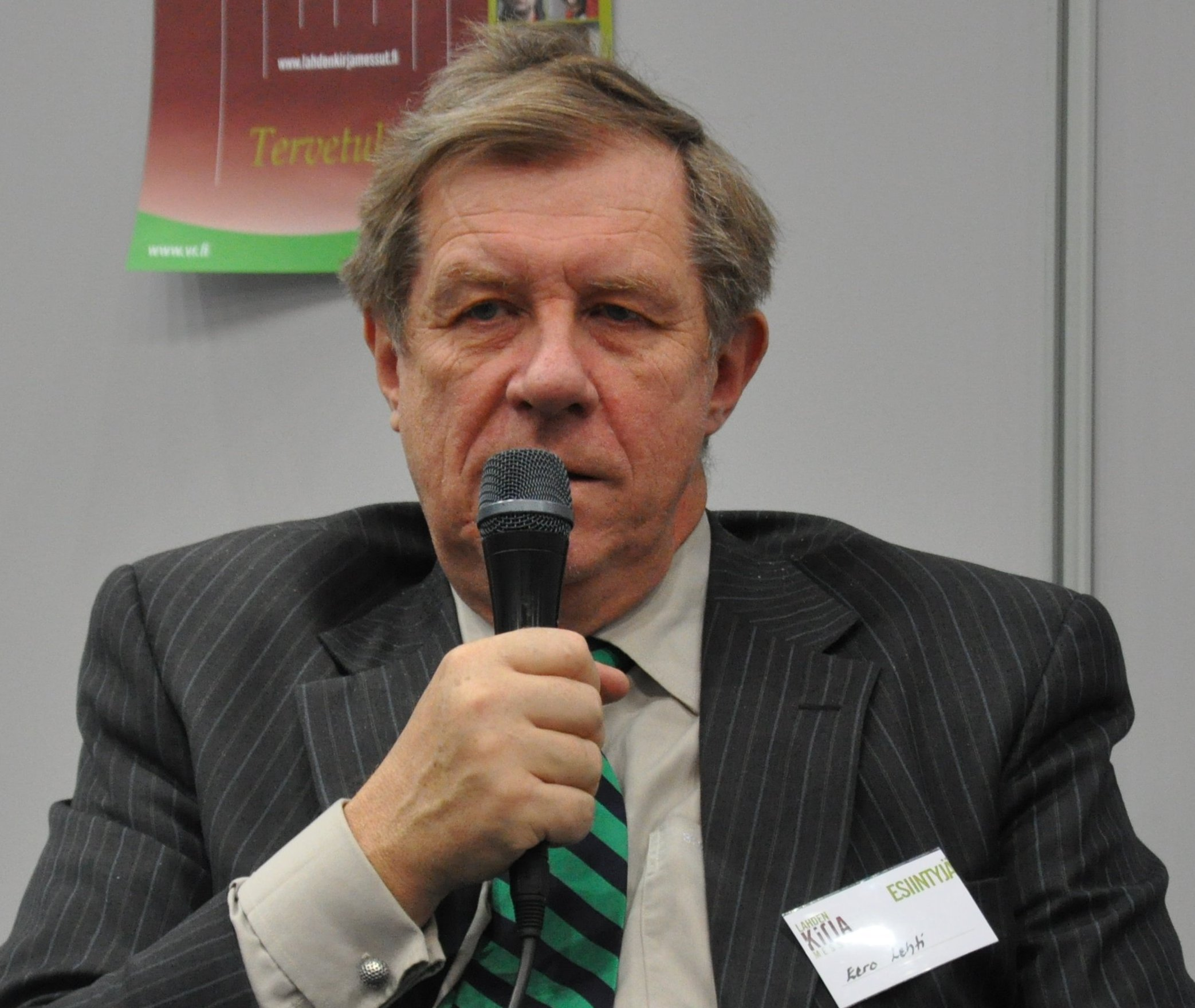
Eero Lehti (2009)

Eero Heikki Lehti (born 23 August 1944 in Tuusula, Finland) is a Finnish businessman, the chairman of the city council of Kerava, and was a member of the Finnish parliament since 2007 until 2019. He is the founder of Taloustutkimus Oy and also the chairman of the company's board of directors as well as the chairman of the Federation of Finnish Enterprises since 2002. Lehti is a member of the National Coalition Party.

Eero Lehti was married to Ulpu Lehti until her death in 2019. They have one daughter. Lehti collects art and Jaguar cars.

Lehti founded and owned Suomen lehtiyhtymä until its sale in 2013. The company publishes several local newspapers: Aamuposti, Helsingin Uutiset, Iltalohja, Imatralainen Jyväskylän kaupunkilehti, Karkkilalainen, Keski-Uusimaa, Kuopion Kaupunkilehti, Lappeenrannan Uutiset Länsi-Uusimaa, Länsiväylä, Mäntsälän Viikkouutiset, Nurmijärven Uutiset, Seinäjoen Sanomat, Sipoon Sanomat, Tamperelainen, Turkulainen, Uusimaa, Vantaan Sanomat, Vihdin Uutiset, Viikkouutiset ja Työ ja tekijät.
