= 612 march =

Annually organized torchlight procession on the Independence Day of Finland

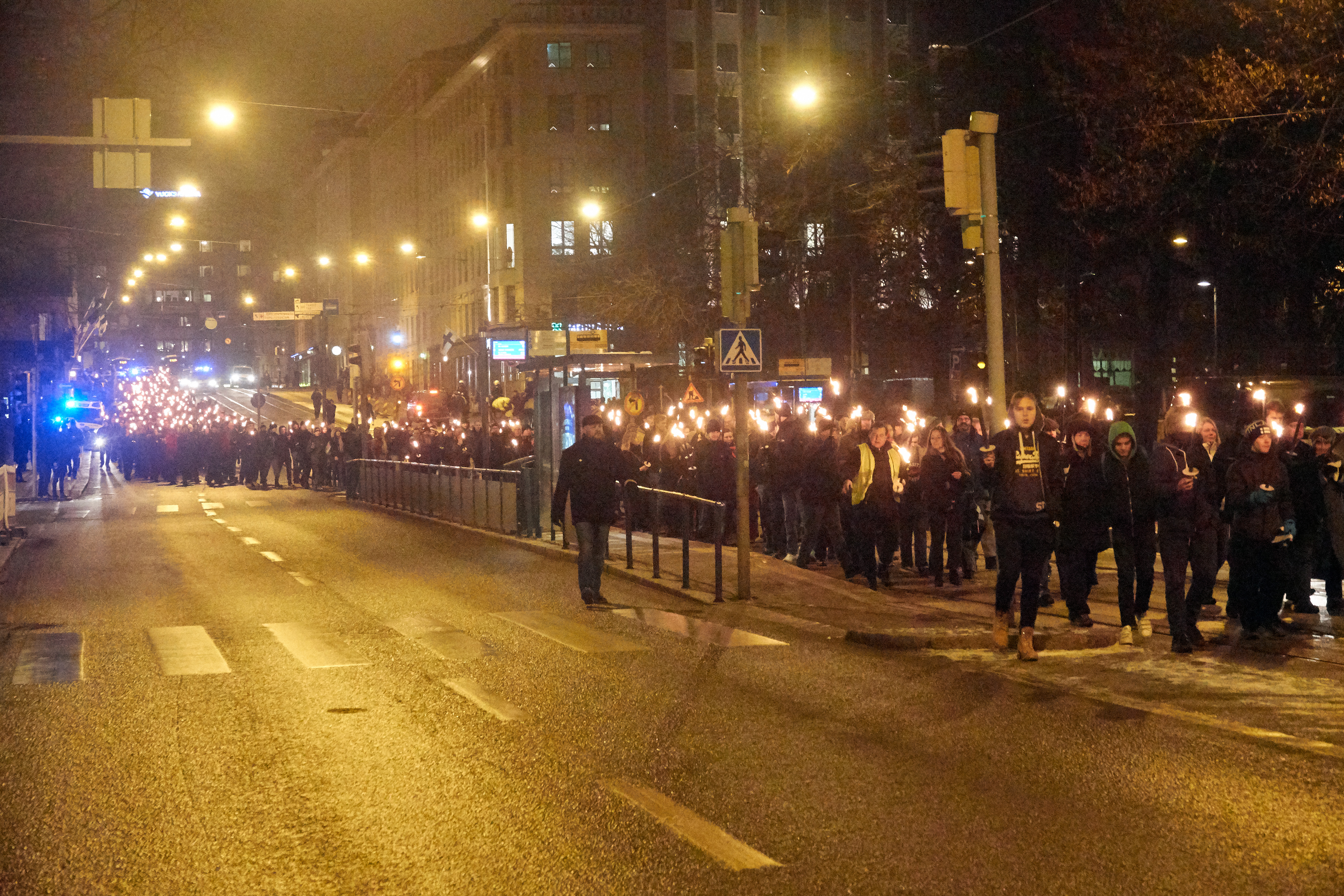
612 march in 2017

The 612 march (Finnish: 612-soihtukulkue; Swedish: 612-marschen) is an annual far-right and anti-immigration march in Helsinki, Finland, that takes place on Independence Day, which is on 6 December.

The march leaves from Töölöntori and ends at the Hietaniemi cemetery. The event ends with placing candles and wreaths at the graves. There are also speeches in connection with the procession.

According to the Police of Finland, the march attracted at its peak 3,000 attendees. By 2025, participation had dwindled to 700–800, with counter-protesters numbering 2000–3000.

== Origins ==
The 612 march has been organized by the unregistered organisation 612.fi since 2014. At its founding, the heads of the organisation were chairman Timo Hännikäinen, who is also the owner of the website, and vice-chairman Jari-Pekka Marin.

In the first march organized in 2014, members of the far-right Finnish Resistance Movement acted as security officers for the event. Former leader of the FRM, Esa Henrik Holappa has claimed that they played a key role in the initial organisation of the event, though this claim has been disputed by both Hännikäinen and Marin.

== Perspectives on the event ==
The march has been criticized in foreign media as a neo-Nazi "SS march" because the event ends at the Hietaniemi cemetery where participants visit the monument to the Finnish SS Battalion and the tomb of Carl Gustaf Emil Mannerheim. The demonstration is also opposed by the yearly antifascist "Helsinki Without Nazis" event. SUPO has characterized the march as "far-right" and "anti-immigrant". The participants have allegedly given Nazi salutes and attacked the counterdemonstrators. According to literature professor Kuisma Korhonen of University of Jyväskylä, the torches symbolize "eternal Finnishness" and are reminiscent of a Ku Klux Klan rally. The march is attended and promoted by the Finns Party while it is condemned by left-wing parties. Iiris Suomela of the Green League characterized it as "obviously neo-Nazi" and expressed her disappointment in it being attended by such a large number of people.

In 2024, two members of the Finnish parliament, Teemu Keskisarja and Sheikki Laakso, stated they planned to participate in the march rather than the traditional gala at the Presidential Palace. The Finns Party leader, Riika Purra, defended their plans on the basis of freedom of assembly and speech, although she clarified that her party did not condone the far-right. Petteri Orpo, while noting he did not have the authority as prime minister to tell people where they "should go and not go", denounced their decision to attend as "inappropriate and wrong."

== Speakers ==
Year	Speaker	Description	Source
2014	Timo Hännikäinen	Author and founder of 612.fi	
2015	Tapio Linna	Former chairman of the far-right organisation National Radical Party and promoter of James Mason's book Siege	
2016	Tuukka Kuru	Politician and future chairman of the fascist Blue-and-Black Movement	
2017	Speech replaced by independence day concert at Bar Rock Bear		
2018	No Speaker		
2019	Jasmina Ollikainen	Activist and member of Finns Party	
2020	Event not held due to the coronavirus epidemic		
2021	Kristian Viding; Simo Grönroos	Activist and chairman of Suomen Sisu since 2022 politician and member of Finns Party	
2022	Henri Hautamäki	Politician, former chairman of Suomen Sisu	
2023	Daniel Martikainen	Estonian-Ingrian activist	
2024	Teemu Keskisarja	Historian, politician, member of parliament for Finns Party	
2025	Christian Heikkonen	Activist and member of Suomen Sisu	

== Related events ==
Finnish Hammerskins have headquarters called "Hammer House" in Uusimaa that hosts participants of the 612 march.

Sarastus has also organized bussing from the cemetery to neo-Nazi music gigs organized in concert with the event.

The far-right Suomi Herää -march, held annually by the Blue-and-Black movement formed as even more explicitly fascist march once 612 disallowed organizational symbols. However, the Nordic Resistance Movement took part wearing Nazi symbols the following years.

Police reported around 350 having attended the Suomi Herää march preceding 612.

== Organizations that have taken part ==
- Nordic Resistance Movement (Note: Although the NRM was officially outlawed in Finland in 2019 due to violent crimes, according to the Finnish Broadcasting Company the members have attended as usual as recently as the last year.)
- Soldiers of Odin
- Finns Party
- Active Club Network
- Blue-and-Black Movement
- Suomen Sisu

=== International ===
- Der Dritte Weg
- Junge Nationalisten
- Golden Dawn
- CasaPound

== "Helsinki Without Nazis" participants ==
- Left Youth
- Green Youth
- Friends of the Earth
- Varisverkosto
- A-ryhmä
- Aurora Helsinki

Due to the internecine violence between anarchists and communists at previous years' "Helsinki Without Nazis" demonstrations, the latter are organizing a separate demonstration in 2026 under the slogan "Work and Bread! No to Arms Build-up!"

== See also ==
- Independence March (Poland)
- Day of Honor (Hungary)
