= United Youth Clubs =

American white nationalist group

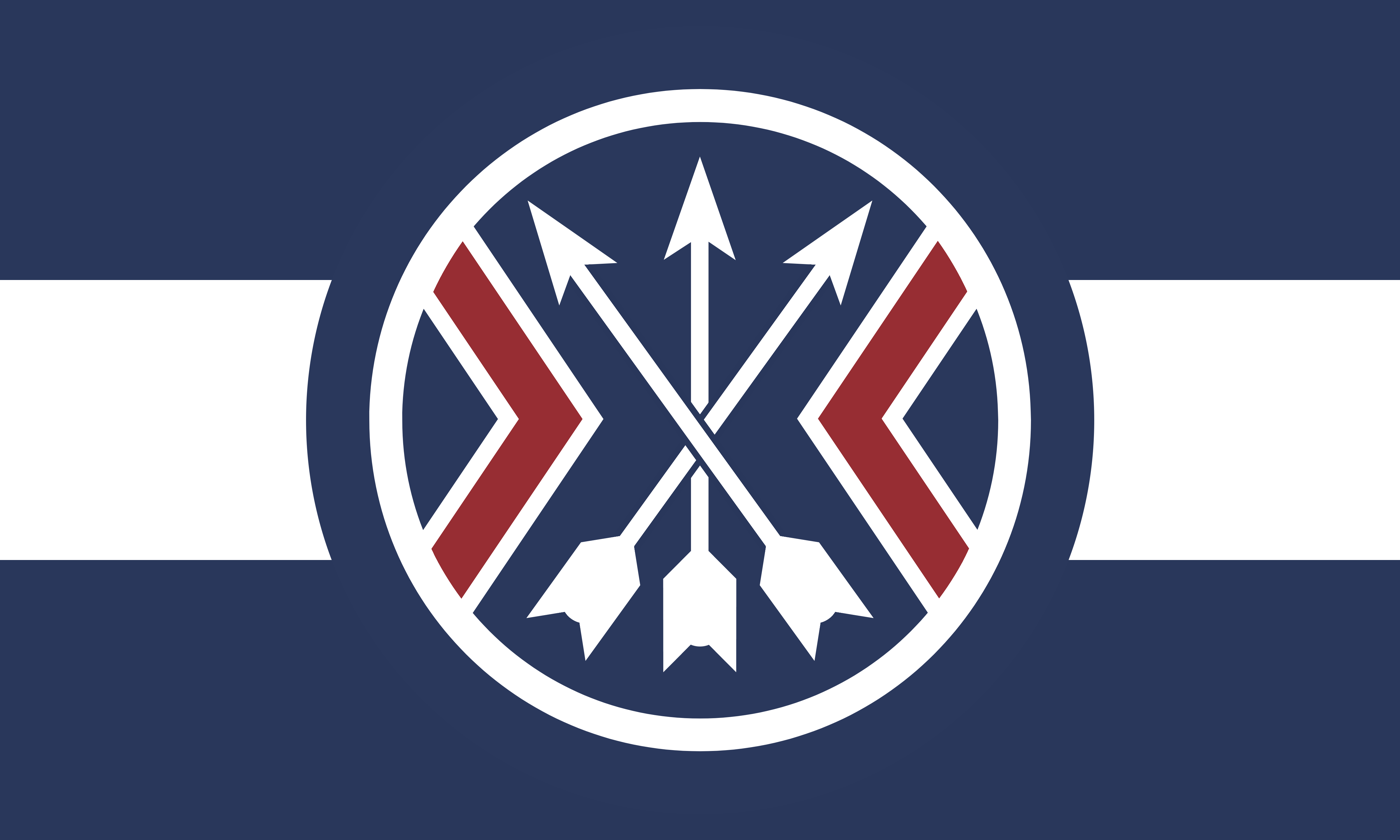
- Flag
- Formation: February 2025; 21 months ago
- Type: Neo-Nazism; White supremacy; White nationalism; American nationalism; Anti-immigration; Antisemitism; Xenophobia
- Location: United States, Canada, Estonia, Ireland, Netherlands, United Kingdom, France, Belgium
- Affiliations: Active Club Network

The United Youth Clubs (often abbreviated as UYC, or UY) are decentralized cells of white nationalist youth organizations based in the United States, founded as a youth "active club" in February 2025. It is based on the model made by Robert Rundo's Rise Above Movement.

The organization is notorious for its propaganda posters and stickers placed on buildings, which have led to controversy.

The United Youth Clubs have cells in all American States and most Canadian Provinces, and have a sister organization called Young Columbia for women.

The Global Project Against Hate and Extremism (GPAHE) reported in August 2026 that UYC had grown by 142% since 2025 and had expanded into European countries such as Estonia, Ireland, the Netherlands, the United Kingdom, France, and Belgium.

== United Youth Clubs (USA) ==
=== New England Youth Club ===
- Maine
- New Hampshire
- Vermont
- Massachusetts
- Rhode Island
- Connecticut

=== Atlantic Youth Club ===
- New York
- Pennsylvania
- New Jersey

In August 2026 The Atlantic Youth Club, along with The Garden State Active Club, Pennsylvania Active Club, Northeast Action, and The New Jersey European Heritage Association held a White Supremacist protest in Princeton, New Jersey outside the Princeton Battle Monument on the Princeton University Campus. The protest was condemned by Princeton mayor Mark Freda, saying "This is deplorable, and does not reflect the feelings or culture of Princeton". New Jersey Senator Andrew Zwicker also condemned the protest saying "Some cowards in masks won't change the fact that our communities in Princeton and all across New Jersey are better because of our diversity. Any real New Jerseyan knows this, and anyone hateful enough to hold up a sign saying otherwise doesn't belong here".

=== Chesapeake Youth Club ===
- Virginia
- Maryland
- Delaware

=== Appalachia Youth Club ===
- West Virginia

=== Carolinas Youth Club ===
- North Carolina
- South Carolina

=== Sunshine State Youth Club ===
- Florida

=== Deep South Youth Club ===
- Georgia
- Alabama
- Tennessee

=== Gulf Coast Youth Club ===
- Mississippi
- Louisiana

=== Alamo Youth Club ===
- Texas

=== Heartland Youth Club ===
- Kansas
- Missouri
- Oklahoma
- Arkansas

=== Midwest Youth Club ===
- Ohio
- Kentucky
- Indiana

=== Great Lakes Youth Club ===
- Michigan
- Wisconsin
- Illinois

=== Great Plains Youth Club ===
- Minnesota
- Iowa
- Nebraska
- North Dakota
- South Dakota

=== Rocky Mountains Youth Club ===
- Wyoming
- Colorado

=== Wasatch Youth Club ===
- Utah

=== Sagebrush Youth Club ===
- Nevada

=== Southwest Youth Club ===
- Arizona
- New Mexico

=== Pacific Northwest Youth Club ===
- Oregon
- Washington
- Montana
- Idaho

=== Kalifornian Nationalist Youth ===
- California

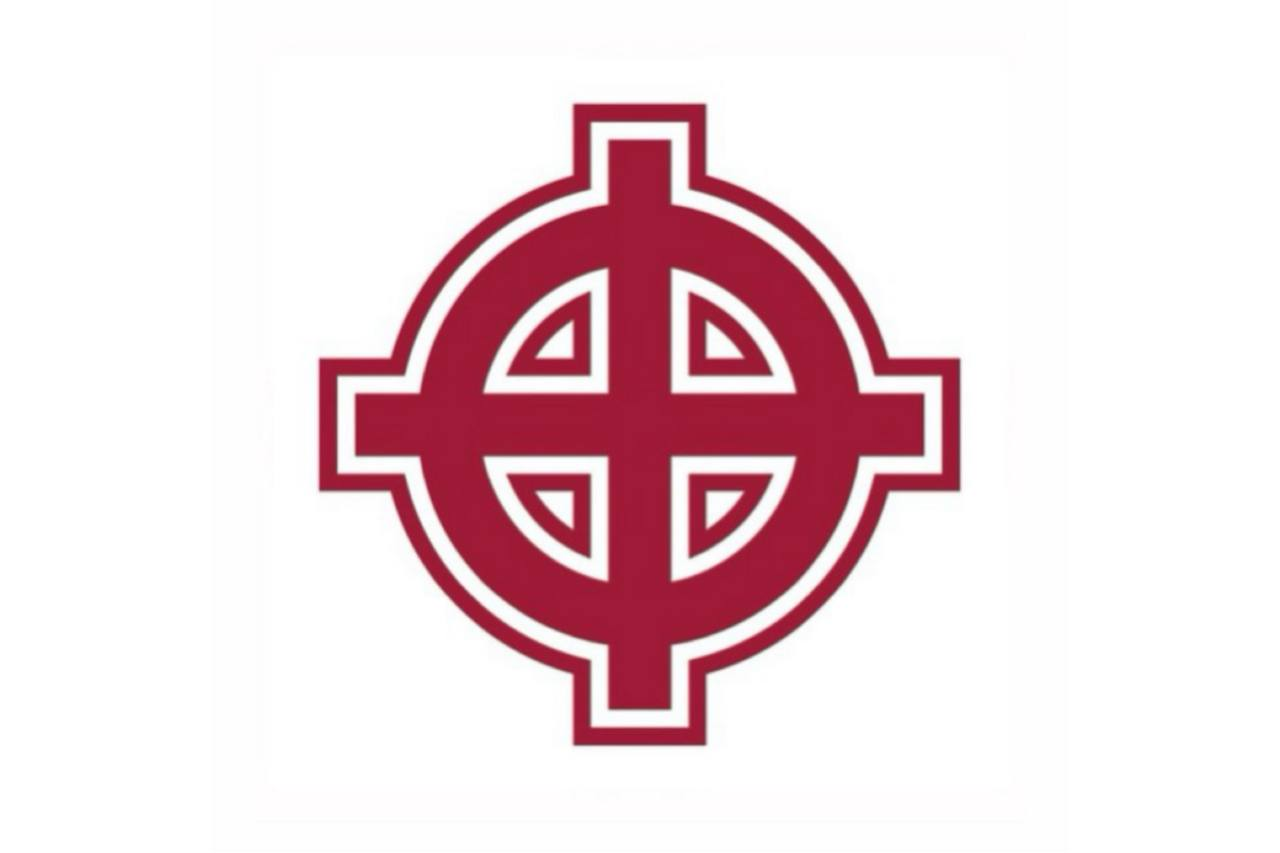
The flag of the Kalifornian Nationalist Youth

The Anti-Defamation League reported in August 2025 that members of the Kalifornian Nationalist Youth (KNY), an Active Club-like youth group which has been active since August 2024, have been regularly distributing white supremacist propaganda and engaging in vandalism in California. KNY describes themselves as "a fraternal organization made up of White youths across the state of California" who are "dedicated to organizing the Youth of our state to defend one another from the likes of antifa and the hooked nose zionists." The group also encourages training in MMA like most other active clubs. KNY announced their first regional chapter in Sacramento called Sutter City. The Global Project Against Hate and Extremism reported in June 2025 members of KNY were using hateful imagery in their stickering, including the Black Sun which was popularized by Nazi SS leader Heinrich Himmler. Open Measures reported in December 2025 that KNY was one of the largest youth chapters in America along with the Atlantic Youth Club. The Terrorism Research and Analysis Consortium reported in July 2026 that the Kalifornian Nationalist Youth opened a second regional chapter in Los Angeles named "Tommasi City Nationalist Youth" after neo-Nazi Joseph Tommasi.

=== Last Frontier Youth Club ===
- Alaska

=== Aloha Youth Club ===
- Hawaii

== True North Youth (Canada) ==
=== Ontario Youth Club ===
- Ontario

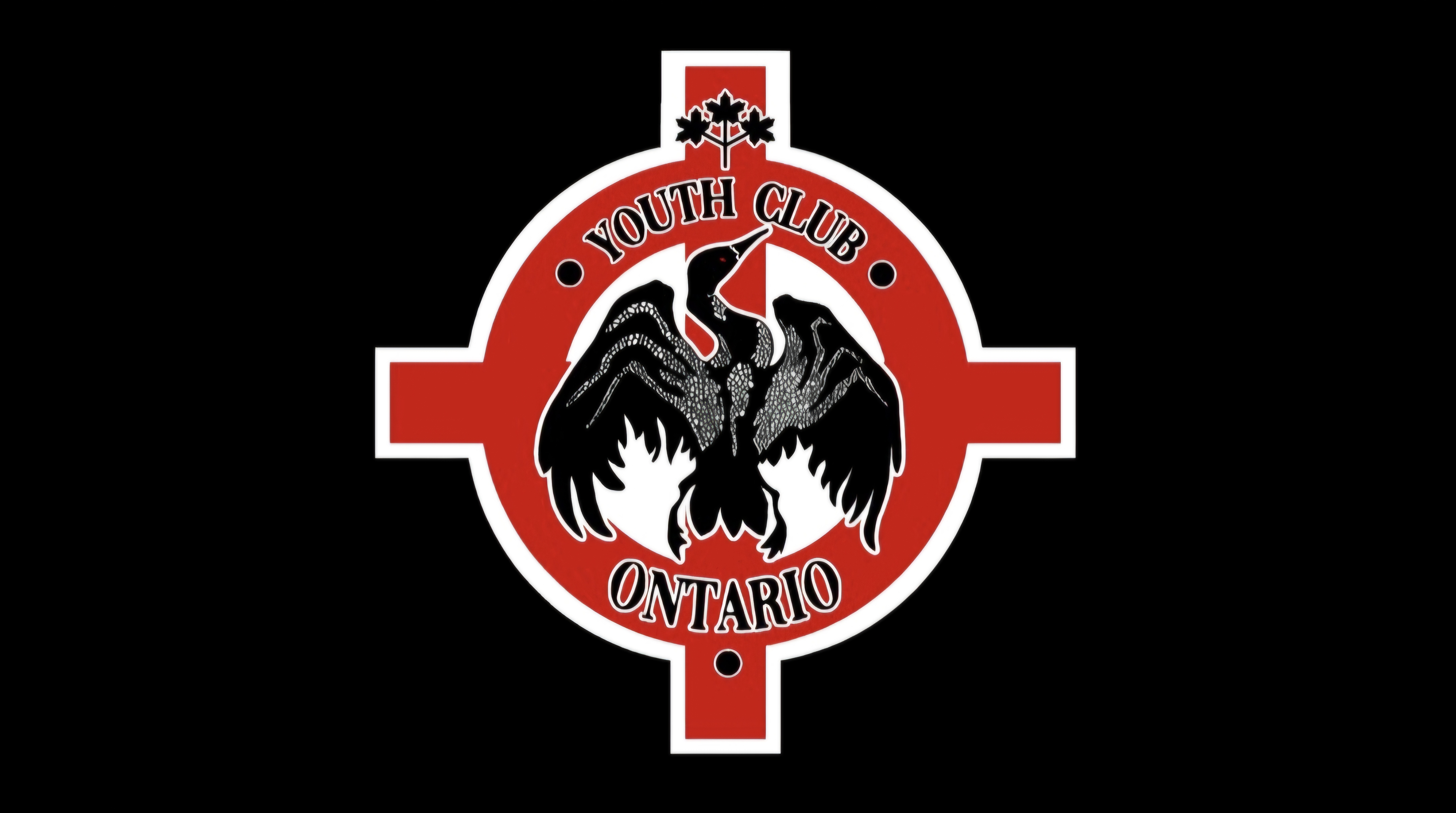
Flag of the Ontario Youth Club

=== Nova Scotia Youth Club ===
- Nova Scotia

=== Alberta Youth Club ===
- Alberta

=== Frontenac Youth Club ===
- Quebec

=== British Columbia Youth Club ===
- British Columbia

=== Newfoundland Youth Club ===
- Newfoundland and Labrador

== See also ==
- Active clubs
- Patriot Front
- Fascism
- Fascism in the United States
- Far-right politics
- List of neo-Nazi organizations
- List of organizations designated by the SPLC as hate groups
