= Active clubs =

Decentralized cells of white supremacist and neo-Nazi groups

- The Celtic Cross is commonly used by many of the clubs.
- Founder: Robert Rundo
- Founded: 2021
- Country: United States, Finland, Estonia, Germany, Sweden, France, Czech Republic and other European countries as well as Canada, Australia and Colombia.
- Headquarters: California; Ontario
- Ideology: Neo-Nazism; White supremacy; White nationalism; Anti-immigration; Ultranationalism
- Political position: Far-right
- Status: active
- Website: activeclub.org activeclubengland.org (England) aktivklubb.se (Sweden) www.aktivklubb.no (Norway)

Active clubs are decentralized cells of white supremacist and neo-Nazi groups masquerading as a fitness-focused organization active in North America and Europe. Largely inspired by the defunct street-fighting Rise Above Movement formed by Robert Rundo in 2017 and hooliganism, the network was created in January 2021 and promotes mixed martial arts to fight against what it asserts is a system that is targeting the white race, as well as a "warrior spirit" to prepare for a forthcoming race war. Some extremism researchers have characterized the network as a "shadow or stand-by army" which could be activated for coordinated violence. The English branch was involved in organising the 2024 United Kingdom riots and the 2026 Northern Ireland riots.

== Origins ==
The origin of the network has been traced to Robert Rundo, who formed the Rise Above Movement in Southern California in 2017. Facing federal rioting charges in the United States, Rundo left for southeastern Europe to promote the movement. He has described his goal as creating "White Nationalism 3.0" and envisioned a decentralized cell network that would be difficult for researchers and law enforcement to track. He created an online messaging and merchandising organization to encourage communications with other white supremacist groups, such as Patriot Front.

Rundo was extradited from Romania to face charges in the United States in August 2023. His supporters have held "Free Rundo" demonstrations in several countries, including Russia, Sweden, and Canada.

== Description ==
The network adheres to the Great Replacement and white genocide conspiracy theories, conspiracy theories which are based on the belief that globalist western elites, Jewish elites and the mainstream media are jointly engaging in a global conspiracy to replace the white population of the world with non-white immigrants. The network promotes "embracing white identity and “traditional Christian” values". According to the Institute for Strategic Dialogue, "AC members [have] argued that lynchings of Black people by the Ku Klux Klan were justified" and its social media accounts have promoted the Christian Identity theology and Racial Holy War.

According to Vice and The Guardian, members of the Atomwaffen Division are active "and play key roles" in organizing the active club network. Leading member of Atomwaffen's Canadian branch Patrick Gordon Macdonald, who has been charged with terrorism offenses, was allegedly also a member of Canadian active club. Kristoffer Nippak, another founding member of the Northern Order who also has been charged with terrorism offenses, is also a member of the active club. According to the director of the University of New Brunswick’s Criminology and Criminal Justice Program, David Hofmann, Atomwaffen is using active clubs as a cover for organizing where they have been outlawed as a terrorist group. According to experts studying violent extremism, Active clubs promote accelerationist ideologies. Further, Active Club Finland trains Karelian separatists that the Secretary of the Security Council of Russia Nikolai Patrushev characterized as a terrorist group. New Jersey man Andrew Takhistov who took part in an active club "Free Rundo" demonstration is charged with plotting an attack on energy infrastructure and synagogues. Takhistov also stated that he was involved in the production of Terrorgram propaganda and planned to join the Russian Volunteer Corps.

In September 2023, the Counter Extremism Project (CEP) characterized the network as a transnational movement which seeks to create a "shadow or stand-by army" that can mobilize itself for the purpose of launching "coordinated, large-scale" violent attacks. A CEP study revealed that the network adhered to a strategy of "hiding in plain sight" by showing a "friendly face" to recruit young white men for fitness, sports and martial arts.

== Expansion ==
Alexander Ritzmann, the author of the 2023 CEP study, stated "I've never seen a network in right-wing extremism grow so fast. Usually it takes years to build a transnational network."

As of August 2023, the Anti-Defamation League found that active clubs have claimed to be present in at least 33 U.S. states. Active clubs have also been formed in Lithuania, France, Estonia, Finland, the Netherlands, Sweden, Norway, Denmark, Italy, Poland, United Kingdom, and Croatia, as well as in the Czech Republic.

In June 2025, the Global Project Against Hate and Extremism (GPAHE) reported that there were now 187 active AC chapters in 27 countries. They reported that this represented an increase of 25% since late 2023. Half of the new AC chapters were "Youth Clubs" that "recruit teen boys 15 to 18".

=== Australia ===
In August 2024, it was reported that Australia had an active club network. Known neo-Nazi Thomas Sewell leads a group in South Australia known as Croweater. Sewell was suspended from X in July 2024, but the Croweater page remains, featuring a photo of masked members carrying a banner reading "Australia for the white man". However the clubs were not well-established in Australia as of August 2024.

=== Canada ===
As of March 2026, over 30 clubs operate in Canada. According to an internal Public Safety Canada brief which was obtained by CBC News, Canada has a "disproportionate" number of active clubs compared to other nations. This is not counting the over 15 chapters of the Second Sons, an organization which the report by Public Safety Canada describes as "a similar far-right group."

The Nationalist-13 active club which is based in Hamilton, Ontario has been noted by CBC News for becoming more public and active in 2025.

There is also a continuity of violent far-right activism: Canadian Active Clubs have strong presence in London, Ontario, a stronghold of the Canadian Klan.

Members of Canadian active clubs often use the Canadian Red Ensign flag, believing it to be the "true" Canadian flag.

=== Czech Republic ===
A Czech branch of the Active Club network appeared on Telegram in May 2024, where it recruits young men, including minors, and posts propaganda such as the Fourteen Words and photos of graffiti bearing the Active Club and "White Lives Matter" logos. The Czech Ministry of the Interior warned about the group in its 2026 report on extremism. A reporter for Seznam Zprávy infiltrated the group for two months in 2026. The investigation found that the group uses a gym in a residential building in Libeň, Prague, as its base. Its leader, known to members as "Commander", told the reporter that members were primarily aged 15 to 35 and included fascists and National Socialists.

In October 2026 the group held its first boxing tournament, "Bohemian Fight Night", on private property in Příbor, attended by two members of the Dutch Active Club Dietsland. Members travelling to the event were recorded saying violence needed to be "accelerated" and "normalised". When a participant was knocked unconscious, the leader told members to remove their Active Club shirts and hide, and paramedics were told he had been injured in training. At the group's fourth national meeting, held in the Prague gym in late October 2026, most of the roughly 20 attendees gave Nazi salutes, and the lectures included one on National Socialism and white racial superiority.

=== Estonia ===
Estonian active club members were involved with the "NS/SK!НОВ" Telegram channel that spread terrorist propaganda and organized far-right violence. Estonian member ran the "Pedo Hunting Estonia" channel. In 2024, three Active Club Estonia members were convicted of far-right vigilantism. According to an Estonian Internal Security Service report Active Club Estonia is "a group mainly engaged in promoting Tesak-style vigilante operations in Estonia". Active Club Estonia has members fighting in Ukraine and has organized charity drives for them. Estonian Active Club was allegedly founded with the support of Estonian Atomwaffen member.

=== Finland ===
Finland is among the countries where the Active Club movement is most widespread. Local groups operate in at least nine regions, including Uusimaa and Päijät-Häme and Oulu, Turku, Tampere, and Kokkola as of 2026. Active Club Finland took part in the 2024 Independence Day march commemorating the SS organized by neo-Nazis and the Finns Party. Active club members assaulted leftist counterdemonstrators and stole and burned their flags and signs. Finnish journalists have concluded that Active Club Finland shares members with the fascist Blue-and-Black Movement. Finnish Security and Intelligence Service has classified group as extremist that threatens public order and security. Active Club Finland is affiliated with Suur-Suomen Sotilaat and the Karelian National Movement, militant separatist groups in Russia, and members have shared photos where they pose with assault rifles.

Active Club Finland took part in the 2025 Independence Day torch march in its own masked black bloc. At the starting point of the march, a group of masked men were observed assaulting a woman of foreign background. The men were wearing similar balaclavas to those used by the active club.

In 2026, Active Club Finland took part in a White May Day event organised by the Blue and Black Movement. During the event, members of Active Club Finland assaulted a counter-demonstrator and burned her banner.

According to Savon Sanomat, the support club of FC Lahti includes many members of AC Finland's youth branch "White Youth". AC Finland is also promoted by a rap group with tens of thousands of views and AC Finland has an affiliated clothing brand.

=== France ===
In April 2022, an active club branch was established in France, initially in Normandy. In 2024, Libération reported that it had around 20 local chapters and StreetPress reported that it had about a hundred members. Its logo features a knight's helmet on a fleur-de-lis and Celtic cross background. The organization maintains links with other French far-right groups such as Action Française and Groupe Union Défense. It brings together nationalist-revolutionaries, identitarians and royalists. According to the Counter Extremism Project, France is one of the countries outside North America where these groups are most active. The movement's French Telegram channel, created in 2022, has over 11,000 subscribers.

Its members took part in several violent actions, including a racially-motivated raid in Romans-sur-Isère (Auvergne-Rhône-Alpes), anti-immigration demonstrations in Saint-Brevin-les-Pins (Pays de la Loire), and clashes with left-wing activists in Montpellier during the 2024 farmers' protests. In Saint-Brieuc, in November 2023, three white supremacists planning to create an active club attacked an alternative venue and were sentenced to between 12 and 24 months in prison. In Mâcon, in April 2024, active club members attacked a person after a concert at an association venue; one was sentenced to 12 months under an electronic bracelet, the other to two years in prison.

=== Germany ===
As of June 2024, there are at least 12 active club groups in Germany. German groups are also affiliated with a neo-Nazi media collective led by Benjamin Moses of the neo-Nazi Freie Sachsen party, a district council member elected in Bautzen. Active Club Germany also shares members with the Junge Nationalisten (JN), and were represented in their "Kämpfen für Europa" event that had attendants from at least eight countries. The JN were also linked to the attack on Social Democrat politician Matthias Ecke. Several clubs in Ostwestfalen were raided by German authorities for illegal possession of firearms in October 2025.

=== Sweden ===
Local groups established themselves in Sweden in 2023, under the names Gym XIV and Aktivklubb Sverige. The emergence of these groups coincided with the decrease of members in the Nordic Resistance Movement who consist of similar demographics. Active club members have multiple times been aggressive against participants at Pride events in Sweden. An investigation by Expo identified approximately 80 members of Swedish active clubs, of which more than half had a criminal record, some of which included assault, illegal threats or incitement to ethnic or racial hatred.

Aktivklubb Sverige was in the news again in July 2025 when an Expo investigation found that Sweden's Migration Minister Johan Forssell's son was active in the neo-Nazi group.

In October 2025 the prosecutor brought charges against four men aged 20 to 24 in connection with a wave of violence that occurred in Stockholm in August. According to the prosecutor, the acts were motivated by racism, and each of the accused is linked to the activities of the Swedish active club branch. Oliver Sima Petrell, Olof Pantzar, Casper Englund and Joey Greven received sentences ranging from three years to three years and six months.

=== UK ===
In May 2023, Active Club Scotland (ACS) posted its first video. Members of the group have made bomb threats and marched with National Action, a banned neo-Nazi terrorist organisation, and some members have links to Patriotic Alternative. There are also other groups in the UK drawing on elements of the international active club movement. ACS often sends messages using the white supremacist slogan 14 Words on its Telegram channel. The leader of the ACS Scott Cowan has been pictured wearing vest with the Blood Drop Cross of the KKK and Scottish members have also shared Holocaust denial videos by Bishop Richard Williamson on social media.

Active Club England has at least 100 members and 8 chapters. A BBC investigation found that Active Club UK Telegram channels had more than 6,000 subscribers. These channels contained celebration of Hitler's birthday and images of members wearing Waffen-SS t-shirts. They offered guidance on how to avoid police detection during the 2024 riots which followed the Southport stabbings. Active Club England was able to recruit many new members after the riots. One member, Jay Barlow (calling himself "Glenn") had previously been jailed for a knife attack in a supermarket. He joined the group just weeks after being sentenced for other offences, while still under probation and attending a mandatory "thinking skills" programme. Neil Basu, former head of UK counterterrorism policing, described Active Club England as the successor to National Action, a neo-Nazi group founded in 2013 that was banned in 2016 after celebrating the murder of MP Jo Cox by a white supremacist.

An undercover ITV investigation infiltrated the London branch, and was able to secretly record video of members during their training sessions and group socialisation. Members were filmed discussing how they would acquire weapons, making racist jokes and posing with Nazi salutes (which they refer to as "Romans"). The branch included members from Ukraine, Romania, Spain and Italy. In April, a 28 year old man was arrested on suspicion of a racially aggravated public order offence.

According to Wired, the Ulster Active Club played a role "in not only stoking tensions, but advising and orchestrating the masked youths who spearheaded much of the violence" in the 2026 Northern Ireland riots.

=== United States ===
==== Arkansas ====
Klansman and Minister of the Divine Truth Ministries Billy Roper stated that his groups organized the Arkansas Active Club. Some of the members of Roper's group are affiliated with the Phineas Priesthood and have been arrested for violence.

==== California ====
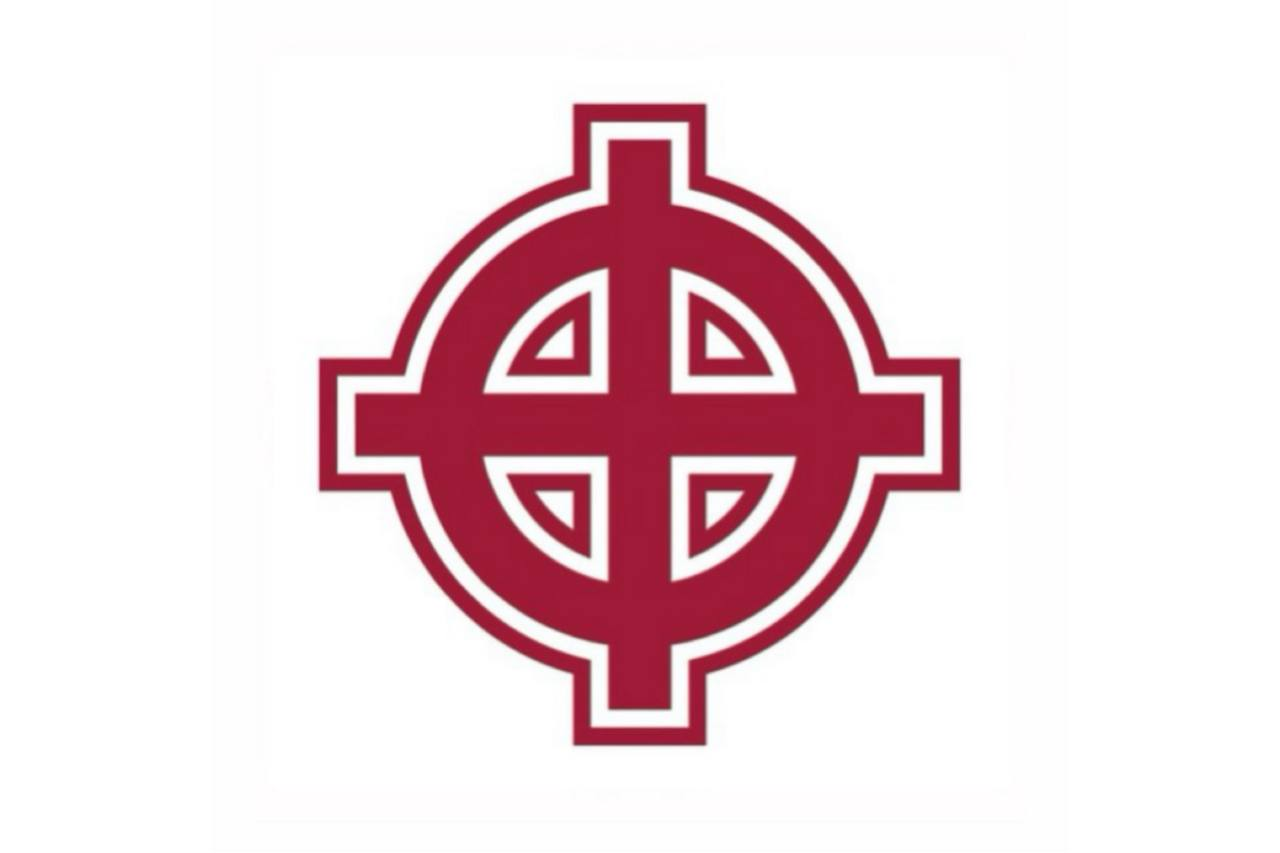
The flag of the Kalifornian Nationalist Youth

The Guardian reported in August 2023 that some in the Clockwork Crew, a cell of about one dozen members in Long Beach, California, were serving or had served in the United States military. One cell member was expelled from the Marines after he and five others were caught "stealing more than 10,000 rounds of ammunition and several grenades from a weapons depot at Camp Pendleton" in 2021. A Clockwork Crew co-founder was court-martialed, sentenced to eleven months in the brig and given a bad conduct discharge for violating the Marine Corps's ban on the advocacy of extremist ideologies.

The Anti-Defamation League reported in August 2025 that members of the Kalifornian Nationalist Youth (KNY), an Active Club-like youth group which has been active since August of 2024, have been regularly distributing white supremacist propaganda and engaging in vandalism in California. KNY describes themselves as "a fraternal organization made up of White youths across the state of California" who are "dedicated to organizing the Youth of our state to defend one another from the likes of antifa and the hooked nose zionists." The group also encourages training in MMA like most other active clubs. KNY announced their first regional chapter in Sacramento called Sutter City. The Global Project Against Hate and Extremism reported in June of 2025 members of KNY were using hateful imagery in their stickering, including the Black Sun which was popularized by Nazi SS leader Heinrich Himmler. Open Measures reported in December 2025 that KNY was one of the largest youth chapters in America along with the Atlantic Youth Club. The Terrorism Research and Analysis Consortium reported in July of 2026 that the Kalifornian Nationalist Youth opened a second regional chapter in Los Angeles named "Tommasi City Nationalist Youth" after neo-Nazi Joseph Tommasi, an early advocate of Nazi accelerationism.

==== Missouri ====
The Kansas City, Missouri, active club is led by a former marine who closely cooperates with the militia Mid Missouri Minutemen. The MMM are an explicitly antisemitic and white nationalist militia that has made posts like "GAS THE K-‑-‑-‑- RACE WAR NOW" on their social media. The MMM and active club have had shared events, like firearm drills and rucking with firearms in nature.

==== Mississippi ====
Mississippi Active Club operates under the umbrella of the Aryan Freedom Network, a Christian Identity Klan affiliated group.

==== Tennessee ====
In January 2026, two members of the Tennessee Active Club were arrested and charged with conspiracy to traffic illegal firearms by the FBI.

==== Texas ====
The Texas Active Club was split into two factions—one based in the Dallas area (Lone Star Active Club) and another (Alamo Active Club) over disagreements about the Active Club network’s ties to Patriot Front. Notably a militant dissident faction of Patriot Front named Texas Revolutionary Army exists in Texas, supported by neo-Nazi accelerationists who view Patriot Front as too moderate. Texas Revolutionary Army claimed affiliation with Alamo Active Club and alleged they both were in contact with James Mason, prominent proponent of Christian Identity and militant accelerationism.

Lone Star Active Club and Texas chapter of the Patriot Front organized a birthday party for the neo-Nazi and KKK Grand Wizard David Duke in 2025. According to The Texas Observer multiple Dallas-Fort Worth based companies participated in the event.

==== Virginia ====
The Wolves of Vinland, a group associated with active clubs, operates a compound in Lynchburg, Virginia. The compound acts as a training ground for "riot-style combat events" for various active clubs, the Patriot Front, and the Hammerskins.

==== Wisconsin ====
Wisconsin Active Club regularly organizes events with other chapters such as Illinois AC and rents gyms and Christian churches for events to "build brotherhood". According to Wausau Pilot and Review Wisconsin AC cloaks neo-Nazism in Christian language, and frequently cites the Bible in their social media posts.
