= Nationalist-13 =

Canadian neo-Nazi club

- Leaders: Brandon Lapointe, Tim Kelly
- Founded: 2021
- Country: Canada
- Headquarters: Hamilton, Ontario
- Active regions: Southern Ontario
- Ideology: Canadian nationalism White nationalism Neo-Nazism
- Political position: Far-right; Alt-right
- Status: Active
- Size: Over 1,000 members (by May 2023)

Nationalist-13 (also known as NS13) is a Canadian neo-Nazi "Active Club".

== Organization ==
Similar to the Second Sons, Nationalist-13 is a men's only, Canadian nationalist, and white nationalist group that uses gyms as meet-up spots and for fitness training via martial arts. A CBC report noted that despite the similarities between the two groups, the Second Sons and Nationalist-13 are different and unrelated organizations. Nationalist-13 also has a Youth Division.

== History ==
The group is based in Hamilton, Ontario. It was also reported to be active in the Niagara Region. According to the Canadian Anti-Hate Network, Nationalist-13 "first emerged in 2021 from the Canada First propaganda network as a street activism group focused on putting up stickers in a run of similar locations throughout Hamilton. Since that time the group has evolved into something similar to an "Active Club", holding regular workout and boxing training sessions in public parks." Since 2025, the group has become more public and active.

=== Activities ===
In March 2023, members of Nationalist-13 staged a protest on the Red Hill Valley Parkway. Several members held a banner which read, "Folk, Family, Future" while two other members held the group's flag.

On 29 May 2023, stickers promoting Nationalist-13 were found on a lamppost near Gage Park. One sticker read, "White unity at every opportunity" while another sicker read "Tribe up white man".

On 22 August 2024, Nationalist-13 participated in a joint fitness training session alongside other active clubs from both Canada and the United States, including the Toronto Fitness Club, the Frontenac Active Club (based in Quebec), the Great Lakes Active Club and the Wisconsin Active Club (both based in the United States).

On 9 November 2024, 17 members of Nationalist-13 gathered in downtown Hamilton, Ontario and held a banner which read: "Mass Deportations Now".

On 3 May 2025, 33 members of Nationalist-13 gathered in front of Prince's Gates in Toronto. The members were dressed in all black and held up three banners. The first one read: "Remigration saves our nation", the second one read: "Mass deportations now" and the third one read: "D.E.I. is how nations die." One man off camera shouted, "Shiloh Hendrix" to which the 33 demonstrators replied, "Did nothing wrong!"

On 28 June 2025, members of Nationalist-13 staged a protest outside of city hall in London, Ontario which lasted for 10 to 15 minutes. Members of the group were dressed in all black and held up banners which read: "mass deportations now" and "no blood for Israel".

On 29 November 2025, between 10 and 15 members of Nationalist-13 protested in Gore Park in Hamilton. Several members held a banner which read, "White Men, Fight back!"

On 24 January 2026, between 10 and 20 members of Nationalist-13 held a demonstration across from the Tim Hortons drive-thru on Livingston Avenue in Grimsby, Ontario for around 10 minutes.

On 7 February 2026, members of Nationalist-13 gathered on the Casablanca Boulevard bridge over the Queen Elizabeth Way.

On 19 February 2026, posters supporting the group were spotted on street poles in downtown Saskatoon. This indicates that the group now has a presence in the province of Saskatchewan.

On 22 February 2026, 19 members of Nationalist-13 protested outside Hamilton City Hall, holding the group's flag and a banner reading "no mercy for pedo scum". The protest lasted 12 minutes before police arrived, at which point the group dispersed. The protest was condemned by Hamilton Mayor Andrea Horwath, who described the protest as a white supremacist rally.

On 14 October 2026, a banner was hanged from a highway overpass in Steinbach, Manitoba with the slogan "Steinbach Votes White Not Brown" with Nationalist-13 written on the bottom. The banner was removed shortly after by local RCMP.
