= Teemu Keskisarja =

Finnish historian and politician (born 1971)

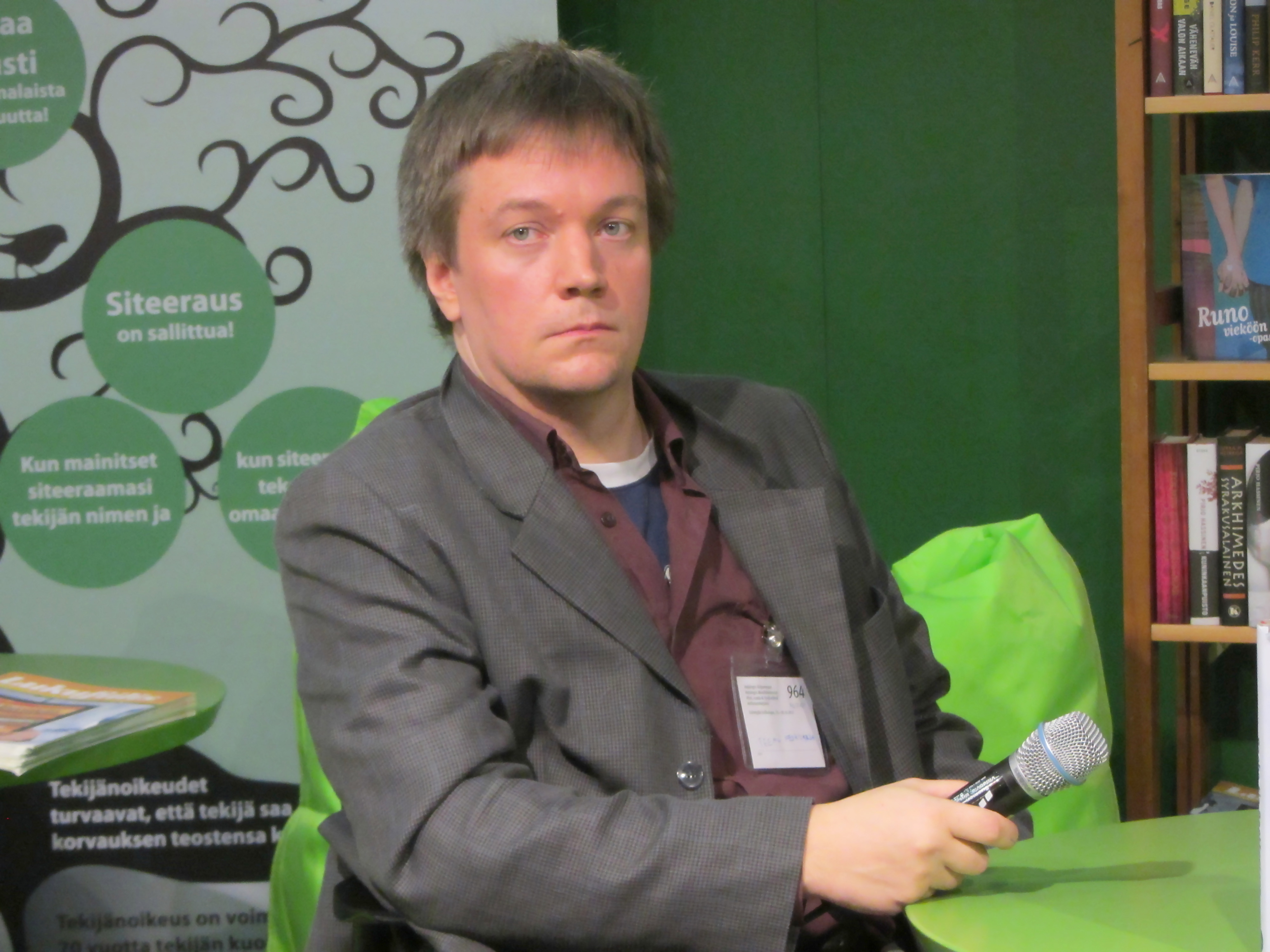
- Keskisarja at the Helsinki Book Fair in 2012

Member of the Parliament of Finland
- Incumbent
- Assumed office 5 April 2023
- Constituency: Uusimaa

Personal details
- Born: 5 August 1971 (age 54) Helsinki
- Party: Finns Party
- Profession: Historian
- Website: teemukeskisarja.fi

Teemu Aleksis Keskisarja (born 5 August 1971) is a Finnish historian and politician who has served as a member of the Parliament of Finland for the Finns Party since 2023 and as the party's first deputy chair since 2025. Prior to his political career, he was described as "the most successful and prolific historian in Finland", having authored multiple books and starred in documentaries for the Finnish public broadcasting company, Yle.

Keskisarja earned a Doctorate of Philosophy in Finnish history from the University of Helsinki in 2006 and holds the title of docent in Finnish and Nordic history at the university. His doctoral thesis covered bestiality in 18th-century Finland.

== Political career ==
Keskisarja was elected as a Member of Parliament in the 2023 elections from the Uusimaa district, receiving 6,586 votes. He was elected as the first vice chair of the Finns Party at the June 2025 party congress, defeating interior minister Mari Rantanen.

On Independence Day in 2024, Keskisarja made headlines by participating in the 612 march, associated with the far-right, instead of the traditional Independence Day Reception.

While expressing sympathy for the civilians of the Gaza Strip, Keskisarja condemned President Alexander Stubb and Foreign Minister Elina Valtonen for expressing support for a possible Finnish recognition of a Palestinian state in August 2025. According to Keskisarja, the Finnish government should not even "toy" with the idea of recognising Palestine.

In September 2025, Keskisarja's anti-immigration statements drew significant attention and controversy in Finnish media and were condemned as racist by the Non-Discrimination Ombudsman.

== Views ==
Keskisarja is known for his use of attention-grabbing, at times provocative language.

In a lecture attended by President Sauli Niinistö in 2018, Keskisarja described the events of the Finnish Civil War prison camps as a "genocide" and stated that "the Reds also died for liberty", in reference to sympathisers of the victorious Whites who often call the civil war the "War of Liberation" or "War of Independence".

While answering an audience question during a lecture in 2020, Keskisarja noted, citing Kustaa H. J. Vilkuna, that 20,000–30,000 young Finns (around 5% of Finland's population at the time) were captured into slavery in Russia during the Great Wrath, and said that "in that sense, too, it is quite laughable to sob that Finland has some sort of debt to African negros for the colonialism of France and England and Germany". Previously, in a 2017 interview for Helsingin Sanomat, he had claimed that he would rather harvest rubber in the Congo Free State than make tar in historical Kainuu.

While studying the history of bestiality in Finland in the 17th and 18th centuries, Keskisarja found that mentions of homosexuality were extremely rare while bestiality was a major issue for authorities of the time. Keskisarja suggests that there may have been fewer homosexuals in the 18th century because sexuality is also shaped by an era's living conditions and culture. He states that humans and animals were not necessarily considered very different, living in similar conditions during winters, and that "A good steed or a milking cow were financially more valuable than a farmhand. Perhaps our ancestors didn't view animals as lesser creatures."

In August 2025, Keskisarja caused a controversy with his statements critical of immigrants, stating that "immigrants are turning Finland into a developing country, a pigsty and a massacre".
