= Tuukka Kuru =

Finnish politician

- Born: 18 October 1990 (age 36); Rovaniemi, Finland
- Occupations: Politician, activist
- Known for: Chairperson of the Blue-and-Black Movement
- Political party: Blue-and-Black Movement

Tuukka Sauli Johannes Kuru (born 18 October 1990) is a Finnish far-right nationalist politician and activist. He has been the chairperson of the Blue-and-Black Movement (Sinimusta Liike, SML) since the party was founded in January 2021.

== Early life and background ==
Kuru was born in Rovaniemi. He graduated as a mechanical engineer and has worked in the construction sector. Before national politics, he was active in the Finns Party Youth and served as the Lapland district leader of the nationalist organisation Suomen Sisu. He was also involved with the Muutos 2011 party.

== Political career ==
Kuru co-founded the Blue-and-Black Movement after internal disputes over ethnonationalism in the Finns Party Youth. Under his leadership, the party collected the required 5,000 signatures and was first registered in June 2022. It was deregistered by the Supreme Administrative Court in April 2024 and successfully re-registered on 28 May 2025.

In the 2023 Finnish parliamentary election, Kuru was the party's candidate in the Uusimaa constituency, receiving 323 personal votes. The party received 2,307 votes (0.07%) nationwide and won no seats.

Kuru regularly speaks at nationalist events, including Independence Day gatherings, and has given interviews outlining the party's radical traditionalist and ethnonationalist positions.

== Views and legal issues ==
Kuru has described the Blue-and-Black Movement as maintaining a "racial identity" and stated that the party meets several common descriptors of fascism, including strong nationalism and support for a mixed/corporatist economy while opposing current forms of capitalism.

He has faced multiple legal consequences for public statements. In 2023, Satakunta District Court convicted him of incitement against an ethnic group (kiihottaminen kansanryhmää vastaan) over a 2020 tweet suggesting that "criminalising Judaism actually sounds quite good" in a discussion on circumcision. He was fined 1,280 euros and ordered to delete the post.

In January 2026, Kuru and six supporters were charged again with incitement to hatred. The case concerns a 2023 social media post in which he referred to a parliamentary candidate with a foreign background as a "foreign species" (vieraslaji). Kuru has denied committing any crime in both cases.

The party and Kuru have also been criticised for antisemitic statements, strong opposition to Israel, and links between some supporters and banned far-right groups such as the Nordic Resistance Movement.
