= Aryan Freedom Network =

American neo-Nazi group

- Founder: Dalton Henry Stout
- Founded: 2018
- Country: United States and various European countries
- Headquarters: Texas
- Ideology: Anti-black racism; Anti-communism; Antisemitism; Christian Identity (some members); Homophobia; Neo-Nazism; White supremacy
- Political position: Far-right
- Size: 1,000-1,500
- Website: https://white-power.org/

The Aryan Freedom Network (AFN) is an American neo-Nazi group based in Texas with chapters in 40 U.S. states. AFN maintains its activities by holding private events, participating in public demonstrations, and distributing flyers. The group is led by Tonia Sue Berry, Dalton Henry Stout, and his father, George Bois Stout, an arms dealer based in De Kalb. According to the Anti-Defamation League's Center on Extremism (COE) and Dallas News, AFN has significantly contributed to Texas leading the nation in white supremacist propaganda distribution.

== History ==
AFN is the latest white supremacist group established by Dalton Stout in recent years. Before 2018, Stout led a Klan group. In April 2018, he claimed that he had joined the white supremacist League of the South (LS), appearing alongside LS founder Michael Hill at a Knights Party event in Arkansas. He also attempted to establish and promote a skinhead group prior to forming AFN. AFN has welcomed "pro-White motorcycle clubs" and former members of the National Justice Party into its ranks. The group includes a youth wing called "Aryan Youth" and a women's group known as the "Valkyrie Division". AFN is also affiliated with the Aryan Nations, Active clubs, Ku Klux Klan and the American Futurist and the affiliated network of European neo-Nazis.

In August 2025, Henry Stout, the founder of the Aryan Freedom Network, said "Trump awakened a lot of people to the issues we've been raising for years. He's the best thing that's happened to us."

== Ideology ==
According to The Forward, AFN describes itself as engaging in a "racial holy war based on the ideas of White Racial Supremacy and establishing an Aryan Homeland for our People," and is "on the hunt" for communists in Texas. The group frequently shares videos showing dozens of members undergoing armed training and shooting mannequins painted with Stars of David. Membership requires individuals to be "100% of White European ancestry, including: Nordic, Slavic, Mediterranean, Celtic, or Germanic background."

== Actions ==
The AFN holds an annual "White Unity Conference" and it organized multiple anti-LGBTQ "anti-grooming demonstrations." In 2022, the group organized at least 12 private gatherings across several states, including Texas, South Carolina, Arkansas, Georgia, Mississippi, Idaho, and Nebraska. In January 2023, the AFN announced "Aryan Fest," a white supremacist music festival. During one anti-LGBTQ event, armed AFN members menaced Grand Prairie drag show attendees.

In 2022, the AFN also organized an event in Hayden, Idaho, at the former headquarters of the Aryan Nations. Both AFN and Aryan Nations share an ideological affinity for the antisemitic Christian Identity movement.

A few dozen AFN members and supporters protested a pride parade in Celina, Ohio in June 2023. Ohio Representative Angela King caused controversy for taking part in the protest.

In 2023, the AFN held an event and it also circulated flyers in Lexington, Kentucky. The flyers read: "You know who else was condemned for 'hate speech?' Jesus Christ."

In March 2026, the AFN distributed leaflets in Carlisle, Pennsylvania. The leaflets included the Fourteen Words; “We must secure the existence of our people and a future for white children.” Some Carlisle residents organized an anti-hate rally in response. The AFN gave a statement to the news that “Due to outreach, I can confirm that there are many pro-white residents in the area as well [as] surrounding areas.”

== Leadership ==
The AFN is led by Dalton Henry Stout (also known as "Brother Henry"), Tonia Sue Berry (aka Daisy Barr), and Stout's father, George Bois Stout, an arms dealer based in De Kalb. According to the Anti-Defamation League, Berry and Dalton Stout got married in 2020 but they appear to have gotten divorced in April 2022. However, according to Reuters, their divorce was a legal move to protect their assets from civil rights lawsuits, effectively, it was a divorce in name only. According to the Southern Poverty Law Center, Stout's family leads De Kalb's Ku Klux Klan chapter. Berry's father was also an Imperial Wizard of the KKK, and the couple has been described as "racist royalty".
