= Princeton Battle Monument =

Monument in Princeton, New Jersey, US

- State of New Jersey
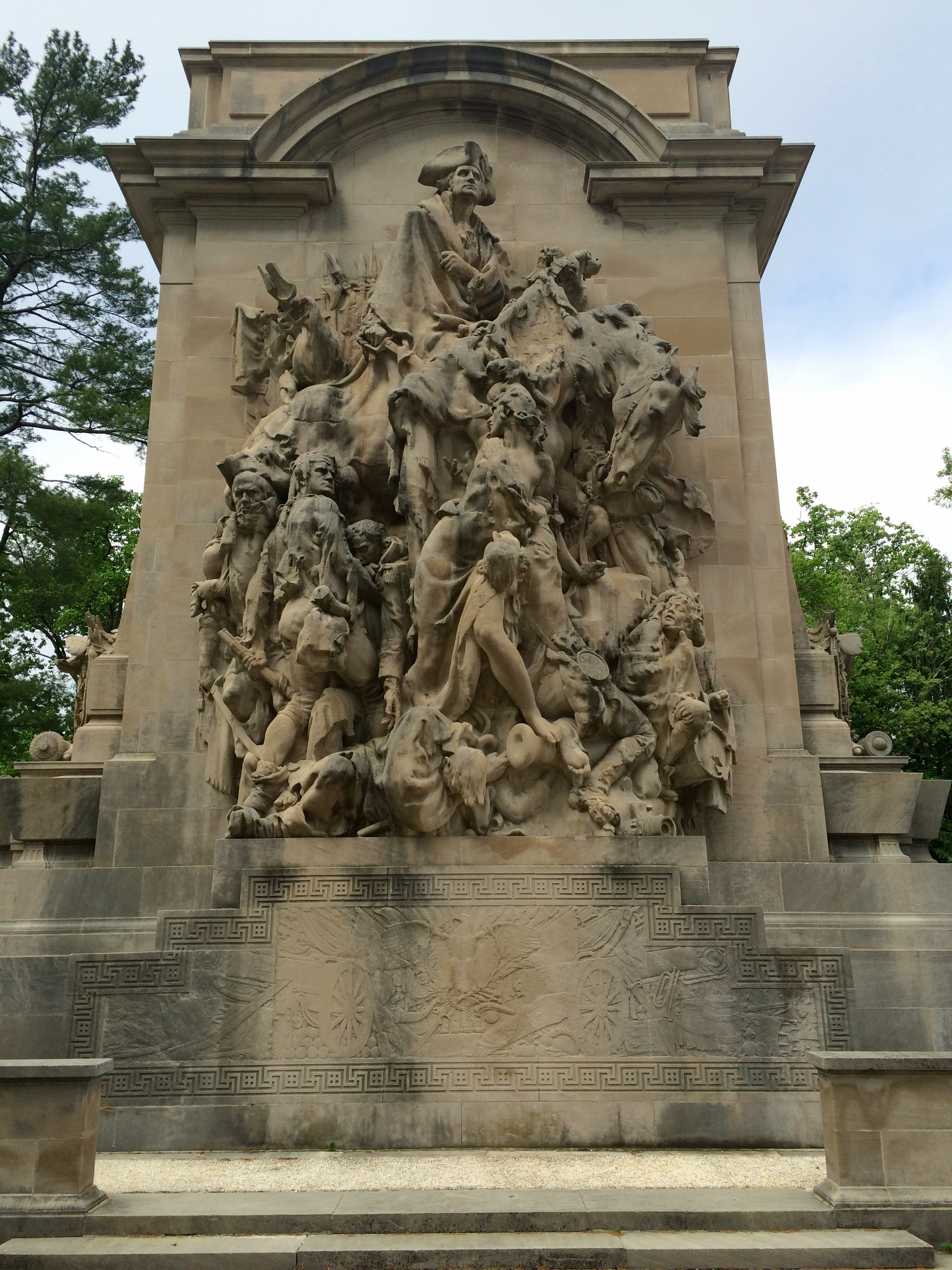
- For The Battle of Princeton, 3 January 1777
- Unveiled: 1922
- Location: Princeton, New Jersey
- Designed by: Frederick MacMonnies, Thomas Hastings
- Here memory lingers to recall the guiding mind whose daring plan outflanked the foe and turned dismay to hope when Washington, with swift resolve, marched through the night to fight at dawn and venture all in one victorious battle for our freedom.
- Princeton Battle Monument
- U.S. Historic district – Contributing property
- Location within Mercer County, New Jersey Location within New Jersey Location within the United States
- Coordinates: 40°20′52.1″N 74°39′57.1″W
- Part of: Princeton Historic District (ID75001143)
- Added to NRHP: 27 June 1975

The Princeton Battle Monument is located in Princeton, New Jersey, adjacent to Morven and Princeton's borough hall. The monument commemorates the January 3, 1777 Battle of Princeton and depicts General George Washington leading his troops to victory and the death of General Hugh Mercer. It stands 50 feet (15 m) tall and was inspired by carvings on the Arc de Triomphe in Paris. Designed to visually anchor the western end of Nassau Street, the monument and its park are a legacy of the City Beautiful movement.

== History ==
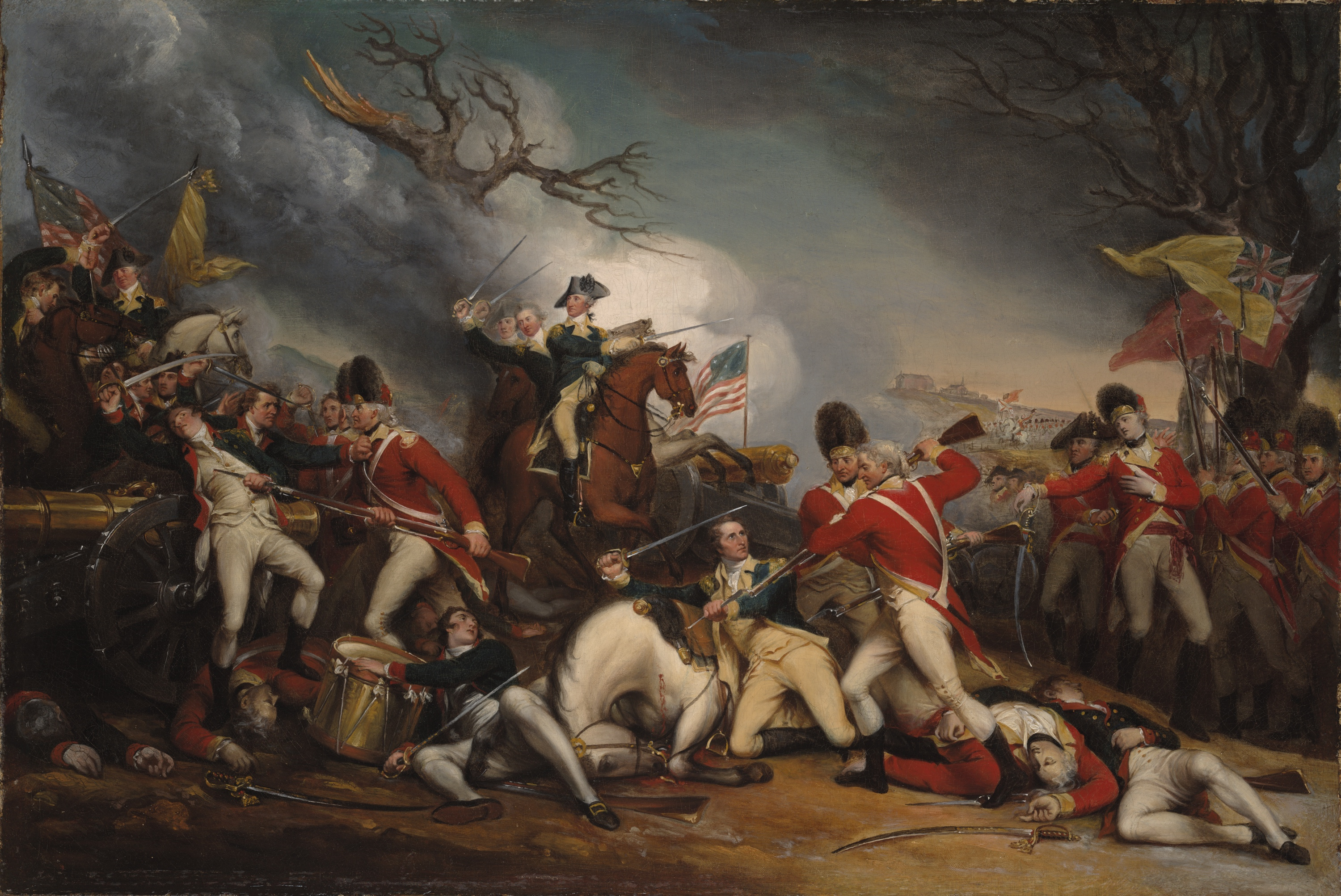
The Death of General Mercer at the Battle of Princeton, January 3, 1777 by John Trumbull

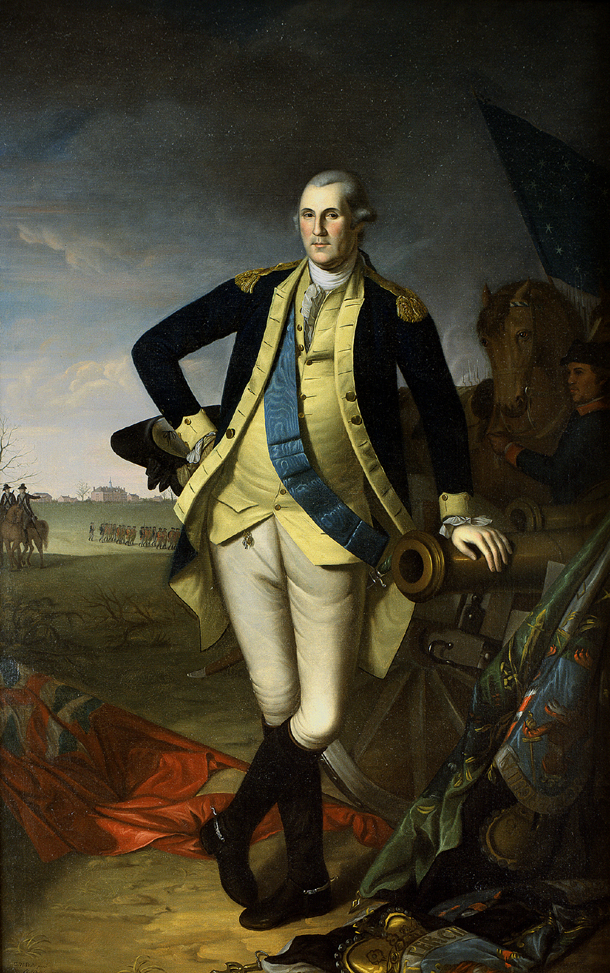
Washington at Princeton by Charles Willson Peale (1779)

=== Design ===
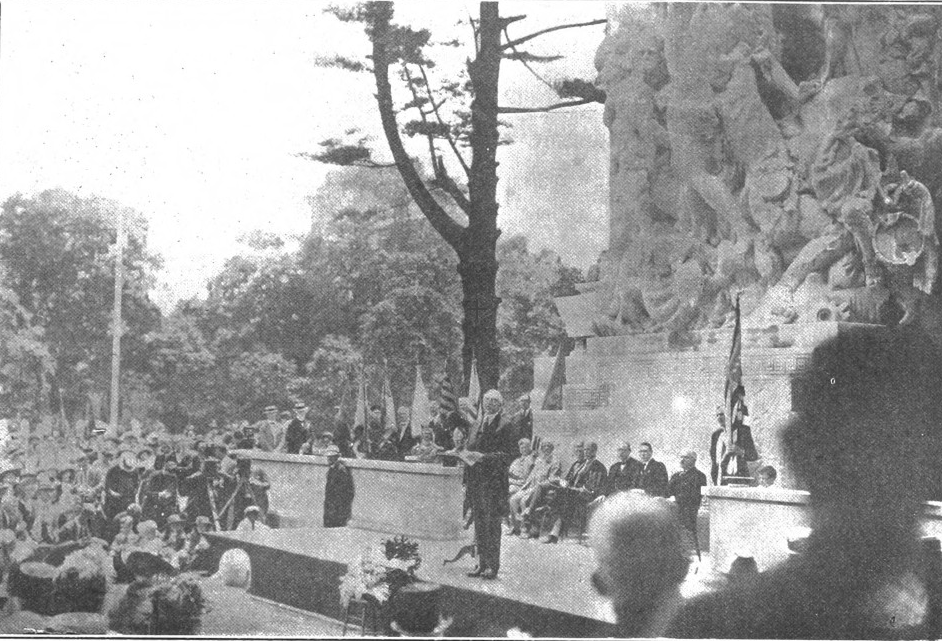
President Warren G. Harding at the dedication of the monument

An act of Congress on June 8, 1906, appropriated $30,000 to be given to the Princeton Battle Monument Association for the erection of a monument commemorating the Battle of Princeton. The association, which dates back to 1887 and includes such local notables as Allan Marquand and Moses Taylor Pyne, was required to match the $30,000 with an equal sum raised independently. On February 24, 1908, having raised the requisite funds, the association commissioned prominent Beaux Arts sculptor Frederick MacMonnies to build the monument. The architectural design was done by Thomas Hastings of the acclaimed firm Carrère and Hastings.

It was difficult to find an appropriate location for the monument, and it was first planned for the piece of land at the corner of Mercer and Nassau Streets. That triangular plot was cleared of buildings in 1913 but ultimately used for the Princeton War Memorial. In 1914, a piece of property was donated by the Princeton Inn Company. The Inn, which stood on the current location of the Princeton Borough Hall, donated a 500 feet (150 m) stretch of land between Bayard Lane and Morven, from Stockton Street north to the row of chestnut trees in front of the inn. This property provided not only enough space for the monument and a park but also a highly visible location where the monument could stand at the end of a long vista from Nassau Street.

The MacMonnies design is a light-grey bas-relief with George Washington on horseback as the dominant figure. Washington is depicted sternly refusing defeat and inspiring his battle-weary troops to victory. Beneath Washington is a young woman personifying Liberty, wearing a Phrygian cap and holding a banner to urge the soldiers onward. She is flanked by troopers and a drummer boy of the Continental Army. Beneath can be seen the death of General Mercer, after whom the local county would be named. The structure was originally intended to be bronze and granite, but by 1918, it was decided that Indiana Limestone would be preferable.

The monument, which was carved in situ by the Piccirilli Brothers, was completed in 1922 and dedicated by President Warren G. Harding. A 21-gun salute by the Princeton University Field Artillery ROTC and an invocation by the Right Reverend Paul Matthews, bishop of the Episcopal Diocese of New Jersey, marked the festivities. The President received an honorary Doctor of Laws degree from Princeton University on the same day.

=== Illumination and restoration ===
Nighttime illumination of the monument was part of the original plan for its construction, but it was only in 2007, 85 years after the completion of the monument, that the lighting work finally got underway after a successful fundraising effort by the Princeton Parks Alliance. Charles Stone of the New York firm Fischer Marantz Stone designed the lighting scheme. After years of neglect and unsuccessful restorations, the monument underwent professional conservation treatment in 2006 and 2007 as part of the State of New Jersey's historic preservation initiative. The treatment was carried out by Aegis Restauro, LLC, led by conservators Zbigniew Pietruszewski and Joanna Pietruszewski and Farewell, Mills and Gatsch Architects. In September 2007, the Monument was ceremoniously rededicated when the lights were switched on for the first time.

In 2023, nonprofit Sustainable Princeton raised $36,000 to begin revitalizing the garden beds surrounding the monument and park. The purpose of the project was to clear the invasive species of plants and fill them with native species of flowers, shrubs, and grasses to beautify the area and educate the public and the importance of native species. The gardens are a Certified Wildlife Habitat and a Monarch Waystation. In 2026, White Nationalist group Atlantic Youth Club protested in front of the monument with other White Supremacist groups. The protest was condemned by Princeton mayor Mark Freda, saying "This is deplorable, and does not reflect the feelings or culture of Princeton". New Jersey Senator Andrew Zwicker also condemned the protest saying "Some cowards in masks won't change the fact that our communities in Princeton and all across New Jersey are better because of our diversity. Any real New Jerseyan knows this, and anyone hateful enough to hold up a sign saying otherwise doesn't belong here".

=== Inscription ===
The inscription on the rear face of the monument, composed by Andrew Fleming West, reads:

Here memory lingers to recall the guiding mind,
Whose daring plan outflanked the foe and turned dismay to hope,
When Washington, with swift resolve, marched through the night,
To fight at dawn and venture all in one victorious battle for our freedom.

A Latin phrase reads:

Saecula Praetereunt Rapimur Nos Ultro Morantes Adsis Tu Patriae Saecula Qui Dirigis
The ages pass away. We, too, though lingering, are hurried on. O Thou who guides the ages, stay to guard our land.

== Gallery ==
The Monument and Park

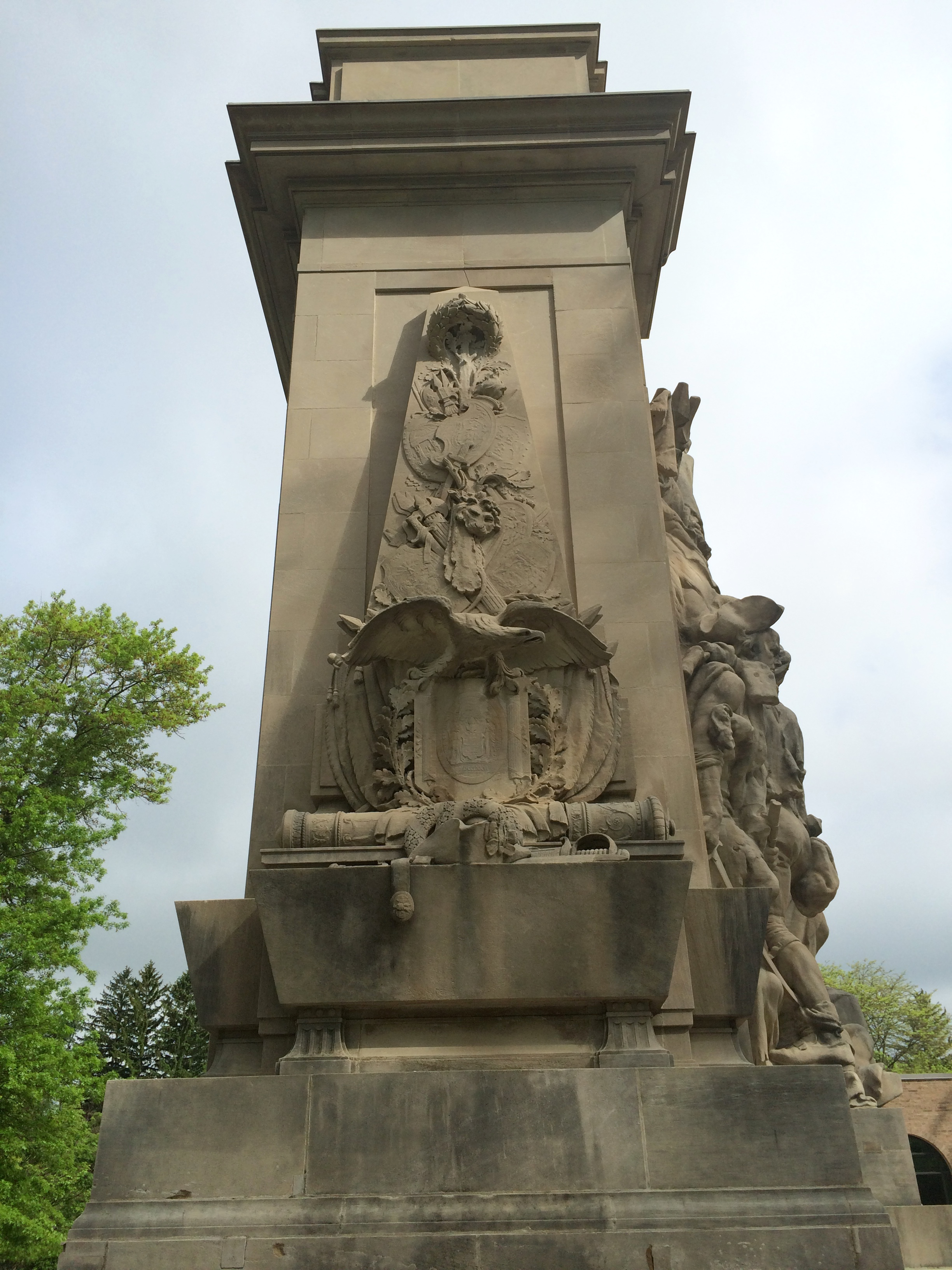
The south facade; the sides of the monument show the seal of the United States and the original thirteen colonies.

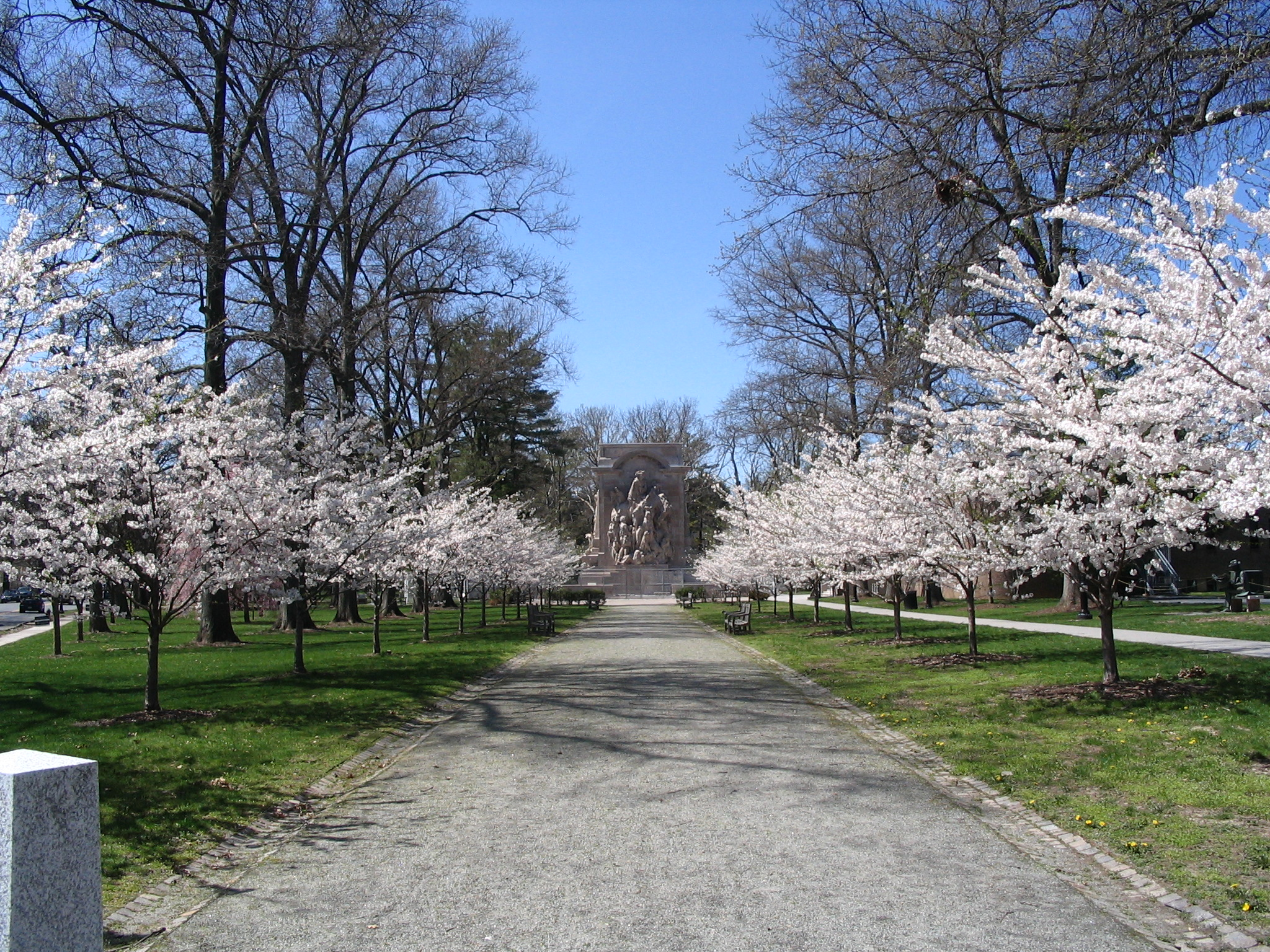
The mall leading to the monument, which aligns with Nassau Street. The cherry trees are a modern addition and first bloomed in 2002.

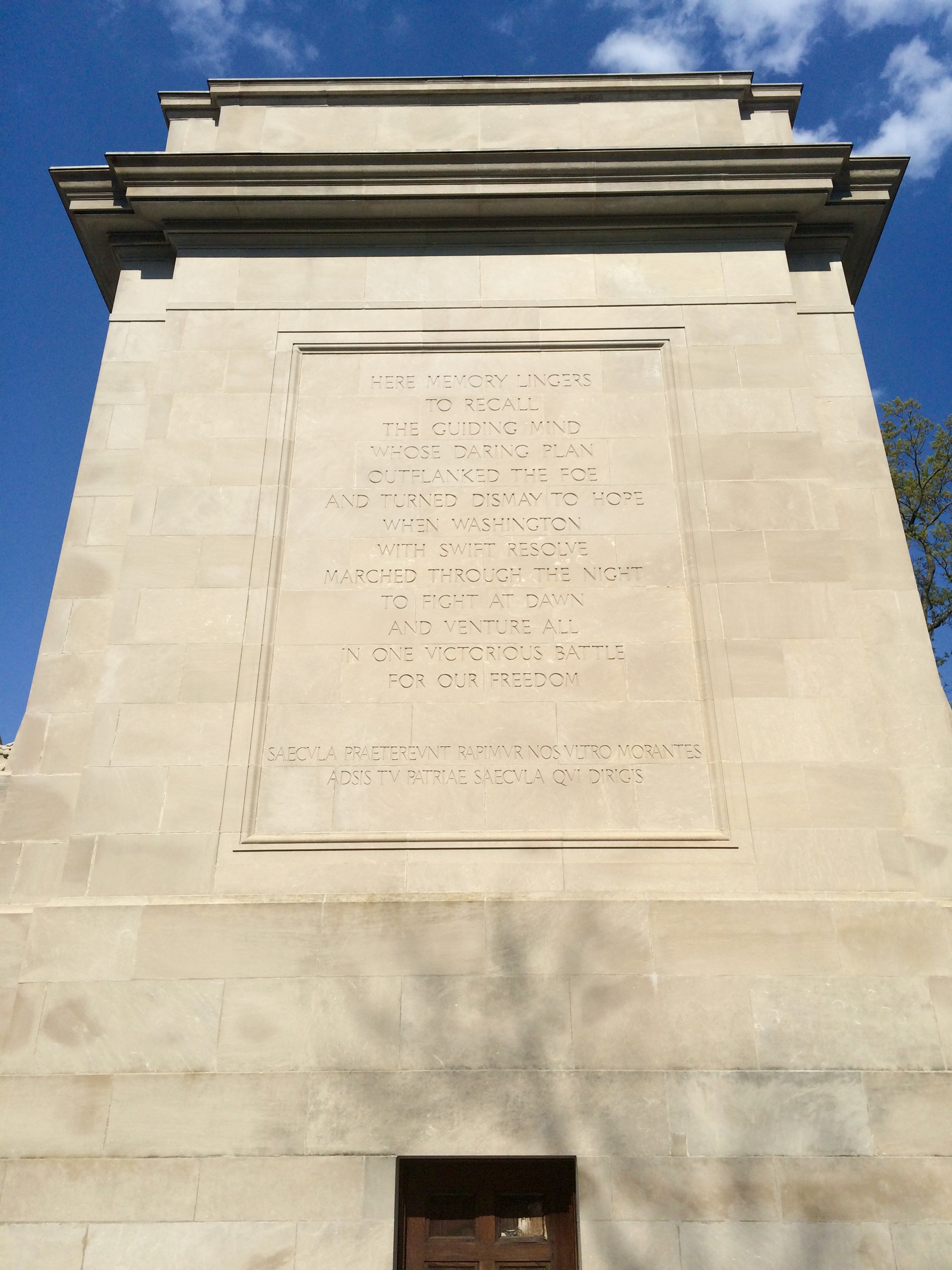
The rear face of the monument showing the inscription.

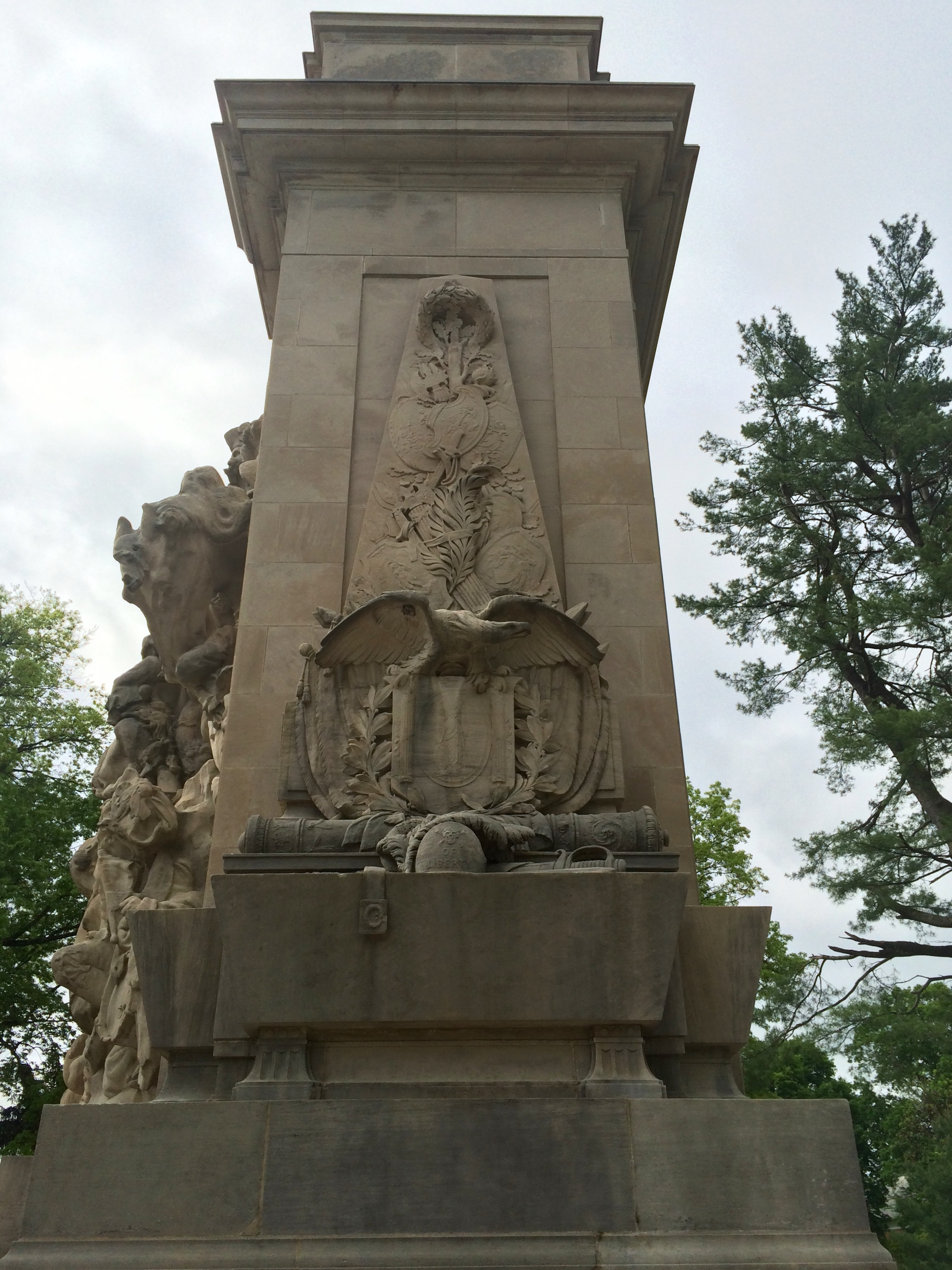
The north facade, note the " Or Liberty" at bottom center
Statues in the Park

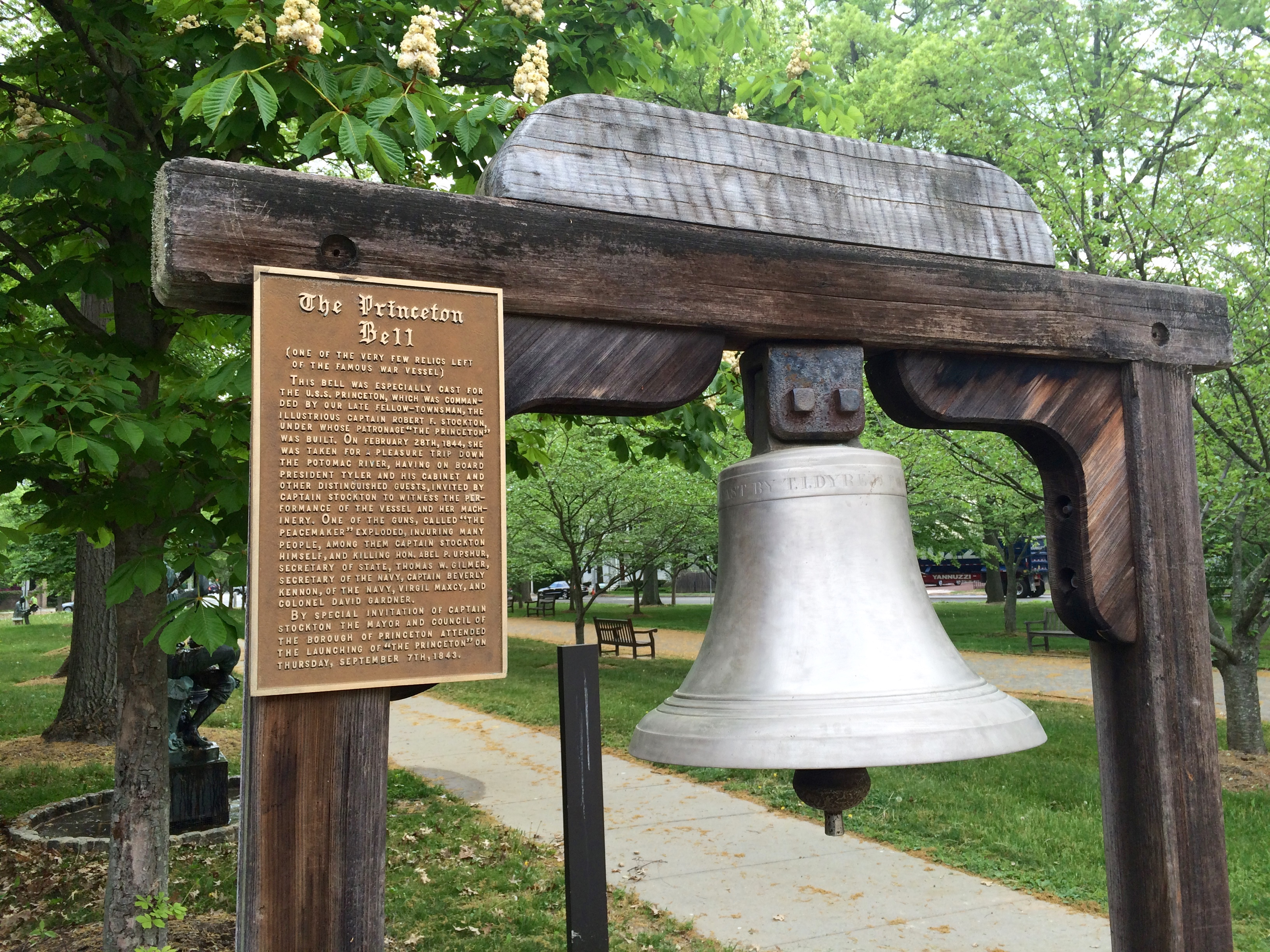
The bell of the first of six ships named USS Princeton in the U.S. Navy, on board which occurred the explosion known as the USS Princeton disaster of 1844

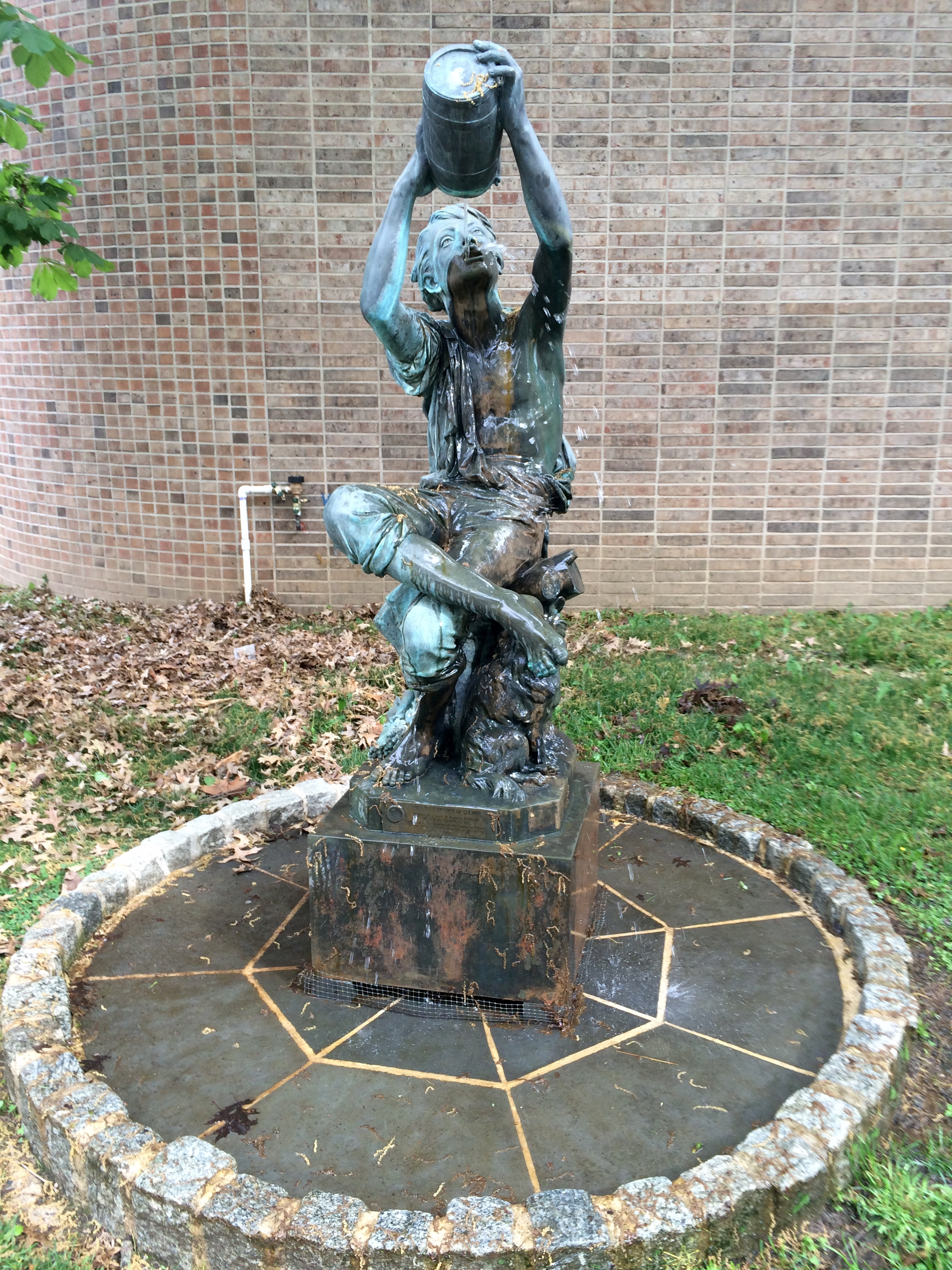
A replica of The Little Vintner of Colmar by Frédéric Auguste Bartholdi, given to Princeton in 1988 by its sister city, Colmar, France

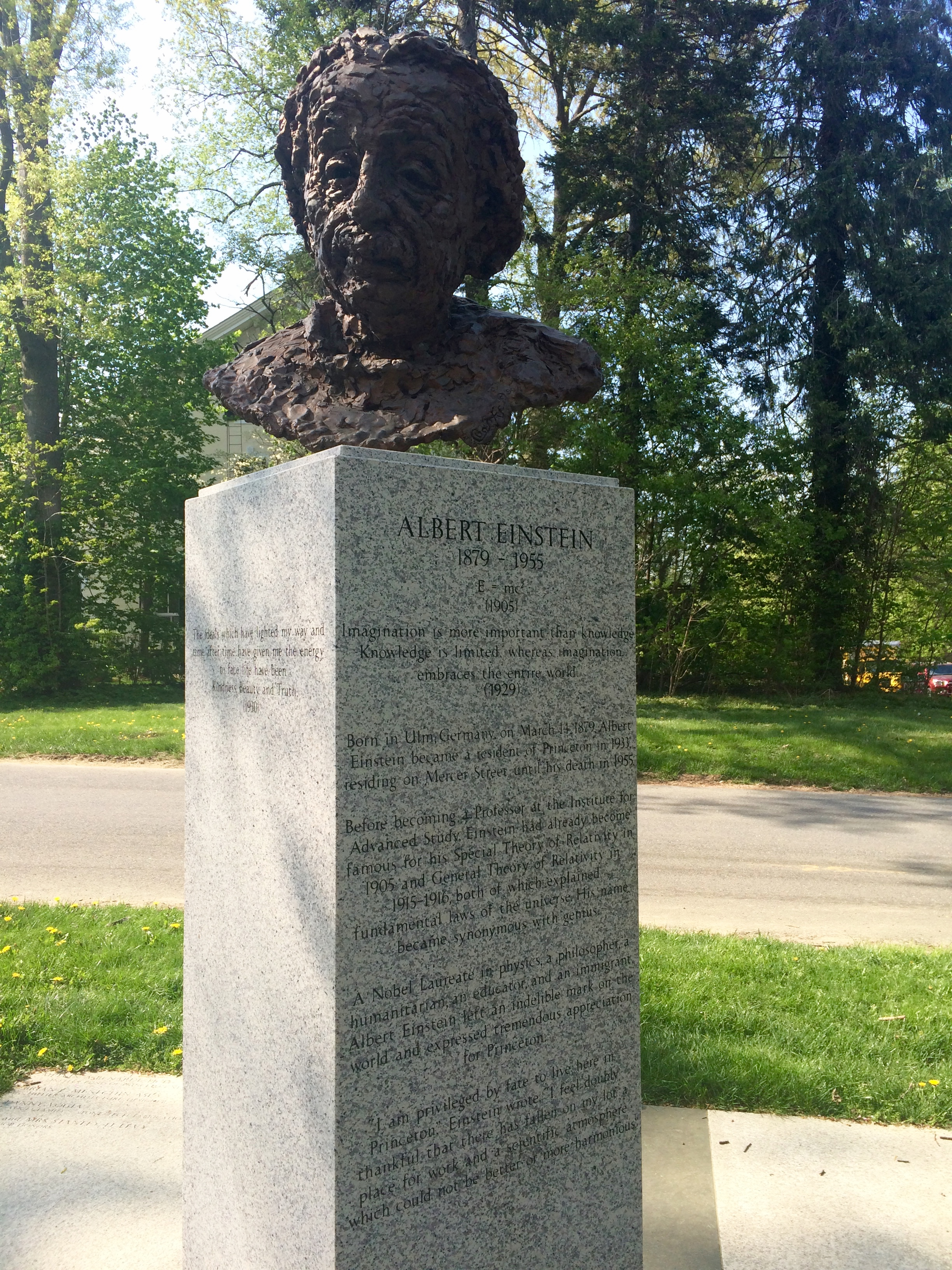
Bust of Albert Einstein, who lived in Princeton from his flight from Germany in 1933 until his death in 1955

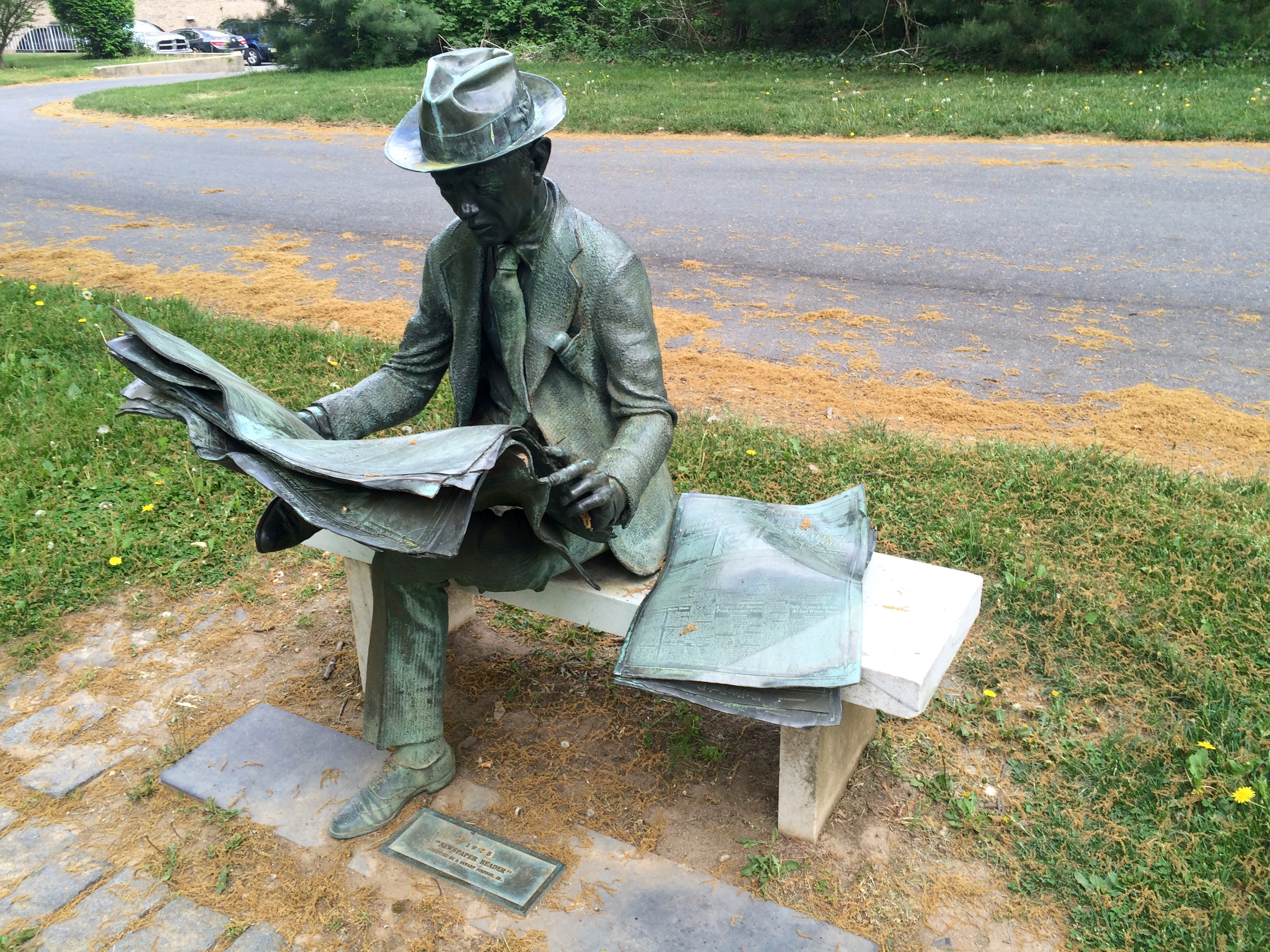
The Newspaper Reader by J. Seward Johnson Jr. (1975)

== See also ==
- Battle of Princeton
- Princeton Historic District
- King's Highway Historic District
- List of statues of George Washington
- List of sculptures of presidents of the United States
