= Finns Party Youth =

Former youth wing of the Finns Party

Finns Party Youth Perussuomalaiset Nuoret
- Founded: 18. January 1997
- Ideology: Ethnic nationalism
- European affiliation: Identity and Democracy Party

Finns Party Youth (Finnish: Perussuomalaiset Nuoret, Swedish: Finsk Ungdom) is the former youth wing of the Finns Party, a political party in Finland. The youth wing was officially founded in 2006. However, Finns Party decided to cut ties with Finns Party Youth due to the ethno nationalist support in the youth wing in 2020. The youth wing went bankrupt in May 2020, due to the cut support. The temporary chair of the new youth wing is Jenna Simula, a current MP.

The current chairperson is Asseri Kinnunen, and the secretary general is Toni Saarinen.

Since 2013 the youth wing has published a magazine titled Rahvas.

In the run-up to the 2019 European elections, the youth wing posted a tweet with an image of a dark-skinned couple holding a baby, with text urging people to vote for the Finns Party "if you don't want Finland's future to look like this".

In 2020, the Finns Party ousted the youth wing's second vice chair, Toni Jalonen, due to statements he made at a conference in Tallinn, Estonia in which he declared himself an ethnic nationalist, a traditionalist and a fascist.

== See also ==
- Sweden Democratic Youth (2015)
- Young Alternative for Germany (2025)
- Blue-and-Black Movement
