= Blue-and-Black Movement =

Blue-and-Black Movement Sinimusta Liike
- Abbreviation: SML
- Chairperson: Tuukka Kuru
- Secretary: Terhi Kiemunki
- Vice-chair: Tapio Rantanen
- Founded: 13 January 2021
- Split from: Finns Party
- Headquarters: Hämeenlinna
- Ideology: Neo-fascism; Ecofascism; Hard Euroscepticism; Ethnonationalism; Remigration
- Political position: Far-right
- Colours: Black; Dark blue

Website
- sinimustaliike.fi

The Blue-and-Black Movement (Finnish: Sinimusta Liike, SML) is a Finnish neo-fascist political party.

The party was born out of a row over ethnonationalism in the Finns Party, which led to the dissolution of the Finns Party Youth and the expulsion of representatives from the party. The party's name and colors have been inspired by the fascist Lapua Movement and Patriotic People's Movement. By April 2022, the party had received the 5,000 signatures needed to register as a political party.

On 23 April 2024, the Supreme Administrative Court of Finland (KHO) annulled the Ministry of Justice's decision to register the Blue-and-Black Movement as a party. The court found that the movement had misled the authorities during registration and that its rules did not ensure adherence to democratic principles. The ruling referred to the Finnish Constitution and the European Convention on Human Rights. The party had modified its party program after registration, restoring objectionable content that had previously been removed.

In May 2024, the Blue-and-Black Movement reapplied for registration as a political party and collected the required 5,000 signatures again before May 2025. The party was registered again on 28 May 2025.

== Ideology ==
The Blue-and-Black Movement has been described as a neo-fascist party. It also defines itself as radical and traditionalist. According to the Helsingin Sanomat election compass, the party is left-wing and national conservative, which according to chairman Tuukka Kuru is accurate.

According to historian Oula Silvennoinen, who is also known for his work on Finnish co-operation with the Nazis during World War Two, the party is ideologically neo-fascist.

=== Foreign and security policy ===
In foreign policy, the Blue-and-Black Movement stands for what it describes as "the principle of state independence" and anti-globalism. The party wishes for Finland to exit the European Union and for Finland to strive for neutrality in foreign conflicts that are not vital to Finland's national interests. The Blue-and-Black Movement also wishes for Finland to exit the United Nations, and for Finland to leave multinational military alliances, such as NATO.

The Blue-and-Black Movement staunchly positions itself as being opposed to Russia and its foreign policy objectives. It seeks closer cooperation with the Baltic countries, Sweden and Poland, instead of commitments to the United States in relation to foreign policy. The Blue-and-Black Movement especially wishes to promote closer ties with Estonia, due to shared Baltic Finnic heritage between Finland and Estonia; this can be seen as Pan-Finnicism to an extent. The party is in favour of cooperation with Ukraine, in its opposition to the Russian Federation.

The party actively supports the political recognition of the State of Palestine, and is opposed to and condemns European politicians that support Israel. The Blue-and-Black Movement claims that Israel is the biggest promoter of migration from developing countries to the Western World, and blames Israel for promoting and causing Islamic extremism and various movements such as Jihadism to become more popular and radical.

The Blue-and-Black Movement wishes to promote the domestic defense industry, and the party is in favour of military conscription for men.

=== Demographic and religious policy ===
The Blue-and-Black Movement is sympathetic to religion, especially to Christianity, which it sees as "preventing nihilism stemming from materialism and people-centeredness". It states that it respects both the integrity of the Orthodox Church of Finland and the Evangelical Lutheran Church of Finland. The Blue-and-Black Movement also wishes to support the study, interpretation and practice of Finnic paganism. The party states that it is in favour of criminalizing religious circumcision and ritual slaughter of animals. The Blue-and-Black Movement is also against the building of mosques and minarets, as the party views them as manifestations of foreign religions in public spaces.

The Blue-and-Black Movement is against bilingualism, and therefore wishes to abandon Pakkoruotsi as well. However, minorities such as the Finland Swedes and the Sámi would still be able to get services in municipalities where they form a sizable population, even if a minority. They wish to remove the status of Åland having its official language as only Swedish-speaking. The Blue-and-Black Movement wishes to redirect subsidies from minority languages, to promoting Finnish language in educational and cultural activities.

The Blue-and-Black Movement wishes to combat the fertility crisis in Finland by encouraging families to have children. The party proposes granting a zero-interest loan which gets paid off as the number of children increases. The party also proposes income-tax reductions with more children. The Blue-and-Black Movement opposes artificial insemination and adoption rights for same-sex couples. The Blue-and-Black Movement also wishes to ban the production, distribution and advertising of pornographic material and to limit access to abortions and hormonal contraception. The Blue-and-Black Movement also wishes to limit the need for immigration. The party wishes to reject humanitarian migrants and to leave international agreements related to migration that they describe as being harmful. The Blue-and-Black Movement also wishes to re-examine permits and citizenships granted since 1990, limit residence permits to a maximum of five years and to introduce a register which monitors the development of the foreign-originated populations.

=== Economic, environmental and monetary policy ===
The Blue-and-Black Movement wishes to abandon the Euro as the currency and instead re-adopt the Markka. The Blue-and-Black Movement wishes to promote self-sufficiency in relation to energy and food production. The party also wishes to curb unemployment and poverty, and wishes to make part-time employment profitable for citizens. The party supports a mixed economy and opposes equalization of incomes and centralization of jobs and services around cities. The Blue-and-Black Movement supports tripartism, in which "the government will negotiate together with employers' and workers' unions and organizations in separate strategies for economic and social policy."

The Blue-and-Black Movement supports the preservation and protection of the Finnish environment, and seeks measures that aim to influence people's spending habits as a way to preserve the environment. The party supports nuclear power alongside renewable energy sources and sees them as viable in a global economy where sanctions are prevalent against nationalist governments. The party is environmentalist and has been described as ecofascist by the Finnish Broadcasting Company, with the party seeking to promote a clean environment for every Finn, with the electrification of transport and mass-adoption of renewable energy, and opposing consumption on a level that the environment cannot sustain.

== Controversies ==
The Ministry of Justice considered the party program so radical and anti-democratic it had to be partially rewritten to be accepted for registration. For example, the party wanted an ethnic register of people living in Finland, to outlaw advocating for a non-traditional family, and to reconsider the citizenship of everyone granted citizenship since 1990. These controversial planks were later re-added to the party program, which caused the Ministry of Justice to request a court to revoke the Blue-and-Black Movement's status as a registered political party.

The party attracted controversy over its opposition to the visible presence of non-Christian religions and statements by chairman Tuukka Kuru about Jews. Kuru described Jews as a distinct ethnic group with a genetic heritage different from that of Europeans, and claimed that their political interests were often in complete conflict with those of the native European population. Yaron Nadbornik, chairman of the Helsinki Jewish Congregation, condemned the comments.

Some members of the Nordic Resistance Movement, a banned terrorist group, are known to be members of the SML, with ex-member electoral candidate Ville Nurmela having been convicted of vandalizing a synagogue in Turku. Eero Molkoselkä, a candidate for the party, had written on X, that “Our racism is the deepest kind. The Jews are one nation which will be deported in blue and black Finland.” The Chairperson of the party, Tuukka Kuru, had written on X in 2020, “Actually, criminalizing Judaism sounds quite good!”, a tweet which he was charged for. Taika Mourujärvi, another candidate for the party, had written on X, that “That is most likely a Jew pretending to be white, in order to spread antiwhite propaganda.”

On 18 June 2024, a 16-year-old neo-Nazi tried to kill a 26-year-old man because of his dark skin color. Finnish police later discovered via a house search that the teenager was a supporter of the Movement and had their materials in his bedroom. The teenager was later deemed mentally ill and sent to a psychiatric hospital.

Following the October 7 attacks, the SML published an article, stating that “Jewish Supremacy is the Common Enemy of All”. Werner Toivonen, the speaker of the SML at events, referred to Israel as a "criminal state" and stated, “There is only one remedy left for Zionism, and that is the merciless sword!” Toni Jalonen, a candidate and leading figure of the party, referred to himself as "a Nazi" and supported the Malmö unrest in reaction to Israel's 2024 Eurovision Song Contest entry on a basis of accelerationism.

In January 2026, party leader Tuukka Kuru and six supporters of the movement were charged with inciting hatred towards minorities. The case concerns a tweet made by Kuru before the 2023 parliamentary election, in which he attacked a parliamentary candidate with a foreign background using the word "foreign species". Six supporters of the Movement shared the tweet.

On 1 May 2026, the movement organised a White May Day event. During the event members of Active club assaulted a counter demonstrator and burned her banner.

== Election results ==
=== Parliament of Finland ===
Election	Votes	%	Seats	+/–	Government
2023	2,307	0.07	0 / 200	New	Extra-parliamentary
