= Rise Above Movement =

US alt-right fight club based in SoCal

- Flag of the RAM
- Other name: DIY Division
- Founder: Robert Rundo
- Founded: 2017
- Headquarters: Southern California
- Ideology: White nationalism; Fascism (US); Neo-Nazism; White supremacy
- Political position: Alt-right
- Size: 20–50 (2018)

The Rise Above Movement (R.A.M.) was an American alt-right militant organization and street fighting group based in Southern California. RAM has variously been described as "a loose collective of violent neo-Nazis and fascists", white nationalists, white supremacists, and far-right persons. According to the Southern Poverty Law Center (SPLC), it "was inspired by identitarian movements in Europe and it was trying to bring their philosophies and violent tactics to the United States." Its members were primarily located in the areas of Orange County and San Diego, and as of 2018, have been variously numbered at 20 to 50.

== History ==
The group was started by Robert Rundo as DIY Division (DIY standing for Do It Yourself) before changing its name in early 2017. It is described as a "militant racist and anti-Semitic group" and sees itself as defending Western civilization, which they claim is being undermined by "Muslims, immigrants and Jews", as well as liberals. Heidi Beirich, Director of the Southern Poverty Law Center's Intelligence Project, said that members of the Rise Above Movement "think they're holding onto the old California, which was white, which was conservative, which was male-run, which was connected to the military ... and now that culture is being lost and they're fighting to bring it back. In other words, it's reactive."

== Purpose ==
According to ProPublica, RAM has "...a singular purpose: physically attacking its ideological foes. RAM's members spend weekends training in boxing and other martial arts, and they have publicly boasted about the acts of violence which they have committed during protests in Huntington Beach, San Bernardino and Berkeley. Many of the altercations have been captured on video ..." Because of its focus on street fighting, it has been described as "less like the Klan and more like a fight club". According to NoCARA:

[It is] a loose collective of violent neo-Nazis and fascists from Southern California that's organized and trains primarily to engage in fighting and violence at political rallies. They have been a central participant in the wave of far-Right protest movements in California during the first half of 2017 which have attempted to mobilize a broad range of right-wing constituents under the banners of protecting so-called "free speech,: unyielding support for Donald Trump, and antipathy towards Muslims, immigrants, and other oppressed groups.

== Organization, funding ==
The group uses social media to recruit members, emphasizing the "fight club" aspect by posting videos of their training sessions, and refers to itself as the "premier MMA [mixed martial arts] club of the Alt-Right." According to the Anti-Defamation League, "While they consider themselves a part of the alt right, R.A.M.'s membership has deep roots in California's racist skinhead movement, and it includes individuals who have faced serious criminal charges, including assault, robbery and weapons offenses."

By January 2021, an Active Club Network largely inspired by RAM had been formed, later developing an active presence in at least 25 states with multiple international chapters.

One way in which the group funds its activities is through the sale of online merchandise.

== Arrests ==
On August 27, 2018, charges were filed by the United States District Court for the Western District of Virginia in Charlottesville, Virginia, against four members of the group in connection to their actions at the Unite the Right rally in Charlottesville in 2017. They were arrested by the FBI, and the charges were unsealed and announced on October 2, 2018. The four California men — Benjamin D. Daley, 25, and Thomas W. Gillen, 25, both of Redondo Beach; Michael P. Miselis, 29, of Lawndale; and Cole E. White, 34, of Clayton — were charged with a single count each of violating the federal rioting statute as well as with conspiring to violate it. They were said to have come to the rally "with the intent to . . . commit violent acts in furtherance of a riot." According to an affidavit, the four men who were charged were "among the most violent individuals present in Charlottesville" for the rally. The charges were not related to the death of Heather Heyer.

On May 3, 2019, Daley and Miselis pled guilty to conspiring to riot, joining the other Rise Above members who had done so earlier. Three of the four were sentenced on July 19: Daley to 37 months, Gillen to 33 months, and Miselis to 27 months. Cole White was to be sentenced at a later date. In August 2020, the unanimous United States Court of Appeals for the Fourth Circuit upheld the convictions of Daley and Miselis because, it found, any unconstitutionally overbroad elements of the Anti-Riot Act were fully severable.

When Miselis was arrested, a search of his house found assault weapon ammunition, smoke bombs and flares, as well as a poster which read "88", code for "Heil Hitler" — "H" being the eighth letter of the alphabet. Miselis had recently met members of violent white supremacist groups in Europe, according to prosecutors.

In October 2018, four other members of the group — Robert Rundo, Robert Boman, Tyler Laube and Aaron Eason — were charged with conspiracy to incite political riots in relation to multiple incidents which occurred in southern California and incidents which occurred during the Unite the Right rally in Charlottesville. Rundo, described as the founder of the group, fled to Mexico and then to Central America, where he was arrested and extradited back to the US. He was arrested at Los Angeles International Airport. A search of his home found a large framed portrait of Adolf Hitler. Boman and Laube were arrested on October 24 in Southern California. Eason surrendered himself on October 29. Beside the Unite the Right rally, the incidents cited took place in Huntington Beach in March 2017 and in UC Berkeley in April 2017. While Laube pled guilty in November 2018, the others were indicted by a grand jury of one count each of violating the Anti-Riot Act of the Civil Rights Act of 1968.

In June 2019, U.S. District Judge Cormac Carney dismissed the indictment because, he held, the Anti-Riot Act is "unconstitutionally overbroad in violation of the First Amendment". In March 2021, that judgment was reversed by a divided panel of the United States Court of Appeals for the Ninth Circuit and the indictments were reinstated.

Robert Rundo, Robert Boman, and Tyler Laube were re-indicted in January 2023.

In early August 2023, Robert Rundo was extradited to the United States from Romania. Rundo had left the U.S. in the time between the dismissal of the charges against him in June 2019, and their reinstatement in January 2023. Rundo pleaded not guilty to the charges of conspiracy and rioting. In March 2025, Boman was convicted of rioting and conspiracy to violate the Anti-Riot Act.
