= List of Finland's presidential candidates by political party =

The first Finnish presidential election was held in 1919. Normally, presidential elections are held every six years.

== Current parliamentary parties ==
=== Centre Party ===
Centre Party (1906–1965 Agrarian League, 1965–1988 Center) candidates

Elections	Candidate	Result
1919	Lauri Kr. Relander	3/4
1925	Lauri Kr. Relander	Victory
1931	Kyösti Kallio	3/4
1937	Kyösti Kallio	Victory
1940	No candidates
1943	No candidates
1946	No candidates
1950	Urho Kekkonen	3/3
1956	Urho Kekkonen	Victory
1962	Urho Kekkonen	Victory
1968	Urho Kekkonen	Victory
1978	Urho Kekkonen	Victory
1982	Johannes Virolainen	3/7
1988	Paavo Väyrynen	2/5 (2/4)
1994	Paavo Väyrynen	3/11
2000	Esko Aho	2/7
2006	Matti Vanhanen	3/8
2012	Paavo Väyrynen	3/8
2018	Matti Vanhanen	5/8

=== National Coalition Party ===
National Coalition Party candidates

Elections	Candidate	Result
1925	Hugo Suolahti	3/6
1931	P. E. Svinhufvud	Victory
1937	P. E. Svinhufvud	2/3
1940	P. E. Svinhufvud	4/4
1943	No candidates
1946	J. K. Paasikivi	Victory
1950	J. K. Paasikivi	Victory
1956	Sakari Tuomioja	4/7
1962	No candidates
1968	Matti Virkkunen	2/3
1978	Urho Kekkonen	Victory
1982	Harri Holkeri	2/8
1988	Harri Holkeri	3/5 (4/4)
1994	Raimo Ilaskivi	4/11
2000	Riitta Uosukainen	3/7
2006	Sauli Niinistö	2/8
2012	Sauli Niinistö	Victory
2018	Sauli Niinistö	Victory

=== Christian Democrats ===
Christian Democrats (1958–2001 Finnish Christian League) candidates

Elections	Candidate	Result
1978	Raino Westerholm	2/4
1982	Raino Westerholm	(No delegates)
1994	Toimi Kankaanniemi	9/11
2006	Bjarne Kallis	6/8
2012	Sari Essayah	8/8
2018	No candidates

=== True Finns ===
True Finns candidates

Elections	Candidate	Result
2000	Ilkka Hakalehto	6/7
2006	Timo Soini	5/8
2012	Timo Soini	4/8
2018	Laura Huhtasaari	3/8

=== Swedish People's Party ===
Swedish People's Party candidates

Elections	Candidate	Result
1919	C. G. E. Mannerheim	2/4
1925	Karl Söderholm	6/6
1931	No candidates
1937	No candidates
1940	No candidates
1943	No candidates
1946	No candidates
1950	J. K. Paasikivi	Victory
1956	Ralf Törngren	6/7
1962	No candidates (Majority).
1962	Urho Kekkonen (Minority)	Victory
1968	Urho Kekkonen	Victory
1978	Urho Kekkonen	Victory
1982	Jan-Magnus Jansson	5/8
1988	No candidates
1994	Elisabeth Rehn	2/11
2000	Elisabeth Rehn	4/7
2006	Henrik Lax	7/8
2012	Eva Biaudet	7/8
2018	Nils Torvalds	8/8

=== Social Democratic Party ===
Social Democratic Party candidates

Elections	Candidate	Result
1919	Väinö Tanner	4/4
1925	Väinö Tanner	5/6
1931	Väinö Tanner	4/4
1937	No candidates
1940	No candidates
1943	No candidates
1946	No candidates
1950	No candidates
1956	K.-A. Fagerholm	2/7
1962	Rafael Paasio	3/4
1968	Urho Kekkonen	Victory
1978	Urho Kekkonen	Victory
1982	Mauno Koivisto	Victory
1988	Mauno Koivisto	Victory
1994	Martti Ahtisaari	Victory
2000	Tarja Halonen	Victory
2006	Tarja Halonen	Victory
2012	Paavo Lipponen	5/8
2018	Tuula Haatainen	6/8

=== Left Alliance ===
Left Alliance candidates

Elections	Candidate	Result
1994	Claes Andersson	6/11
2006	Tarja Halonen	Victory
2012	Paavo Arhinmäki	6/8
2018	Merja Kyllönen	7/8

=== Green League ===
Green League candidates

Elections	Candidate	Result
2000	Heidi Hautala	5/7
2006	Heidi Hautala	4/8
2012	Pekka Haavisto	2/8
2018	Pekka Haavisto	2/8

== Other ==
=== Democratic Alternative ===
Democratic Alternative candidates

Elections	Candidate	Result
1988	Jouko Kajanoja	5/5 (No delegates)

=== National Progressive Party ===
National Progressive Party candidates

Elections	Candidate	Result
1919	K. J. Ståhlberg	Victory
1925	Risto Ryti	2/6
1931	Risto Ryti	2/4
1937	K. J. Ståhlberg	3/3
1940	Risto Ryti	Victory
1940	Toivo Kivimäki	(3/4)
1943	Risto Ryti	Victory
1946	K. J. Ståhlberg
1950	Juho Kusti Paasikivi	Victory

=== Patriotic People's Movement ===
Patriotic People's Movement candidates

Elections	Candidate	Result
1937	P. E. Svinhufvud	2/4)

=== Liberal People's Party ===
Liberal People's Party candidates

Elections	Candidate	Result
1982	Helvi Sipilä	(7/8)

=== Constitutional Right Party ===
Constitutional Right Party candidates

Elections	Candidate	Result
1978	Ahti M. Salonen	(4/4)

=== Reform Group ===
Reform Group candidates

Elections	Candidate	Result
2000	Risto Kuisma	(7/7)

=== People's Democratic League ===
People's Democratic League candidates

Elections	Candidate	Result
1950	Mauno Pekkala	(2/3)
1956	Eino Kilpi	(5/7)
1962	Paavo Aitio	(2/4)
1968	Urho Kekkonen	Victory
1978	Urho Kekkonen	Victory
1982	Kalevi Kivistö	(4/7)

=== People's Unity Party ===
People's Unity Party candidates

Elections	Candidate	Result
1978	Eino Haikala	(No delegates)
1982	Raino Westerholm	(No delegates)

=== Movement 88 ===
Movement 88 candidates

Elections	Candidate	Result
1988	Kalevi Kivistö	(3/4)

=== Rural Party ===
Rural Party candidates

Elections	Candidate	Result
1968	Veikko Vennamo	(3/3)
1978	Veikko Vennamo	(3/4)
1982	Veikko Vennamo	(6/7)
1988	Mauno Koivisto	Victory
1994	Sulo Aittoniemi	(10/11)

=== Socialist parliament group ===
Socialist parliament group candidates

Elections	Candidate	Result
1940	Johan Helo	(2/4)

=== Socialist Workers and Smallholders Group ===
Socialist Workers and Smallholders Group candidates

Elections	Candidate	Result
1925	Matti Väisänen	(4/6)

=== People's Party ===
People's Party's candidates

Elections	Candidate	Result
1956	Eero Rydman	(7/7)
1956	Urho Kekkonen	Victory (Majority)
1962	Urho Kekkonen	Victory (Majority)

=== Social Democratic Union of Workers and Smallholders ===
Social Democratic Union of Workers and Smallholders candidates

Elections	Candidate	Result
1962	Emil Skog	(4/4)

=== Liberal League ===
Liberal League candidates

Elections	Candidate	Result
1956	Sakari Tuomioja	(4/7)

== Independents ==
Independent candidates

Elections	Candidate	Result
1919	C. G. E. Mannerheim	2/4
1943	Väinö Kotilainen	4/7
1994	Keijo Korhonen	5/11
1994	Pertti Virtanen	7/11
1994	Eeva Kuuskoski	8/11
1994	Pekka Tiainen	11/11
2006	Arto Lahti	8/8
2018	Sauli Niinistö	Victory
