= List of candidates in Finnish presidential elections =

The first Finnish presidential election was held in 1919. For further information: 1919 Finnish presidential election. Presidential elections have been held every 6 years thereafter.

Candite	Election year	Party	Result
Alexander Stubb	2024	National Coalition Party	Victory
Pekka Haavisto	2024	Independent (Green League)	
Pekka Haavisto	2018	Green league	
Esko Aho	2000	Centre Party	2. kierroksella 2/2
Martti Ahtisaari	1994	Social Democratic Party	Victory
Sulo Aittoniemi	1994	Finnish Rural Party	10/11
Paavo Aitio	1962	Finnish People's Democratic League	2/4
Claes Andersson	1994	Left Alliance	6/11
Paavo Arhinmäki	2012	Left Alliance	6/8
Eva Biaudet	2012	Swedish People's Party	7/8
Sari Essayah	2012	Christian Democrats	8/8
Karl-August Fagerholm	1956	Social Democratic Party	2/2 (3.round)
Pekka Haavisto	2012	Greens	2/8
Eino Haikala	1978	Finnish People's Unity Party	No delegate votes
Ilkka Hakalehto	2000	True Finns	6/7
Tarja Halonen	2000	Social Democratic Party	Victory
Tarja Halonen	2006	Social Democratic Party/Left Alliance	Victory
Heidi Hautala	2000	Greens	5/7
Heidi Hautala	2006	Greens	4/8
Johan Helo	1940	Socialist parliament Group	2/4
Harri Holkeri	1982	National Coalition Party	4/5
Harri Holkeri	1988	National Coalition Party	2/8
Raimo Ilaskivi	1994	National Coalition Party	4/11
Jan-Magnus Jansson	1982	Swedish People's Party	5/8
Jouko Kajanoja	1988	Democratic Alternative	5/5
Kyösti Kallio	1931	Agrarian League	3/4
Kyösti Kallio	1937	Agrarian League	Victory
Bjarne Kallis	2006	Christian Democrats	6/8
Toimi Kankaanniemi	1994	Christian Democrats	9/11
Urho Kekkonen	1950	Agrarian League	3/3
Urho Kekkonen	1956	Agrarian League	Victory
Urho Kekkonen	1962	Agrarian League	Victory
Urho Kekkonen	1962	People's Party of Finland (Majority)	Victory
Urho Kekkonen	1962	Swedish People's Party (Minority)	Victory
Urho Kekkonen	1968	Center Party	Victory
Urho Kekkonen	1968	Finnish People's Democratic League	Victory
Urho Kekkonen	1968	Social Democratic Party	Victory
Urho Kekkonen	1968	Social Democratic Union of Workers and Smallholders	Victory
Urho Kekkonen	1968	Swedish People's Party	Victory
Urho Kekkonen	1973 (elected by emergency law)	Center Party, Social Democratic Party, National Coalition Party; Swedish People's Party; Liberal People's Party, Finnish People's Democratic League	Victory
Urho Kekkonen	1978	Center Party	Victory
Urho Kekkonen	1978	Social Democratic Party	Victory
Urho Kekkonen	1978	Finnish People's Democratic League	Victory
Urho Kekkonen	1978	National Coalition Party	Victory
Urho Kekkonen	1978	Liberal People's Party	Victory
Urho Kekkonen	1978	Åländsk Samling	Victory
Urho Kekkonen	1978	Socialist Workers Party	Victory
Urho Kekkonen	1978	Entrepreneur Party	Victory
Eino Kilpi	1956	Finnish People's Democratic League	5/7
Toivo Kivimäki	1940	National Progressive Party	3/4
Kalevi Kivistö	1982	Finnish People's Democratic League	4/6 (2. round)
Kalevi Kivistö	1988	Movement 88	3/4 (2. round)
Mauno Koivisto	1982	Social Democratic Party	Victory
Mauno Koivisto	1988	Social Democratic Party, Finnish Rural Party, Pro Koivisto, Åländsk Samling	Victory
Keijo Korhonen	1994	Non-partisan	5/11
Väinö Kotilainen	1943	Non-partisan	2/2
Risto Kuisma	2000	Reform Group	7/7
Eeva Kuuskoski	1994	Non-partisan	8/11
Arto Lahti	2006	Non-partisan	8/8
Henrik Lax	2006	Swedish People's Party	7/8
Paavo Lipponen	2012	Social Democratic Party	5/8
Carl Gustaf Emil Mannerheim	1919	National Coalition Party	2/4
Carl Gustaf Emil Mannerheim	1919	Swedish People's Party	2/4
Carl Gustaf Emil Mannerheim	1944 (elected by emergency law)	Non-partisan	Victory
Sauli Niinistö	2006	National Coalition Party	2/2 (2. round)
Sauli Niinistö	2012	National Coalition Party	Victory
Sauli Niinistö	2018	Independent	
Juho Kusti Paasikivi	1946	National Coalition Party	Victory
Juho Kusti Paasikivi	1950	National Coalition Party	Victory
Juho Kusti Paasikivi	1950	Swedish People's Party	Victory
Juho Kusti Paasikivi	1950	Liberal Swedish Party	Victory
Juho Kusti Paasikivi	1950	National Progressive Party	Victory
Juho Kusti Paasikivi	1950	Independent Middleclass	Victory
Juho Kusti Paasikivi	1950	Small Farmers Party	Victory
Juho Kusti Paasikivi	1956 (unofficial candidate)	National Coalition Party	3/3 (2. round)
Rafael Paasio	1962	Social Democratic Party	3/4
Mauno Pekkala	1950	Finnish People's Democratic League	2/3
Elisabeth Rehn	1994	Swedish People's Party	2/2 (2. round)
Elisabeth Rehn	2000	Swedish People's Party	4/7
Lauri Kristian Relander	1919	Agrarian League	3/4
Lauri Kristian Relander	1925	Agrarian League	Victory
Eero Rydman	1956	People's Party of Finland	7/7
Risto Ryti	1925	National Progressive Party	2/2 (3. round)
Risto Ryti	1940	National Progressive Party	Victory
Risto Ryti	1943	National Progressive Party	Victory
Ahti M. Salonen	1978	Constitutional People's Party	4/4
Helvi Sipilä (first female candidate)	1982	Liberal People's Party	7/7
Emil Skog	1962	Social Democratic Union of Workers and Smallholders	4/4
Timo Soini	2006	True Finns	5/8
Timo Soini	2012	True Finns	4/8
K. J. Ståhlberg	1919	National Progressive Party	Victory
K. J. Ståhlberg	1931	National Progressive Party	2/2 (3. round)
K. J. Ståhlberg	1937	National Progressive Party	3/3 (2. round)
K. J. Ståhlberg	1937	Small Farmers' Party of Finland	3/3 (2. round)
K. J. Ståhlberg	1937	People's Party	3/3 (2. round)
K. J. Ståhlberg	1937	Liberal Swedish Party	3/3 (2. round)
K. J. Ståhlberg	1946	National Progressive Party	2/2
Hugo Suolahti	1925	National Coalition Party	3/6
Pehr Evind Svinhufvud	1931	National Coalition Party	Victory
Pehr Evind Svinhufvud	1937	Patriotic People's Movement	2/3 (2. round)
Pehr Evind Svinhufvud	1940	National Coalition Party	4/4
Karl Söderholm	1925	Swedish People's Party	6/6
Väinö Tanner	1919	Social Democratic Party	4/4
Väinö Tanner	1925	Social Democratic Party	5/5 (2. round)
Väinö Tanner	1931	Social Democratic Party	4/4
Pekka Tiainen	1994	Communist Workers' Party	11/11
Sakari Tuomioja	1956	National Coalition Party	4/7
Sakari Tuomioja	1956	Liberal League	4/7
Ralf Törngren	1956	Swedish People's Party	6/7
Riitta Uosukainen	2000	National Coalition Party	3/7
Matti Vanhanen	2006	Centre Party	3/8
Veikko Vennamo	1968	Finnish Rural Party	3/3
Veikko Vennamo	1978	Finnish Rural Party	3/4
Veikko Vennamo	1982	Finnish Rural Party	6/7
Raino Westerholm	1978	Christian Democrats	2/4
Raino Westerholm	1982	Christian Democrats	No delegate votes
Matti Virkkunen	1968	National Coalition Party	2/3
Veltto Virtanen	1994	Non-partisan	7/11
Johannes Virolainen	1982	Keskustapuolue	3/6 (2. round)
Matti Väisänen	1925	Socialist Workers and Smallholders election organization	2. kierroksella 4/5
Paavo Väyrynen	1988	Centre Party	2. kierros 2/4
Paavo Väyrynen	1994	Centre Party	3/11
Paavo Väyrynen	2012	Centre Party	3/8
