= Juho Kuittinen =

Finnish politician (1889–1956)

Johannes (Juho) Kuittinen (21 August 1889 – 12 June 1956) was a Finnish politician, born in Jääski. He was a member of the Parliament of Finland from 1934 until his death in 1956, representing the Social Democratic Party of Finland (SDP). He was a presidential elector in the 1931, 1937, 1940, 1943, 1950 and 1956 presidential elections. In 1918, Kuittinen was imprisoned for having sided with the Reds during the Finnish Civil War.
