= Viljo Rantala =

Finnish smallholder and politician (1892–1980)

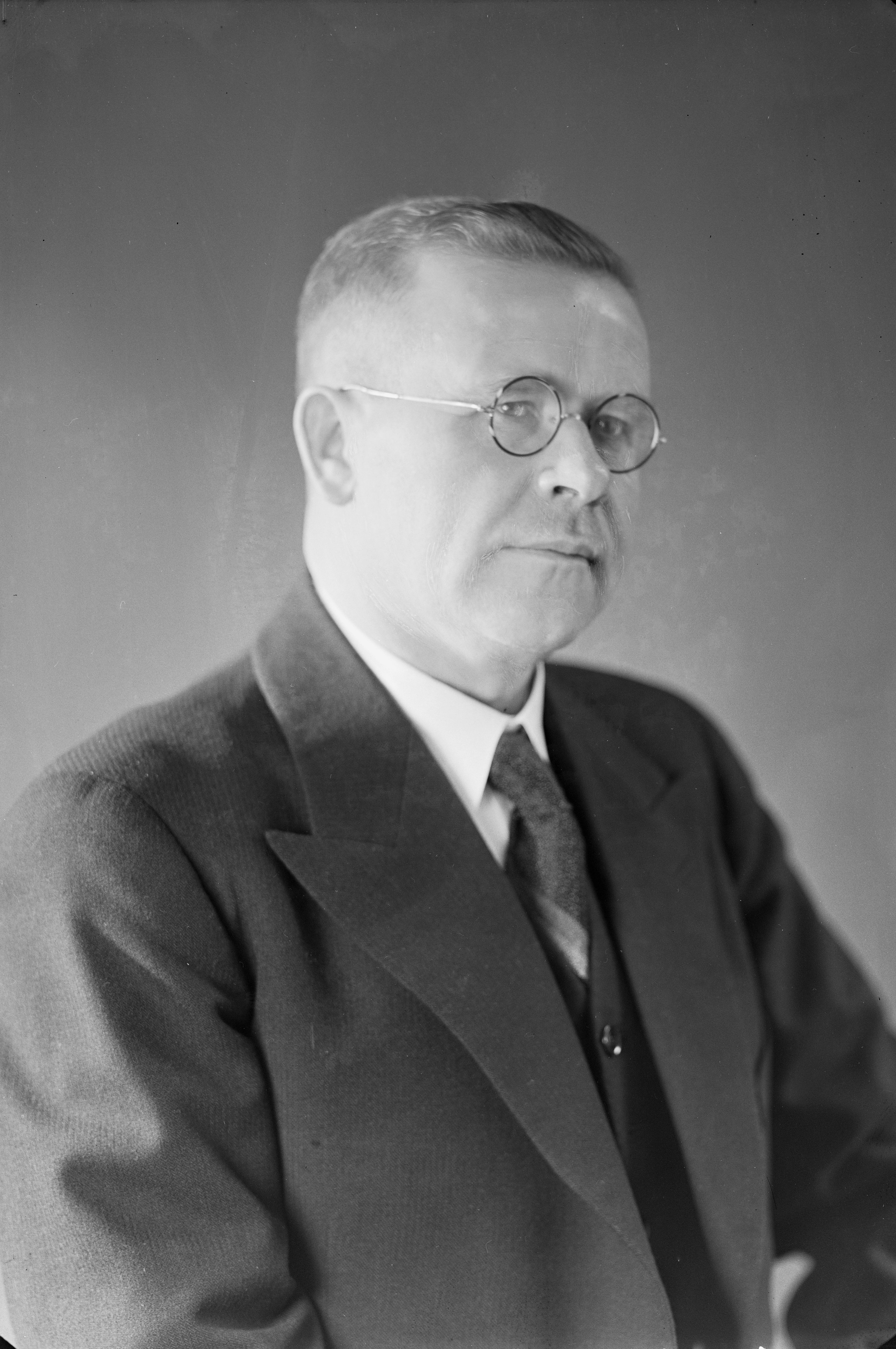
Viljo Rantala in 1937

Viljo Johannes Rantala (18 November 1892 – 31 December 1980) was a Finnish smallholder and politician, born in Punkalaidun. He was a member of the Parliament of Finland from 1922 to 1962, representing the Social Democratic Party of Finland (SDP). He served as Minister of Finance from 20 September 1951 to 9 July 1953. He was a presidential elector in the 1925, 1931, 1937, 1940, 1943, 1950, 1956 and 1962 presidential elections. After the Finnish Civil War of 1918, Rantala was given a life prison sentence for having belonged to the Red Guard. However, in 1921, he was pardoned and could resume his political activities.
