= Toivo Tyrni =

Finnish physician and politician (1890–1966)

Toivo Tyrni (21 December 1890 – 15 July 1966) was a Finnish physician and politician, born in Tuulos. He was a member of the Parliament of Finland from 1933 to 1935 and from 1947 to 1948, representing the National Progressive Party. After the National Progressive Party ceased to exist in 1951, Tyrni joined the People's Party of Finland. He was a presidential elector in the 1931, 1937, 1940, 1943 and 1950 presidential elections.
