= Yrjö Hirvensalo =

Finnish pharmacist and politician (1888–1954)

Yrjö Hirvensalo (28 June 1888 – 10 December 1954; surname until 1906 Lagus) was a Finnish pharmacist and politician, born in Varkaus. He was a member of the Parliament of Finland from 1938 to 1939, representing the National Coalition Party. He was a presidential elector in the 1937, 1940 and 1943 presidential elections.
