= Gustaf Gädda =

Finnish farmer and politician (1871–1942)

Gustaf Gädda (28 April 1871 – 14 February 1942) was a Finnish farmer and politician, born in Korsholm. He was a member of the Diet of Finland from 1904 to 1905 and from 1905 to 1906 and of the Parliament of Finland from 1910 to 1919, representing the Swedish People's Party of Finland. He was a presidential elector in the 1931, 1937 and 1940 presidential elections.
