= Yrjö Schildt =

Finnish military officer, farmer and politician (1899–1961)

Wolmar Yrjö Wilhelmi Schildt (31 July 1899 – 5 February 1961) was a Finnish military officer, farmer and politician, born in Jyväskylä. He was a member of the Parliament of Finland, representing the Patriotic People's Movement (IKL) from 1933 to 1936 and the Agrarian League from 1939 to 1945. He was a presidential elector in the 1937, 1940 and 1943 presidential elections.
