= Tauno Saukkonen =

Finnish farmer and politician (1902–1965)

Tauno Saukkonen (30 January 1902 – 23 September 1965) was a Finnish farmer and politician, born in Parikkala. He was a member of the Parliament of Finland from 1939 to 1948, representing the Agrarian League. He was a presidential elector in the 1937, 1940 and 1943 presidential elections.
