= Martti Honkavaara =

Finnish jurist, civil servant and politician (1910–1965)

Martti Ilmari (Martti I.) Honkavaara (27 February 1910 – 26 February 1965) was a Finnish jurist, civil servant and politician, born in Ilmajoki. He was a member of the Parliament of Finland from 1957 to 1958, representing the Agrarian League. He was a presidential elector in the 1950 and 1956 presidential elections.
