= Toivo Nokelainen =

Finnish smallholder and politician (1887–1954)

Toivo Nokelainen (27 December 1887 – 30 July 1954) was a Finnish smallholder and politician, born in Ruokolahti. He was a member of the Parliament of Finland from 1935 to 1936 and from 1939 to 1945, representing the Social Democratic Party of Finland (SDP). He was a presidential elector in the 1937, 1940 and 1943 presidential elections.
