= Elli Nurminen =

Finnish politician (1899–1987)

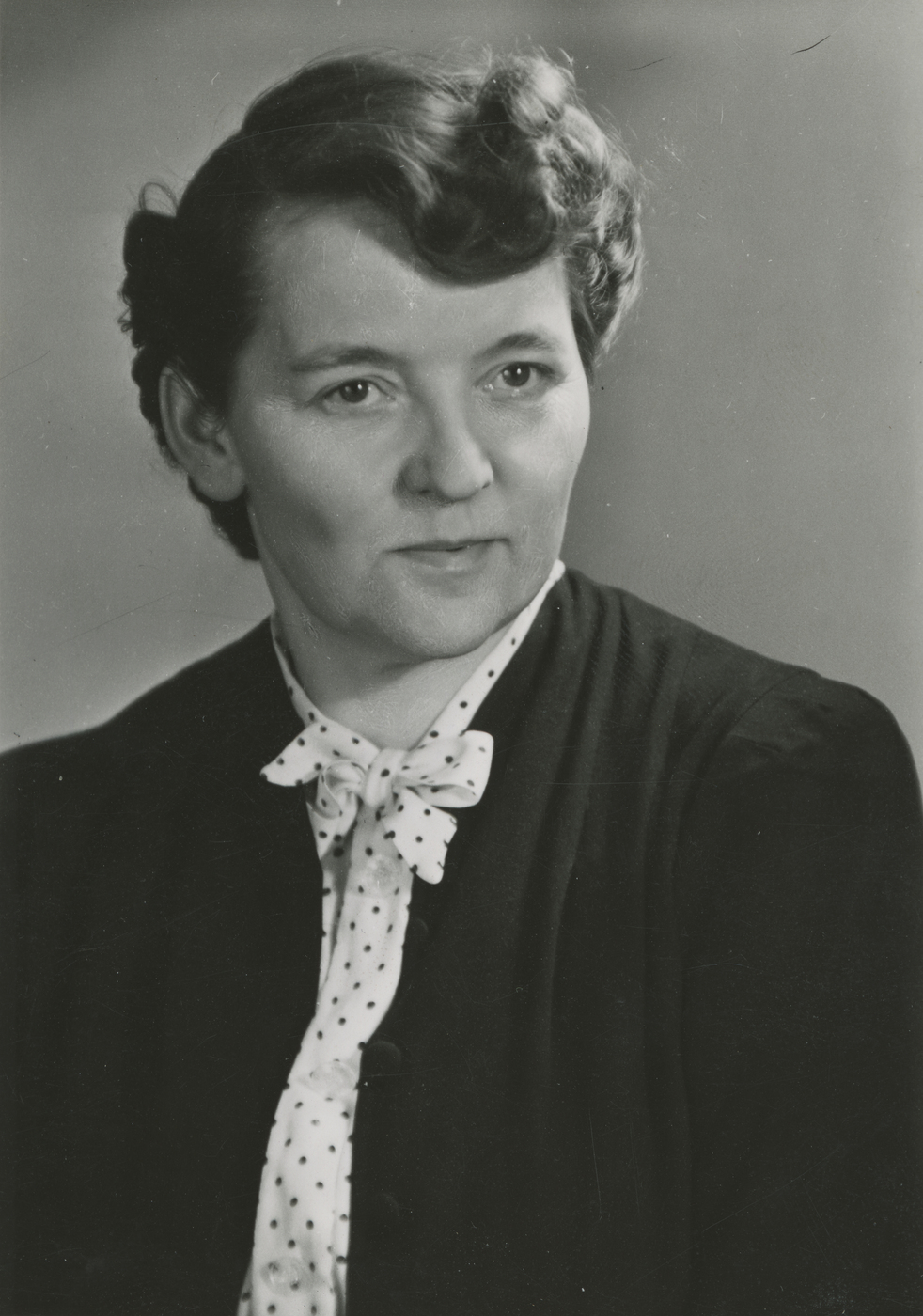
Elli Nurminen

Elli Helena Nurminen (19 January 1899 – 26 June 1987; née Jakobsson) was a Finnish politician, born in Lempäälä. She was a member of the Parliament of Finland from 1941 to 1944 and from 1945 to 1958, representing the Social Democratic Party of Finland (SDP). After the SDP split in 1959, she joined the Social Democratic Union of Workers and Smallholders (TPSL). She was a presidential elector in the 1950 and 1956 presidential elections. She served in the Finnish Civil War of 1918 as a field nurse on the Red side. After the war, she was given a prison sentence of four years for having served on the Red side.
