= Johannes Storbjörk =

Finnish farmer and politician (1872–1939)

Johannes Storbjörk (27 September 1872 – 2 November 1939) was a Finnish farmer and politician, born in Kronoby. He was a member of the Parliament of Finland from 1916 to 1917, representing the Swedish People's Party of Finland. He was a presidential elector in the 1925, 1931 and 1937 presidential elections. Johannes Storbjörk was the son of Johan Storbjörk.
