= Irma Hamara =

Finnish agronomist and politician (1904–1989)

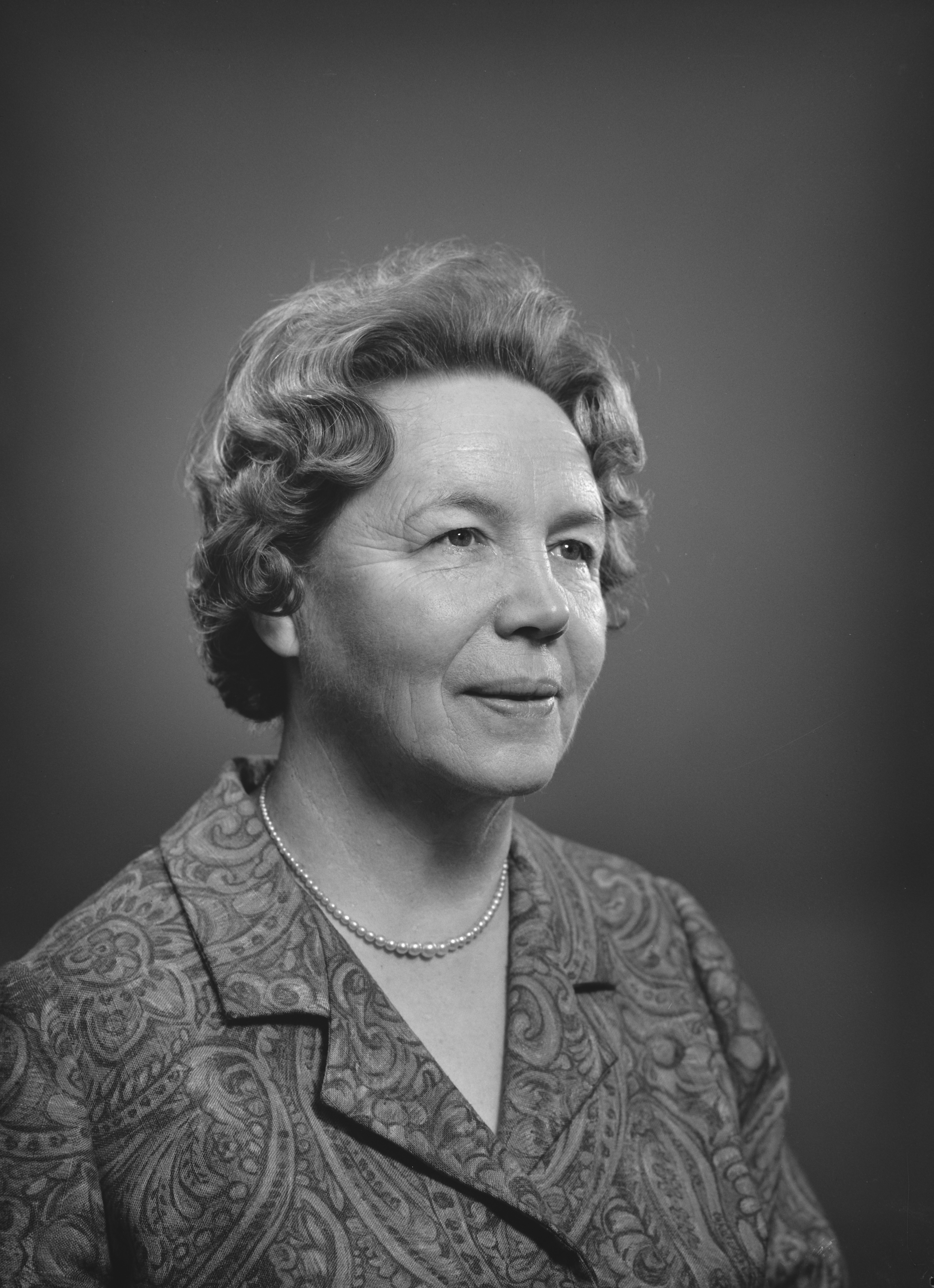
Irma Hamara, 1966

Irma Elisabeth Hamara (22 January 1904 – 9 June 1989; surname until 1905 Hammarén) was a Finnish agronomist and politician, born in Nastola. She was a member of the Parliament of Finland from 1948 to 1958 and from 1962 to 1970, representing the National Coalition Party. She was a presidential elector in the 1950, 1956 and 1962 presidential elections.
