= Teuvo Kaitila =

Finnish farmer, bank director and politician (1873–1937)

Johan Teodor (Teuvo) Kaitila (30 August 1873 – 7 March 1937) was a Finnish farmer, bank director and politician, born in Orimattila. He was a member of the Parliament of Finland from 1917 to 1919, representing the Young Finnish Party until 9 December 1918 the National Progressive Party after that. He was a presidential elector in the 1925, 1931 and 1937 presidential elections.
