= Kilpi (surname) =

Kilpi is a Finnish language surname which means "shield", most prevalent in Tavastia Proper. Notable people with the surname include:

- Eero Kilpi (1882–1954), Finnish actor
- Eeva Kilpi (1928–2026), Finnish writer and feminist
- Eino Kilpi (1889–1963), Finnish journalist and politician
- Marko Kilpi (born 1969), Finnish crime writer, police officer and politician
- Sylvi-Kyllikki Kilpi (1899–1987), Finnish journalist, literary critic and politician
- Volter Kilpi (1874–1939), Finnish author
