= Eero Rydman =

Finnish jurist and politician (1889–1963)

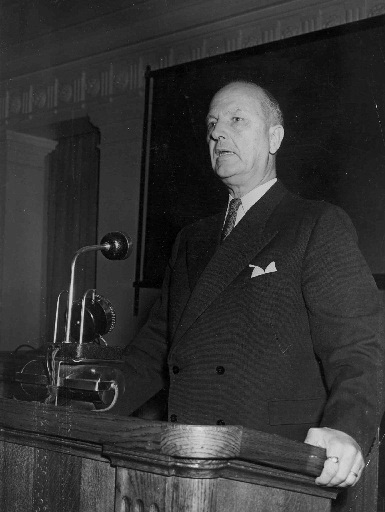
Eero Rydman

Hjalmar Erik (Eero Hjalmar) Rydman (19 August 1889 – 15 June 1963) was a Finnish jurist and politician, born in Turku.

== Professional career ==
He was a member of the Parliament of Finland from 1927 to 1929 and from 1933 to 1936, representing the National Progressive Party. After the National Progressive Party ceased to exist in 1951, Rydman joined the People's Party of Finland. He was the presidential candidate of the People's Party of Finland in the 1956 Finnish presidential election.

From 1937 to 1944, Rydman was the Director General of Kela. He was the mayor of Helsinki from 1944 to 1956. He was a presidential elector in the 1931, 1937, 1940 and 1943 presidential elections.

== Personal life ==
Eero Rydman was the younger brother of Heikki Ritavuori and the uncle of Pekka Tarjanne.
