= 1940 presidential election =

1940 presidential election may refer to:

- 1940 Bolivian presidential election
- 1940 Finnish presidential election
- 1940 Mexican presidential election
- 1940 United States presidential election
