= Nokelainen =

Nokelainen is a surname. Notable people with the surname include:

- Petteri Nokelainen (born 1986), Finnish ice hockey player
- Toivo Nokelainen (1887–1954), Finnish smallholder and politician
