= August Tåg =

Finnish farmer and politician (1871–1959)

Josef August Tåg (16 August 1871 – 1 February 1959) was a Finnish farmer and politician, born in Närpes. He served as a member of the Parliament of Finland from 1911 to 1919 and again from 1927 to 1929, representing the Swedish People's Party of Finland. He was a presidential elector in the 1943 Finnish presidential election.
