= Johan Storbjörk =

Finnish farmer and politician (1853–1932)

Johan Storbjörk (16 April 1852 – 7 March 1932) was a Finnish farmer and politician, born in Kronoby. He was a member of the Parliament of Finland from 1907 to 1916, representing the Swedish People's Party of Finland. He was the father of Johannes Storbjörk.
