= Sylvi-Kyllikki Kilpi =

Finnish politician

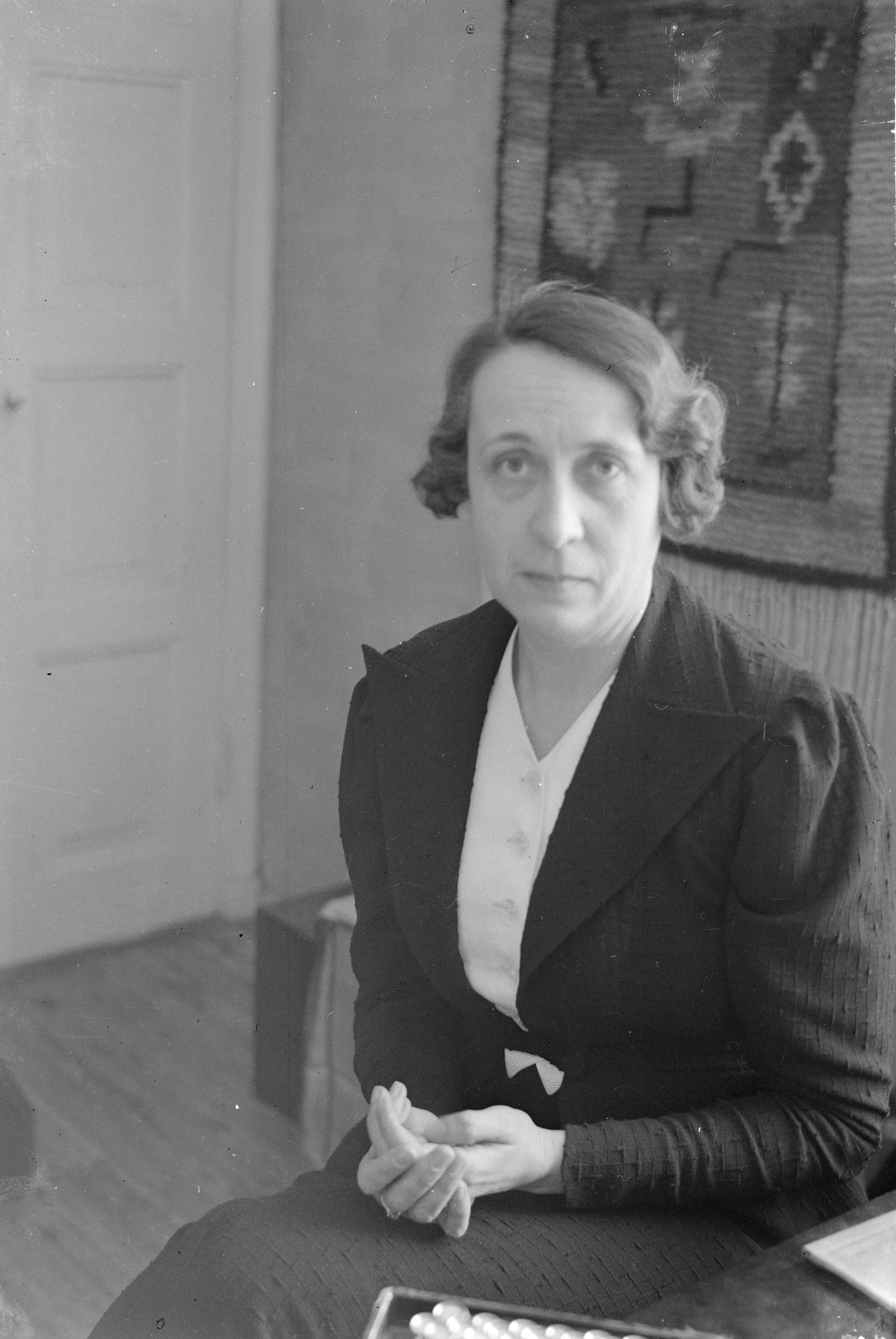
Sylvi-Kyllikki Kilpi in 1937.

Sylvi-Kyllikki Kilpi (née Sylvia-Kyllikki Brink, later Sinervo; 23 April 1899 in Helsinki – 22 February 1987 in Helsinki) was a Finnish journalist, literary critic and politician. She was a member of the Parliament of Finland, representing the Social Democratic Party of Finland (SDP) from 1934 to 1946 and the Finnish People's Democratic League (SKDL) from 1946 to 1958. She was a member of the peace opposition during the Continuation War. In September 1946 she resigned her membership in the SDP and joined the Socialist Unity Party (SYP), a member organisation of the SKDL. She was married to Eino Kilpi. Kilpi was elected to the Women's International Democratic Federation Executive Council in 1953
