= 1919 Finnish presidential election =

- 25 July 1919
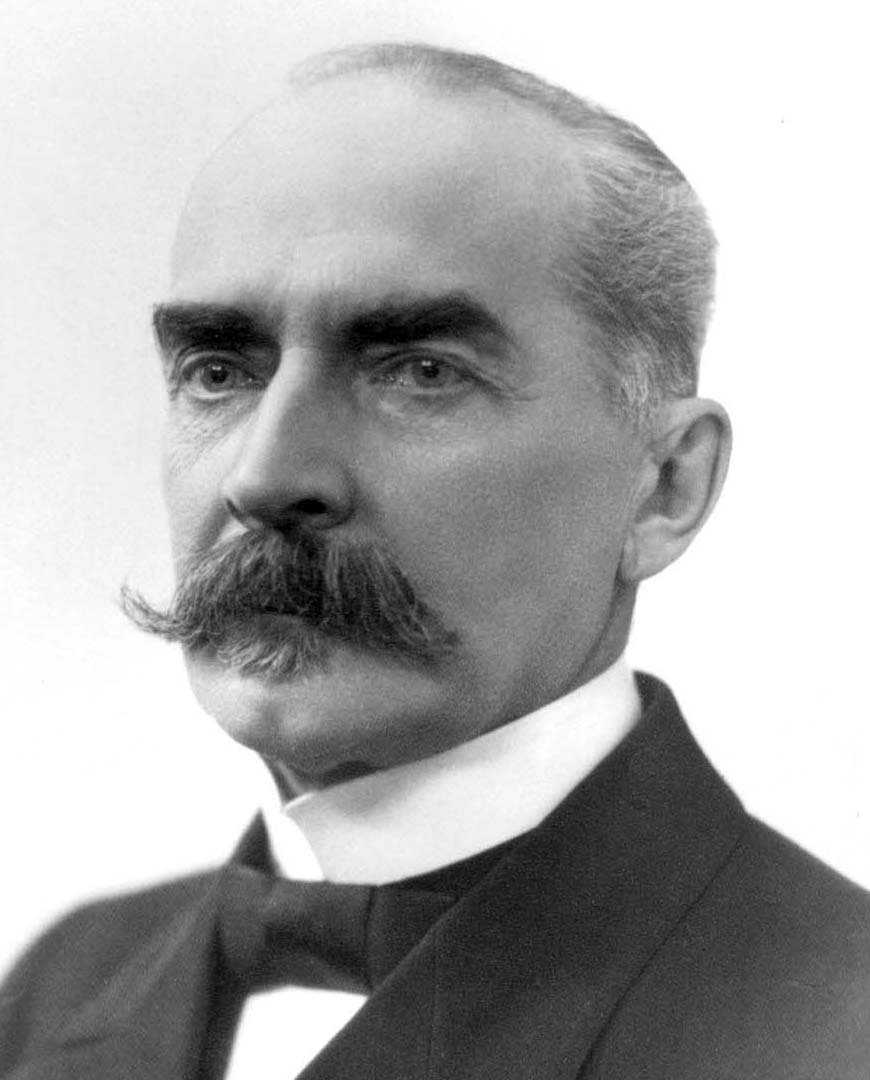

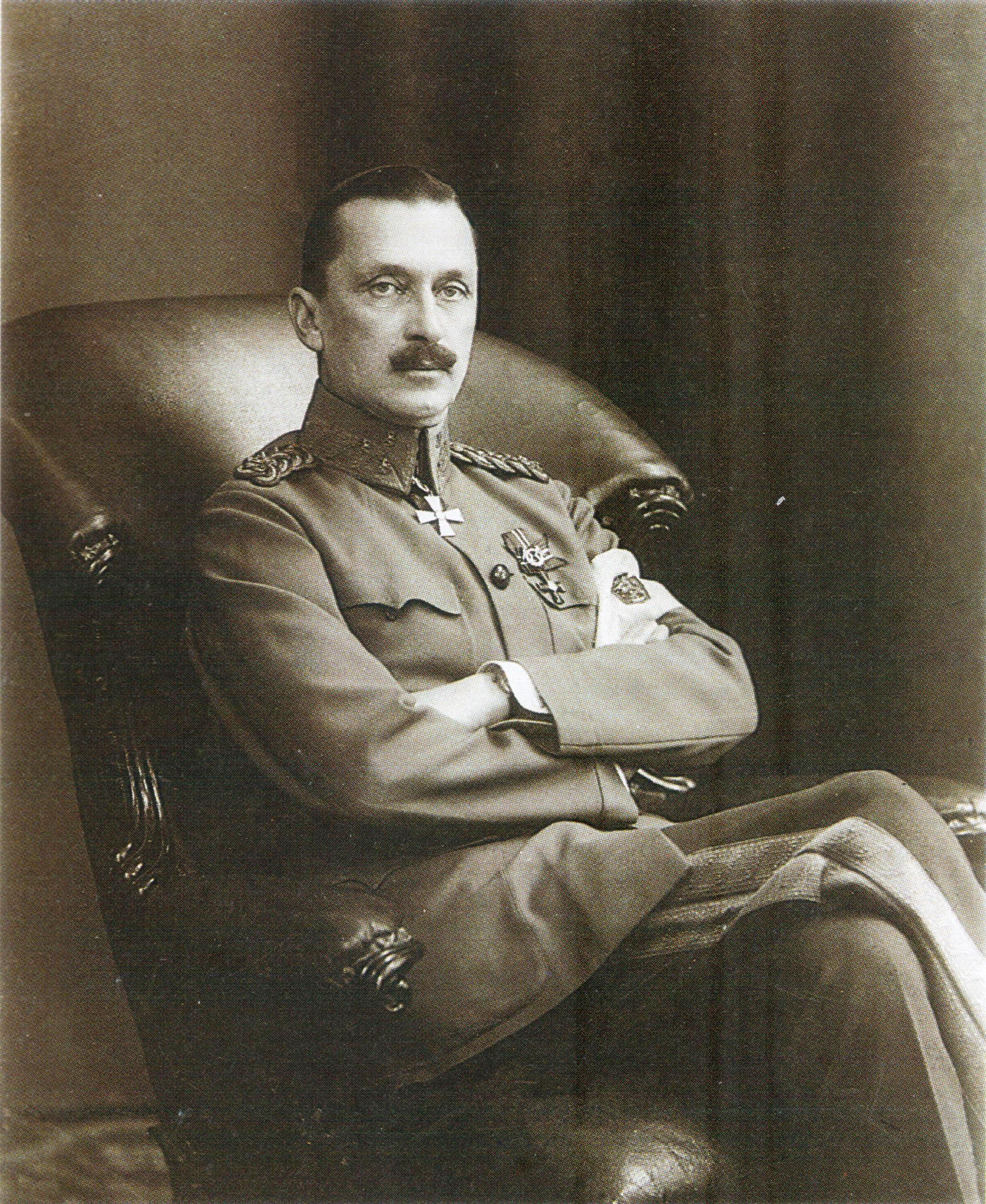
Candidate	Kaarlo Juho Ståhlberg	Carl Gustaf Emil Mannerheim
Party	National Progressive	Independent
Electoral vote	143	50
President before election
Office established
Elected President
Kaarlo Juho Ståhlberg
National Progressive

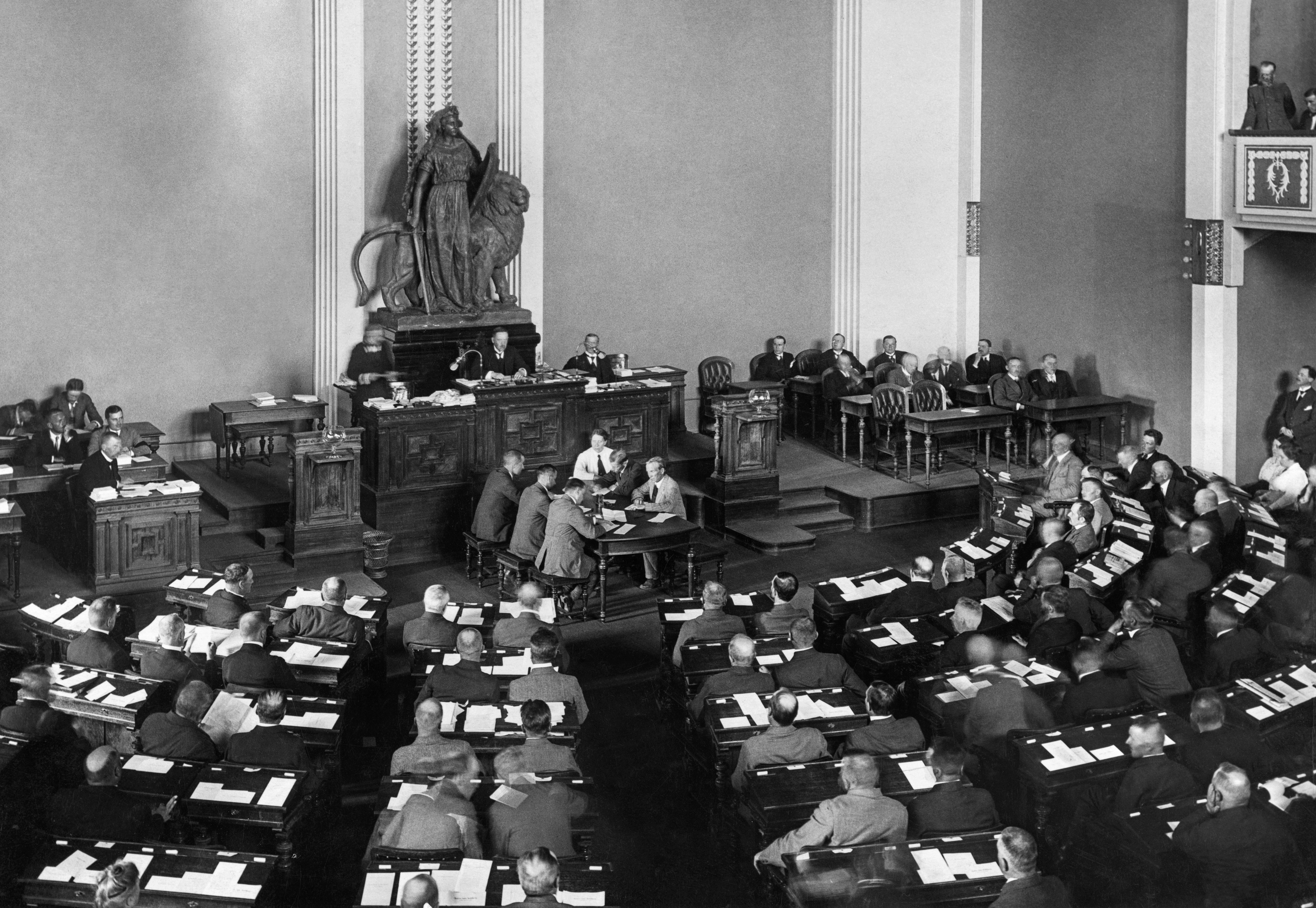
The presidential election taking place.

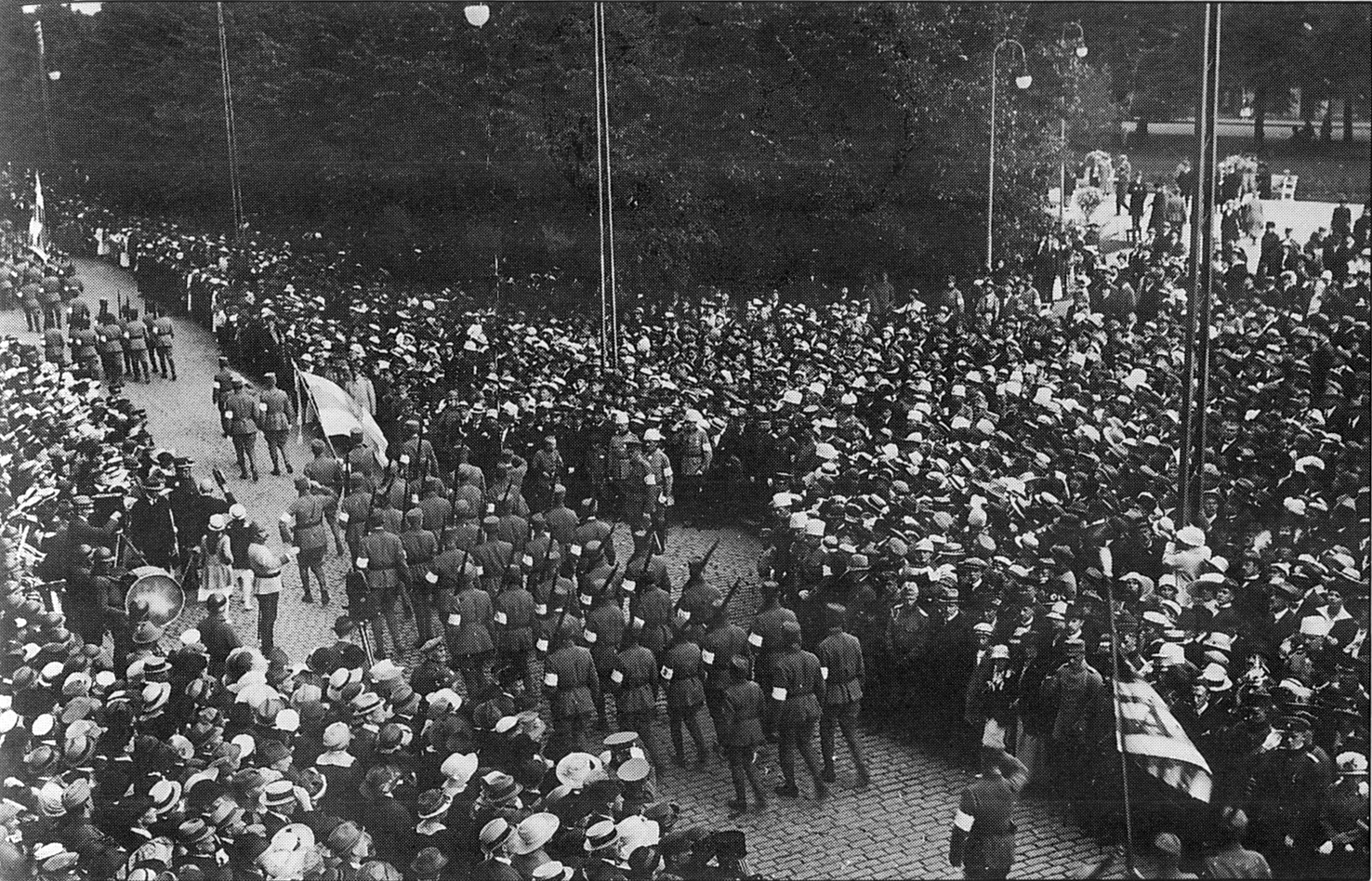
The parade of the White Guard of Finland in Helsinki on 16 August 1919

Indirect presidential elections were held for the first time in Finland in 1919. Although the country had declared Prince Frederick Charles of Hesse king on 9 October 1918, he renounced the throne on 14 December. The president was elected by Parliament, with Kaarlo Juho Ståhlberg of the National Progressive Party receiving 73% of the vote.

Ståhlberg, a moderate, liberal and reformist politician, who favoured improving the material well-being of workers and other economically poor Finns, received the votes of Social Democrats, Agrarians and Progressives. He also firmly supported the new Finnish Republic, and a parliamentary form of government with a strong president as a mediator and a political reserve for politically troubled times. Mannerheim, an independent right-winger and monarchist, suspected the democratic, republican and parliamentary form of government of producing too partisan political leaders, and of working ineffectively during crises. Ståhlberg favoured the signing of a peace treaty between Finland and the Soviet Russia, while Mannerheim in the summer of 1919 strongly considered ordering the Finnish army to invade St. Petersburg to help the Russian Whites in that country's civil war. Only the National Coalitioners and Swedish People's Party voted for Mannerheim in this presidential election.

== Results ==
Candidate	Party	Votes	%
Kaarlo Juho Ståhlberg	National Progressive Party	143	73.33
Carl Gustaf Emil Mannerheim	Independent	50	25.64
Lauri Kristian Relander	Agrarian League	1	0.51
Väinö Tanner	Social Democratic Party	1	0.51
Total		195	100.00
Valid votes		195	98.98
Invalid/blank votes		2	1.02
Total votes		197	100.00
Registered voters/turnout		200	98.50
Source: Nohlen

== See also ==
- List of candidates in Finnish presidential elections
