= Johan Helo =

Finnish lawyer, diplomat and politician

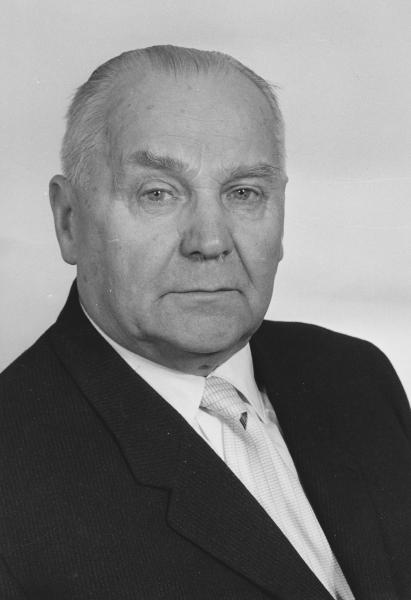
Johan Helo in 1960.

Johan Helo (22 August 1889 – 25 October 1966; surname until 1906 Helenius) was a Finnish lawyer, diplomat and politician. He was born and died in Helsinki.

Helo served as Minister of Social Affairs from 13 December 1926 to 15 November 1927, Minister of Transport and Public Works from 15 November to 17 December 1927, Minister of Finance from 17 November 1944 to 17 April 1945 and Minister of Education from 17 April to 28 December 1945.

He was a member of the Parliament of Finland, representing the Social Democratic Party of Finland from 1919 to 1922 and from 1924 to 1935 and the Finnish People's Democratic League (SKDL) from 1945 to 1946. He was in prison for political reasons from 1941 to 1944. After he was freed, he joined the SKDL and the Socialist Unity Party (SYP), a member organisation of the SKDL. He was Ambassador of Finland to France from 1946 to 1956.

Helo ran as a candidate in the 1940 presidential election, but lost to Risto Ryti.
