= Eino Kilpi (politician) =

Finnish politician and journalist

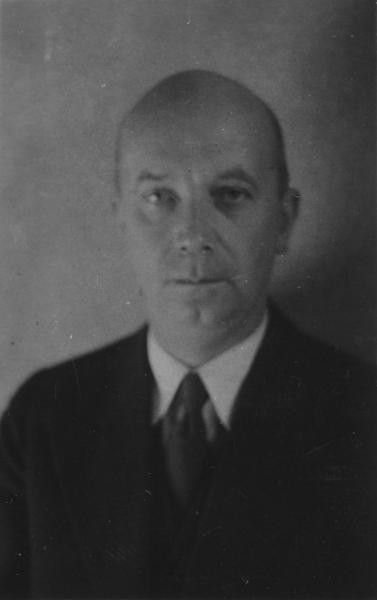
Eino Kilpi.

Johan Eino Kilpi (7 June 1889, Uusikaupunki – 7 June 1963; original surname Blomros) was a Finnish journalist and politician. He was the minister of social affairs from 17 April 1945 to 26 March 1946, minister of education from 26 March 1946 to 26 May 1946 and minister of the interior from 26 May to 29 July 1948. He was a member of the Parliament of Finland, representing the Social Democratic Party of Finland (SDP) from 1930 to 1933 and the Finnish People's Democratic League (SKDL) from 1948 to 1962. He was the candidate of the SKDL in the presidential elections of 1956, receiving 18.7% of the vote. He was married to Sylvi-Kyllikki Kilpi.

Kilpi was also editor-in-chief of Suomen Sosialidemokkratti, a Finnish magazine associated with the Social Democratic Party.
