= 1950 Finnish presidential election =

← 1946	16–17 January 1950	1956 →
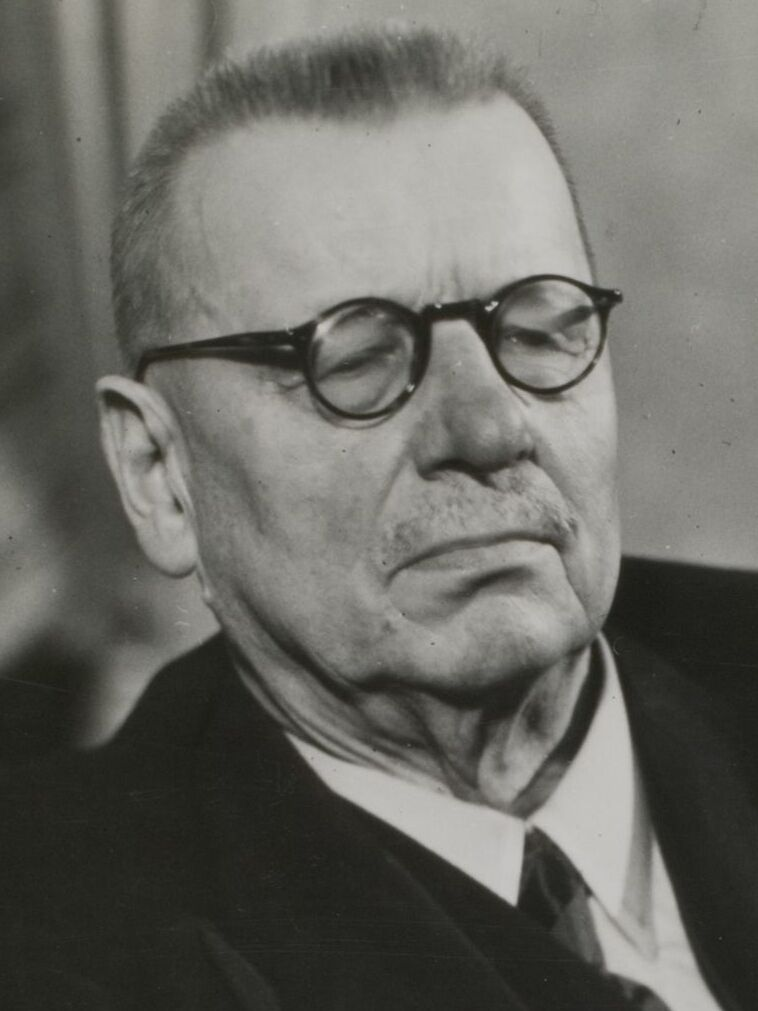

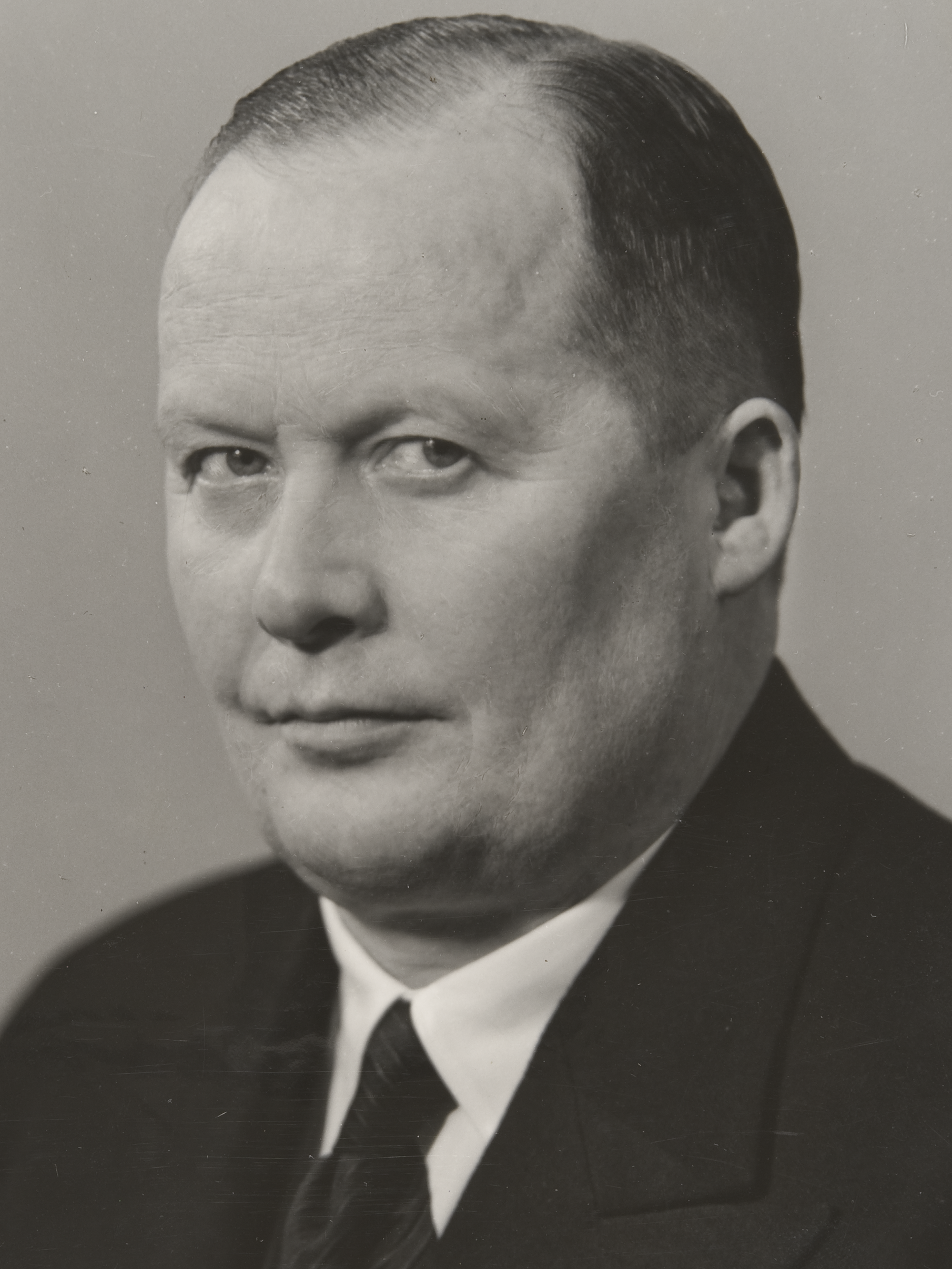

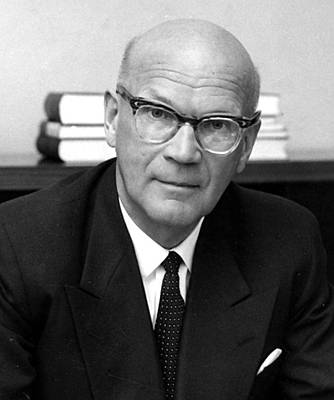
Candidate	Juho Kusti Paasikivi	Mauno Pekkala	Urho Kekkonen
Party	National Coalition	SKDL	Agrarian
Electoral vote	171	67	62
Popular vote	928,891	338,035	309,060
President before election
Juho Kusti Paasikivi
National Coalition
Elected President
Juho Kusti Paasikivi
National Coalition

Two-stage presidential elections were held in Finland in 1950, the first time the public had been involved in a presidential election since 1937 as three non-popular elections had taken place in 1940, 1943 and 1946. On 16 and 17 January the public elected presidential electors to an electoral college. They in turn elected the President. The result was a victory for Juho Kusti Paasikivi, who won on the first ballot. The turnout for the popular vote was 63.8%. President Paasikivi was at first reluctant to seek re-election, at least in regular presidential elections. He considered asking the Finnish Parliament to re-elect him through another emergency law. Former President Ståhlberg, who acted as his informal advisor, persuaded him to seek re-election through normal means when he bluntly told Paasikivi: "If the Finnish people would not bother to elect a President every six years, they truly would not deserve an independent and democratic republic." Paasikivi conducted a passive, "front-porch" style campaign, making few speeches. By contrast, the Agrarian presidential candidate, Urho Kekkonen, spoke in about 130 election meetings. The Communists claimed that Paasikivi had made mistakes in his foreign policy and had not truly pursued a peaceful and friendly foreign policy towards the Soviet Union. The Agrarians criticized Paasikivi more subtly and indirectly, referring to his advanced age (79 years), and speaking anecdotally about aged masters of farmhouses, who had not realized in time that they should have surrendered their houses' leadership to their sons. Kekkonen claimed that the incumbent Social Democratic minority government of Prime Minister K.A. Fagerholm had neglected the Finnish farmers and the unemployed. Kekkonen also championed a non-partisan democracy that would be neither a social democracy nor a people's democracy. The Communists hoped that their presidential candidate, former Prime Minister Mauno Pekkala, would draw votes away from the Social Democrats (who quietly supported Paasikivi), because Pekkala was a former Social Democrat. The Agrarians lost over four per cent of their share of the vote compared to the 1948 parliamentary elections. This loss ensured Paasikivi's re-election. Otherwise Kekkonen could have been narrowly elected President - provided that all the Communist and People's Democratic presidential electors would also have voted for him.

== Results ==
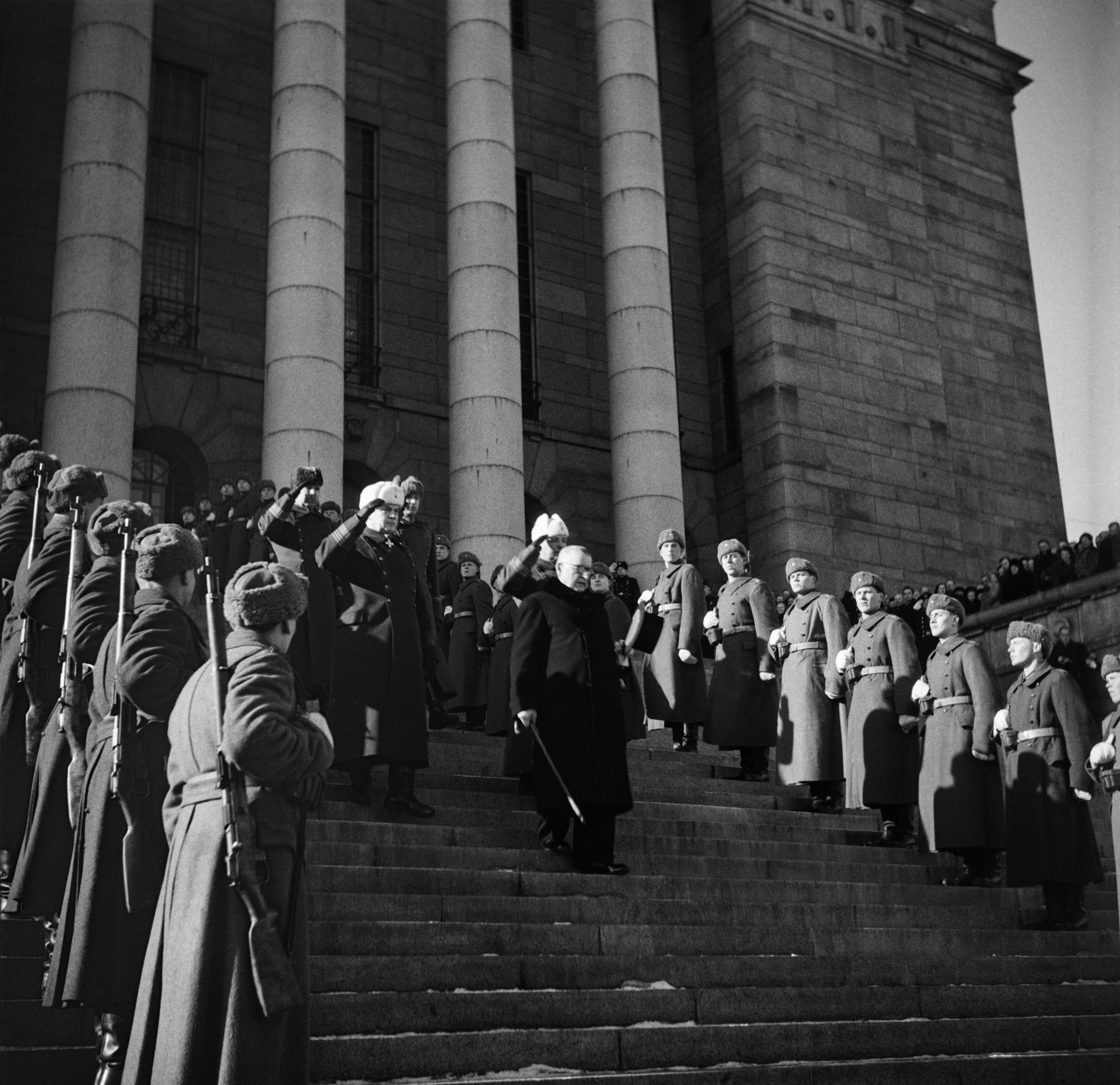
The inauguration of the Finnish president J. K. Paasikivi in his second presidency at the Parliament House in Helsinki on March 1, 1950.

=== Popular vote ===
Party	Votes	%	Seats
National Coalition Party	360,789	22.88	68
Social Democratic Party	343,828	21.80	64
Candidature of Mauno Pekkala	338,035	21.43	67
Candidature of Urho Kekkonen	309,060	19.60	62
Swedish People’s Party	139,318	8.83	24
National Progressive Party	84,956	5.39	15
Others	1,057	0.07	0
Total	1,577,043	100.00	300
Valid votes	1,577,043	99.45	
Invalid/blank votes	8,792	0.55	
Total votes	1,585,835	100.00	
Registered voters/turnout	2,487,230	63.76	
Source: Nohlen & Stöver

=== Electoral college ===
Candidate	Party	Votes	%
Juho Kusti Paasikivi	National Coalition Party	171	57.00
Mauno Pekkala	Finnish People's Democratic League	67	22.33
Urho Kekkonen	Agrarian League	62	20.67
Total		300	100.00
Source: Nohlen & Stöver
