= 1946 Finnish presidential election =

- 9 March 1946
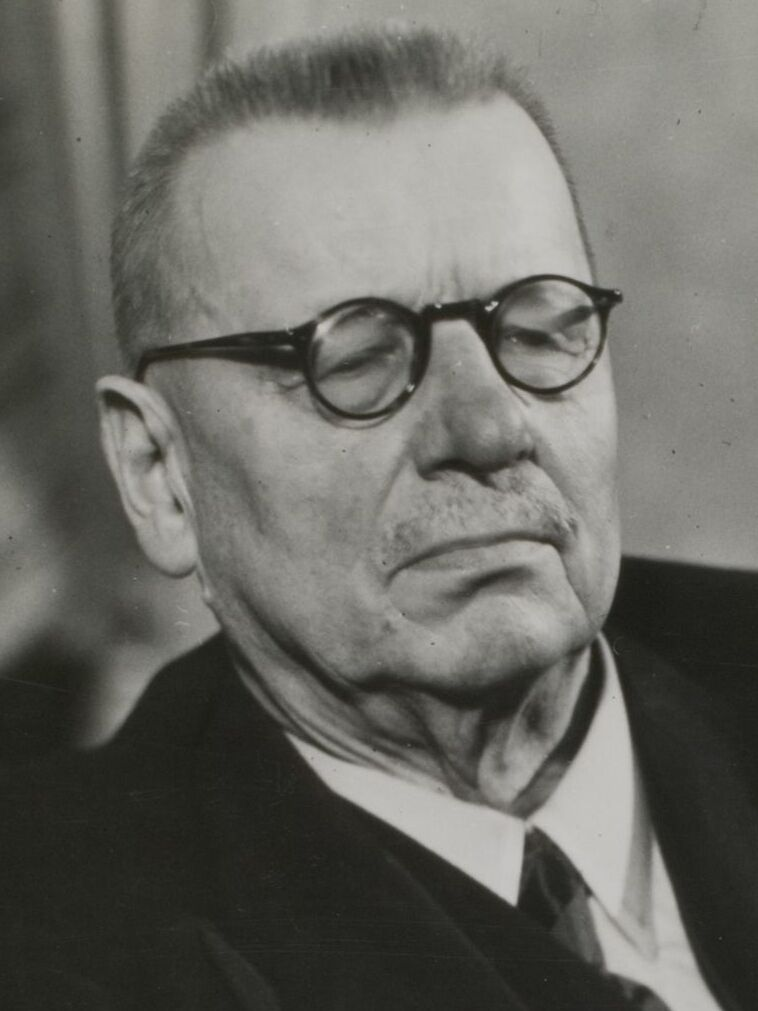

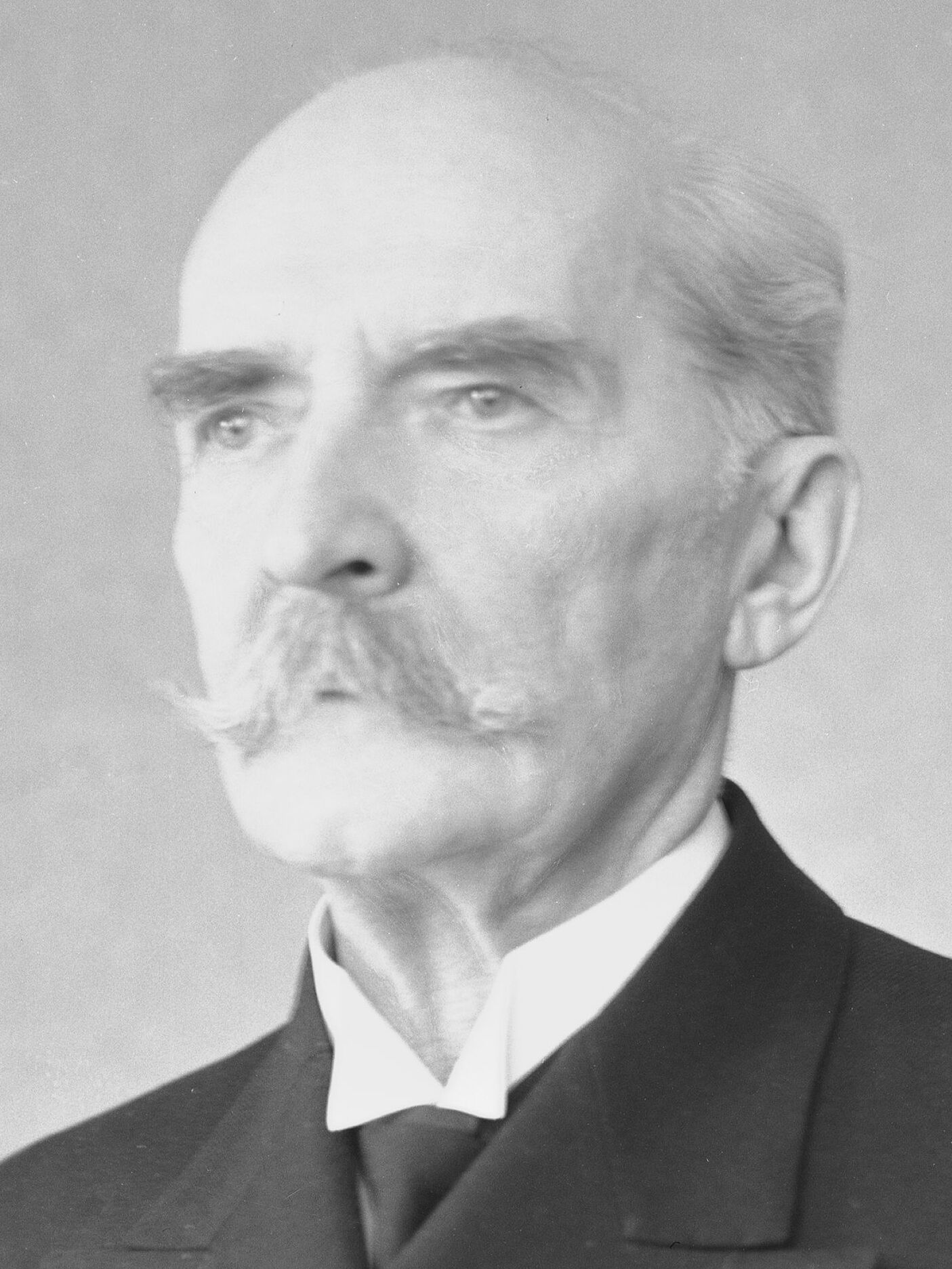
Candidate	Juho Kusti Paasikivi	Kaarlo Juho Ståhlberg
Party	National Coalition	National Progressive
Electoral vote	159	14
President before election
Carl Gustaf Emil Mannerheim
Independent
Elected President
Juho Kusti Paasikivi
National Coalition

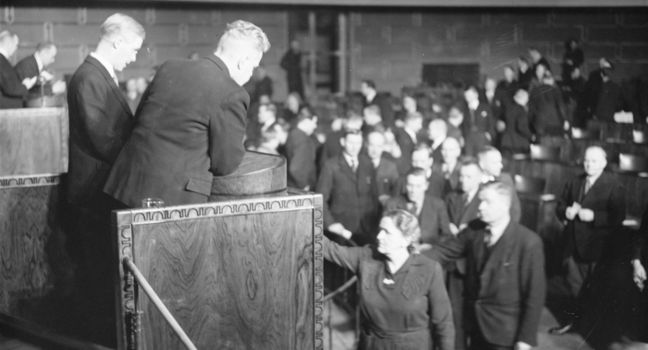
Parliament elects prime minister Juho Kusti Paasikivi to succeed the resigning Mannerheim as new president on 9 March 1946

Indirect presidential elections were held in Finland in 1946. In 1944 the Parliament had passed a law that enabled Carl Gustaf Emil Mannerheim to serve a six-year term. However, he resigned on 4 March 1946, giving as his reason his declining health and his view that the tasks he had been selected to carry out had been accomplished. An election was held in Parliament to appoint his successor. Juho Kusti Paasikivi was elected with 159 of the 200 votes. Mannerheim had suffered from poor health since 1945, and he had vacationed abroad (chiefly in Portugal) from November 1945 to January 1946. He had been concerned about the possibility of being indicted for abusing his office as the Commander-in-Chief of the Finnish army when approving of Finland's participation in the Continuation War (1941–1944) against the Soviet Union, and in an informal military alliance with Germany. He was not indicted, but eight leading wartime Finnish politicians were, and Mannerheim stayed abroad, mainly in Portugal, and on sick leave in the Red Cross's hospital in Helsinki from November 1945 to March 1946, to remain on the political background during the "war guilt" trial. Paasikivi was regarded by many Finnish politicians as the only realistic successor of Mannerheim, given his long diplomatic and foreign policy experience. Because many Karelian refugees would not yet have been able to vote in regular Finnish presidential elections until the autumn of 1946, due to their frequent changes of home town, the Finnish Parliament decided to pass an exceptional law to elect the new President. Former President K.J. Ståhlberg was not an official presidential candidate, but he received 14 sympathy votes in these presidential elections, because a few Finnish parliamentarians respected his preference for regular presidential elections.

== Results ==
Candidate	Party	Votes	%
Juho Kusti Paasikivi	National Coalition Party	159	91.91
Kaarlo Juho Ståhlberg	National Progressive Party	14	8.09
Total		173	100.00
Valid votes		173	94.02
Invalid/blank votes		11	5.98
Total votes		184	100.00
Registered voters/turnout		200	92.00
Source: Nohlen & Stöver
