= 1956 Finnish presidential election =

- 16–17 January 1956 / 15 February 1956
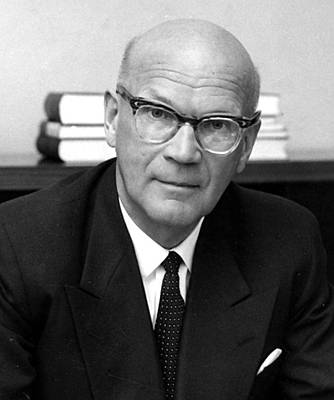

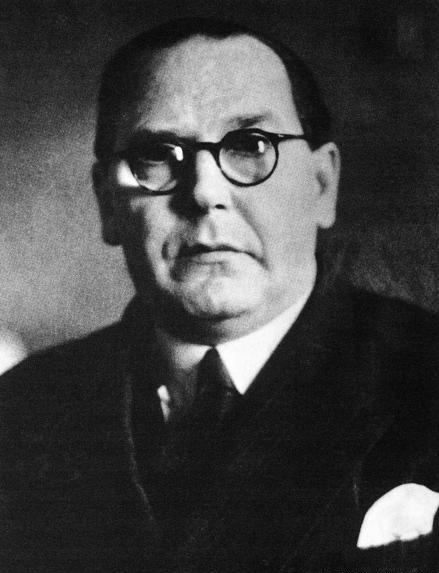
Candidate	Urho Kekkonen	Karl-August Fagerholm
Party	Agrarian	SDP
Electoral vote	151	149
Popular vote	510,783	442,408
Percentage	26.93%	23.33%
President before election
Juho Kusti Paasikivi
National Coalition
Elected President
Urho Kekkonen
Agrarian

Two-stage presidential elections were held in Finland in 1956. On 16 and 17 January the public elected presidential electors to an electoral college. They in turn elected the President (on the 15 February).

The result was a victory for Urho Kekkonen, who won on the third ballot over Karl-August Fagerholm. The turnout for the popular vote was 73.4%. Kekkonen had been Juho Kusti Paasikivi's heir apparent since the early 1950s, given his notable political skills for building coalitions, bargaining, risk-taking and adjusting his tactics, actions and rhetoric with regard for the prevailing political wind.

On the other hand, his behaviour and political tactics, including sharp-tongued speeches and writings, utilization of political opponents' weaknesses, and rather close relations with the Soviet leaders, were severely criticized by several of his political opponents.

Kekkonen's colourful private life, including occasional heavy drinking and at least one extramarital affair, also provided his fierce opponents with verbal and political weapons to attack him. Several other presidential candidates were also criticized for personal issues or failures.

Despite all the anti-Kekkonen criticism, his political party, the Agrarians, succeeded for the first time in getting the same share of the vote in the presidential elections' direct stage as in the parliamentary elections.

President Paasikivi had neither publicly agreed nor refused to be a presidential candidate. He considered himself morally obliged to serve as president for a couple of more years, if many politicians urged him to do so. Between the first and second ballots of the Electoral College, one National Coalitioner phoned him, asking him to become a dark-horse presidential candidate of the National Coalitioners, Swedish People's Party and People's Party (liberals).

At first, Paasikivi declined, requiring the support of Social Democrats and most Agrarians. Then he moderated his position, but mistakenly believed that he would receive enough Social Democratic, Agrarian and Communist and People's Democratic electors' votes to advance to the crucial third ballot. This did not happen, because all Agrarian electors remained loyal to Kekkonen, all Social Democratic electors remained loyal to Fagerholm, and the Communist and People's Democratic electors split their votes to help Fagerholm and Kekkonen advance to the third ballot. The bitterly annoyed and disappointed President Paasikivi publicly denied his last-minute presidential candidacy two days later. Kekkonen was elected president with the narrowest possible majority, 151 votes to 149. For several decades, the question of who cast the decisive vote for him has been debated among Finnish politicians and some Finnish journalists (see, for example, Lauri Haataja, "A Reconstructing Finland" (Jälleenrakentava Suomi), pgs. 825–827, 829–831 in Seppo Zetterberg et al., eds., A Small Giant of the Finnish History / Suomen historian pikkujättiläinen. Helsinki: WSOY, 2003; Pentti Virrankoski, A History of Finland / Suomen historia, volumes 1&2. Helsinki: Finnish Literature Society (Suomalaisen Kirjallisuuden Seura), 2009, pg. 954; Tuomo Polvinen, J.K. Paasikivi - A Statesman's Life Work (Valtiomiehen elämäntyö), volume 5: 1948–1956. Helsinki: WSOY, 2003).

== Results ==
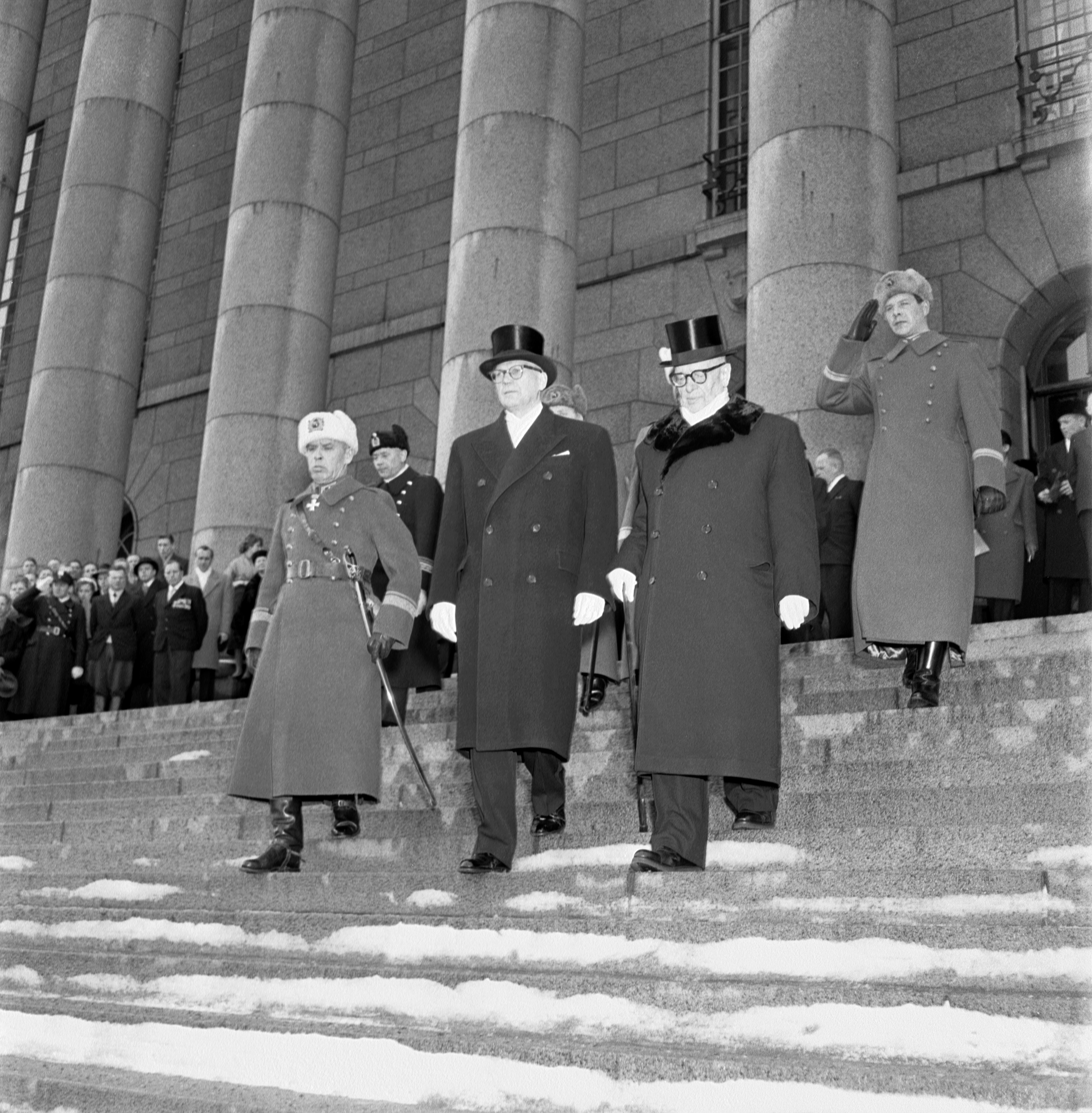
The inauguration of the Finnish president Urho Kekkonen and outgoing President J. K. Paasikivi at the Parliament House in Helsinki on March 1, 1956

=== Popular vote ===
Party	Votes	%	Seats
Candidature of Urho Kekkonen	510,783	26.93	88
Candidature of Karl August Fagerholm	442,408	23.33	72
Candidature of Eino Kilpi	354,575	18.69	56
National Coalition Party	340,311	17.94	54
Swedish People's Party	130,145	6.86	20
Candidature of Eero Rydman	85,690	4.52	7
Liberal League	32,662	1.72	3
Others	81	0.00	0
Total	1,896,655	100.00	300
Valid votes	1,896,655	99.54	
Invalid/blank votes	8,794	0.46	
Total votes	1,905,449	100.00	
Registered voters/turnout	2,597,738	73.35	
Source: Nohln & Stöver

=== Electoral college ===
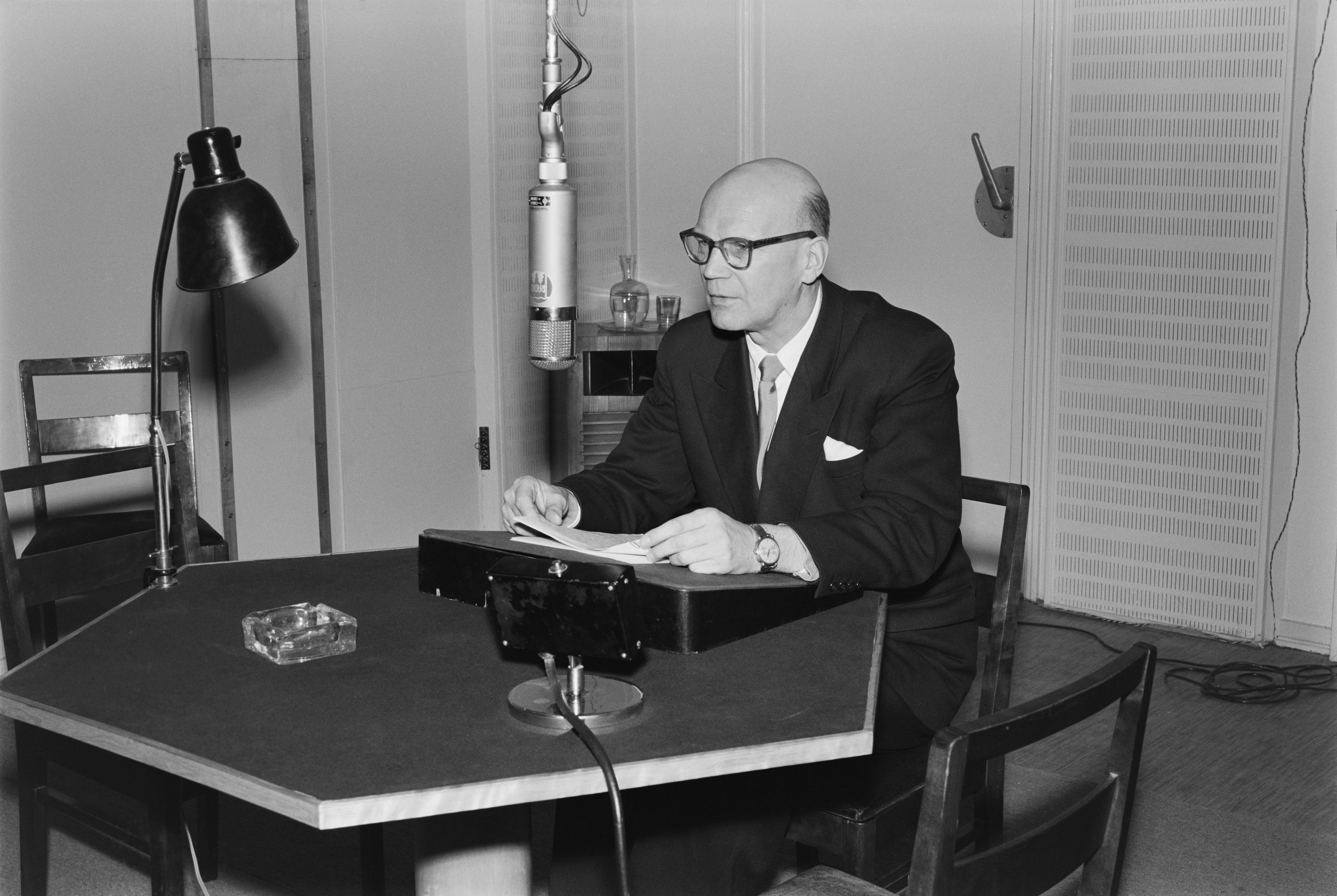
Urho Kekkonen holding a radio speech during the election

Candidate	Party	First round		Second round		Third round	
Candidate	Party	Votes	%	Votes	%	Votes	%
Urho Kekkonen	Agrarian League	88	29.33	102	34.00	151	50.33
Karl August Fagerholm	Social Democratic Party	72	24.00	114	38.00	149	49.67
Sakari Tuomioja	Liberal League	57	19.00				
Eino Kilpi	Finnish People's Democratic League	56	18.67				
Ralf Törngren	Swedish People's Party	20	6.67				
Eero Rydman	People's Party	7	2.33				
Juho Kusti Paasikivi	National Coalition Party			84	28.00		
Total		300	100.00	300	100.00	300	100.00
Source: Nohlen & Stöver
