= 1931 Finnish presidential election =

← 1925	15–16 January 1931	1937 →
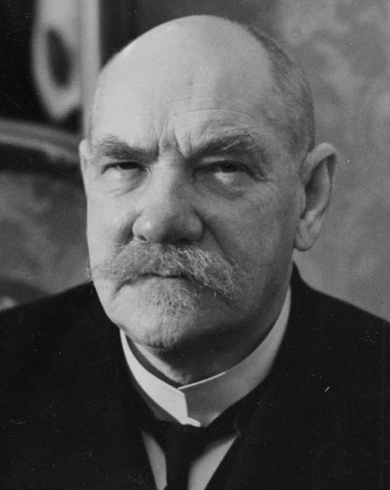

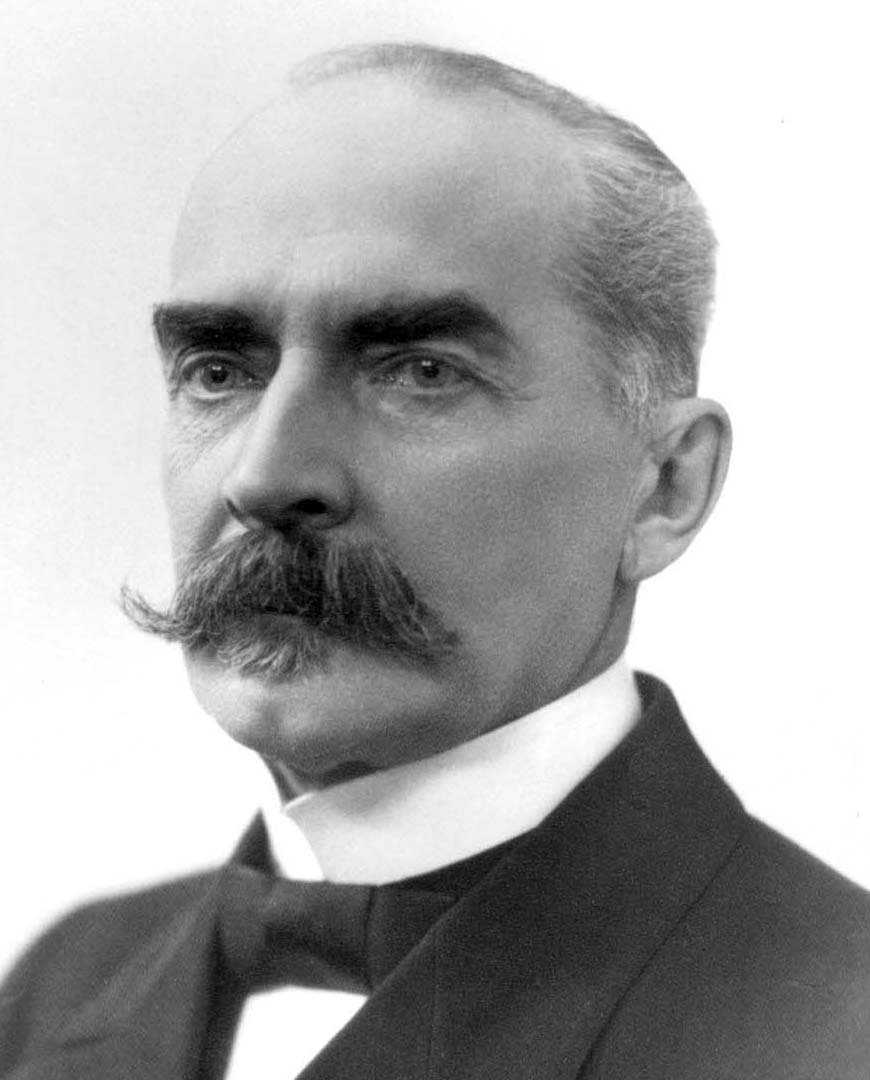
Candidate	Pehr Evind Svinhufvud	Kaarlo Juho Ståhlberg
Party	National Coalition	National Progressive
Electoral vote	151	149
Popular vote	180,378	148,430
President before election
Lauri Kristian Relander
Agrarian
Elected President
Pehr Evind Svinhufvud
National Coalition

Two-stage presidential elections were held in Finland in 1931. On 15 and 16 January the public elected presidential electors to an electoral college. They in turn elected the President. The result was a victory for Pehr Evind Svinhufvud, who won on the third ballot by just two votes. The turnout for the popular vote was 47.3%.

== Background ==
This presidential election was held during an ideologically, politically, socially and economically tense time. The Great Depression was impoverishing many Finnish farmers and workers. The far-right Lapua Movement had not settled for the ban of the Communist Party and its affiliated organizations in the autumn of 1930. It wanted to help elect a President who would strongly oppose the Social Democrats and moderate bourgeois parties, such as the Progressives. Although Svinhufvud disapproved of the Lapua Movement's violent kidnappings of left-wing politicians and other illegal acts, he was their preferred presidential candidate. Former President K.J. Ståhlberg, a champion of democracy, parliamentarism and the rule of law, had been briefly kidnapped by some activists of the Lapua Movement with his wife in October 1930. He was chosen as the Progressive presidential candidate. Speaker of the Finnish Parliament, Kyösti Kallio, held ideals similar to those of Ståhlberg, and he became the Agrarian presidential candidate. The outgoing President, Lauri Kristian Relander, had lost the Agrarian presidential candidacy to Kallio, because he did not condemn the Lapua Movement as strongly as Kallio did, and a sufficient number of Agrarians believed that Kallio could control the Lapua Movement's extremists more effectively than Relander. Right-wing Finns and some centrists, such as a prominent Agrarian parliamentarian, Juho Niukkanen, were concerned that Ståhlberg's re-election (after a six-year break) as the Finnish President would escalate political tensions in Finland. The Commander-in-Chief of the Civil Guards (a bourgeois voluntary defence organization), Major General Lauri Malmberg, announced in the Finnish Parliament that he would not guarantee order among the Civil Guards, if Ståhlberg was elected president. Svinhufvud's razor-thin victory required Niukkanen's arm-twisting tactics, whereby he pressured all the Agrarian presidential electors to support Svinhufvud. This 69-year-old and slightly ailing conservative politician was considered by his supporters as a sufficiently bold, solid and patriotic man to re-unite the ideologically divided Finns. His pro-democracy supporters hoped that he could keep both right-wing extremists and left-wing extremists in check.

== Results ==
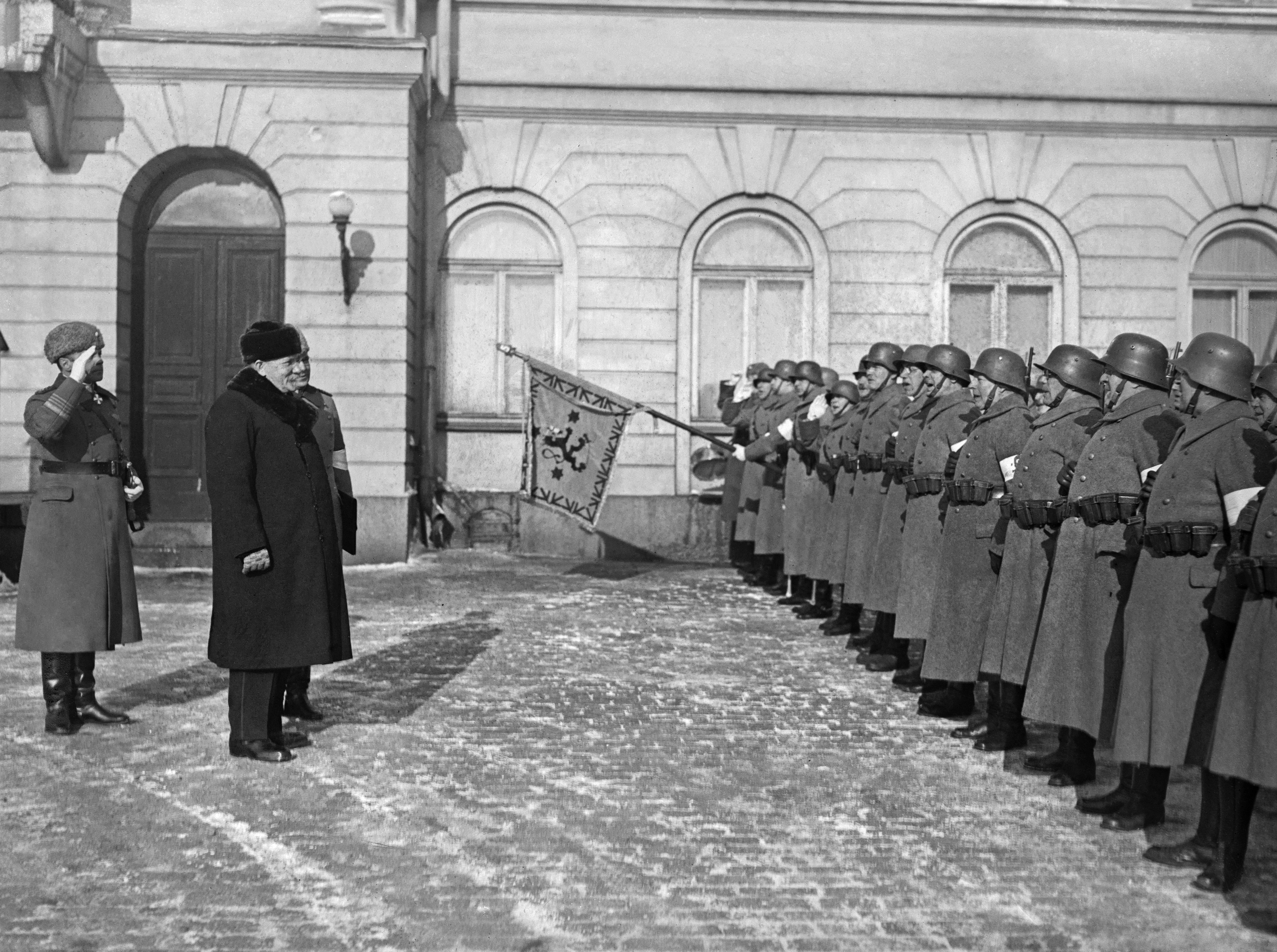
President Svinhufvud enters his office in Helsinki 2.3.1931. President Svinhufvud standing outside the Presidential Palace

=== Popular vote ===
Party	Votes	%	Seats
Social Democratic Party	252,550	30.18	90
National Coalition Party	180,378	21.56	64
Agrarian League	167,574	20.03	69
National Progressive Party	148,430	17.74	50
Swedish People's Party	75,382	9.01	25
Small Farmers' Party	11,772	1.41	2
Others	672	0.08	0
Total	836,758	100.00	300
Valid votes	836,758	99.67	
Invalid/blank votes	2,763	0.33	
Total votes	839,521	100.00	
Registered voters/turnout	1,775,982	47.27	
Source: Nohlen & Stöver

=== Electoral college ===
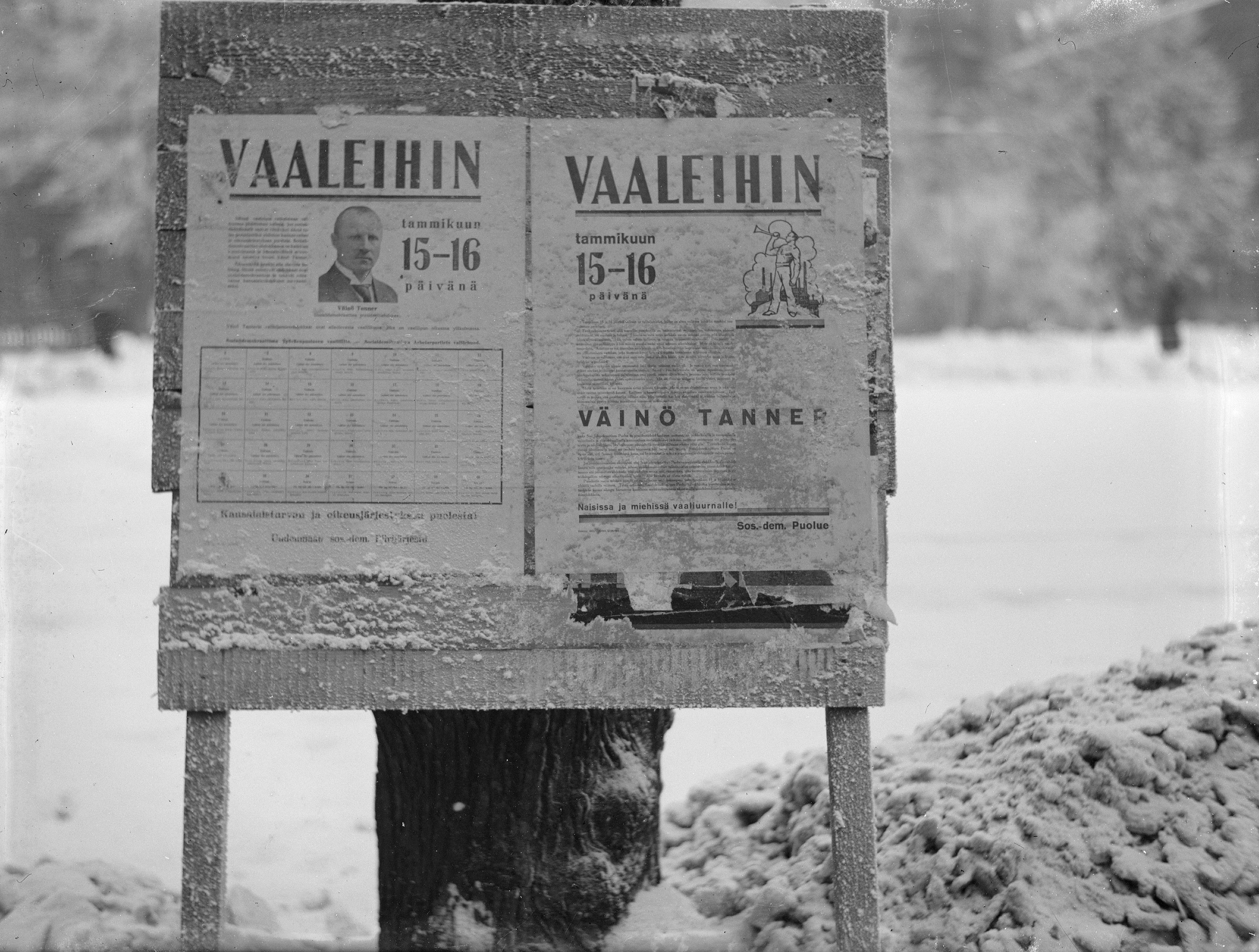
Presidential election advertisements for the Finnish Social Democratic Party

Candidate	Party	First round		Second round		Third round	
Candidate	Party	Votes	%	Votes	%	Votes	%
Väinö Tanner	Social Democratic Party	90	30.00	0	0.00		
Pehr Evind Svinhufvud	National Coalition Party	88	29.33	98	32.67	151	50.33
Kyösti Kallio	Agrarian League	64	21.33	53	17.67		
Kaarlo Juho Ståhlberg	National Progressive Party	58	19.33	149	49.67	149	49.67
Total		300	100.00	300	100.00	300	100.00
Source: Nohlen & Stöver
