= 1943 Finnish presidential election =

← 1940	15 February 1943	1946 →
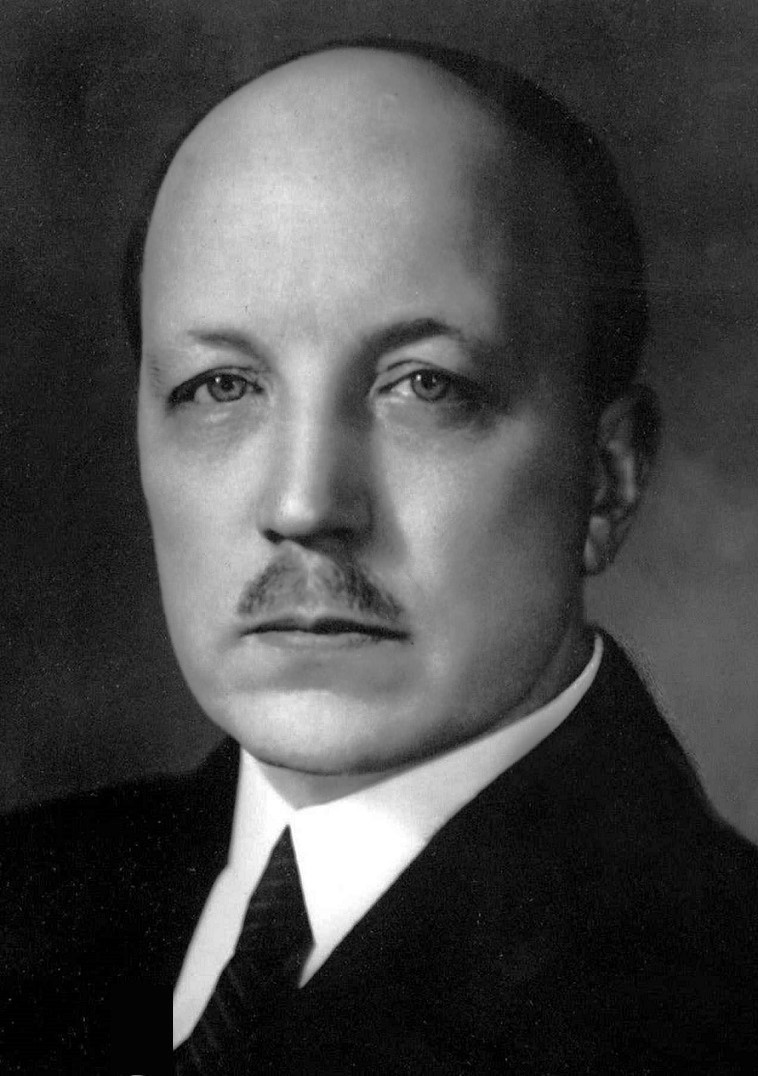

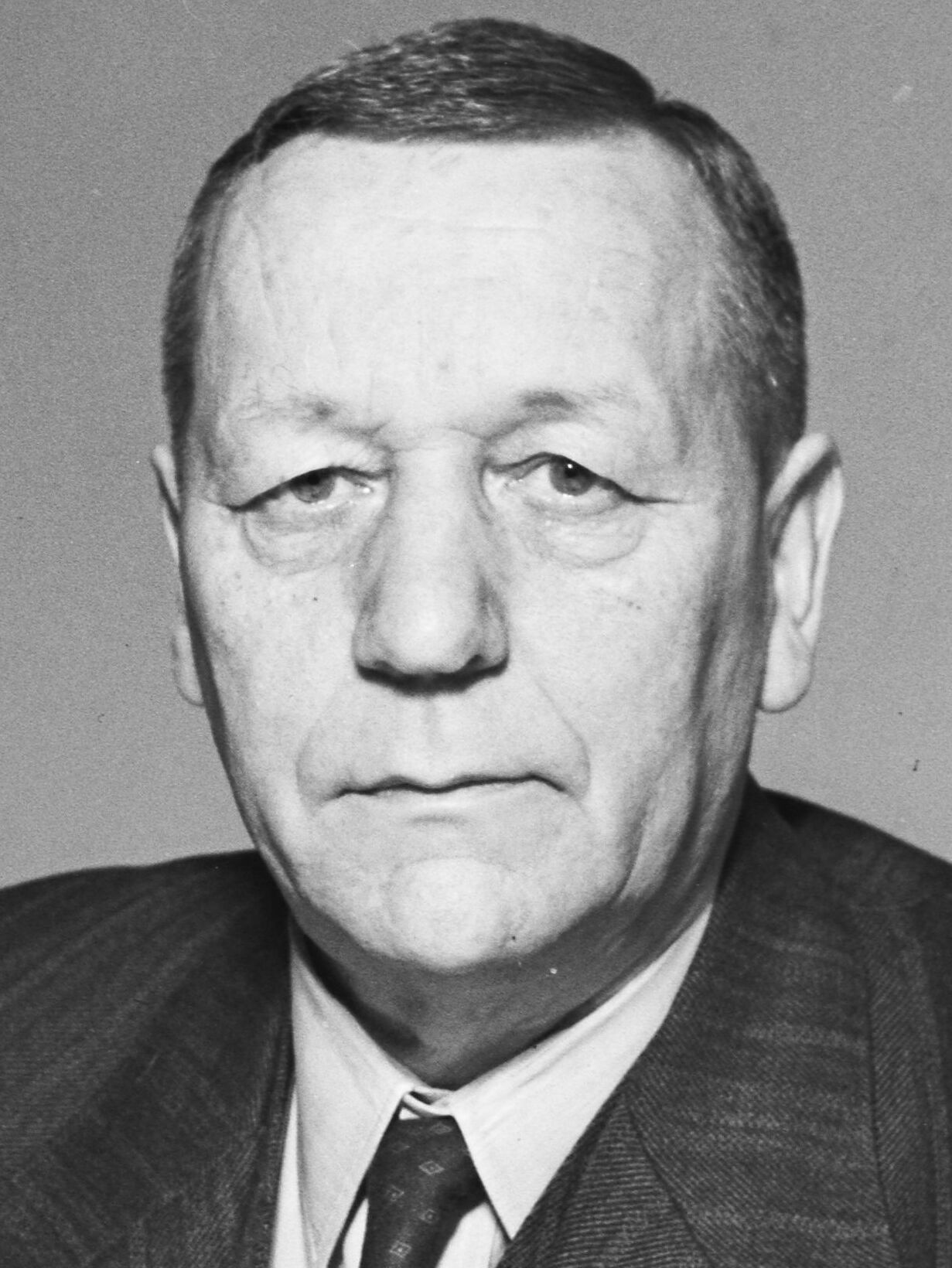
Candidate	Risto Ryti	Väinö Kotilainen
Party	National Progressive	Independent
Electoral vote	269	4
President before election
Risto Ryti
National Progressive
Elected President
Risto Ryti
National Progressive

Indirect presidential elections were held in Finland in 1943. The 1937 electoral college was recalled and re-elected Risto Ryti, who received 269 of the 300 votes. President Ryti was ready to remain in office and to try to lead Finland successfully through World War II. Nevertheless, some Finnish politicians believed that Marshal Mannerheim, the Commander-in-Chief of the Finnish army, would lead Finland more effectively. In a test vote, 147 presidential electors out of 300 supported Mannerheim. This plurality was not, however, enough for Mannerheim who required an assured majority of electors to back him for his presidential candidacy. Having failed to receive this majority's support, Mannerheim withdrew his candidacy and Ryti was overwhelmingly re-elected president.

== Results ==
Candidate	Party	Votes	%
Risto Ryti	National Progressive Party	269	97.46
Väinö Kotilainen	Independent	4	1.45
Kaarlo Juho Ståhlberg	National Progressive Party	1	0.36
Carl Gustaf Emil Mannerheim	Independent	1	0.36
Arvo Manner	Agrarian League	1	0.36
Total		276	100.00
Valid votes		276	92.00
Invalid/blank votes		24	8.00
Total votes		300	100.00
Source: Nohlen & Stöver
