= 1940 Finnish presidential election =

← 1937	19 December 1940	1943 →
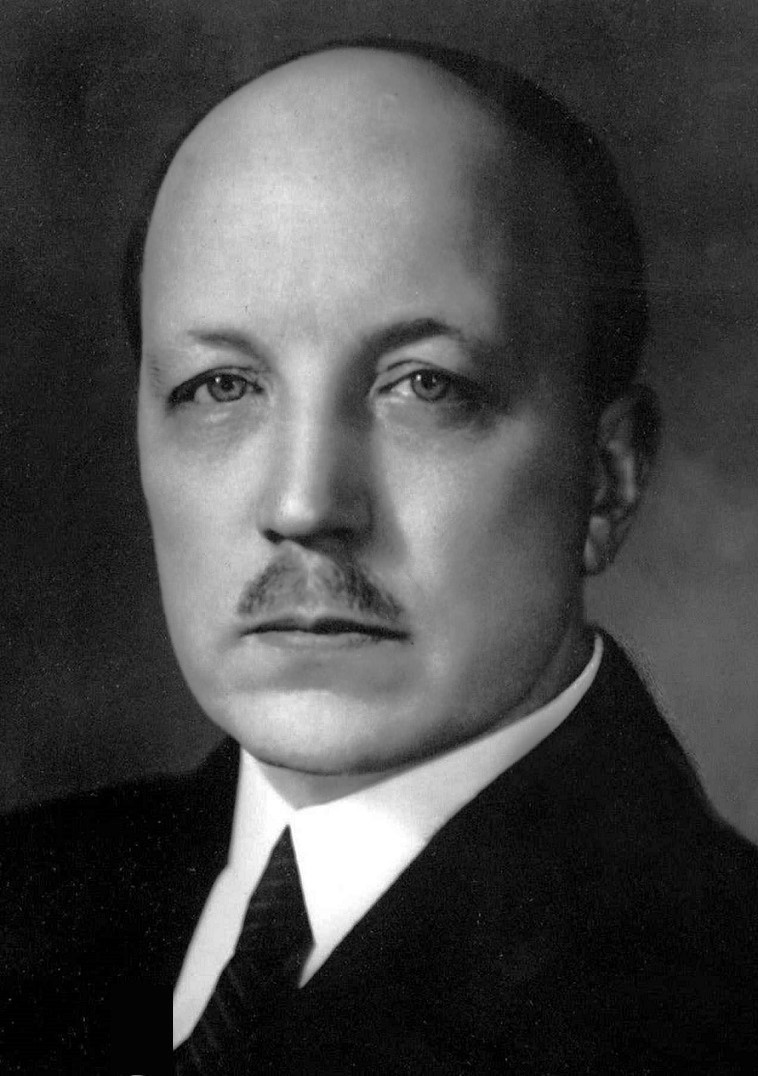

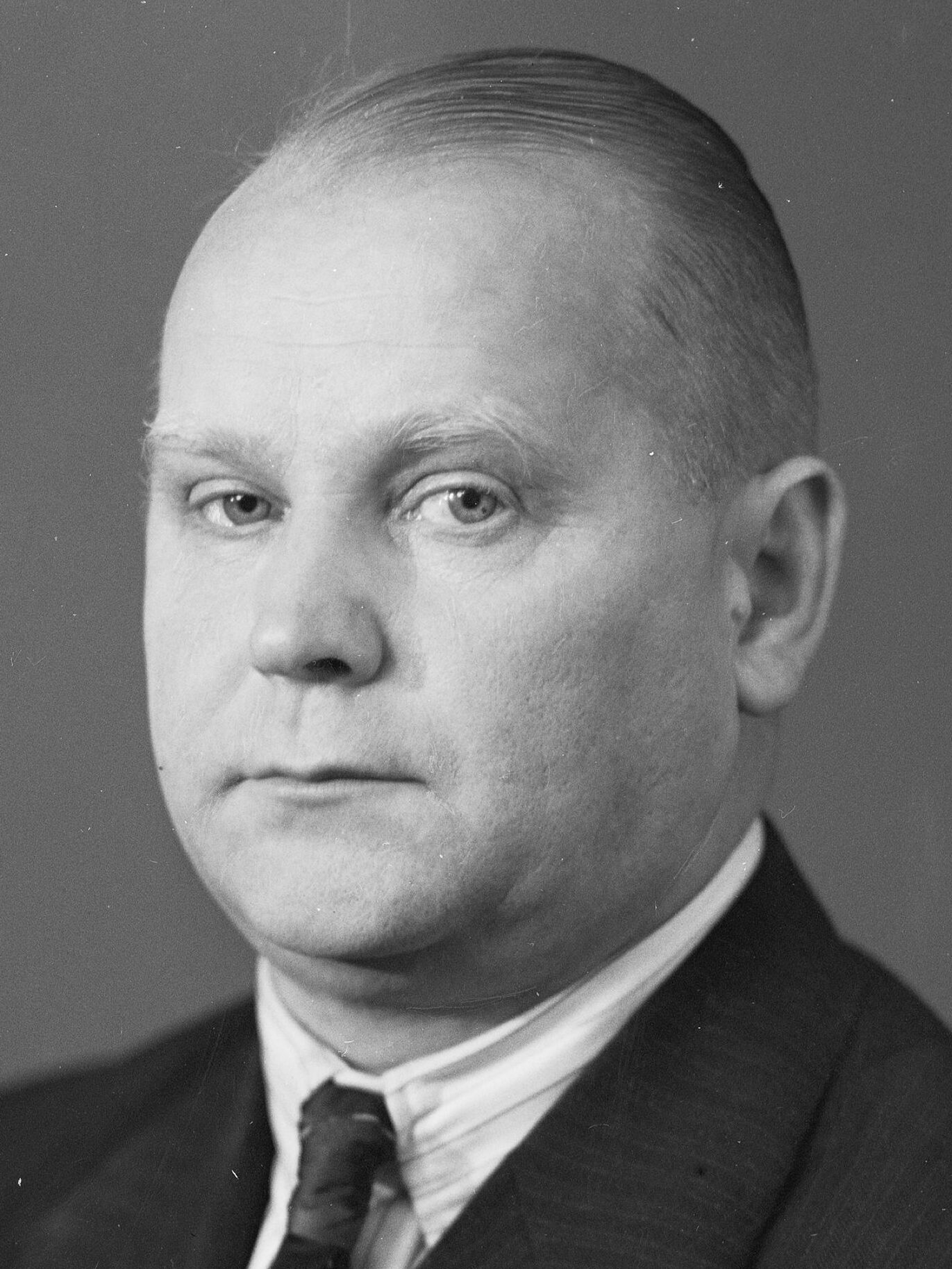
Candidate	Risto Ryti	Johan Helo
Party	National Progressive	SDP
Electoral vote	288	4
President before election
Kyösti Kallio
Agrarian
Elected President
Risto Ryti
National Progressive

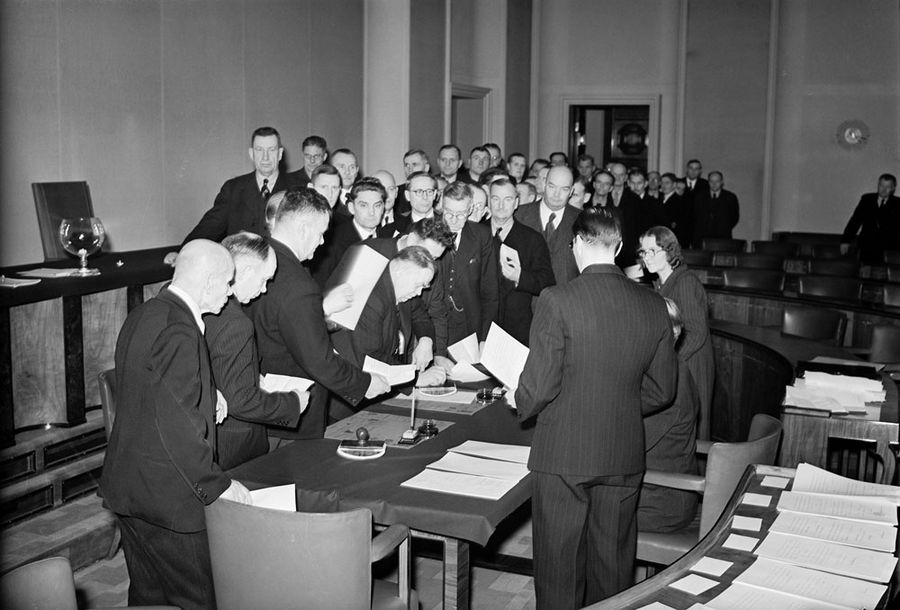
The presidential elections taking place

Early and indirect presidential elections were held in Finland in 1940 after President Kyösti Kallio resigned on 27 November following a stroke on 27 August. The 1937 electoral college was recalled and elected Prime Minister Risto Ryti, who received 288 of the 300 votes. Most other Finnish politicians considered Ryti a principled, unselfish, intelligent and patriotic man, who could lead Finland effectively enough during World War II. His leadership qualities had been tested already during the Winter War (November 1939–March 1940). Also the outgoing President Kallio considered him the best available presidential candidate. In early December 1940, the Soviet Foreign Minister, Vyacheslav Molotov, interfered with the Finnish presidential elections by claiming to the Finnish Ambassador to the Soviet Union, Juho Kusti Paasikivi, that if potential presidential candidates such as Marshal Carl Gustaf Emil Mannerheim, former President Pehr Evind Svinhufvud, or former Prime Minister Toivo Mikael Kivimäki were elected President, the Soviet government would consider Finland unwilling to fulfill its peace treaty with the Soviet Union. Due to the lingering threat of another war and the Karelian refugees' dispersal throughout Finland, regular presidential elections were cancelled, and instead the 1937 presidential electors were summoned to elect the President. Under these tense political circumstances, Ryti had no problem winning these exceptional presidential elections by a landslide. The same day, former president Kallio died.

== Results ==
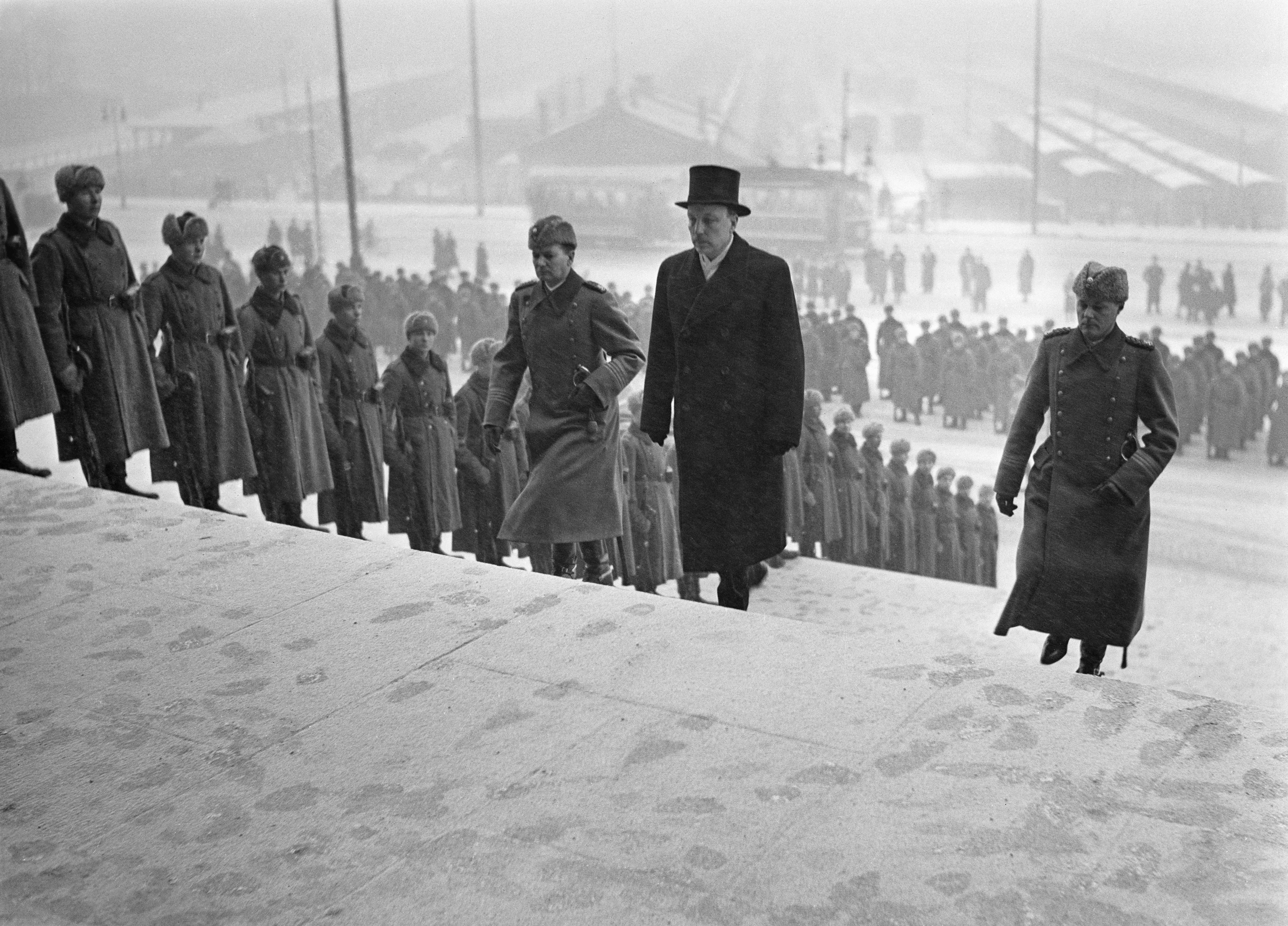
Risto Ryti enters office as President of Finland in Helsinki 21.12.1940

Candidate	Party	Votes	%
Risto Ryti	National Progressive Party	288	97.96
Johan Helo	Social Democratic Party	4	1.36
Pehr Evind Svinhufvud	National Coalition Party	1	0.34
Toivo Mikael Kivimäki	National Progressive Party	1	0.34
Total		294	100.00
Valid votes		294	98.00
Invalid/blank votes		6	2.00
Total votes		300	100.00
Source: Nohlen & Stöver
