= 1937 Finnish presidential election =

← 1931	15–16 January 1937	1940 →
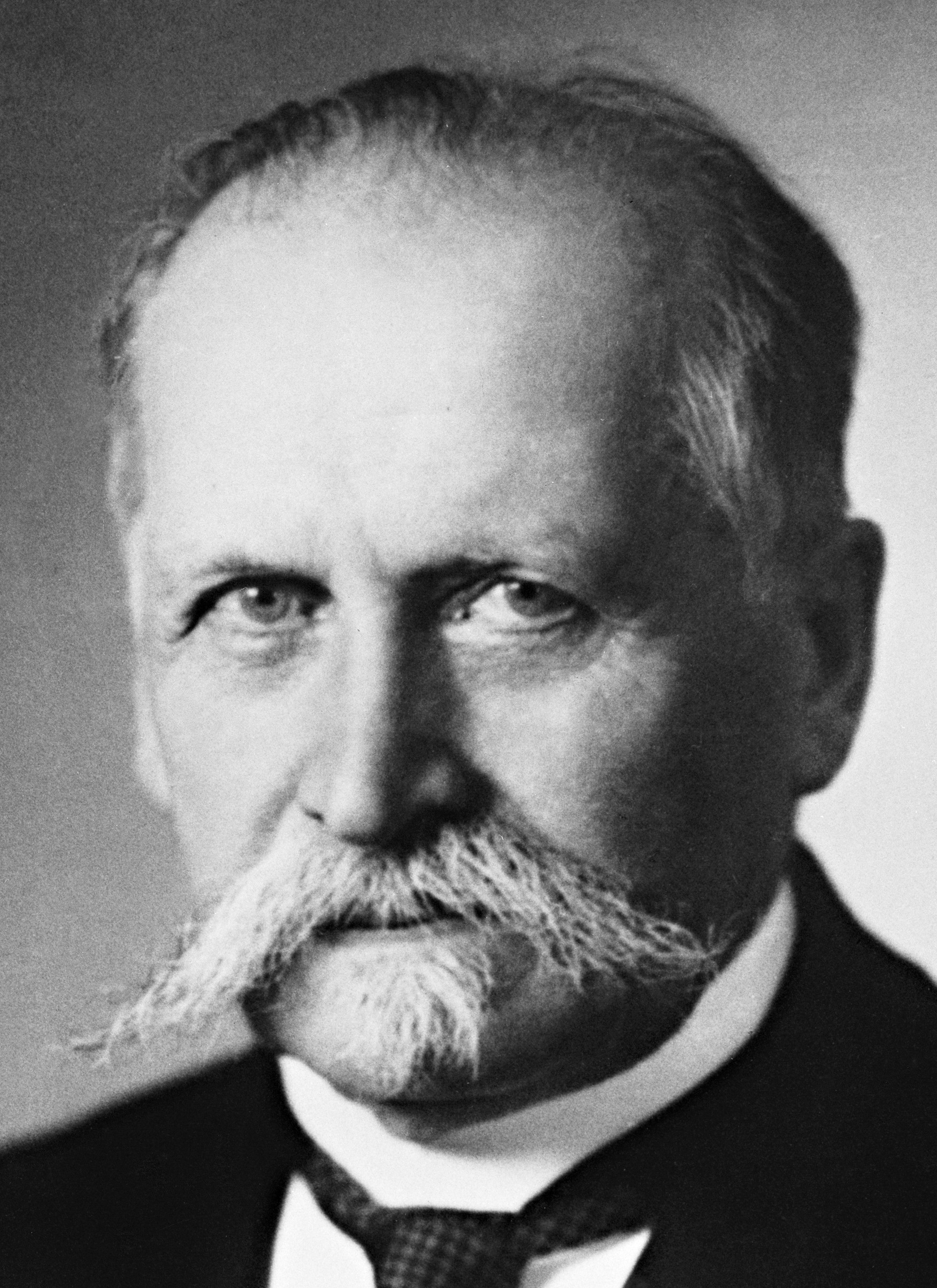

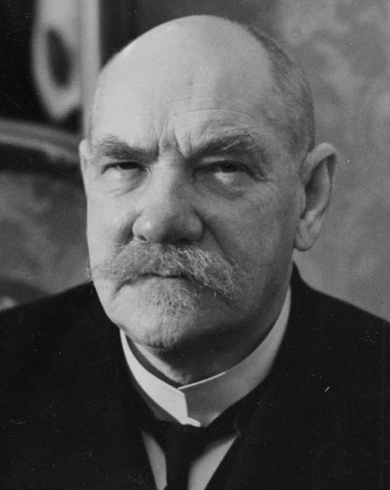

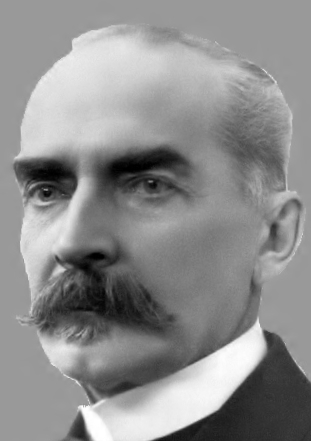
Candidate	Kyösti Kallio	Pehr Evind Svinhufvud	Kaarlo Juho Ståhlberg
Party	Agrarian	National Coalition	National Progressive
Electoral vote	177	104	19
Popular vote	184,668	240,602	141,897
President before election
Pehr Evind Svinhufvud
National Coalition
Elected President
Kyösti Kallio
Agrarian

Two-stage presidential elections were held in Finland in 1937. The first stage was on 15 and 16 January 1937 as the public selected 300 presidential electors to an electoral college.

The 300 electors, in turn, met on 15 February 1937 to elect the President. On the first ballot, Kaarlo Juho Ståhlberg received 150 electoral votes, one vote short of the 151 necessary for a majority. Pehr Evind Svinhufvud, the incumbent President of Finland, received 94 votes and Kyösti Kallio was third with only 56 votes. On the second ballot, 131 of Stahlberg's electors deserted him, and Kallio received 177 votes, with 104 for Svinhufvud and only 19 for Stahlberg . The turnout for the popular vote was 57.8%.

== Background ==
The issues the election campaign was fought on included President Pehr Evind Svinhufvud's refusal in September and October 1936 to allow the Social Democrats - then clearly the largest political party in Finland - to enter the government, Prime Minister Kallio's moderate and conciliatory attitude towards the Social Democrats, former President Ståhlberg's second attempt to regain power, and the distribution of the new Finnish economic prosperity among the various social classes, especially labourers and peasants.

Almost one-third of the electors originally supported the Social Democratic candidate, Väinö Tanner, whose supporters conceded that he had no chance of being elected in the bourgeois Finland, but emphasized that his electors could probably decide who would win the presidency. President Svinhufvud also had almost one-third of the electors behind him (including the right-wing electors of the Swedish People's Party), while both Kallio and Ståhlberg each had just under one-fifth of the electors supporting them. However, Kallio had the fewest uncompromising opponents in the Electoral College. This made him easily the second-best choice (after Ståhlberg) for the Social Democrats and the moderate supporters of Ståhlberg. Thus Kallio won the presidency clearly on the second ballot. Kallio's victory was helped also by the fact that the ideological quarrels in Finland had calmed down considerably since the early and mid-1930s, given Finland's rising prosperity, the gradually increasing Agrarian-Social Democratic co-operation, and the far right's decreasing support.

== Results ==
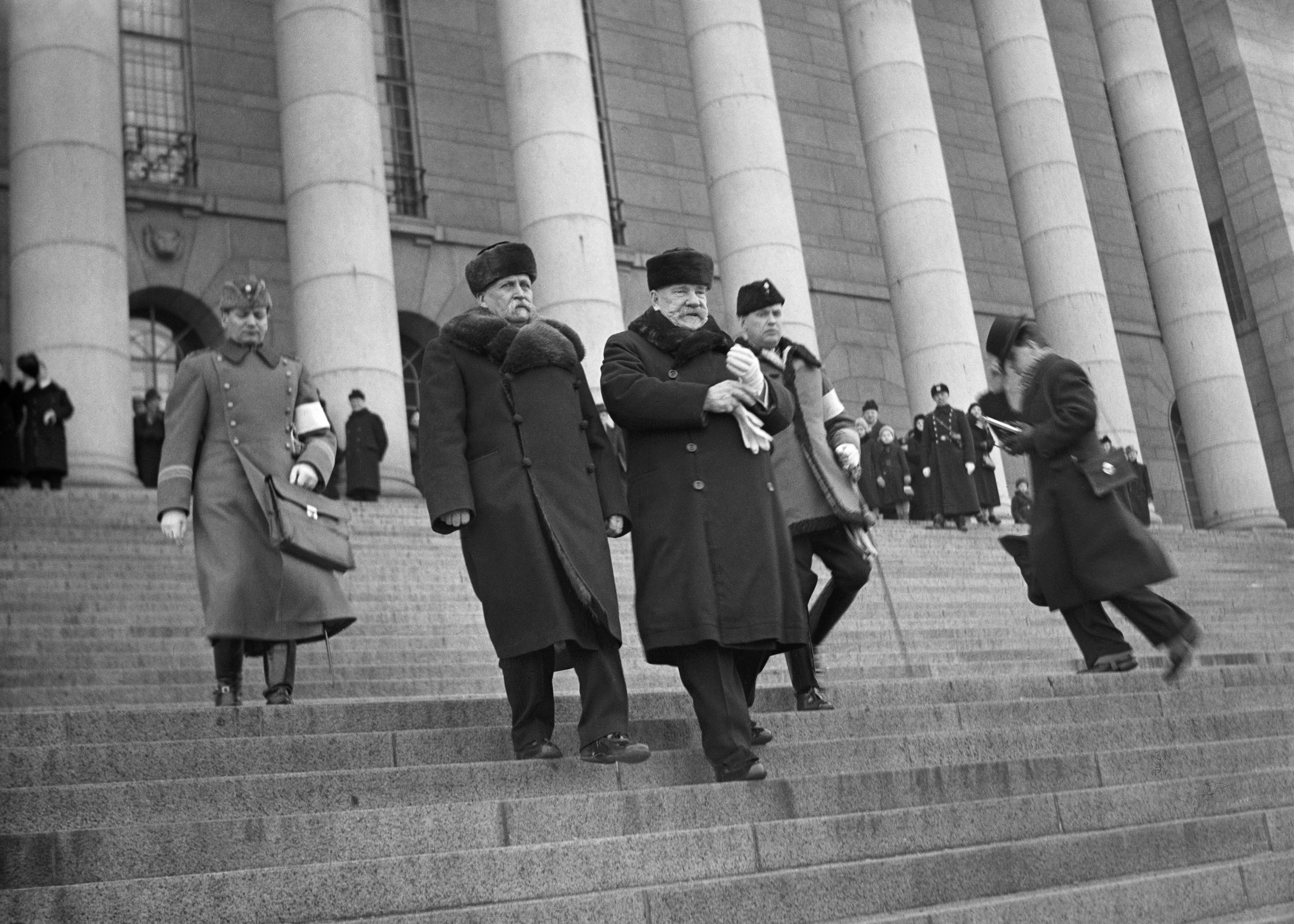
President Kyösti Kallio assumes his post. The new and the old president leave the Parliament house in Helsinki 1.3.1937

=== Popular vote ===
Party	Votes	%	Seats
Social Democratic Party	341,408	30.68	95
General electoral alliance for Svinhufvud	240,602	21.62	63
Supporters of Kallio	184,668	16.60	56
General electoral alliance for Ståhlberg	141,897	12.75	36
Swedish People's Party	102,250	9.19	25
Patriotic People's Movement	90,378	8.12	23
Swedish Left	10,743	0.97	2
Others	700	0.06	0
Total	1,112,646	100.00	300
Valid votes	1,112,646	99.73	
Invalid/blank votes	3,058	0.27	
Total votes	1,115,704	100.00	
Registered voters/turnout	1,929,868	57.81	
Source: Nohln & Stöver

=== Electoral college ===
Candidate	Party	First round		Second round	
Candidate	Party	Votes	%	Votes	%
Kaarlo Juho Ståhlberg	National Progressive Party	150	50.00	19	6.33
Pehr Evind Svinhufvud	National Coalition Party	94	31.33	104	34.67
Kyösti Kallio	Agrarian League	56	18.67	177	59.00
Total		300	100.00	300	100.00
Source: Nohlen & Stöver
