= List of Aalto University people =

The Aalto University is a Finnish university established on January 1, 2010, by the merger of the Helsinki University of Technology, the Helsinki School of Economics, and the University of Art and Design Helsinki. This article intends to present the notable alumni and people linked to the Aalto University and its three founding schools.

In the list are included graduates and full professors. Visiting professors have not been added and non-graduated students only in rare cases where so is stated. It is notable that before 2005 there in general were no bachelor's degrees awarded at the universities.

== Helsinki University of Technology ==
- Aino Aalto
- Elissa Aalto
- Alvar Aalto (1898–1976), architect (M.Sc. 1921)
- Eric Adlercreutz, architect (M.Sc.)
- Matti Alahuhta, CEO of Kone (D.Sc.)
- Kaj Arnö (M.Sc.), of MySQL
- Kim Borg, operatic bass and vocal pedagogue (M.Sc.)
- Erik Bryggman, architect (M.Sc.)
- Marco Casagrande, architect (M.Sc.)
- Torolf Eklund, aeronautical engineer
- Aarne Ervi, architect (M.Sc.)
- Kristian Gullichsen, architect (M.Sc.)
- Raimo P. Hämäläinen, professor of applied mathematics and operations research
- Riitta Hari, professor of biomedical engineering, member of both the Academy of Finland and the United States National Academy of Sciences
- Satu Hassi, MEP, former MP and minister (Lic.Sc.)
- Vilhelm Helander, architect (M.Sc.)
- Signe Hornborg, first female architect in Europe
- Kari Jormakka, architect (M.Sc.)
- Jyrki Kasvi, MP (D.Sc.)
- Teuvo Kohonen, professor emeritus of computer science, neural networks pioneer
- Gustaf Komppa, professor of chemistry
- Ora Lassila computer scientist, researcher
- Juha Leiviskä, architect (M.Sc.)
- Markku Leskelä, professor of inorganic chemistry at University of Helsinki; ISI Highly Cited Researcher (D.Sc.)
- Henrik Lilius, professor in architecture
- Yrjö Lindegren, architect (M.Sc.)
- Olli Lounasmaa, professor of physics
- Marjo Matikainen-Kallström, MP and olympic gold medalist (M.Sc.)
- Hjalmar Mellin, professor of mathematics, rector (1904–1907)
- Mårten Mickos, of MySQL
- Carl O. Nordling, architect (M.Sc.)
- Gunnar Nordström, professor of physics
- Kaisa Nyberg, professor of computer science, cryptologist
- Erkki Oja, professor of computer science
- Jorma Ollila, Chairman of Royal Dutch Shell and Nokia; restructurer of Nokia as CEO (M.Sc.)
- Simo Paavilainen, architect and professor
- Juhani Pallasmaa, architect (M.Sc. and professor)
- Kai Puolamäki, researcher
- Uolevi Raade, industrialist (M.Sc.)
- Antti Räisänen, professor in electrical engineering
- Viljo Revell, architect (M.Sc.)
- Jorma Rissanen, information theorist (D.Sc.)
- Aarno Ruusuvuori, architect (M.Sc.)
- Martin Saarikangas, industrialist (M.Sc.)
- Eliel Saarinen (1873–1950), architect; father of Eero Saarinen
- Esa Saarinen, professor of applied philosophy
- Niklas Savander, corporate leader (M.Sc.)
- Risto Siilasmaa, founder and Chairman of F-Secure (M.Sc.)
- Arto Sipinen, architect (M.Sc.)
- J. S. Sirén, architect (M.Sc.)
- Kaija Siren, architect (M.Sc.)
- Frans Anatolius Sjöström, architect (M.Sc.)
- Gunnar Taucher, architect (M.Sc.)
- Antti Tuuri, writer (M.Sc.)
- Martti Välikangas, architect (M.Sc.)
- Artturi Virtanen, professor of biochemistry, Nobel laureate (Chemistry, 1945)
- Wilhelm Wahlforss, industrialist (M.Sc.)
- Björn Westerlund, industrialist (M.Sc.)
- Monty Widenius, of MySQL
- Waldemar Wilenius, architect (M.Sc.)
- Tatu Ylönen, designer of the Secure Shell (Lic.Sc.)

== Helsinki School of Economics ==
- Sari Baldauf, corporate leader
- Kare Casals, entrepreneur
- Kaj Chydenius, composer
- Lauri Kaukonen, corporate leader
- Mikko Kosonen, President of the Finnish Innovation Fund Sitra, PhD alumnus
- Kim Kuusi, composer
- Arto Lahti, professor and independent presidential candidate
- Barbro Owens-Kirkpatrick (BA)
- Jussi Pajunen, mayor of Helsinki
- Sirpa Pietikäinen (MBA)
- Kirsi Piha, former Member of Parliament (Finland); former Member of European Parliament
- Timo Santalainen, adjunct professor
- Lisa Sounio, CEO of dopplr
- Taneli Tikka, entrepreneur
- Erkki Tuomioja, Member of Parliament (Finland); former Minister of Foreign Affairs (2000–2007 and 2011–2015)
- Mārtiņš Staķis, Mayor of Riga

== The University of Art and Design Helsinki ==
- Eero Aarnio, designer
- Umayya Abu-Hanna, cultural active, columnist and writer
- Kaarina Aho, ceramicist and designer
- Pedro Aibéo, researcher in Architectural Democracy
- Kari Asikainen, designer
- Aleksi Bardy, director
- Elina Brotherus, photography artist
- Kaj Franck, designer
- Miklos Gaál, photographer and graphics artist
- Liisa Hallamaa, ceramist
- Klaus Härö, film director
- Samu Heikkilä, film editor
- Helena Hietanen, artist
- Pekka Himanen, philosopher, professor of creative economy
- Kirsti Ilvessalo, textile artist
- Harri Koskinen, designer
- Yrjö Kukkapuro, designer
- Irma Kukkasjärvi, textile artist
- Mika Launis, illustrator
- Stefan Lindfors, designer
- Marita Liulia, performance and video artist
- Kiba Lumberg, artist
- Susanna Majuri, photography artist
- Olli Mannermaa, designer
- Leo Mechelin, statesman, previous president of the school
- Eero Nelimarkka, painter
- Kerttu Nurminen, designer and glass artist
- Jyrki Parantainen, professor of photography
- Timo Saarnio, designer
- Aleksi Salmenperä, film director
- Timo Sarpaneva, designer
- Magnus Scharmanoff, photography artist
- Yrjö Sotamaa, rector
- Minna Sundberg, illustrator
- Ilmari Tapiovaara, designer
- Lauri Törhönen, film director
- Katja Tukiainen, artist and cartoonist
- Peter von Bagh, professor of film history
- Tapio Wirkkala, designer

== Aalto University foundation board ==
The university is governed by the seven-member Aalto University Foundation Board, currently consisting of:

- Dr. Patrick Aebischer (President of Ecole Polytechnique Fédérale de Lausanne (EPFL))
- Dr. Matti Alahuhta, Chair (President of Kone Corporation)
- Dr. Anne Brunila (Executive Vice President, Corporate Relations and Sustainability, Fortum Oyj)
- Dr. Bengt R. Holmström (Professor, MIT)
- Dr. Marja Makarow (Professor, Univ. Helsinki, ERC)
- Dr. Saku Mantere (Professor, Hanken School of Economics)
- Dr. Anna Valtonen (Rector, Umeå Institute of Design )

Former members of the foundation board:

- Dr. Robert A. Brown (President, Boston University)
