= Asikainen =

Asikainen is a Finnish surname. Notable people with the surname include:

- Alfred Asikainen (1888–1942), Finnish wrestler
- Amin Asikainen, Finnish boxer
- Veikko Asikainen (1918–2002), Finnish boxer
- Kari Asikainen, Finnish interior designer
- Lauri Asikainen, Finnish athlete
