= Bjarne Kallis =

Finnish politician (born 1945)

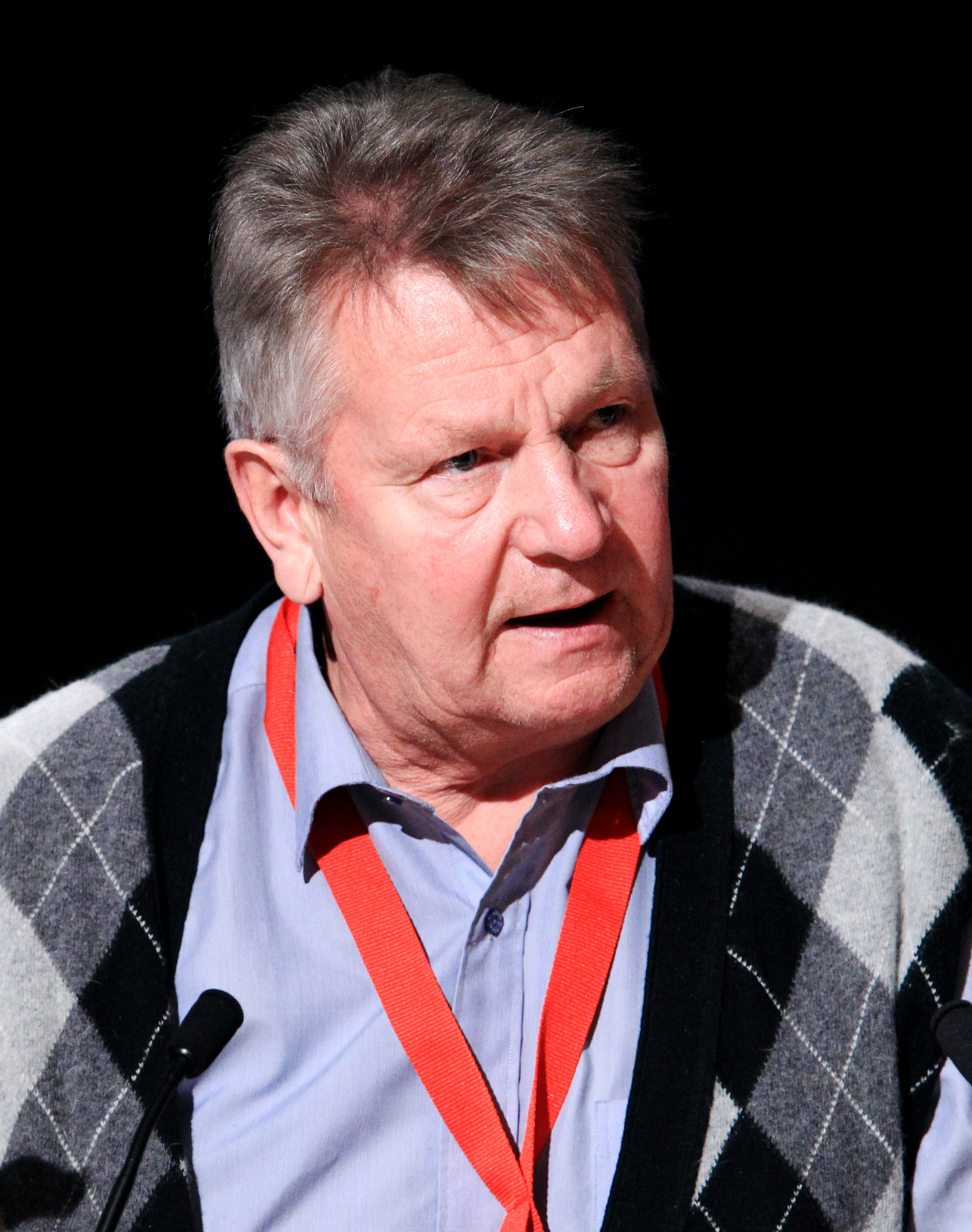
- Kallis in 2010

Leader of The Christian Democrats
- In office 1995–2004
- Preceded by: Toimi Kankaanniemi
- Succeeded by: Päivi Räsänen

Personal details
- Born: 21 March 1945 (age 81) Kokkola, Finland
- Party: Christian Democrats
- Spouse: Agneta Kallis

Johan Bjarne Kallis (born 21 March 1945) is a Finnish politician who is the former chairman of the Christian Democratic Party (KD), previously known as the Finnish Christian Coalition (SKL), and a member of the Parliament of Finland. Kallis works as the principal of the Kokkola academy of commerce and has a master's degree in political sciences.

== Chairmanship ==
Under Kallis's chairmanship, the Christian Coalition / Christian Democratic Party separated in the 2003 Parliament elections from the central parties' group and entered a statewide election alliance with the National Coalition Party, even though the Lappish circle of the Christian Coalition was already entering an election allegiance with the Centre Party in Lapland. In other circles, the Centre Party did not agree to election allegiances, so technical co-operation with the National Coalition Party was necessary.

In the 2003 elections, the party raised its support to over five percent, but the number of members of the parliament dropped to seven. The election allegiance with the National Coalition Party helped to ensure a parliament position for the Minister of Foreign Trade Jari Vilén from the Lappish election circle. In return, with the help of the election allegiance, the Christian Democratic Party was able to ensure a parliament position for Sari Essayah, who had become famous as the holder of the World Record for walking.

Under Bjarne Kallis's chairmanship, the European MP Eija-Riitta Korhola changed from the Liberal group (ELDR) to the National parties' group (EPP). Later, Korhola also changed her Finnish party membership from the Christian Democratic Party to the National Coalition Party, which caused the Christian Democratic Party to lose their only member position in the European Parliament.

Under Kallis's chairmanship, the Christian Coalition, which had emphasised religiousness, changed into a general Christian democratic party, the Christian Democratic Party of Finland. After Kallis, Päivi Räsänen was elected as the new chairman of the party.

== Presidential election 2006 ==
Bjarne Kallis was the candidate of the Christian Democratic Party in the 2006 Presidential elections. The people's association that gathered to support Kallis's candidacy was started on 1 October 2005 by European Parliament Member and friend of Kallis, Hannu Takkula from the Finnish Centre Party. The beauty professional Tiina Jylhä also agreed to support Kallis.

Like Henrik Lax and partly like Sauli Niinistö, Kallis aimed to challenge the head of the Finnish foreign relationships, the president and the prime minister, by supporting a stronger defense dimension of the European Union and possibly even membership in NATO. Tarja Halonen, the candidate of the Social Democratic Party, the foreign minister Erkki Tuomioja and the prime minister Matti Vanhanen, the candidate of the Centre Party, support neutrality also in the future. Kallis is also the chairman of Finnish-Israel society.

Kallis finished sixth out of the eight candidates in the first round of the election on 15 January, with a vote share of 2.0% (61,483 votes). Like Matti Vanhanen, Henrix Lax and Arto Lahti, he publicly endorsed Sauli Niinistö of the National Coalition Party in the runoff election, held on 29 January, between Niinistö and the incumbent Tarja Halonen who, however, went on to be re-elected.

Party political offices
| Preceded by Toimi Kankaanniemi | Leader of the Christian Democrats; 1995–2004 | Succeeded by Päivi Räsänen |
