= Kannisto =

Kannisto is a surname. Notable people with the surname include:

- A. A. Kannisto (1876–1930), Finnish trade unionist and politician
- Heikki Kannisto (1898–1957), Finnish jurist and politician
- Sanna Kannisto (born 1974), Finnish photographer
