= Timothy Persons =

American curator

- Born: 1954 (age 71–72); Narvik, Norway
- Education: MFA, Claremont Graduate School (1982)
- Alma mater: Claremont Graduate University; CalArts (collaborative program)
- Occupations: Curator, writer, artist, professor
- Employer(s): Aalto University School of Art, Design and Architecture
- Organizations: Persons Projects; Paris Photo Selection Committee
- Known for: Founder of The Helsinki School; Co-founder of Persons Projects (Berlin)
- Notable work: The Helsinki School (book series); Curated exhibitions across Europe and USA

Timothy Persons is a US-American curator, writer, artist, and adjunct professor based in Berlin and Helsinki.

== Early life and education ==
Persons was born in 1954 in Narvik, Norway and grew up in Claremont-Pomona (Los Angeles), USA. He studied under the ceramic artist Paul Soldner, and worked as his teaching assistant for 2 years. Persons also worked with numerous guest lectures at the time, James Turrell, Betty Woodman, and Lewis Baltz. His graduate studies in Southern California were part of the joint cooperation between John Baldessari’s Cal Arts program and the Claremont Graduates Universities concept of the Open Studio as a platform to teach from. He returned to Europe after completing his Master of Fine Arts, at Claremont Graduate School in California in 1982.

== Career ==
Persons is the creator and founder of The Helsinki School, based upon a Professional Studies program that was unique in how it used its academic platform to create an environment that blended teachers, students and former graduates together in a contextual dialogue through group exhibitions, publications and the utilization of the international art fairs as a means for teaching, referencing and presenting their works to the international community. Its name was introduced in an article by Boris Hohmeyer, Aufbruch im hohen Norden (Breakthrough in the Far North), in art Das Kunstmagazin in 2003.

He is an adjunct professor at Aalto University School of Art, Design and Architecture in Espoo, Finland. He is also the co-founder of the gallery Persons Projects (former Gallery Taik Persons) in Berlin.

Persons has acted as curatorial advisor to Kulturhuset, Stockholm, KIASMA Museum of Contemporary Art, Helsinki and The National Museum of Photography – The Royal Library, Copenhagen. Furthermore, he is a senior member of the Paris Photo selection committee since 2006. Moreover he had a position as senior advisor to the Borås art museum and was a head of the jury for the Hasselblad "Young Artist" Award, Gothenburg between 2003 and 2005.

He has lectured widely at art and educational institutions, museums and universities, including Museo Nacional Centro de Arte Reina Sofía in Madrid, Complutense University in Madrid, Danish National Museum of Photography in Copenhagen, universities: NYU, Pratt, Columbia, Yale (USA), Beaux-Art de Paris (FRA). As a lecturer he took part at cultural events such as the European Month of Photography 2020 in Berlin, participating at panel discussions about topics like the future of photography education.

Apart from his role as an academic member, he collaborated with various artists and publishing houses such as Hatje Cantz, releasing book contributions such as 6 volumes of The Helsinki School (2005-2019), Grey Crawford: El Mirage (2018), Dominik Lejman: Painting with Timecode (2014), POLISH!: Contemporary Art from Poland (2011), and Nuevas Historias: A New View of Spanish Photography and Video (2008).

== Curated exhibitions (selection) ==
He has curated many international exhibitions, including:

- The Helsinki School, Landskrona Museum (2017)
- The Decade of Revolts, Kulturhuset, Stockholm (2014)
- Grażyna Kulczyk Collection. Everybody Is Nobody for Somebody, Fundación Banco Santander, Madrid (2014)
- New Wave Finland: Contemporary Photography from Finland, Scandinavia House, New York (2013)
- Katarzyna Kozyra, Kulturhuset, Stockholm (2012)
- Nelli Palomäki: As Time Consumes Us, Kulturhuset, Stockholm (2011)
- Helsinki School - Photography and video NOW, Meilahti Art Museum, Helsinki (2010)
- Nuevas Historias: A new View of Spanish Photography and Video Art, Kulturhuset Stockholm (2008/09)
- Nan Goldin, Kulturhuset, Stockholm and KIASMA, Helsinki (2008)
- Rose Boréal, Beaux-Arts de Paris and Lille (2008)
- Photo Finnish – The Helsinki School, Stenersen Museum, Oslo (2007)
- Joakim Eskildsen: The Roma Journeys, Kulturhuset, Stockholm (2007)
- The Helsinki School – A New Approach, Künstlerhaus Bethanien, Berlin (2005).
