= Jari Silomäki =

Finnish photographer

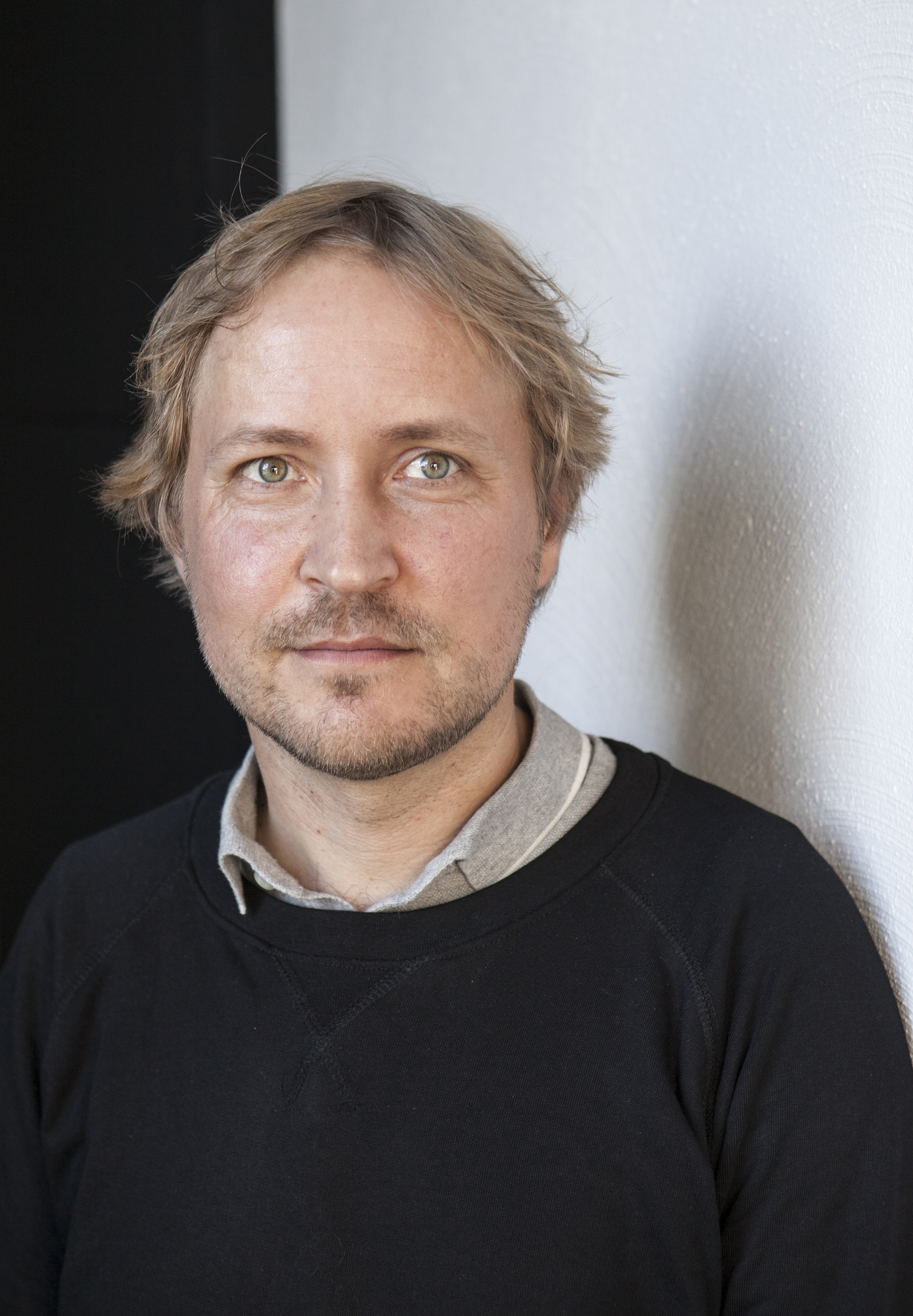
Artist Jari Silomäki at Kiasma in 2015

Jari Silomäki (born 1975 in Parkano, Finland) is a Finnish artist based in Helsinki. He is a member of The Helsinki School focusing on contemporary Finnish, conceptual, and social photography.

== Career ==
Silomäki has studied photography at Muurla College, Turku Art Academy and the University of Art and Design, graduating in 2007.

In 2020, Silomäki's works have been presented in his biggest solo exhibition so far, Atlas of Emotions, at the Finnish Museum of Photography in Helsinki. Furthermore, his artworks have been widely exhibited in Finland and internationally featured in institutions and galleries such as MoMA P.S.1 in New York, Kulturhuset in Stockholm, Zanis Lipke Memorial Museum in Riga, House of Photography and Ludwig Museum in Budapest, as well as D Museum in Seoul.

His works are part of international collections such as the Finnish State Art Commission, Museum of Contemporary Art Kiasma in Helsinki, National Museum in Szczecin, Neue Galerie in Graz, and various private collections around the globe. Silomäki's art received recognition with the awarding of the Finnish State Prize for Photographic Art, 2017 and FOTOFINLANDIA Prize, 2004.

== Selected series ==
Silomäki describes himself as a "photographer with a special focus on the narrative documentary genre". Throughout the years, the key element of his artworks has been the link between the singular self and overall historical narratives, building a bridge between the familiar and the unknown, the local and the global. Working on numerous long-term, open-ended projects he develops an extended and unique way of storytelling.

=== My Weather Diary (2001–) ===
In his diary-like series My Weather Diary he joins photography with hand-written narrative elements. Along with the location, he describes an event in his personal life or a memorable piece of world-political news of the day. By doing so, Silomäki gives the viewer a possibility to share his individual experiences in the depicted landscape and fuse them to a collective happening. His personal notes allow an emotional form of identification. "The starting point of this work was that world events, personal events and weather will always repeat themselves and merge into one large continuum", the artist states. In the era of climate change, the series has also taken on a whole new social tone.

=== We Are The Revolution, after Joseph Beuys ===
His series is based upon and inspired by the famous work of Joseph Beuys La Rivoluzione Siamo Noi from 1972. Silomäki follows Beuys’ idea that society could alter through art and by that he reflects the Fluxus belief of “everyone being an artist”. The series highlights his intent of activating a social awareness and the way how people as individuals can approach it through their daily lives. Silomäki states:

“Beuys is walking with great confidence towards the camera, suggesting that we, the viewers, could form a revolution if we joined him. Beuys was a political artist, who considered art as a currency that could change society. I somewhat reversed Beuys’s idea, by following instead an individual who became an object of the inevitable forces of history rather than their master. Like a tourist, I traveled to historically significant sites and took photographs of me being there. But my artistic intention and experience were different from that of a tourist: I was there to walk as many steps as was the number of victims in the major political tragedies which made those particular sites historically significant.”

=== Atlas of Emotions ===
Silomäki examines the crossroads in the lives of anonymous people from around the world who participate in online discussion forums hiding behind alter-ego screen names. While editing those internet posts together into a script, he staged the authors’ homes in his studio, based on hints in the writings themselves. Then actors and actresses portrayed the reinvented scenery. By adding hand-written notes on the surface of the staged photographs, he connects image with text and displays extracts from the lives of those people, in their own native languages. The viewer is linked to something general as well as to the specific and private, diving into people’s fears, desires, and dreams.
