= Walter Andersin =

Finnish schoolteacher and politician (1871–1944)

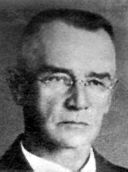
Walter Andersin

Walter August Andersin (2 November 1871 – 16 November 1944) was a Finnish judge and politician, born in Rantasalmi. He was a member of the Parliament of Finland from June to October 1909, representing the Finnish Party. He was a member of the Senate of Finland from 1909 to 1917. Andersin was a member of the Supreme Court of Finland from 1919 to 1941.
