= Räisänen =

Räisänen is an eastern Finnish surname. Notable people with the surname include:

- Yrjö Räisänen (1888–1948), Finnish politician
- Tapio Räisänen (born 1949), Finnish ski jumper
- Antti Räisänen (born 1950), Finnish scientist
- Tomi Räisänen (born 1976), Finnish composer
- Timo Räisänen (born 1979), Swedish musician
- Meeri Räisänen (born 1989), Finnish ice hockey goaltender
- Otso Räisänen (born 1994), Finnish freestyle skier
