= Parkano =

- City
- Parkanon kaupunki Parkano stad
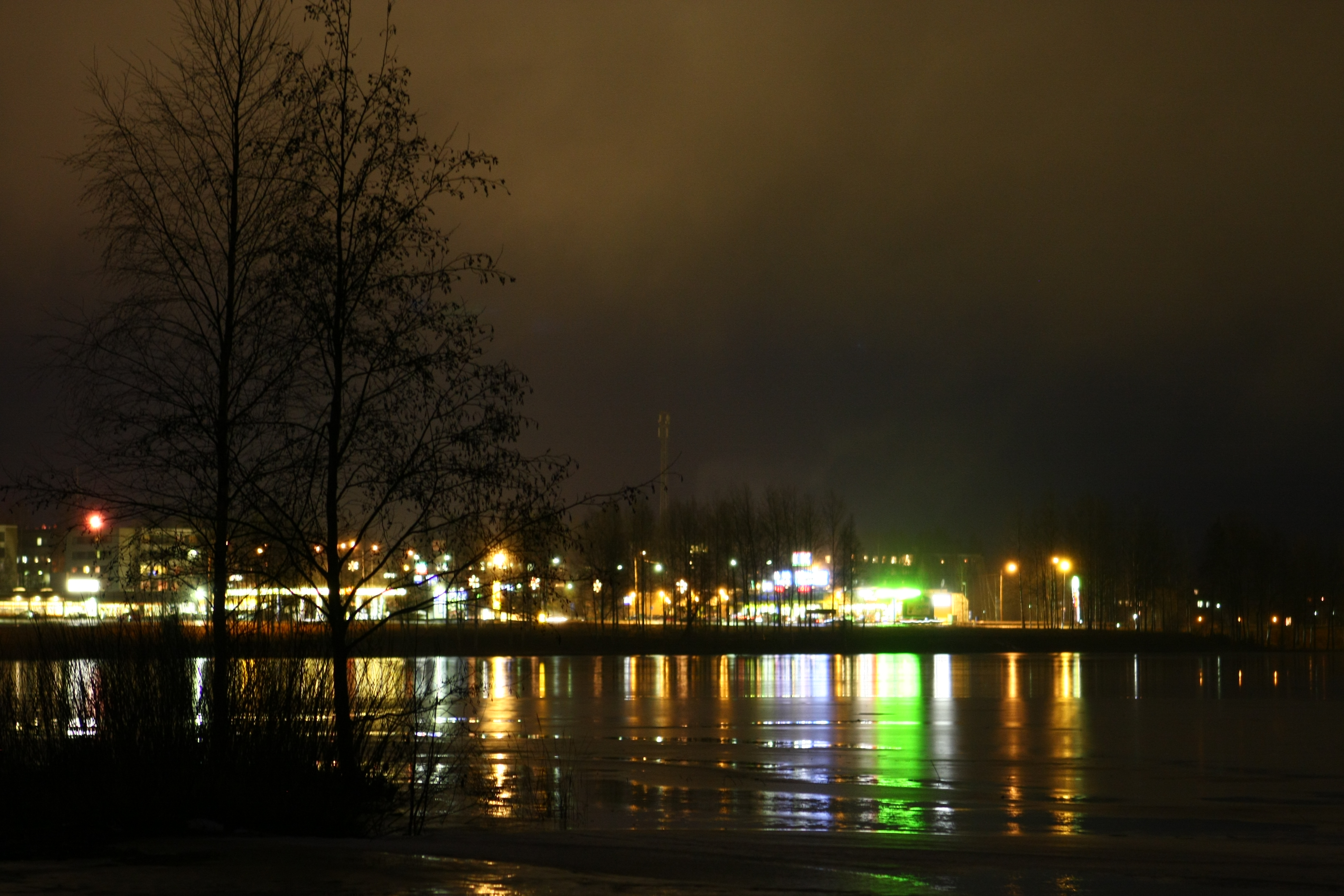

- Coat of arms

- Location of Parkano in Finland
- Interactive map of Parkano
- Coordinates: 62°00.5′N 023°01.5′E
- Country: Finland
- Region: Pirkanmaa
- Sub-region: North Western Pirkanmaa
- Charter: 1867

Government
  - City manager: Jari Heiniluoma

Area (2018-01-01)
  - Total: 909.67 km^{2} (351.23 sq mi)
  - Land: 853.19 km^{2} (329.42 sq mi)
  - Water: 57.5 km^{2} (22.2 sq mi)
  - Rank: 90th largest in Finland

Population (2025-12-31)
  - Total: 6,011
  - Rank: 154th largest in Finland
  - Density: 7.05/km^{2} (18.3/sq mi)

Population by native language
  - Finnish: 96.4% (official)
  - Others: 3.6%

Population by age
  - 0 to 14: 13.7%
  - 15 to 64: 53%
  - 65 or older: 33.3%
- Time zone: UTC+02:00 (EET)
  - Summer (DST): UTC+03:00 (EEST)
- Website: www.parkano.fi

Parkano (Finnish: [ˈpɑrkɑno]) is a town and municipality in Finland.

It is located 84 kilometres (52 mi) north of Tampere in the Pirkanmaa region. The population of Parkano is 6,011 (December 31, 2025) and the municipality covers an area of 853.19 km^{2} (329.42 sq mi) of which 57.50 km^{2} (22.20 sq mi) is inland water (January 1, 2018). The population density is 7.05/km^{2} (18.3/sq mi).

The municipality is unilingually Finnish.

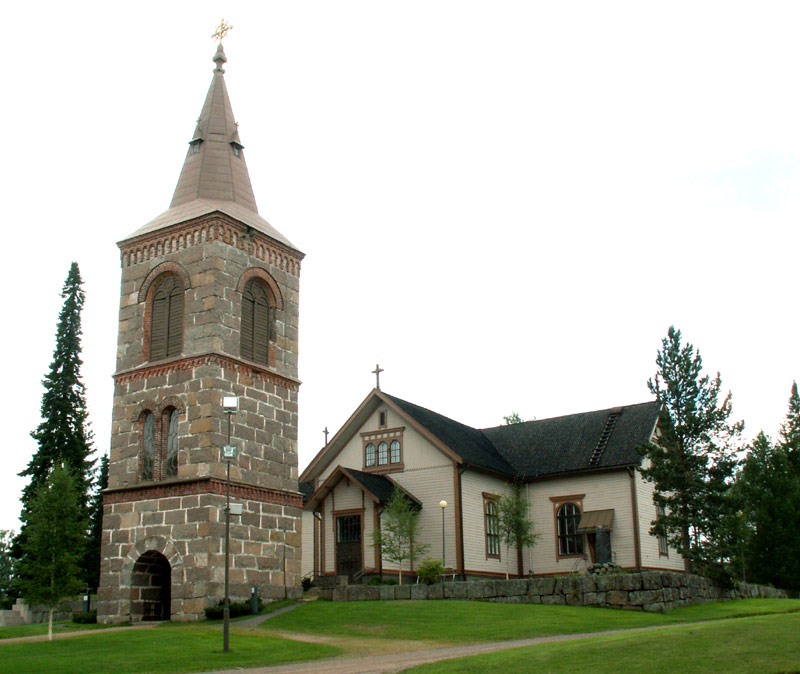
Parkano church was built in 1800 and the bell tower in front of it in 1889. Lightning struck the church on Midsummer's Day in 1928, killing four people.

== Transport ==
The private coach company OnniBus route Helsinki—Seinäjoki—Vaasa has a stop at Parkano.

== Districts ==
- Keskusta
- Kairokoski / Haapanen
- Viinikka
- Kallio
- Pahkala
- Vatunen
- Pentti
- Kissakivi
- Haukkala

== Notable people ==
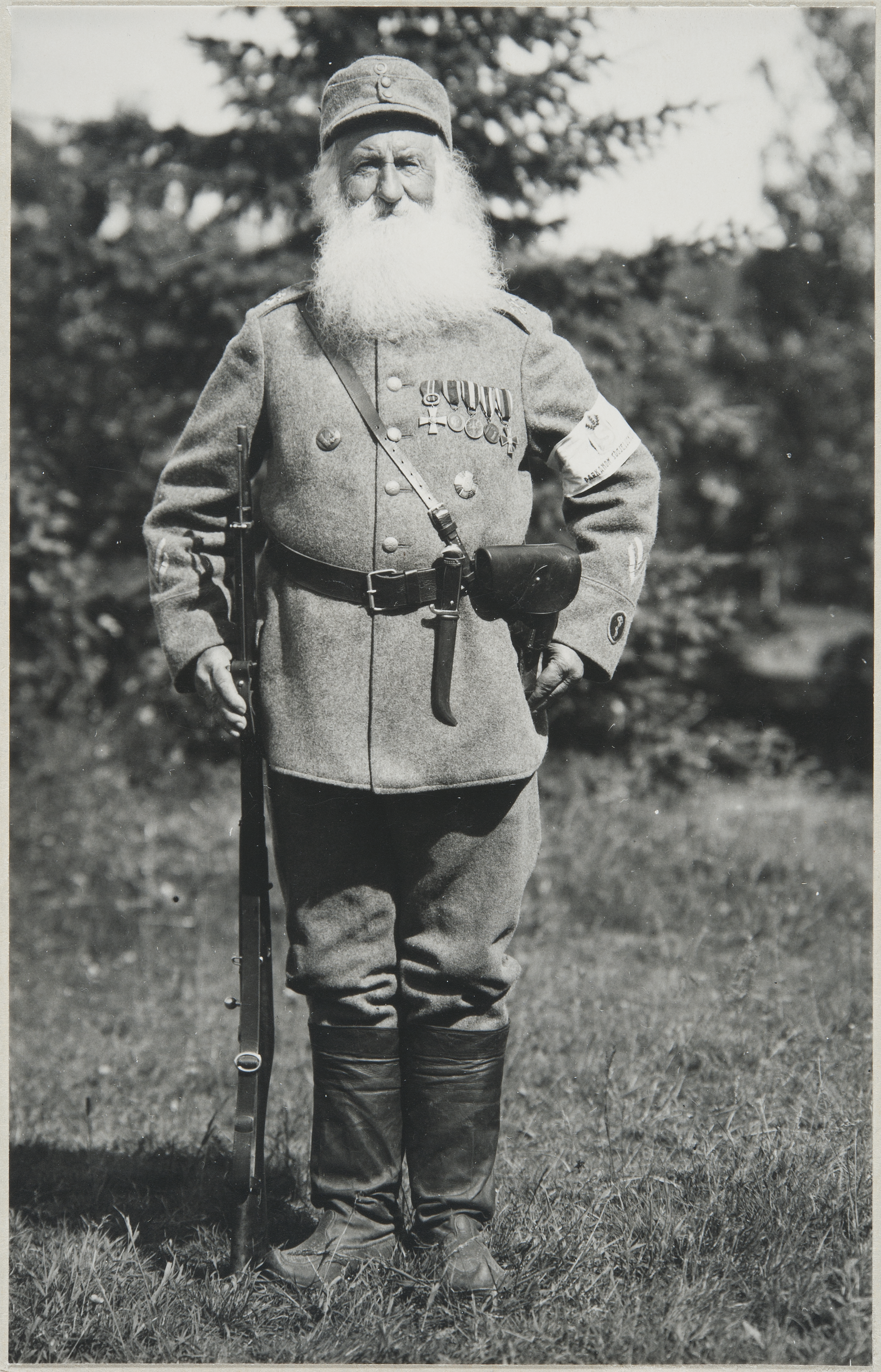
"Parkanon parooni"

- The most famous person to live in Parkano is probably "baron of Parkano", Gustaf Wrede af Elimä (1853-1939)
- Signe Brander (1869–1942)
- Yrjö Pulkkinen (1875–1945)
- Walto Tuomioja (1888–1931)
- Kari Asikainen (born 1939)
- Kai Suikkanen (born 1959)
- Saija Varjus (born 1965)
- Johanna Lehtinen (born 1979)
- Toni Rajala (born 1991)
