= 2006 Finnish presidential election =

- 15 January 2006 (first round); 29 January 2006 (second round)
- Turnout: 70.82% (first round); 74.05% (second round)
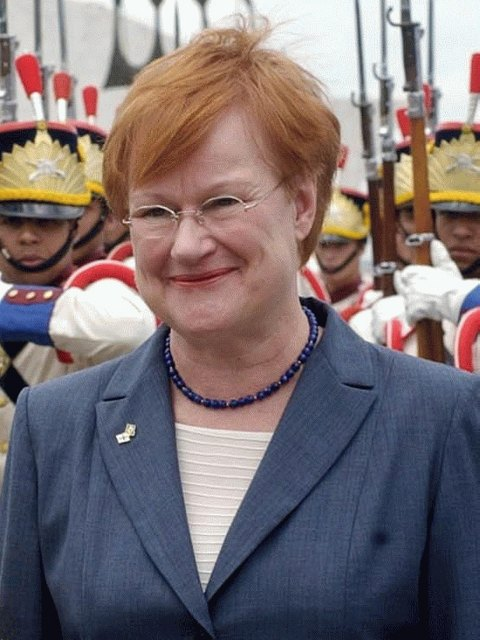

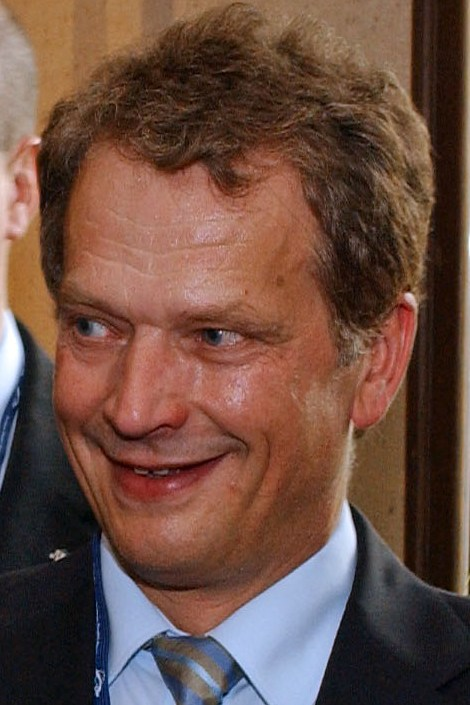
Candidate	Tarja Halonen	Sauli Niinistö
Party	SDP	National Coalition
Popular vote	1,630,980	1,518,333
Percentage	51.79%	48.21%
- Halonen: 40–45% 45–50% 50–55% 55–60% 65–70% Niinistö: 50–55% 55–60% 60–65% Vanhanen: 35–40% 40–45%
President before election
Tarja Halonen
SDP
Elected President
Tarja Halonen
SDP

Presidential elections were held in Finland on 15 and 29 January 2006 which resulted in the re-election of Tarja Halonen as President of Finland for a second six-year term.

The first round of voting in Finnish presidential elections always takes place on the third Sunday of January, in this case 15 January 2006. As no candidate received more than half of the vote, a second round was held on 29 January between the two highest placed candidates from the first round, Tarja Halonen and Sauli Niinistö. Tarja Halonen, the incumbent, won the final round by 3.6 percentage points. The newly elected president formally took office for her second term on 1 March, and would have done so on 1 February, had no run-off been necessary (Constitution 55 §).

Advance voting is possible in Finnish elections, and the dates for this in the first round were the 4th, 5th and 7th to 10 January. Finnish citizens voting abroad could vote from the 4th to the 7th of January. An advantage to advance voting is that those doing so have a wider choice of polling stations (typically post offices, such as the one shown here), whereas on the actual election day the polling stations are fixed, usually schools, libraries or town halls.

== Candidates ==
The candidates are listed below following their candidate numbers. This list was confirmed by the Electoral District Committee of Helsinki on 15 December 2005.

1. (See below)
2. Bjarne Kallis (Christian Democrats)
3. Sauli Niinistö (National Coalition Party)
4. Timo Soini (True Finns)
5. Heidi Hautala (Green League)
6. Henrik Lax (Swedish People's Party)
7. Matti Vanhanen (Centre Party); the incumbent Prime Minister of Finland,
8. Arto Lahti (independent)
9. Tarja Halonen (Social Democratic Party; also supported by the Left Alliance); the current incumbent

The law states that candidate numbers start from the number 2. There are various justifications for this, such as preventing any candidate from using the slogan "number 1" for publicity, preventing ambiguity between the numbers 1 and 7, or preventing votes from being accidentally discounted because of a resemblance to a tickmark.

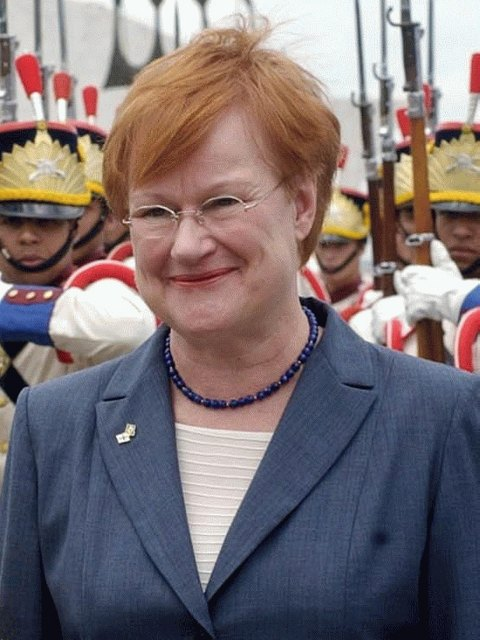
Tarja Halonen candidate of the Social Democratic Party of Finland, winner of 1st round with 46.3% of votes

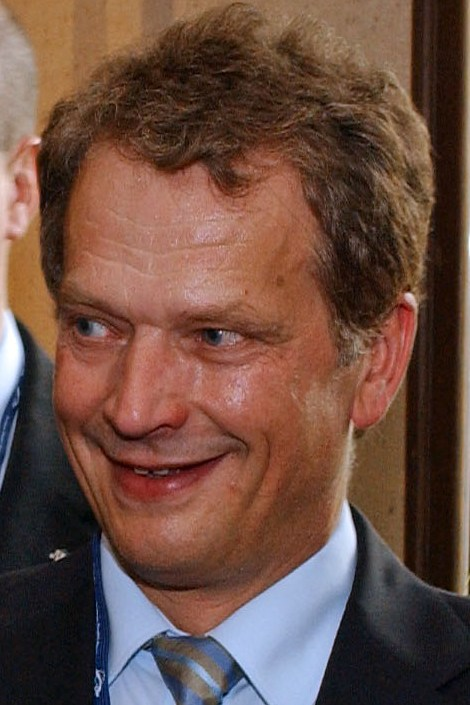
Sauli Niinistö candidate of the National Coalition Party, finished 2nd on 1st round with 24.1% of the votes

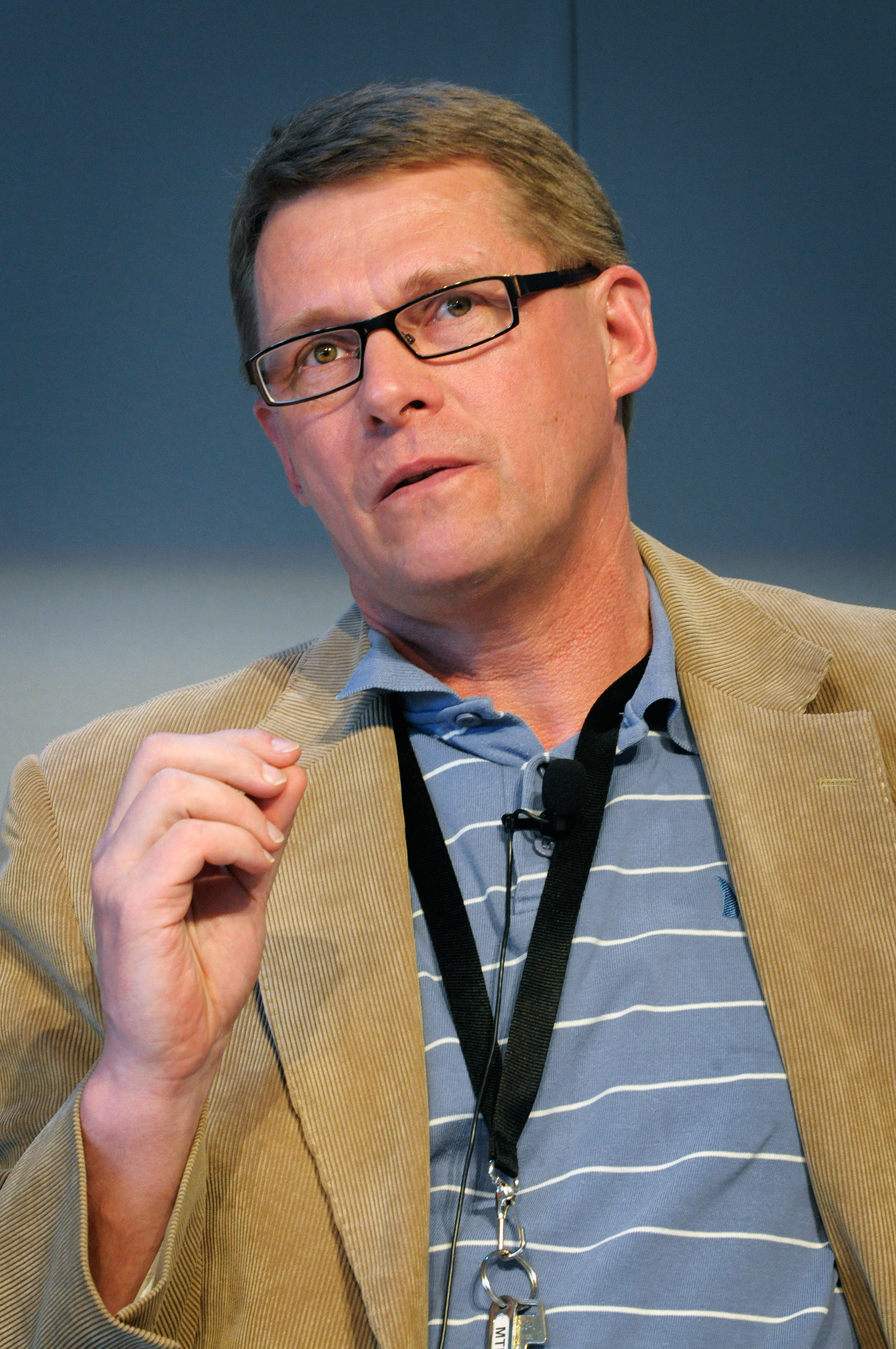
Matti Vanhanen candidate of the Centre Party, finished 3rd on 1st round with 18.6% of the votes

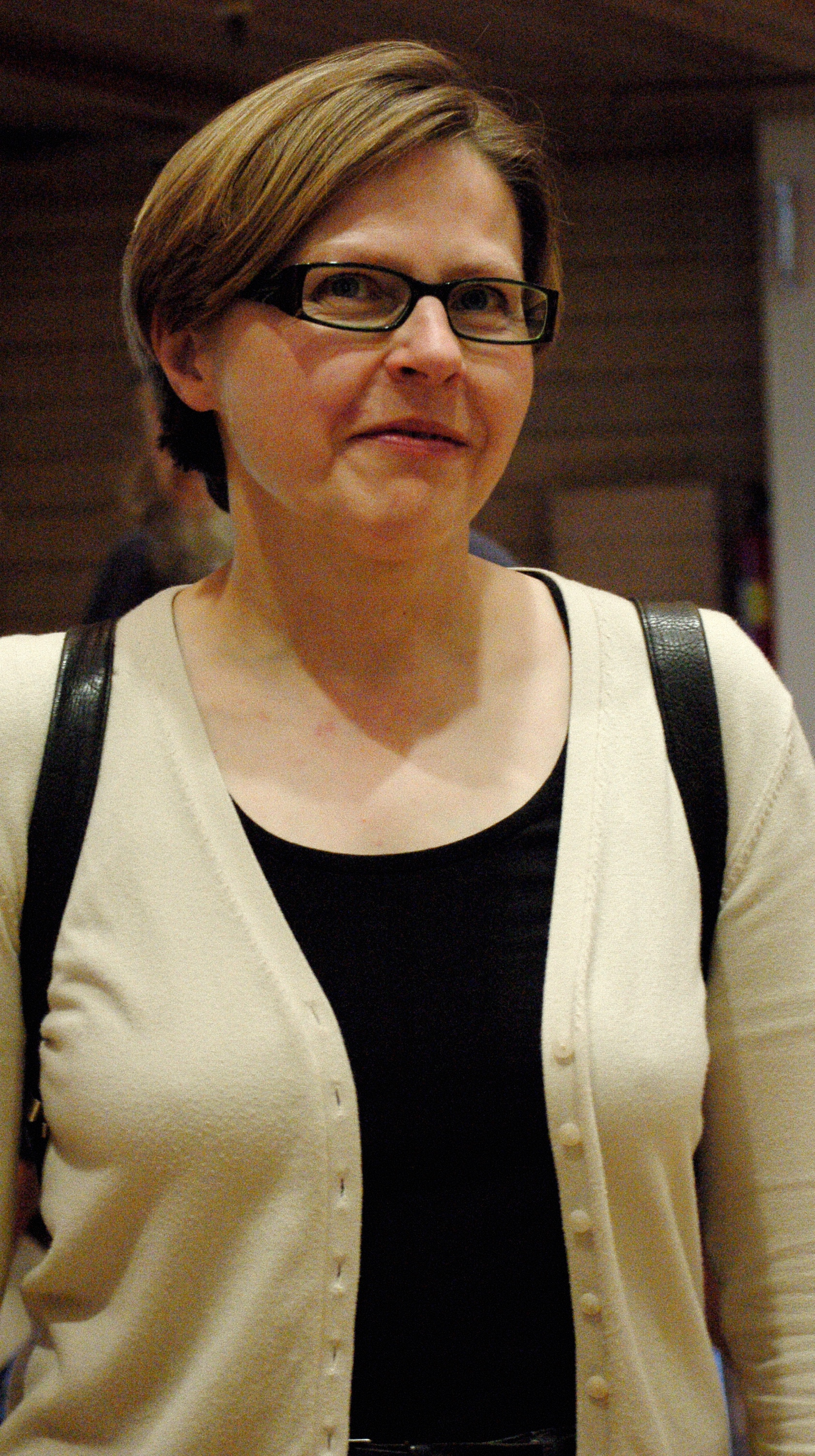
Heidi Hautala candidate of the Green League, finished 4th on 1st round with 3.5% of the votes

== Campaign ==
=== Themes ===
The main theme of discussion in the campaign preceding the election was the President's powers and whether they should be limited further. The Green League's candidate Heidi Hautala suggested that the President be completely stripped of all powers relating to foreign affairs and foreign policy, but this proposal met with fierce resistance from the three candidates of the largest parties – Tarja Halonen, Matti Vanhanen and Sauli Niinistö. Halonen, the main left-wing candidate and incumbent president, has further indicated that the president's powers should not be increased either, since it would, in her opinion, reduce the degree of democratic decision-making.

Another important election theme was the threat of international terrorism and how to counter it. The main right-wing candidate, Sauli Niinistö, stated in the last presidential debate that he would consider Finland's membership "in a more European" North Atlantic Treaty Organization (NATO) after 2008 to achieve such an end, but this was strongly rejected by the other main candidates. The only candidate openly embracing NATO-membership was the other right-wing candidate, Henrik Lax, of the Swedish People's Party. According to a poll carried out by the Taloustutkimus polling agency in July 2005, most Finnish people believe that NATO membership would increase the risk of international terrorism in Finland instead of decreasing it. This is also the view held by Vanhanen, of the Centre Party, and Halonen.

Other themes included Christian values emphasised by Bjarne Kallis; stronger ties around the Baltic Sea and a stronger European Union by Henrik Lax; criticism of the EU by Timo Soini and the state of entrepreneurship and the returning of Karelia by Arto Lahti.

Sauli Niinistö raised the state of work as another theme. His campaign slogan was "President of the workers" (Työväen presidentti) and this provoked many union activists and left-wing supporters and voters. However, he was also criticised for trying to lure left-wing voters to vote for him with this slogan. Niinistö's campaign stated that there was neither "left-wing work" nor "right-wing work" but only Finnish work for Finnish welfare.

=== Conan O'Brien ===
American late night talk show host Conan O'Brien endorsed re-election for Tarja Halonen on his show due to a long-standing joke about his resemblance to incumbent president Halonen. The skits, commentary, and mock campaign ads were seen on Late Night with Conan O'Brien on SubTV, a Finnish cable channel, five days a week (with a brief delay). Markku Jääskeläinen, Halonen's campaign manager, noted that the frequent mention of Halonen's name was positive for their campaign, and the running bits on the show attracted international attention to the election.

== Opinion polls ==
Here is a collection of latest poll results. The opinion pollsters' methods may vary, as do the samples and the conducting time, which give the differences.

runoff election	MTV3 16-18/01	HS 16–17/01
3 Sauli Niinistö	45 %	47 %
9 Tarja Halonen	55 %	53 %

first round	Yle 10–11/01	MTV3 weeks 52, 1 and 2	HS 05–07/01	HS 27–29/12	AL 12–29/12	HS 07–17/12	Yle 09/12	HS 05/11	Yle 05/11
2 Bjarne Kallis	1 %	1 %	2 %	2 %	1,4 %	2 %	1 %	1 %	1 %
3 Sauli Niinistö	20 %	19 %	21 %	20 %	20,3 %	20 %	18 %	24 %	19 %
4 Timo Soini	4 %	3 %	3 %	2 %	1,4 %	2 %	1 %	1 %	1 %
5 Heidi Hautala	4 %	3 %	3 %	2 %	2,3 %	2 %	2 %	3 %	1 %
6 Henrik Lax	1 %	1 %	1 %	1 %	1,0 %	1 %	1 %	1 %	1 %
7 Matti Vanhanen	18 %	17 %	18 %	18 %	16,5 %	19 %	19 %	18 %	15 %
8 Arto Lahti	1 %	< 1%	< 1%	1 %	0,9 %	1 %	na^{7}	na^{8}	na^{9}
9 Tarja Halonen	52 %	55 %	51 %	54 %	56,2 %	55 %	58 %	52 %	61 %

The total percentages may exceed 100% due to rounding.

Two of the latest polls made by Taloustutkimus^{[7]} and Suomen Gallup^{[9]} raised discussion over whether Halonen would gain the 50%+ majority of the votes necessary to win the election in a single round. According to Helsingin Sanomat, the reason why Halonen's support has decreased in polls might be an increase in the number of people not wanting to reveal their favourite candidate: some of them plead to the secrecy of voting. The airtime and space given by the media for the candidates may have given the candidates with smaller support the opportunity to bring their opinions to the public, which might add to their support in the polls in question.

On the other hand, the latest poll conducted by Research International (^{2}) showed no change in Halonen's popularity between the three different weeks.

The candidates and their supporters read their polls for their advantage. In Timo Soini's mind there was a big surprise waiting in the ballot boxes; he did, in fact, receive 3.4% of the vote, which was much more than the support for his True Finns party in the last parliamentary election. Tarja Halonen stated this election as being the only one showing such a big support to her: "The crossbar is trembling just right", she said on January 10, meaning the excitement of getting the majority of the votes. Sauli Niinistö publicly stated that there would be a second round between him and Halonen.

== Results ==
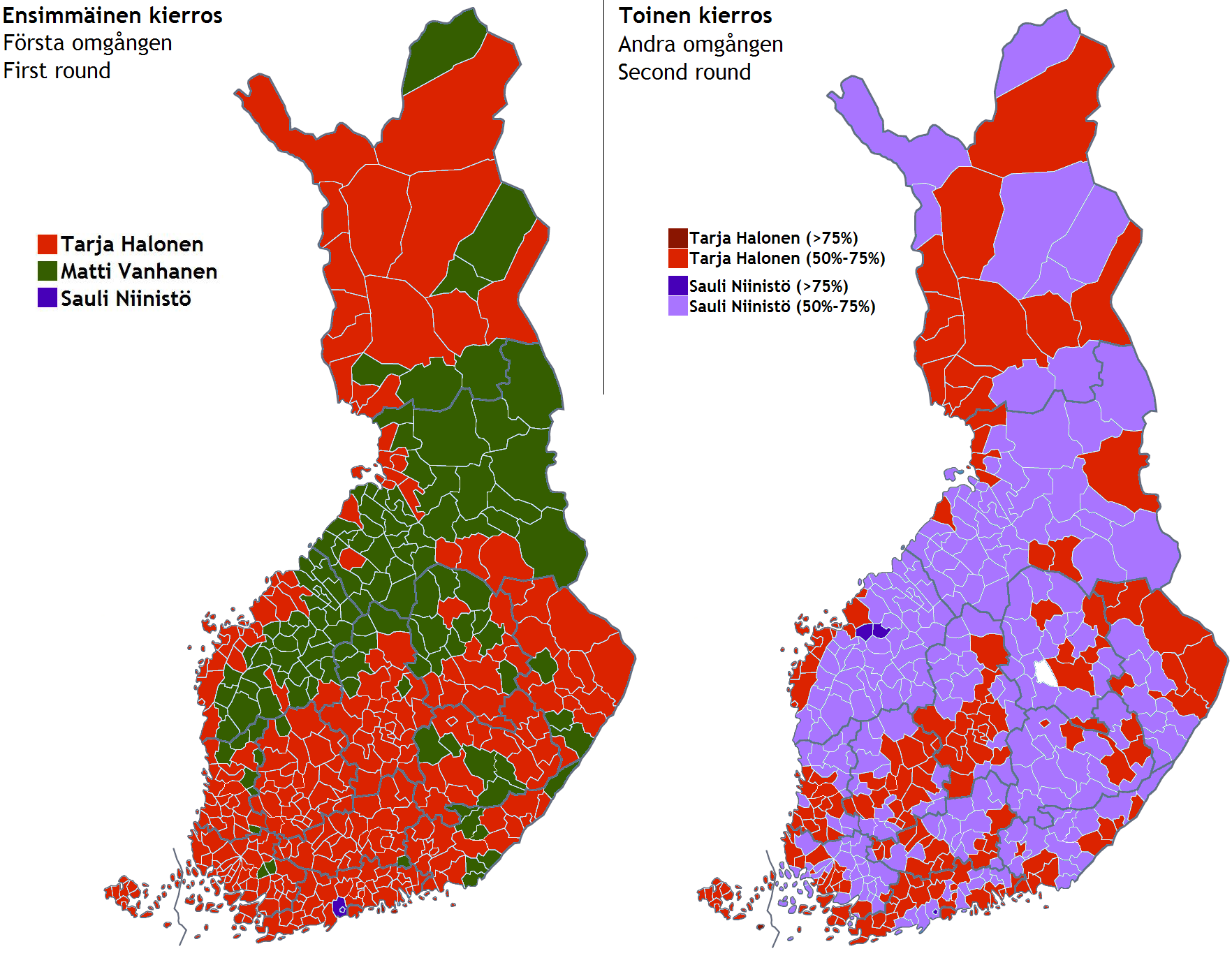
The candidate in plurality in each municipality of Finland on the first (left) round (represents the geographical distribution but not population of supporters in plurality) and the candidate in majority on the second round (right).

Voting took place from 09:00 to 20:00 on both of the two election days, with specifically designated periods for advance voting before both the first and second rounds. Every municipality was required by law to have at least one polling station. Voting was organised abroad for expatriate Finnish citizens at Finnish embassies, consulates and honorary consulates worldwide. The candidates were voted for directly by the electorate. Votes were counted nationally.

The counting of advance votes started at 15:00, and was expected to finish before 20:00, when the first preliminary results were announced. The preliminary counting of the election day votes began at 20:00, after which the votes were delivered to the central election committee in Helsinki, which performed a recount. The definitive result in Finnish presidential elections is required by law to be confirmed on the following Tuesday at 10:00 at the latest. However, enough votes are normally counted during the first hour after polling stations close for an unofficial, but clear, result to be announced.

A second round run-off was held on 29 January 2006 between Tarja Halonen (Social Democratic Party) and Sauli Niinistö (National Coalition Party).

Opinion polls predicted a close election. A January 19 poll (HS Gallup) gave Halonen 53% and Niinistö 47% of the vote. By comparison, in October 2005 a clear majority of 70% would have voted for Halonen when asked to choose between her and Niinistö.

Four of the six candidates who did not make it to the second round, Matti Vanhanen, Bjarne Kallis, Henrik Lax and Arto Lahti publicly expressed their support for Sauli Niinistö in the runoff election. This reflects a loose alliance termed porvariyhteistyö in the Finnish media, (roughly translated as "bourgeois collaboration"). According to Niinistö and Vanhanen, the main centre-right parties (the National Coalition Party and the Centre Party) had agreed about a year earlier on some level of co-operation to better compete with Halonen, who was supported by both the Social Democrats and Left Alliance.

Candidate	Party	First round		Second round	
Candidate	Party	Votes	%	Votes	%
Tarja Halonen	Social Democratic Party	1,397,030	46.31	1,630,980	51.79
Sauli Niinistö	National Coalition Party	725,866	24.06	1,518,333	48.21
Matti Vanhanen	Centre Party	561,990	18.63		
Heidi Hautala	Green League	105,248	3.49		
Timo Soini	True Finns	103,492	3.43		
Bjarne Kallis	Christian Democrats	61,483	2.04		
Henrik Lax	Swedish People's Party	48,703	1.61		
Arto Lahti	Independent	12,989	0.43		
Total		3,016,801	100.00	3,149,313	100.00
Valid votes		3,016,801	99.71	3,149,313	99.55
Invalid/blank votes		8,805	0.29	14,354	0.45
Total votes		3,025,606	100.00	3,163,667	100.00
Registered voters/turnout		4,272,537	70.82	4,272,537	74.05
Source: IFES, IFES

=== First round results by region ===
Province	Tarja Halonen	Sauli Niinistö	Matti Vanhanen	Heidi Hautala	Timo Soini	Bjarne Kallis	Henrik Lax	Arto Lahti	Electorate	Votes	Valid votes	Invalid votes
South Savo	41,939	17,448	24,944	1,890	2,914	1,766	187	343	129,079	91,812	91,431	381
North Savo	62,276	23,964	40,128	3,158	5,426	2,251	332	513	197,683	138,352	138,048	304
North Karelia	41,812	15,605	25,274	2,244	4,520	1,682	177	351	132,825	91,942	91,665	277
Kainuu	19,659	6,380	16,001	725	1,784	706	84	172	67,545	45,629	45,511	118
Uusimaa	366,169	253,635	71,823	45,389	22,345	14,281	16,991	3,602	1,025,287	796,461	794,235	2,226
Eastern Uusimaa	24,352	12,292	6,739	2,176	1,159	1,023	5,475	208	69,688	53,543	53,424	119
Southwest Finland	130,953	73,296	36,741	9,801	8,754	3,990	4,372	1,196	355,961	269,907	269,103	804
Kanta-Häme	49,183	24,500	15,860	2,330	3,038	1,758	276	440	131,359	97,664	97,385	279
Päijät-Häme	55,884	29,570	17,026	2,819	4,370	2,279	347	624	156,066	113,212	112,919	293
Kymenlaakso	53,592	25,472	17,055	2,269	4,579	1,957	450	583	146,922	106,412	105,957	455
South Karelia	36,593	17,960	17,662	1,734	2,992	1,361	206	481	107,949	79,230	78,989	241
Central Finland	75,328	27,239	34,830	4,740	6,088	3,449	342	552	209,443	153,025	152,568	457
Southern Ostrobothnia	33,091	23,107	45,989	1,282	4,881	3,184	160	317	150,707	112,339	112,011	328
Ostrobothnia	47,288	15,466	12,192	2,508	1,946	6,294	15,133	227	132,754	101,359	101,054	305
Satakunta	71,633	28,339	26,793	2,512	5,147	2,184	357	897	185,999	138,255	137,862	393
Pirkanmaa	134,067	72,352	37,063	10,795	10,819	5,593	1,002	1,237	364,658	273,777	272,928	849
Central Ostrobothnia	13,322	5,366	14,904	608	1,529	3,654	870	92	53,660	40,430	40,345	85
Northern Ostrobothnia	82,342	36,595	67,230	5,632	7,433	2,806	386	741	280,672	203,656	203,165	491
Lapland	49,524	16,293	33,282	2,139	3,750	1,113	153	393	145,532	106,957	106,647	310
Åland	8,023	987	454	497	18	152	1,403	20	19,603	11,644	11,554	90

=== Second round results by region ===
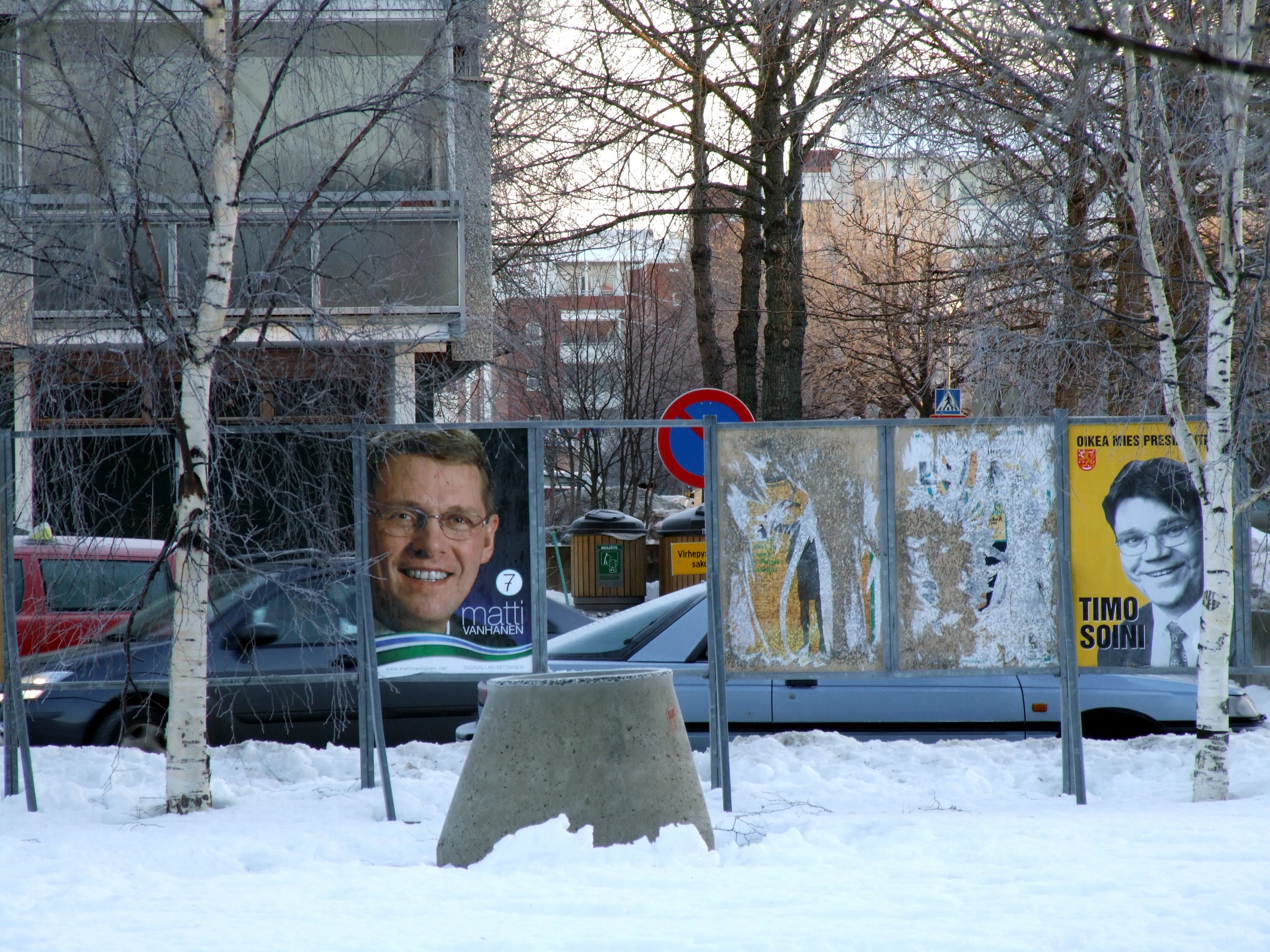
Finnish presidential election 2006 candidate posters

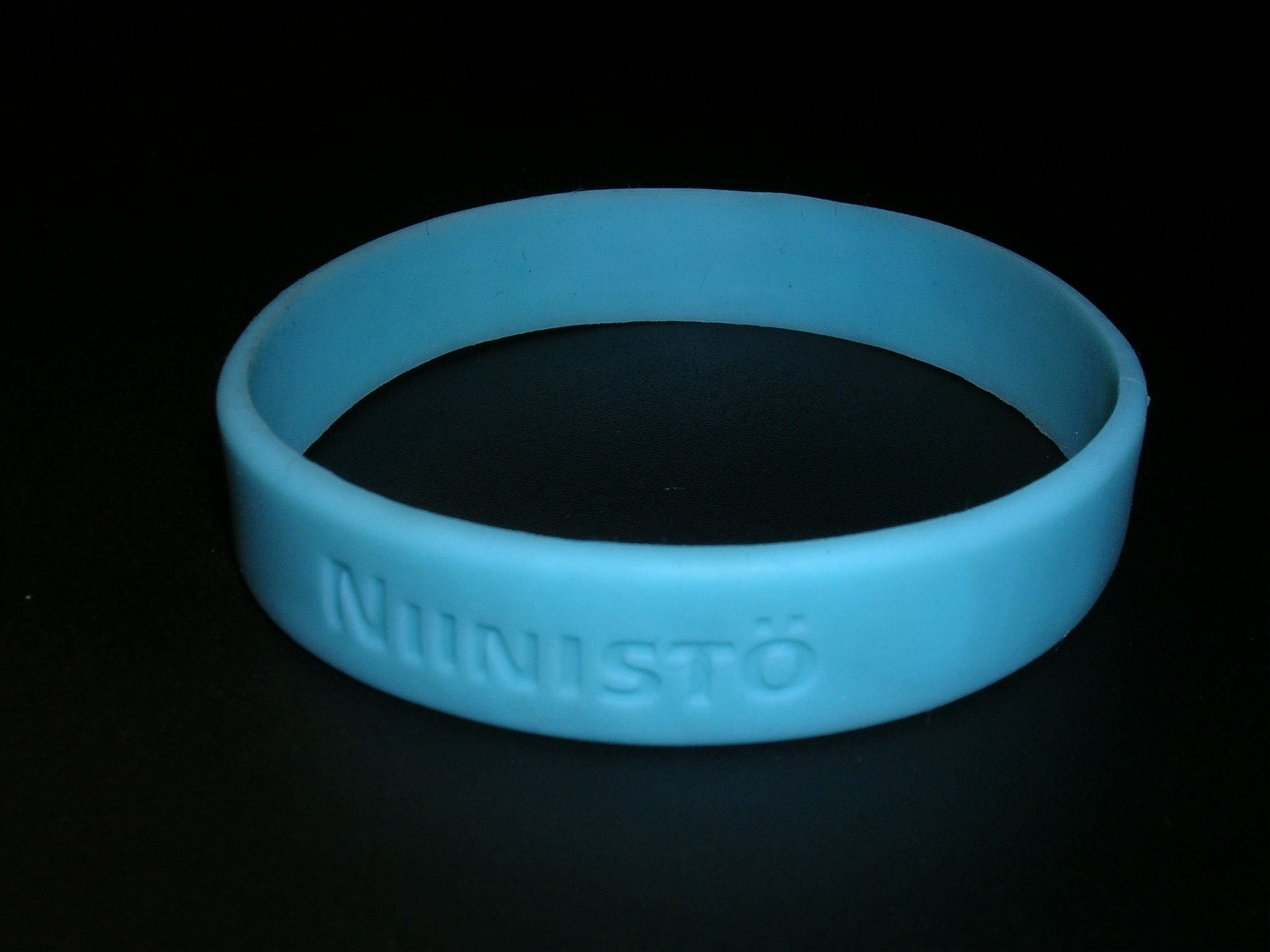
Wristband with the inscription Niinistö distributed as a promotional item for the 2006 election

Province	Tarja Halonen	Sauli Niinistö	Electorate	Votes	Valid votes	Invalid votes
South Savo	47,651	47,329	129,079	95,496	94,980	516
North Savo	73,385	70,060	197,683	144,124	143,445	679
North Karelia	49,887	45,744	132,825	96,117	95,631	486
Kainuu	23,881	23,126	67,545	47,242	47,007	235
Uusimaa	429,938	401,466	1,025,287	834,807	831,404	3,403
Eastern Uusimaa	28,348	27,205	69,688	55,764	55,553	211
Southwest Finland	149,753	130,990	355,961	282,047	280,743	1,304
Kanta-Häme	55,577	46,649	131,359	102,734	102,226	508
Päijät-Häme	63,595	56,272	156,066	120,343	119,867	476
Kymenlaakso	60,880	50,666	146,922	112,085	111,546	539
South Karelia	41,433	41,057	107,949	82,870	82,490	380
Central Finland	88,668	70,495	209,443	159,952	159,163	789
Southern Ostrobothnia	39,758	74,467	150,707	114,867	114,225	642
Ostrobothnia	55,386	49,347	132,754	105,162	104,733	429
Satakunta	80,985	63,292	185,999	144,915	144,277	638
Pirkanmaa	156,183	130,229	364,658	287,706	286,412	1,294
Central Ostrobothnia	16,952	23,990	53,660	41,158	40,942	216
Northern Ostrobothnia	100,860	110,871	280,672	212,613	211,731	882
Lapland	59,521	51,045	145,532	111,195	110,566	629
Åland	8,339	4,033	19,603	12,470	12,372	98
