= SMARAD =

Finnish research center

SMARAD is the Finnish Center of Excellence in Smart Radios and Wireless Research, and is part of the Aalto University. The Director is Professor Antti Räisänen. SMARAD conducts high-level research and training in radio science and engineering and Wireless data communications. Key areas of research include high frequency, microwave and millimetre wave engineering, multi-antenna systems, multi-standard radios, the design of integrated circuits for data communications and signal processing in wireless data communications. Intelligent multi-antenna systems and multi-standard radios allow for more efficient and flexible use of radio spectrum. Intelligent radio sensors and millimetre wave cameras are used among other things to improve the efficiency and safety of passenger and freight transport and the performance of industrial processes.
