= The Helsinki School =

Photographic artists who studied under Timothy Persons

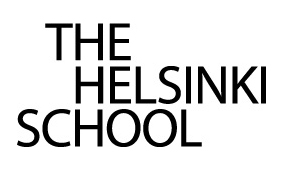

The Helsinki School was a name introduced in an article by Boris Hohmeyer, Aufbruch im hohen Norden (Breakthrough in the Far North), in Art Das Kunstmagazin in 2003. This was the first time it was used as a brand name to describe a selection of artists who had studied under adjunct professor Timothy Persons at the University of Art & Design in Espoo from the beginning of the 1990s (since 2010 Aalto University, School of Arts, Design & Architecture). So far, with over a 180 international publications, the Helsinki School represents a collaborative approach, where students of photography, not only work together by presenting each other's works but, exhibit with their professors, mentors and former alumni in a joint effort to share in mutual contextual dialogue that uses the photographic process as a tool for thinking.

== History ==
In the beginning of the 1990s the University of Art & Design Helsinki (since 2010 part of the new Aalto University), Finland, embarked upon an educational experiment that challenged and initiated new approaches in teaching and preparing soon to be MA graduates for their professional careers. Yrjö Sotamaa the then acting Rector of the University, envisioned a program that would offer as well as create a different set of measurements in how one would evaluate graduating MA students. Led by the adjunct professor Timothy Persons and a group of his academic colleagues, Jorma Puranen, Ulla Jokisalo and Timo Kelaranta, and Jyrki Parantainen, they adapted an Open Studio approach in how to teach through an emphasis on content, collaboration and experimental exercises. Timothy Persons who had done his graduate studies in Southern California during the 1970s at the Claremont Graduate University, was a recipient of that Open Studio ideology that was being championed by John Baldessari at CalArts and its sister school in Claremont at the time. Persons through his Professional Studies Program, built upon this Southern California model, by taking the class out of the classroom and into the various international art venues as means for experimenting, teaching, referencing and experiencing the realities of what a professional career demanded. This was realised through the creation of a virtual gallery known as Gallery TaiK, now Persons Projects. By joining all these generations together, it became the vehicle used by the Helsinki School artists to present their works on an international level through its participation in art fairs, publications, Pop-Up exhibitions and museum shows. The gallery was established in 1995 in Helsinki, however, since 2005 its permanent exhibition space has been located in Berlin. Its primary responsibility is to prepare and guide the students in how to manage their professional life. To this day it is directed by adjunct Professor Timothy Persons and Asia Żak Persons.

The Helsinki School was based upon a Professional Studies program that used its academic platform to create an environment that blended its teachers, students and former graduates together in a contextual dialogue through group exhibitions, publications and the utilization of the international art fairs as a means for teaching, referencing and presenting these artists' works to the international community. It is grounded on an approach that introduces the students in how to use criticism as a positive tool. This places the emphasis more on how to find solutions rather than the fear of making mistakes. Aalto University School of Arts, Design & Architecture supports and encourages the use of contemporary pedagogical methods including collaborative knowledge building and co-design in which students may also teach and learn from each other through their shared experiences. A good example of this is in internship programs in which selected students travel abroad to work in residencies, galleries and other professional platforms.

== Characteristics ==
The Helsinki School follows other of two key photographic movements: The New American Color Photography which established color photography as an important artistic medium, beginning with the William Eggleston exhibition at the MoMA in New York in 1976. And the Düsseldorf School, which emerged in the late 1970s under the guidance of Bernd and Hilla Becher, followers of the 1920s German tradition of Neue Sachlichkeit (New Objectivity). Their students, Andreas Gursky, Candida Höfer, Thomas Ruff and Thomas Struth modified the approach by applying new technical possibilities and contemporary vision. These movements combined with the influence of the Icelandic minimalism and artists like Donald Judd, played a pivotal role in understanding the roots of the Helsinki School.

The Helsinki School's defining trait is the use of the photographic process as a tool for conceptual thinking.

"There is a clarity of vision that seems to come out of the late evening northern summer light. The conceptual base is lucidly presented. There is an honesty and sincerity behind the work that is rare to find among a group of artists, (…) the borderland discourse, which touches the very idea of identity. Many Helsinki School pictures bear signs of Finnish culture, unconscious or not, meanings related to nature and remoteness. This is quite natural in a country so sparsely populated. These photographs seem to be presentations of artists who sink with themselves. (...) Their photographs seem to be covering something, preferably hiding and hinting than saying anything direct. Yes, there is ambiguity, yes there is a Northern loneliness, but it speaks very directly. There is a sense of isolation in the way several of the artists express their identity. Instead of direct contact with somebody in the picture, photographs became full of landscapes, empty spaces, and figures somewhere in distance." - Alistair Hicks (2014)

== Artists ==
Pentti Sammallahti and Arno Rafael Minkkinen were the original mentors who inspired the first generation of artists like Jorma Puranen, Ulla Jokisalo and Timo Kelaranta.

The next generations include artists such as Jyrki Parantainen, Marjaana Kella, Pertti Kekarainen, Joakim Eskildsen, Ilkka Halso, Tiina Itkonen, Elina Brotherus, Aino Kannisto, Ola Kolehmainen, Santeri Tuori, Niko Luoma, Sanna Kannisto, Ville Lenkkeri, and Jari Silomäki.

== Group exhibitions ==
2020

- Female Positions from the Helsinki School, 2020, Fotografisk Center, Copenhagen, Denmark
- The Helsinki School: The Nature of Being, 2020, Persons Projects, Berlin
- A Kiss Given by Time to Light, 2020, Persons Projects, Berlin
- Nurture, Nature, 2020, David Behning Galerie, Düsseldorf, Germany
- A Fresh Breeze from The North! Images of Nature in the Helsinki School, 2020, Kunsthalle St. Annen, Lübeck, Germany

2019

- Tree Time, 2019/20, Museo Nazionale della Montagna "Duca degli Abruzzi" CAI Torino, Italy
- Abstractions, 2019, Persons Projects, Berlin
- Power of the Image: The 7th China International Digital Photography Art Exhibition, 2019, Datong Festival, Lishui, China
- Grenzgang Fotokunst: 11. Wiesbadener Fototage 2019, 2019, Wiesbaden, Germany
- An der Nordkante. Der Mensch in der finnischen Gegenwartskunst, 2019, Stadtgalerie Kiel

2018

- Cyclic Repetitions, 2018/19, Gallery Taik Persons (now Persons Projects), Berlin
- Considering Finland, 2018/19, Kunstverein Ludwigshafen, Germany
- On Disappearance and Appearance — The Ephemeral in Photography, Alfred Ehrhardt Stiftung, Berlin, 2018
- Reflections: From Here to There, 2018, Gallery Taik Persons (now Persons Projects), Berlin
- New Territory: Landscape Photography Today, 2018, Denver Art Museum, Denver, USA
- The Log Lady, 2018, Fotografisk Center, Copenhagen, Denmark
- Landscapes the Masters of a Finnish School, 2018, part of Lumières Nordiques, Aabbaye de Jumièges, France

2017

- Vision of Nature, 2017/18, Kunsthaus Wien, Vienna
- The Helsinki School at Landskrona Foto Festival, 2017, Landskrona Museum, Landskrona, Sweden
- Lichtblicke | Zeitgenössische finnische Fotografie, 2017, Kunstverein KunstHaus Potsdam, Germany
- Five Finnish Photographers, 2017, Purdy Hicks Gallery, London
- Marked Sites, 2017, Gallery Taik Persons (now Persons Projects), Berlin

2015

- "I plunge into black holes and emerge intact.", 2015, Gallery Taik Persons (now Persons Projects), Berlin
- Displacement, 2015, Gallery Taik Persons (now Persons Projects), Berlin

2014

- Helsinki School of Photography in Istanbul, 2014, Gallery x-ist Istanbul
- Nine Nameless Mountains, 2014, Monopol Gallery, Warsaw

2013

- New Wave Finland: Contemporary Photography from the Helsinki School, 2013, Scandinavia House, New York
- At the End of the Rainbow - Helsinki School, 2013, Nordic Embassies, Berlin

2012

- NordLichtBilder – Vier junge Positionen der Helsinki School, 2012, Kunstverein Augsburg e.V., Holbeinhaus, Augsburg, Germany
- Helsinki Abstract, 2012, Gallery Nikolaus Ruzicska, Salzburg, Austria

2011

- The Helsinki School - A Female View, 2011/12, FOTO-RAUM, Vienna
- Helsinki School, 2011, Christophe Guye Galerie, Zurich, Switzerland
- The Helsinki School – A Female View, 2011, Purdy Hicks London
- Touching Dreams – Helsinki School Vol. 3, 2011, Det Nationale Fotomuseum, Copenhagen, Denmark

2010

- The Helsinki School at Daegu Photo Biennale: tru(E)motion, 2010, Daegu Culture & Art Center, Bongsan Culture Center, South Korea
- Helsinki10. Contemporary Photography and Video from The Helsinki School in the Statoil Art Collection, 2010, Rogaland Art Museum, Stavanger, Norway
- The Helsinki School – Seven Approaches, 2010, Bryce Wolkowitz Gallery, New York
- Helsinki School - Photography and Video NOW, 2010, Meilahti Art Museum, Helsinki

2009

- Photography Matters: The Helsinki School, 2009/10, Statoil Collection, Oslo, Norway
- Helsinki School – New Art Photography from Finland, 2009, Loft Project ETAGI, St. Petersburg, Russia
- Helsinki School Photography – Internal and External Landscape, 2009, Shiseido Gallery, Tokyo
- On Top of the Iceberg / Auf der Spitze des Eisbergs – Neue Fotografie aus Finnland, 2009, Kunstmuseum Wolfsburg, Germany

2008

- Ecole dʼ Helsinki: dialogue entre 4 générations / Helsinki School: dialogue between 4 generations, 2008, Galerie Baudoin Lebon, Paris
- Rose Boréal - Photographies de l'École d'Helsinki, 2008/09, The Palais des Beaux-Arts of Lille, France
- Helsinki By Night. Fotografie und Videokunst aus Finnland, 2008, Gallery TaiK (now Persons Projects), Berlin
- Rose Boréal - Photographies de l'École d'Helsinki, 2008, École des Beaux-Arts, Paris

2007

- Mapping the Unknown - Fotografie aus Finnland, 2007, Overbeck-Gesellschaft Kunstverein Lübeck, Lübeck, Germany
- New Photography from TaiK, 2007, The Finnish Photography Museum, Helsinki
- Finnische Fotografie, 2007, Ludwig Museum, Koblenz, Germany
- The Helsinki School – Photography by TaiK, 2007, Purdy Hicks Gallery, London
- The Helsinki School of Photography, 2007, Stenersen Museum, Oslo, Norway

2006

- Nordic Cut – The Helsinki School of Photography, 2006, Art Pavilion, Zagreb, Croatia
- Vad är fotografi? The Helsinki School, 2006, Borås Konstmuseum, Borås, Sweden
- Dialog – The Helsinki School, 2006, Langhans Galerie, Prague
- The Helsinki School - Finnish Photography from the 21st Century, 2006, Hôtel de Ville de Bruxelles, Brussels

2005

- The Helsinki School, 2005/06, Photology Gallery, Milan, Italy
- Die Vierte Generation – The Helsinki School, 2005, Art Forum Berlin, Berlin
- The Helsinki School – A New Approach, 2005, Künstlerhaus Bethanien, Berlin
- Die Vierte Generation – The Helsinki School, 2005, PPS Galerie, Hamburg, Germany
- Personligt / Personally - Photographs from The Helsinki School, 2005, Kulturhuset, Stockholm, Sweden
- Finnish Versions - The Helsinki School, 2005, CFF (Centrum för fotografi), Stockholm, Sweden

2004

- 30 by TaiK - The Helsinki School, 2004, The Finnish Museum of Photography, Helsinki
- The Helsinki School, 2004, Brandts Museet for Fotokunst, Odense, Denmark
- The Helsinki School - Photography by TaiK, 2004, Galleri Bo Bjerggaard, Copenhagen, Denmark

2003

- Fünf Positionen Finnischer Fotografie, 2003, Kunstverein Schwerte, Germany
- Fünf Positionen Finnischer Fotografie, 2003, Kunstverein Arnsberg, Germany

2002

- Northern Spell. An Exhibition of Finnish Installation Photography, 2002, University of Toronto Art Centre, Toronto, Canada
- Northern Spell: Contemporary Finnish Photography, 2002, The Embassy of Finland, Washington DC, USA

2001

- Magnetic North, 2001, The New Art Gallery Walsall, United Kingdom
- fotoFINLANDIA!, 2001, Fotografisk Center, Copenhagen, Denmark

2000

- Finnish Photograph, 2000, Museum of Contemporary Art Kiasma, Helsinki

1999

- Tila/Espaces, 1999/2000, Maison Européenne de la Photographie, Paris

1998

- Gallery TaiK. Me, Myself and I: 20 Perspectives Mixed Media, 1998, Bensow House, Helsinki

== Publications ==
The Helsinki School platform sustains a direct link to its former alumni by joining their works with each new generation of graduates through the publication of The Helsinki School books by Hatje Cantz, that is currently in its 6th volume. The first book under the brand name of the Helsinki School was published in 2005.

- The Helsinki School Vol. 1: Photography by TaiK, 2005
- The Helsinki School Vol. 2: New Photography by TaiK, 2007
- The Helsinki School Vol. 3: Young Photography by TaiK, 2009
- The Helsinki School Vol. 4: A Female View, 2011
- The Helsinki School Vol. 5: From the Past to the Future, 2014
- The Helsinki School Vol. 6: The Nature of Being, 2019
