= Susanna Majuri =

Finnish photographer (1978–2020)

Susanna Majuri (24 November 1978 – 5 March 2020) was a Finnish fine art photographer based in Helsinki. A part of the photographic movement The Helsinki School, she was best known for her underwater images.

== Early life and education ==
Majuri graduated from the Turku Art Academy in 2004 and held an M.A. in photography from the University of Art and Design Helsinki (2007).

== Career ==
In her photographs, Majuri captured short narrative scenes as though they were film stills of a story yet to be told. Her main characters, young women mostly, their faces hidden, give a distinct impression of being lost.

Majuri's personal artist statement read:

"My photographs can be seen as different places of emotions. I want to narrate feelings like in novels. I photograph strangers, they invoke my desire, and I ask them to come with me. I conceal my dreams and desires in images. Water paints with me; it merges the people and the landscapes together. Feelings can be revealed, but remain hidden. You can recognize these photographed places in your imagination. Mysteries will become your secrets, and I want to take you into your dreams. Here, in the images, my protagonists sing with tunes of joy and yearning. I borrow the words of the poet Tua Forsström: I said it was a dream, because I wanted to stay."

Majuri is known for taking ethereal and magical photographs, often with water as a key element of the composition. The north is another theme of her photographs both in a physical environment and a mental state. She was in the process of completing her doctoral studies on photographic fiction at the Finnish Academy of Fine Arts in Helsinki.

She had exhibitions in New York, Tokyo, and various places in Europe. She won the Gras Savoye Award at the Rencontres d'Arles festival in France in 2005, and a Finnish State Award for Photography in 2018. She was part of the photographic movement The Helsinki School.

The 2007 Helsinki School book cover photograph is by Majuri. The featured photograph is called Elskar Fyr High Tide (2006) and is part of her series You Nordic. The photo is of a woman in a red coat walking through the water towards a lighthouse in the distance. The You Nordic series consists of women in strange or absurd situations with a repeating color scheme—red against grayish-blue water, pools, or cottages. Each photo is a strange human situation juxtaposed against a bleak natural or environmental backdrop.

Majuri died on 5 March 2020.

== Publications ==
- Sense of Water. Heidelberg, Germany: Kehrer, 2016. ISBN 978-3-86828-722-6. With texts by Monika Fagerholm, Tua Forsström, VigdÍs GrÍmsdóttir, Susanna Majuri.
