= Kare Casals =

Finnish businessman (born 1966)

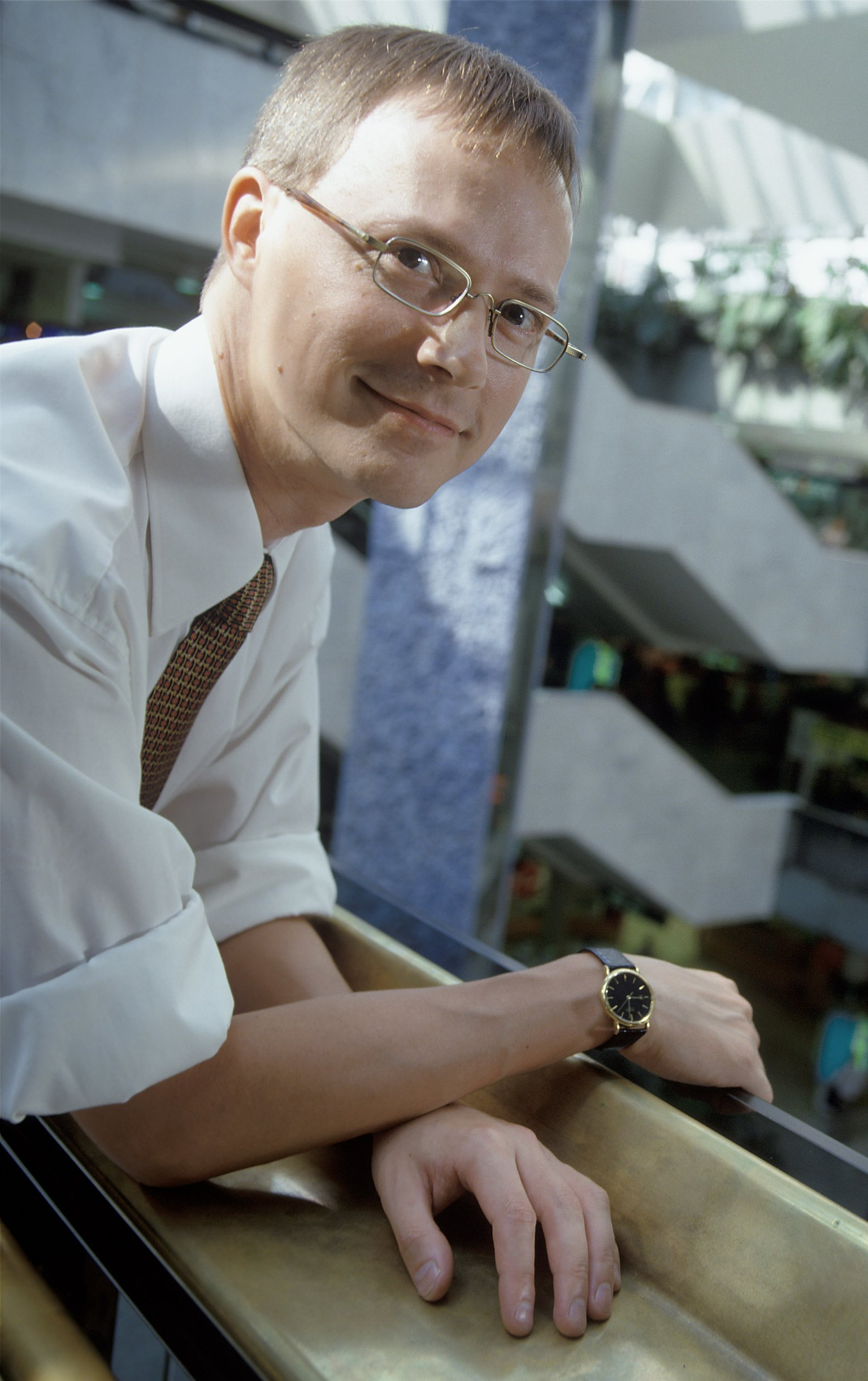
- Casals, Kare (2005)
- Born: December 13, 1966 (age 59); Espoo, Finland
- Occupations: Chairman and former CEO of E-Commerce Association of Finland

Kare Casals (born December 13, 1966, in Espoo, Finland), is a Finnish business developer and a leading figure in E-commerce promotion in Finland. He is better known for his job as former Managing Director & Chairman of the Electronic Commerce Association of Finland and Finnish E-Commerce Service Center.

== Career ==
He has experience in business and trade development since the 1980s. He has also worked as a lecturer and instructor in various universities in the 2000s (decade). He is known to be behind many e-business, related projects and start-ups, and has acted as an advisor to several innovative companies, both in Finland and elsewhere.

Casals has been involved in national and EU-level activities related to e-commerce since 2000. He was Managing Director of the Electronic Commerce Association of Finland from 2002 to 2007, and the Chairman of the association between 2007 - 2011. Casals has also been the co-founder of E-Commerce service center in early 2000.

Between 2008-2010 he has worked as Director of development at Kainuun Etu Ltd., a Finnish municipal owned provincial business development company for the Kainuun region, and also as the Executive director at IT-Pooli Group, a consortium of 22 ICT companies. Now he is working as CEO at Business Meeting Park Ltd.

== Education and family life ==
Casals spent his youth in Barcelona, Spain. He studied Marketing in the Finnish Business College in the 1980s; and Management, Organization Psychology, Marketing, Environmental Management, Economy, Entrepreneurship and SME Business Management at the Helsinki School of Economics (HSE) in the 1990s. He also studied adult education, social psychology, sociology, philosophy and political science at the University of Helsinki in the 1990s, now (since 2008), the University of Vaasa Business School. He also has several professional qualifications and diplomas.

Casals is married and has a daughter.
