= Lauri Kaukonen =

Finnish Secretariate Counsellor and business executive

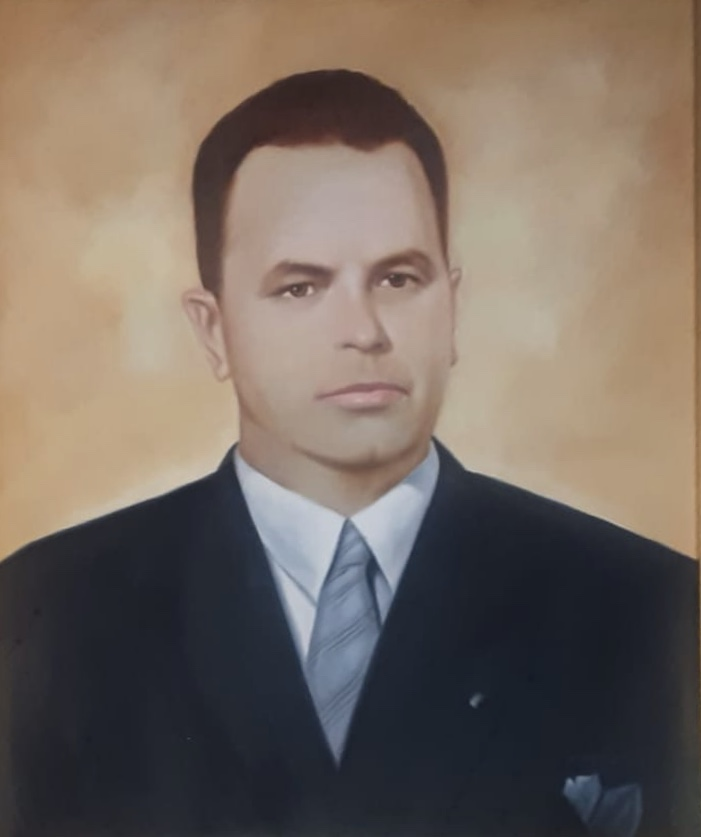
Lauri Kaukonen.

Lauri Kaukonen (March 3, 1902, Rantasalmi, Grand Duchy of Finland - January 8, 1975, Helsinki, Finland) was a Finnish Counsellor of Chancery, board member, business executive, teacher, lecturer, and author.

== Family ==
Lauri Kaukonen was married to Elsa Kaukonen (née Iukkanen).

Kaukonen had five children. His son, Pertti Kaukonen, served as Finland's Ambassador to Kuwait, Bahrain, Qatar, and the United Arab Emirates. Additionally, Kaukonen's grandson is Jukka Aminoff, a Fellow of the Royal Society of Arts (FRSA).

== Career ==
Kaukonen studied at the Helsinki School of Economics. Kaukonen renewed the pension scheme for dairy professionals in Finland. He also enhanced accounting, cost accounting, management, and audit methods among cooperatives. Additionally, he wrote numerous articles on economics, business history, and business computing for Finland's leading newspapers, magazines, and congress publications. Kaukonen delivered lectures at the Helsinki School of Economics and Helsinki Business College, and authored several business books. Kaukonen was also the founder and first chairman of The Pellervo Society's Commercial Club (Pellervon liiketaloudellinen kerho).

== Honours ==
- Finland Order of the White Rose of Finland Knight (1962)
- Finland Counsellor of Chancery (kanslianeuvos) (1967)

In 1962, Kaukonen was granted the title of Knight of the Order of the White Rose of Finland (FWR) by the president of Finland Urho Kekkonen. The FWR decorations are conferred upon citizens who have distinguished themselves in service to Finland.

Kaukonen received the honorary title of Counsellor of Chancery (kanslianeuvos) in recognition of his achievements and dedication to Finland's cooperatives from President Urho Kekkonen in 1967. This title is ranked sixth in Finland's protocol hierarchy and is typically awarded to prominent professors. Staff professors hold the seventh rank.
