= Henrik Lax =

Finnish politician (born 1946)

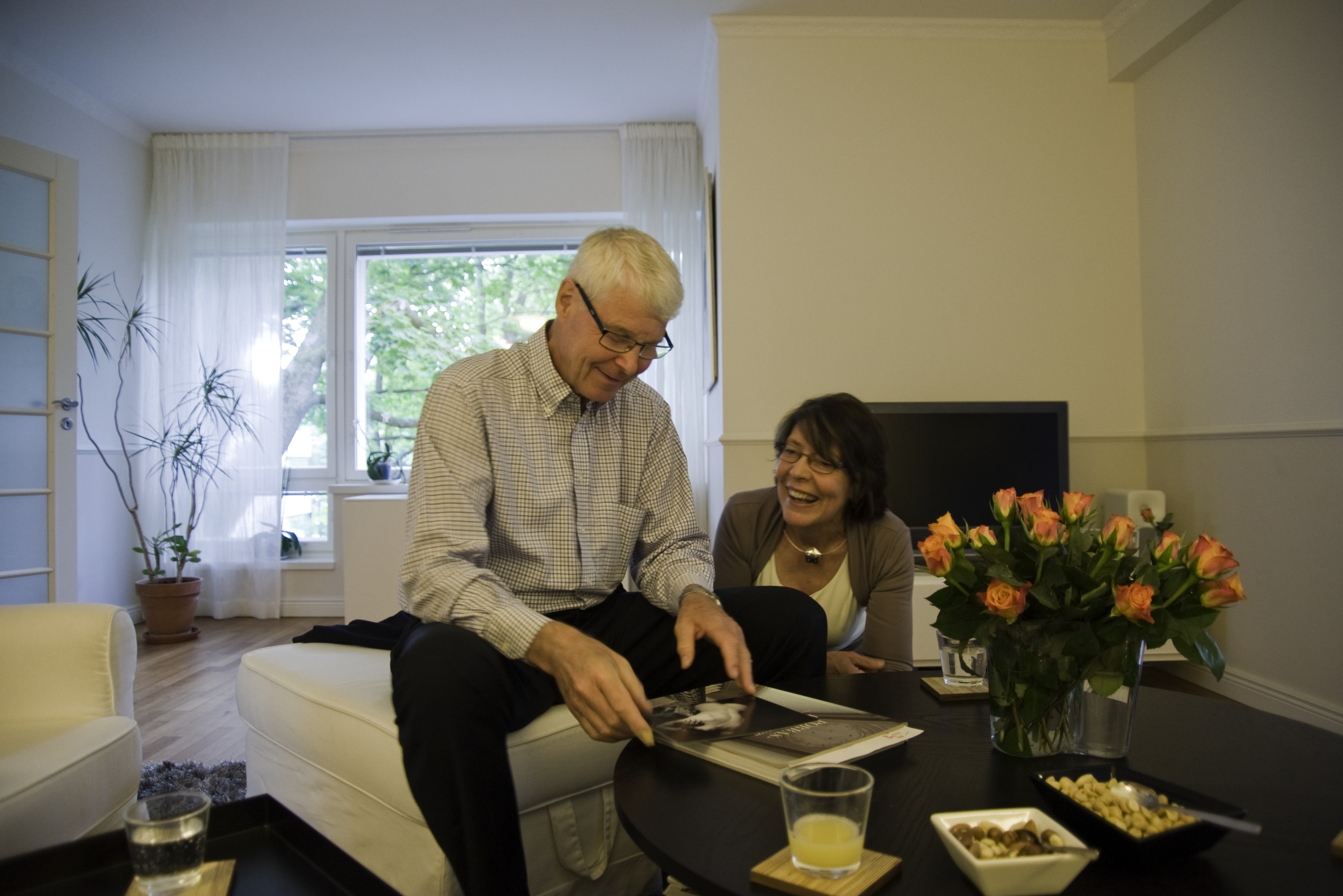
Henrik and his wife Anna-Kristina Lax at their home, 2013

Henrik Lax (born Rolf Henrik Richard Lax on 6 May 1946 in Helsinki) is a Finnish politician and former Member of the European Parliament with the Swedish People's Party, Member of the Bureau of the Alliance of Liberals and Democrats for Europe and sat on the European Parliament's Committee on Civil Liberties, Justice and Home Affairs.

Lax was a substitute for the Committee on the Environment, Public Health and Food Safety, a member of the Delegation to the EU-Russia Parliamentary Cooperation Committee and a substitute for the Delegation to the EU-Moldova Parliamentary Cooperation Committee.

Lax was the Swedish People's Party's candidate in the 2006 presidential election. He finished 7th out of the 8 candidates, with a vote share of 1.6% (48,703 votes). After the first round, he joined the other centre-right candidates in expressing his support for Sauli Niinistö in the runoff election between Niinistö and Tarja Halonen.

Lax has argued that Finland would be better off if it sought membership of the North Atlantic Treaty Organization. He has argued that the time is now, and the option would not be available if the current peaceful situation changed.

== Education ==
- 1967: English and comparative law, City of London College
- 1969: Degree in law from Helsinki University
- 1972: Deputy district judge
- 1973: Degree in economics, Hanken School of Economics in Helsinki
- 1980: Management, Institute of Leadership, Stockholm

== Career ==
- 1969-1971: Research assistant with the national social science commission
- 1969-1972: Court practice, lawyer and prosecution
- 1971-1973: Industry's committee on taxation, legal expert and secretary
- 1973-1987: Oy Tampella Ab
- legal expert, board and management secretary
- head of subsidiary management
- head of textile industry's tarpaulin sector
- assistant director responsible for Group information activities and management training
- since 1988: Governing board of life insurance company Suomi
- since 1995: Governing board of Alko
- Chairman of the Board of Celemi, Finland (learning solutions and projects for change in large corporate organisations)
- 1987-2004: Member of Finnish Parliament for the Swedish People's Party
- 1991-2003: Chairman of Committee on Civil Law
- 1995-2004: Vice-Chairman of the parliamentary group
- 2000-2004: Member of the parliamentary Committee on Foreign Affairs
- Vice-Chairman of the parliamentary Committee on Foreign Affairs (2000, 2002,-2003)
- 2003-2004: Member of the parliamentary Committee on the Constitution
- 2002-2004: Member of the monitoring group on security policy set up by Prime Minister Paavo Lipponen
- 1993-2005: Chairman of the Swedish Assembly of Finland
- Military rank: Captain
- Officer corps, French Legion of Honour
- Knight First Class of the Order of the White Rose of Finland

== See also ==
- 2004 European Parliament election in Finland

== Trivia ==
Lax means salmon in Swedish
