= Timo Santalainen =

Finnish academic and consultant

Timo Juhani Santalainen is a Finnish academic and consultant.

Santalainen's professional career has been a combination of academia, business and consulting. Currently he is President of STRATNET, a Geneva-based network of strategy advisors, and Adjunct Professor of Strategy and International Management at Aalto University School of Business, Lappeenranta University of Technology and Finnish National Defense University. His previous academic positions include professorships at Thunderbird School of Global Management, Texas Tech University and Management Centre Europe. He has held senior executive positions in banking and retailing in Finland, and senior consultant positions at MANNET (Geneva) and S.A.M.I. (Finland).

Santalainen's fields of special interest are Strategic Thinking & Management, International Management, and Organization Transformation. He has been an Advisor and Senior Consultant for numerous business, parastatal and intergovernmental organizations, and guest speaker in conferences and seminars throughout the world. He is the author or co-author of eleven books. His latest book “Escaping Business as Usual: Sustainable Strategizing”, co-authored with R. B. Baliga, was published in 2015. Books on “Results Management”, “Corporate Strategy”, “Strategic Thinking” and “Strategic Thinking & Action” have become best-sellers. He has written articles in international journals such as Business Horizons, The Executive, Global Management, Group & Organizational Studies, Journal of Applied Behavioral Science, Long Range Planning, Organization Studies, and Scandinavian Journal of Management. In addition he has co-authored chapters in several international books.

He is a Founding Member of Strategic Management Society (SMS), and has been Chair of Strategy Practice Interest Group of SMS. He is also a long-time Member of Academy of Management (USA). Previously he has been a Member of the Editorial Review Board of Human Resource Planning, Member of the Executive Advisory Panel of The Executive. He has also been President of Finnish Volleyball Association, President of Promotion Commission of European Volleyball Confederation, and Executive Vice President, Board Member, President of Development Commission and President of World Plan Task Force at Federation Internationale de Volleyball.

Santalainen has been Outstanding Teacher and Outstanding Professor of the Year at Helsinki School of Economics. He was awarded from the Best European Innovation of Bank Marketing, and shared with R. Tainio the 'Douglas McGregor Memorial Award' of best article of the year in Journal of Applied Behavioral Science.

== Biblilography ==
Selected books

- Escaping Business as Usual: Sustainable Strategizing, co-authored with R. B. Baliga, Talentum 2016 (forthcoming).
- Strategic Thinking & Action (in Finnish), Talentum 2009.
- Strategic Thinking (in Finnish), Talentum 2005, Third Edition in 2008. English translation published in 2006.
- Strategic Management in Public Administration (in Finnish), co-authored with Pekka Huttunen, Weilin and Göös 1993, Second Edition in 1995.

Chapters in books

- "Emerging Strategies and Research Management Models: Lessons From the ATLAS Experiment at CERN", co-authored with Ram B. Baliga, in Boisot, Nordberg et al. (eds.),Collisions and Collaborations: Organizational Learning in the ATLAS Experiment at the LHC, Oxford University Press 2011.
- “Dark Side of Leadership: High-Performing Sick Organizations”, co-authored with Ram B. Baliga, in Hooijberg, R., Hunt, J.G., Antonakis, J., Boal, K. and Lane, N. (eds), Being There Even When You Are Not: Leading Through Strategy, Structures, and Systems, Elsevier 2007, pp. 195–215.
- “An Examination of the Dynamics of Transformation of Estonian State-Owned Enterprises toward a Free-Market Orientation”, co-authored with Jaak Leimann and Ram B. Baliga, in Essays in Estonian Transformation Economics, Uhiselu 2003, pp. 49–70.

Articles

- "The Great Promise of Open Strategizing: Searching for Evidence", co-authored with R. B. Baliga, Conference Presentation at 34th Strategic Management Annual Conference, Madrid, September 2014.
- “Open Strategy: Creating More Transparent and Inclusive Strategy Processes at CERN and Intel”, co-authored with Julian Birkinshaw, Markus Nordberg and Richard Whittington, Conference Presentation at 32nd Strategic Management Annual Conference, Prague, October 2012.
- "Big Physics, Small Particles and Bridging Communities: How Does CERN Connect the Macro and Micro Worlds”, co-authored with Sergio Berlusconi and Gabriel Szulanski, Keynote Panel at 30th Strategic Management Society Annual Conference, Rome, September 2010.
- “Global Airline Alliances, Value Propositions, and Strategic Misdirection at Swissair: A Clinical Study”, co-authored with Ram B. Baliga and David Lottenbach, International Journal of Revenue Management, Vol. 2, No 2, 2008, pp. 180–200.
- “Transformation of the State-Owned Enterprises in Estonia and India: An Examination of the Relative Influences of Cultural Variations”, co-authored with Ram B. Baliga, Journal of International Management 12(2006), pp. 140–157.
- “Straddling for Market Space: Transforming Estonian State-Owned Enterprises toward a Free-Market Orientation”, co-authored with Ram B. Baliga and Jaak Leimann, International Business and Economics Research Journal, vol. 2, no 9, September 2003, pp. 75–86.
- “Swissair (A), (B), (C), (D)”, co-authored with Ram B. Baliga, HSE Case 400-201/202/203/204, European Case Clearing House 2003.
