= Sanna Kannisto =

Finnish woman photographer

- Born: 1974 (age 51–52); Hämeenlinna, Finland
- Education: MA, University of Art and Design Helsinki, 2002
- Occupation: Photographer
- Known for: Photographs taken in rainforests and studio photographs of birds

Sanna Kannisto is a Finnish photographer (born 1974) who is noted for her photographs taken in rainforests and for her studio photographs of birds.

== Childhood and education ==
Sanna Kannisto was born in Hämeenlinna, Finland, and has said that her childhood experiences outdoors led to her interest in photographing nature. As a girl, she would collect flowers and insects, pick berries and go fishing during the summers and holidays when her family stayed at a cottage near a forest. But her family was not interested in art, museums or culture, so her first real exposure to imagery came via foreign music magazines and MTV, which arrived in Finland when she was 13. Attending Turku University of Applied Sciences (1994 to 1997) provided Kannisto with an opportunity to travel with scientists to the Amazon rainforests where she began photographing some of the images in her first book, Fieldwork. She received her master's degree in 2002 from the University of Art and Design Helsinki (now the Aalto University School of Arts, Design and Architecture), the noted home of the Helsinki School. Kannisto is one of the second generation of graduates of the Helsinki School, known for advancing the international visibility of Finnish photography, its students and its graduates.

== Photography ==
=== Fieldwork ===
Kannisto made her first visit with scientists to the Amazon rainforest during her photographic studies at Turku University of Applied Sciences. Ultimately, she made eight trips to rainforests and traveled to Brazil, Costa Rica and French Guiana, remaining for two to three months at a time while staying in scientific field stations and photographing near the scientists. Her photographs from that period are collected in her first book, Fieldwork. "Still Lifes", the first of three series in the book, features photographs shot inside a portable studio. Kannisto built the small studio of white Plexiglas that could be lit with small flashlights on the outside and a front wall of netting where the animals could be placed into and released from the studio. Using laboratory stands, clamps and other technical items, she mounted branches to serve as perches for the birds, snakes and other animals that she photographed in the miniature studio. (She worked quickly, and then returned the animals to their original location.) Black drapes that were hung on both sides of the space add a sense of theatricality to the images. The drapes are also a reminder that the photographs are staged to create contemporary art and that the photographs are not intended to be contemporary versions of the 19th-century, natural-history illustrations that they suggest.

"Fieldwork", the second series for which the book was named, collects a variety of documentary-style images shot in the rainforests: photographs of the field stations, close-ups of nectar-sucking bats, daytime and nighttime images of the dense rainforest and its flora, plus self-portraits of Kannisto on site. "Act of Flying", the third series, abandons the scientific, taxonomical titles of the first series and the documentary style of the second series to create a photographic metaphor. The series' nine pages, including two, facing fold-out leaves, present individual, stop-action photographs of a hummingbird captured in flight. Birds have always been metaphors for the human longing for freedom. Here, the suspended motion of hummingbird wings that can flap up to 80 beats per second captures that human longing. Sarah Stacke has written: "Kannisto has been developing a style of image making that lives at the intersection of fine art and science and explores the complicated relationship between humans and nature."

=== Observing Eye ===
Kannisto refined her subject matter out of necessity for Observing Eye. She was planning to photograph in Finland, and, as she has said, there are hundreds of species of snakes and frogs in the rainforest, but only a couple of species of each in Finland. On the other hand, there are almost 500 species of birds in Finland, so Observing Eye has only bird photographs. The book includes a few images of birds perched on branches in the studio like those included in Fieldwork. The simplicity and harmony of the arrangement of branches with their flowers, leaves and berries have been compared to ikebana, the Japanese art of flower arranging. Although Kannisto has said that she selects the branches with care, ultimately the birds are "conspiratorial partners" in a "collaborative" process, as Barbara Hofmann-Johnson has written, because the birds choose their own position when they decide to alight. While Kannisto's photographs are "documentary in style", as she says, they are not straight photography. She shoots additional photographs of the branches after she has released the birds, and sometimes she combines multiple images, alters the focus or otherwise manipulates the image. She ended up shooting the photographs for Observing Eye in Finland, Russia, Italy and South America. Almost all of the photographs in this book like the photographs of animals in her first book are titled taxonomically by their scientific Latin names, such as “Erithacus rubecula” (commonly known as the European robin).

All of the photographs in Observing Eye must have been shot in Kannisto's small, portable studio, but most of the photographs in the book depict only the bird(s) and the branches they are perched on against a pale gray background that functions as a negative space. The context of the studio with its drapes as well as the lab stands and vintage Bunsen burner branch supports have been cropped out of the images. All that remains of contemporary identifiers are the rings attached to each bird's leg. (These small rings of plastic with their individual numbers allow the researchers Kannisto has been working with in the rainforests and in Europe to track the birds' migratory patterns.) Depicting the birds in isolation brings the imagery closer to the scientific and art-historical traditions of illustrations from the 16th century to the present. Yet the series suggests more than illustration. As Sophie Wright says: "[It is] a dance between art and science, information and enigma. The intimate glance exchanged between observed and observer becomes all the more poignant in the context of our current ecological crisis."

== Books ==
- Kannisto, Sanna. Fieldwork. New York: Aperture, 2011. ISBN 978-1-59711-152-2.
- Kannisto, Sanna. Observing Eye. 2nd edn. Berlin: Hatje Cantz, 2021. ISBN 978-3-7757-4791-2.

== Solo exhibitions ==
Exhibition details are drawn from The Helsinki School's Persons Projects.

- 2006: Yours Gallery, Warsaw, Poland
- 2006: Galerie La Ferronnerie, Paris, France
- 2006: Jackson Fine Art, Atlanta, USA
- 2007: Galerie Georg Kargl, Vienna, Austria
- 2008: Korjaamo Culture Factory, Gallery 1 & 2, Helsinki, Finland
- 2008: Galerie Wilma Tolksdorf, Frankfurt am Main, Germany
- 2008: Strange Fascination, Galerie La Ferronnerie, Paris, France
- 2008: Le centre photographique d’Ile-de-France CPIF, together with Ilkka Halso, France
- 2008: Domaine de Kerguéhennec, Contemporary Art Centre, Bignan, France
- 2010: Close Observer, Galerie La Ferronnerie, Paris, France
- 2011: Kalhama & Piippo Contemporary, Helsinki, Finland
- 2011: Fieldwork, Aperture Gallery, New York, USA
- 2011: Fieldwork, Sørlandets Kunstmuseum, SKMU, Kristiansand, Norway
- 2012: Close Observer, Gallery Taik, Berlin, Germany
- 2012: Close Observer, Metronom Gallery, Bologna, Italy
- 2012: Fieldwork, Le Château d’Eau, Toulouse, France
- 2013: Far, Fabbrica Arte Rimini, Galleria d’arte moderna e contemporanea, Rimini, Italy
- 2015: Local Vernacular, Galerie La Ferronnerie, Paris, France
- 2015: Helsinki Contemporary, Helsinki, Finland
- 2017 White Space, Nonostante Marras, part of PhotoVogue Festival, Milan, Italy
- 2018: A Song System, Metronom Gallery, Modena, Italy
- 2018: Wanderer, Observer and Conveyor, Gallery Taik Persons, Berlin, Germany
- 2019: Helsinki Contemporary, Helsinki, Finland
- 2019: Fieldwork, Centro de la Imagen, Lima, Peru
- 2019: Finnish Aalto, Busan Museum of Art, South Korea
- 2019: Observing Eye, Helsinki Contemporary, Helsinki, Finland
- 2020: Sanna Kannisto, Finnish Museum of Photography, Helsinki, Finland
- 2022: Sense of Wonder, Maison Louis Carré, Bazoches-sur-Guyonne, France
- 2022: Research on Wonder, Galerie La Ferronnerie, Paris, France

== Selected awards ==
Award details are drawn from The Helsinki School's Persons Projects.

- 2005 Alfred Kordelin Foundation, Arts Council of Finland, Finnish Cultural Foundation
- 2006: Fine Arts Society of Finland, FRAME
- 2007: Arts Council of Finland, Ministry of Education, Oskar Öflund Foundation, FRAME,
- 2009: Arts Council of Finland
- 2012: Finnish Cultural Foundation Prize
- 2015: Finland State Prize for Photographic Art
- 2017: Finnish Art Society, William Thuring Prize
- 2020: Finnish Cultural Foundation

== Selected collections ==
- Centre Pompidou, Musée National d´Art Moderne, Paris, France
- Fotomuseum Winterthur, Winterthur, Switzerland
- Maison Européenne de la Photographie (MEP), Paris, France
- Museum of Contemporary Art Kiasma, Helsinki, Finland
- Finnish Museum of Photography, Helsinki, Finland
- Le Fonds national d'art contemporain (FNAC), The State Art Collection, Paris, France
- Domaine Départemental de Chamarande, Chamarande, France
- Fondazione Modena Arte Visive, Modena, Italy
- Espoo Museum of Modern Art, Espoo, Finland
