= Veikko Asikainen =

Finnish footballer (1918-2002)

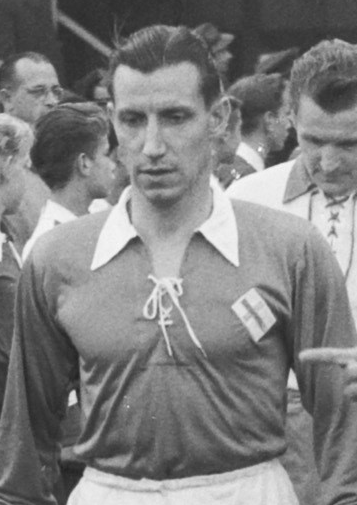
- Veikko Asikainen, October 1951

Personal information
- Date of birth: 18 April 1918
- Date of death: 14 June 2002 (aged 84)
- Position: Midfielder

Senior career*
Years	Team	Apps	(Gls)
1934–1946	TPS Turku		
1946–1957	FC Haka		

International career
1938–1955	Finland	56	
Medal record
Second place	Mestaruussarja	1938
First place	Mestaruussarja	1939
First place	Mestaruussarja	1941
Second place	Mestaruussarja	1944
Second place	Mestaruussarja	1946
First place	Finnish Cup	1955
- * Club domestic league appearances and goals

Veikko Asikainen (18 April 1918 – 14 June 2002) was a Finnish footballer. He earned 56 caps at international level between 1938 and 1955. He was also part of Finland's squad at the 1952 Summer Olympics. At club level Asikainen played for TPS and Haka.

== Honours ==
- Finnish Championship: 1939, 1941
- Finnish Cup: 1955
