= Timo Saarnio =

Timo Saarnio (born 1944) is a Finnish interior architect and furniture designer.

== Early life and education ==
Timo Saarnio was born in 1944 in Helsinki, Finland. He completed training as an Interior Architect, SIO (Institute for Applied Arts, now University of Art and Design Helsinki) in 1971.

== Career ==
Saarnio established his own design firm in 1982. He became a freelance furniture designer in 1992, has taught at the University of Art and Design, Helsinki, and has held elected positions in SIO and ORNAMO, the Finnish Association of Designers.

== Exhibitions ==
- 2004 - Chairmania Exhibition (Tokyo, Helsinki, Tallinn)

== Awards ==
- 1990 State Industrial Design Award
- 1996 Roter Punkt (Red Dot Award), Germany (Una chair)
- 1996 1st prize, Forsnäs 100 Years Competition, Sweden (Duetto chair)
- 1996 Gold Prize, International Furniture Design Competition, Ashikawa, Japan (Woody chair)
- 1997 Three year State artist's grant
- 1998 Chair of the Year, Udine, Italy (Pack chair)
- 1999 SIO Furniture Award at the Habitare fair in Helsinki (Chip chair)
- 2007 7th Andreu World International Design Competition
