= Pedro Aibéo =

Portuguese architect

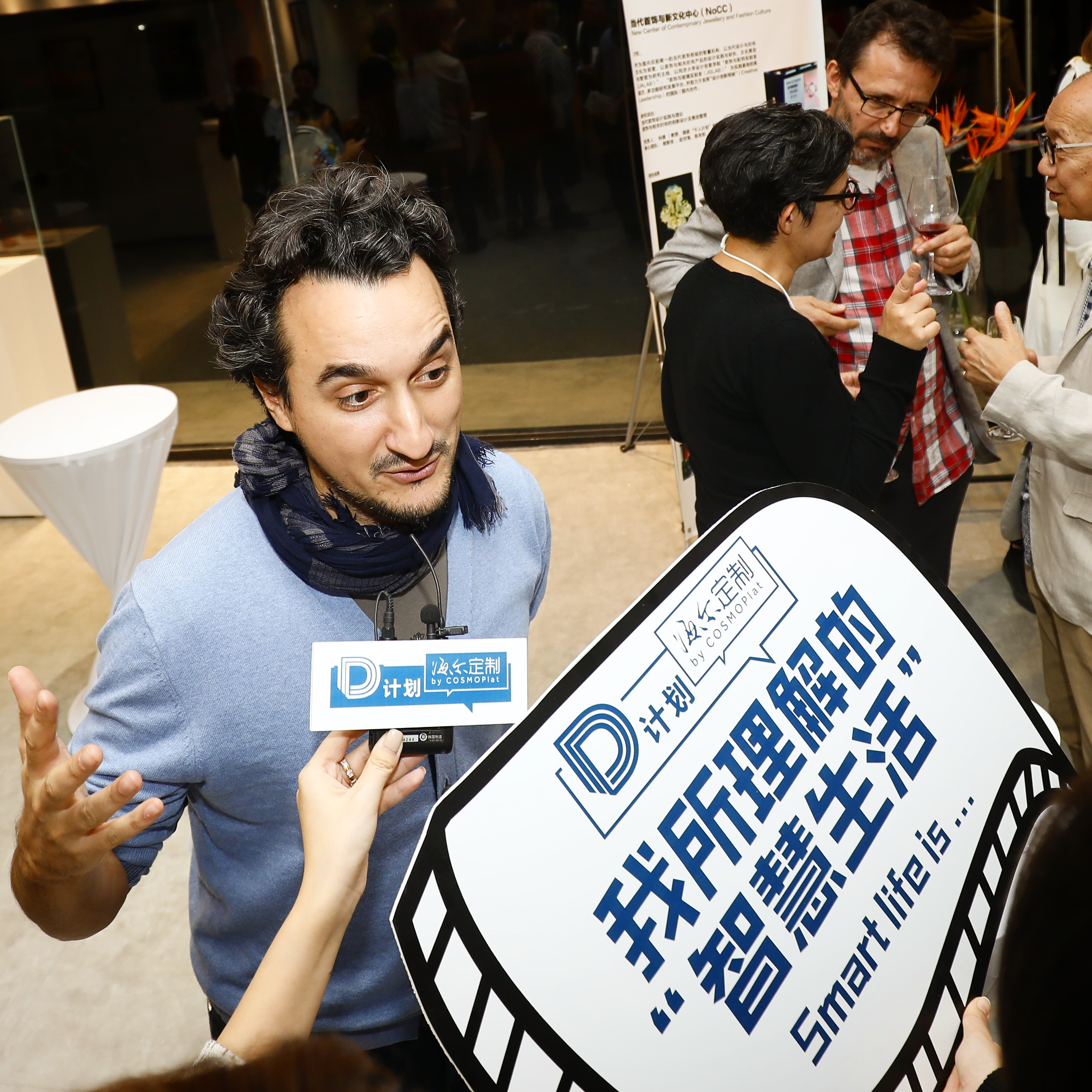
Pedro Aibéo in Shanghai

Pedro Aibéo is a Portuguese-born internationally awarded architect, civil engineer, a researcher in Architectural Democracy, local politician in Finland. He is the founder & CEO of the Gamified Cohousing Oy, founder and Artistic Director of the "Cidadania" theatre+games group, a professional Musician at Homebound, the founder and Chairman of the World Music School Helsinki, a drawing teacher at Croquis Nights and a bestseller Graphic Novelist.

== Career ==
Aibéo graduated in Civil Engineering (MSc) at FEUP, in Porto, Portugal, and then completed a second master's degree, in Architecture, at the TUD, Darmstadt, Germany. His current practice "Gamified Cohousing Oy" focuses mostly on turning abandoned houses in cohousing and corworking economies.

In academic research, he coined the term "Architectural Democracy" during his doctoral studies on the same topic at Aalto University in Finland and at the QUT in Australia, and showcased its core ideas in 2021 at the Venice Biennale of Architecture.

He has been the Kone Säätiö Research Fellow and also a Visiting Associate Professor at UNAM University, Mexico. He teaches regularly at the Wuhan University of Technology, China, Queensland University of Technology, Australia and the Faculty of Architecture, FAUP Portugal and is regularly invited to speak at international conferences.

In theater, he founded in 2007 the "Cidadania" theater+games group, in Germany, and has written and directed several plays at the United Nations Vienna and at the Staatstheater Darmstadt. The topics ranged from urban slavery to astronomy.

In music, he is a professional Musician at the band "Homebound", which counts with distinguished musicians such as Allan MacDonald from the MacDonald Brothers. In 2015, he founded the World Music School which now has schools in three continents.

In drawing, he teaches croquis at the Croquis Nights and at Kiasma and at HAM, The Finnish National Modern Art Museum. He has published a comic novel on mathematics in Portuguese with a preface from Nuno Markl.

In politics, he ran in 2017 as a candidate for the Helsinki Municipal elections and in 2021 in Lohja, Finland as an independent candidate. Despite doing so with the Finnish party The Left Alliance he remained an independent candidate as his political views are of anarcho-syndicalism. For the 2021 elections he went as part of the Meidän Lohja political group and became elected as a Deputy Member of the Urban Planning Department of Lohja.
