= Olli Mannermaa =

Olli Mannermaa (1921–1998) was a Finnish interior architect. He was born in Turku and had two brothers, Pentti and Esko Mannermaa.

== Training ==
- Interior architect, SIO / Institute for Applied Arts (now University of Art and Design Helsinki), Helsinki, Finland 1949

== Exhibitions ==
- 1978 "Muoto-Form" exhibition, Kunsthalle Helsinki
- Entered designs at three Milan Triennales
- Kilta chair (Martela), MoMa, New York, USA (the Kilta chair has also been included in numerous exhibitions around the world)

== Acknowledgments and awards ==
- 1989 Finnish Association of Interior Architects SIO honorary member
- 1985 Central Chamber of Commerce gold medal
- 1979 Knight of the Order of the White Rose
- 1977 State Applied Arts Commission's award
- 1955 Gold medal at the Finnish general fair for the Kilta chair
- 1960-1971 Teacher of construction drawing at the Institute for Applied Arts (now University of Art and Design Helsinki)
