= Rantasalmi =

- Municipality
- Rantasalmen kunta Rantasalmi kommun
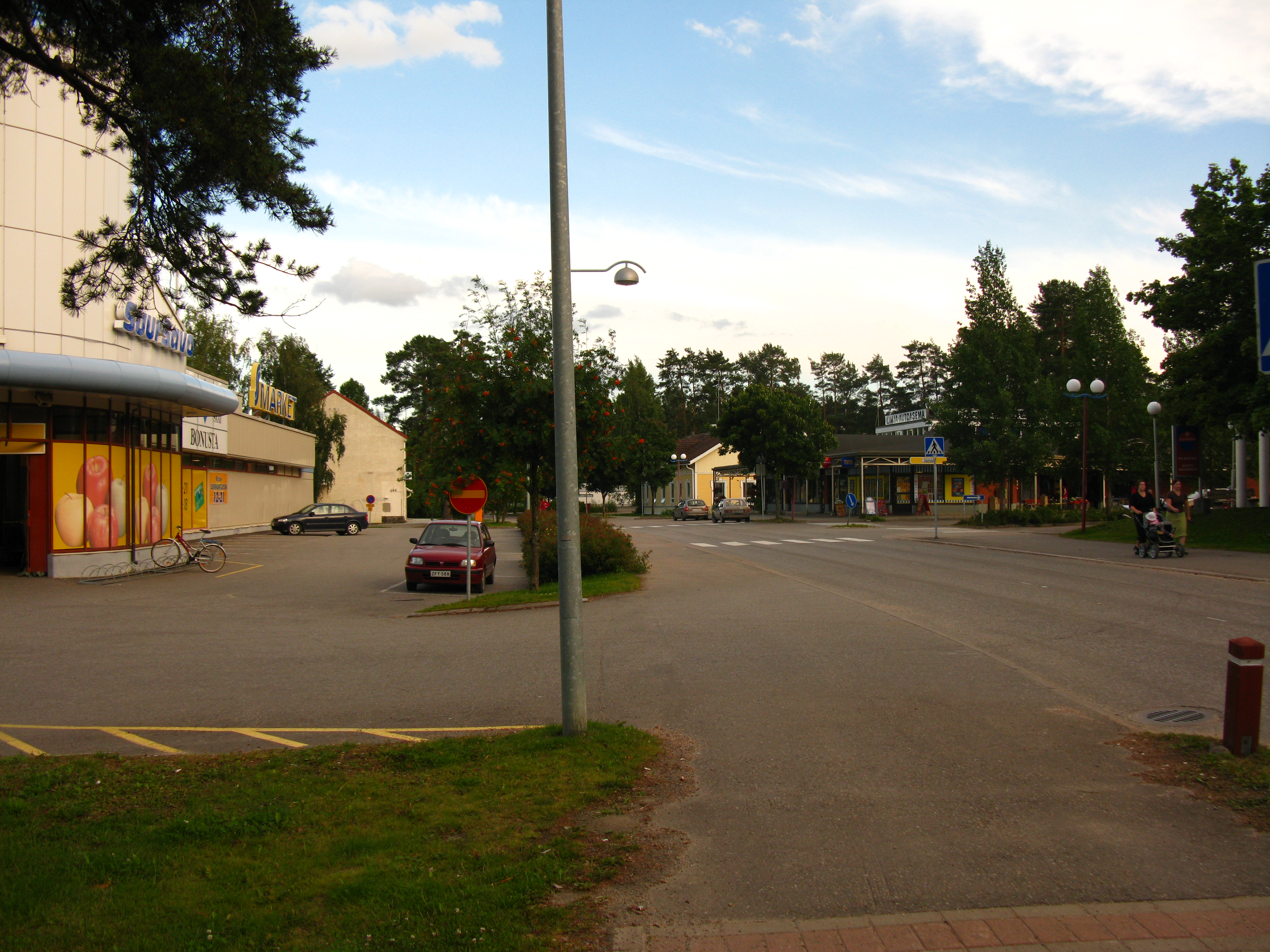
- Rantasalmi centre

- Coat of arms

- Location of Rantasalmi in Finland
- Interactive map of Rantasalmi
- Coordinates: 62°04′N 028°18′E
- Country: Finland
- Region: South Savo
- Sub-region: Savonlinna
- Charter: 1578

Government
  - Municipal manager: Kristiina Järvenpää

Area (2018-01-01)
  - Total: 925.20 km^{2} (357.22 sq mi)
  - Land: 559.53 km^{2} (216.04 sq mi)
  - Water: 366.61 km^{2} (141.55 sq mi)
  - Rank: 153rd largest in Finland

Population (2025-12-31)
  - Total: 3,219
  - Rank: 208th largest in Finland
  - Density: 5.75/km^{2} (14.9/sq mi)

Population by native language
  - Finnish: 93.2% (official)
  - Others: 6.8%

Population by age
  - 0 to 14: 11.4%
  - 15 to 64: 53%
  - 65 or older: 35.6%
- Time zone: UTC+02:00 (EET)
  - Summer (DST): UTC+03:00 (EEST)
- Website: www.rantasalmi.fi

Rantasalmi (Finnish pronunciation: [ˈrɑntɑˌsɑlmi]) is a municipality of Finland. It is located in the South Savo region, 43 kilometres (27 mi) northwest of Savonlinna and 92 kilometres (57 mi) northeast of Mikkeli. The municipality has a population of 3,219 (31 December 2025) and covers an area of 925.20 square kilometres (357.22 sq mi) of which 366.61 km^{2} (141.55 sq mi) is water. The population density is 5.75 inhabitants per square kilometre (14.9/sq mi).

Neighbouring municipalities are Joroinen, Juva, Savonlinna, Sulkava and Varkaus.

The municipality is unilingually Finnish.

== Some villages ==
Asikkala, Osikonmäki, Putkisalo, Rantasalo, Torasalo, Tornioniemi, Tuusmäki and Vaahersalo.

== Notable people ==
- Eliel Saarinen (1873–1950), a Finnish–American architect was born in Rantasalmi.
- Laura Netzel (1839-1927), pianist, composer and conductor
- Jukka Lehtonen (born 1982), volleyball player
- Jarkko Immonen (born 1982), ice hockey player
- Lauri Kaukonen (1902-1975), Secretariate Counsellor
