= Waldemar Wilenius =

Finnish architect

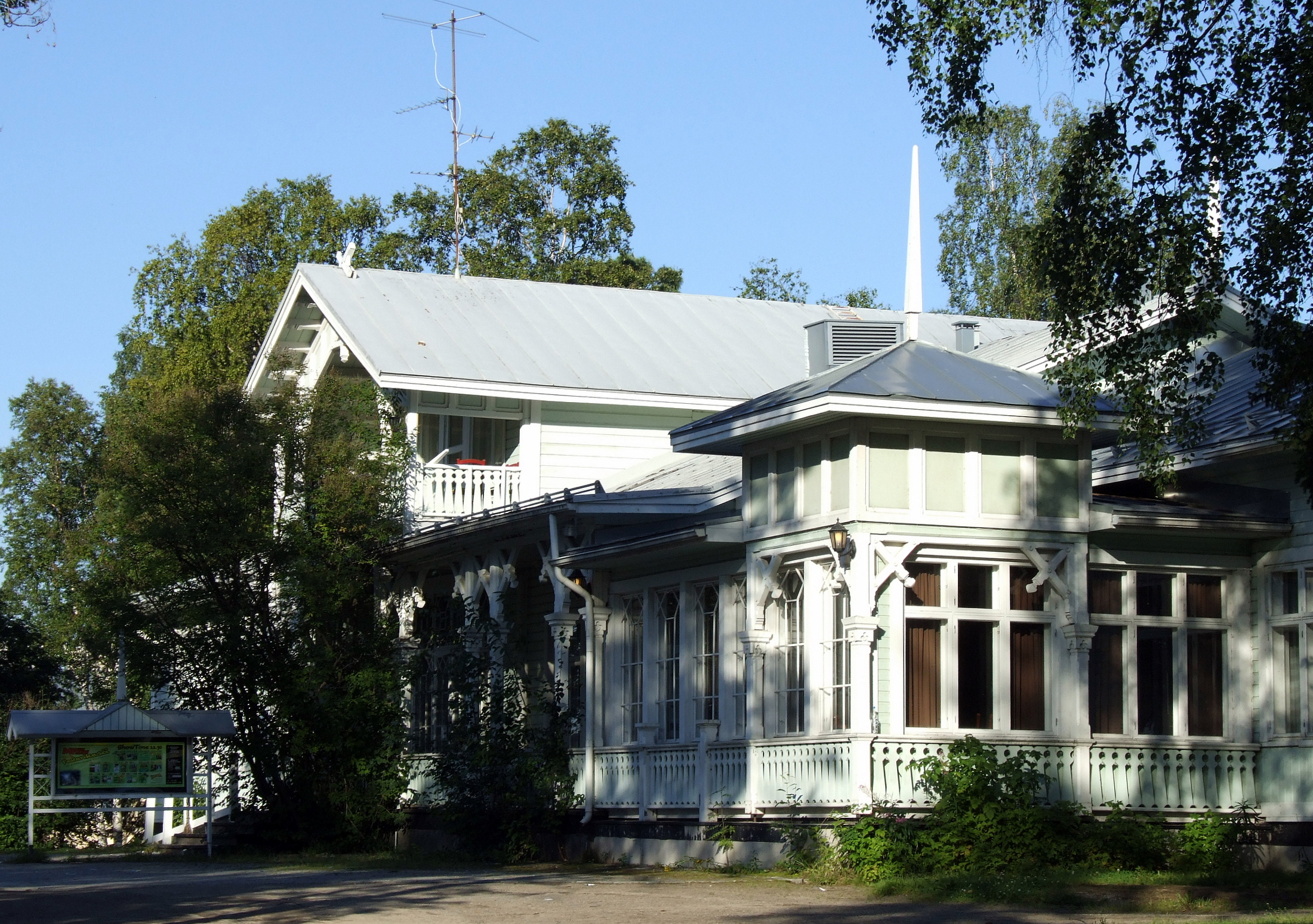
Park Pavilion, Kemi

Waldemar Wilenius (26 October 1868 in Hämeenlinna − 21 September 1940 in Helsinki) was a renowned Finnish architect at the end of the 19th century and beginning of the 20th century designing buildings in first a Neo-Renaissance style before moving to an Art Nouveau style. Wilenius completed his studies at the Finnish Polytechnical Institute in 1889, after which he undertook further studies at the Royal Swedish Academy of Arts in Stockholm and Technische Universität Berlin. After his studies he returned to Helsinki where he worked at the National Board of Building, fulfilling various positions until 1889. He also established his own architect's office. Wilenius is particularly known for a number of apartment blocks built in the centre of Helsinki.

== Buildings by Waldemar Wilenius ==
- Park Pavilion, Kemi – 1893.
- Kontio apartment building, Kruunuvuorenkatu 5/Kauppiaankatu 1–3, Helsinki − 1898.
- Merilinna apartment building, Merikatu 1/Neitsytpolku 2, Helsinki − 1900.
- Gunnebo Gård apartment building, Pietarinkatu 23/Huvilakatu 18, Helsinki − 1905.
