= Jyrki Parantainen =

Finnish photographer

Jyrki Parantainen (born 1962) is a Finnish photographer.

== Life and work ==
Parantainen was born in Tampere, Finland, and lives in Helsinki. He is part of The Helsinki School. Since autumn 2006, Parantainen has been working as a professor for photography at the University of Art and Design Helsinki, where he is responsible for the education of new people within The Helsinki School.

== Style ==
Parantainen is influenced by the Russian film maker Andrei Tarkovsky, whose precise aesthetic is combined with what he himself called “the dirt of the world”. The effect of this influence in Parantainens pictures, are a combination of high aesthetics and gruesome reality. They are a mixture of social realism and socialist surrealism. He doesn’t picture reality but rather puts the manipulation of the photo in the foreground. His works are photographed photographs. He places metal wires, numbers and words upon the first print, to reveal some of the underlying themes of the picture thereby making it obvious to the observer, that these melancholic images are full of lost hopes and disappointments.

Influenced by Anselm Kiefer, Parantainen works with social themes. Violence as a subject is often displayed in his works: violence through physical aggression in the fight for justice and self-assertion, sexual violence or as a means of suppressing people or peoples. In the series “Burning Interiors” he deals with human anxiety. Taking pictures of rooms on fire, he addresses the subject of human vulnerability. Fire erases everything: trails of an individual’s life, his personal story, his memories.

== The artist on his work ==
“On a domestic scale, catastrophes appear everywhere around me; divorce, hate, irritation, as well as anger and a permanent state of misunderstanding to those closest to me. I feel there is an obvious impossibility to find harmony and a sense of well-being in those negative elements surrounding one. All this can simultaneously be seen as happening on a national and universal level. In these images, I try to create a certain amount of irony in order to present some ways of seeking satisfaction, which in my opinion easily appears in bizarre and even tragic acts of behaviour.

== Exhibitions ==
He has been included in many exhibitions such as: “Dreams and Disappointments” at Amos Anderson Art Museum, Helsinki, in 2006. „The 110’th Artist’s Exhibition“ at Taidehalli in Helsinki, 2005. He has also exhibited at museums like: Kulturhuset, Stockholm, Sweden, at The New Art Gallery Walsall, England and the Haus am Waldsee, Berlin, Germany. He was part of the travelling exhibition “Personally – Photographs from The Helsinki School”, 2005, that was shown in NBK; Berlin; Mannheim; Waldkreiburg; Stadtgalerie Kiel; Brandenburgische Kunstsammlung Cottbus – all in Germany.
