= Arto Lahti =

Arto Henrikki Lahti (born 3 May 1949 in Merikarvia, Finland) is a professor of entrepreneurship at the Helsinki School of Economics.

He was an independent nominee for the Finnish presidential election in 2006, with themes including preserving the status of small enterprises, rights of overleveraged, political honesty and returning of Karelia. Of the eight candidates in the 2006 election, Arto Lahti was the last who entered as a candidate. This is mostly because he was the only candidate not affiliated with any party, so he had to gather 20,000 supporter cards to be qualified.

Lahti finished last out of the eight candidates in the first round of the election on January 15, getting a vote share of 0.4% (12,989 votes). Following the first round, he endorsed the National Coalition Party's candidate Sauli Niinistö in the runoff election between Niinistö and incumbent Tarja Halonen on January 29.
