= Art (magazine) =

German magazine (established 1979)

- Editor: Tim Sommer
- Categories: Art journal
- Frequency: Monthly
- Circulation: 43,400
- Publisher: Gruner + Jahr
- Founded: 1979
- Country: Germany
- Based in: Hamburg
- Language: German
- Website: art-magazin.de
- ISSN: 0173-2781

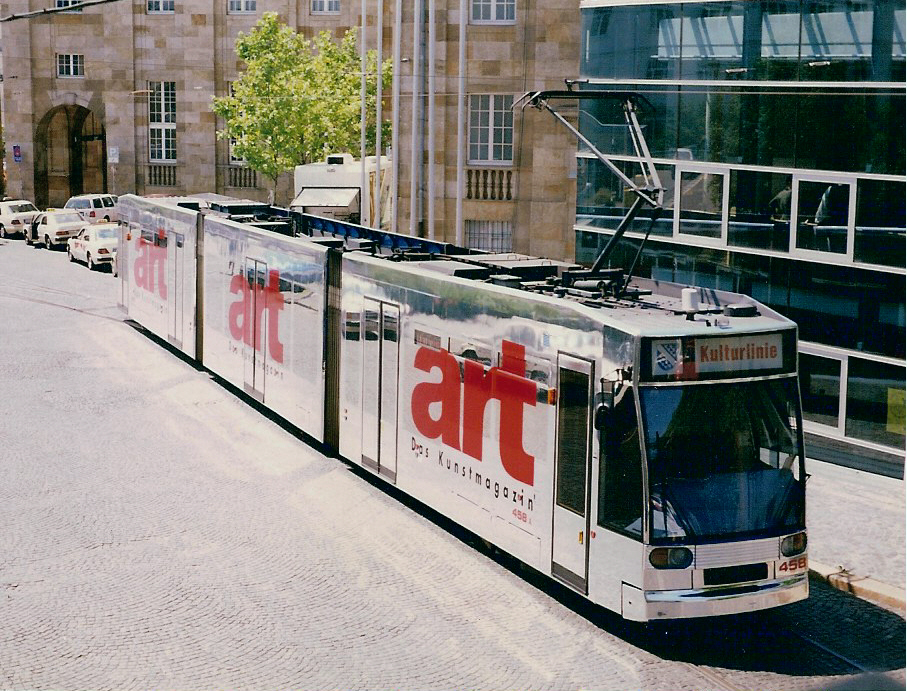
A Kassel tram advertises the magazine

Art – Das Kunstmagazin is a monthly art magazine founded by Wolf Uecker and first published by Gruner + Jahr in 1979. Its original editor-in-chief, Axel Hecht, was replaced by Tim Sommer in 2005. The magazine features both new and established contemporary artists across all disciplines (including painting, sculpture, design, and video art) as well as reports on exhibitions and projects.

In 2001, Art assimilated the Swiss monthly art magazine Artis – Zeitschrift für neue Kunst (ISSN 0004-3842), which had been published by Hallwag, Bern and Stuttgart-Ostfildern since 1950.
