= Antti Räisänen =

Finnish scientist

Antti V. Räisänen
- Born: September 3, 1950 (age 75); Pielavesi, Finland
- Education: Helsinki University of Technology

Antti V. Räisänen (born 3 September 1950, in Pielavesi), is a Finnish scientist. He is the professor and head of the Department of Radio Science and Engineering in Aalto University (former Helsinki University of Technology). He is also the director of SMARAD (The Center of Smart Radios and Wireless Research).

Räisänen received the Doctor of Science (Tech.) degree in electrical engineering from the Helsinki University of Technology (TKK), Finland, in 1981. Räisänen was appointed to the professor chair of Radio Engineering at TKK in 1989, after holding the same position in 1985 and 1987–1989. He has held visiting scientist and professor positions at the Five College Radio Astronomy Observatory (FCRAO) and University of Massachusetts Amherst (UMass), Amherst (1978–1981), at Chalmers University of Technology, Göteborg, Sweden (1983), at the Dept. of Physics, UC Berkeley (1984–1985), at JPL Caltech, Pasadena (1992–1993), and at Paris Observatory and University of Paris VI (2001–2002).

Räisänen is supervising research in millimeter-wave components, antennas, receivers, microwave measurements, etc. at TKK Dept. of Radio Science and Engineering and MilliLab (Millimetre Wave Laboratory of Finland - ESA External Laboratory). He has authored and co-authored more than 400 scientific or technical papers and six books, for instance, "Radio Engineering for Wireless Communication and Sensor Applications". Also he is involved in some courses related to those field in European School of Antennas.

Räisänen has been Conference Chairmen for several international microwave and millimeter wave conferences including the European Microwave Conference (EuMC) in 1992. In 1997, he was elected the Vice-Rector of TKK for the period of 1997–2000. He served as an associate editor of the IEEE Transactions on Microwave Theory and Techniques from 2002 o 2005. He is a member of the board of directors of the European Microwave Association (EuMA) for 2006–2008 and 2009–2011. He is a Fellow of the IEEE since 1994 for contribution to and leadership in millimeter-wave receiver technology.

In 2009, Räisänen has been awarded the Distinguished Achievement Award by AMTA (which is AMTA's most prestigious award) for his outstanding and pioneering contributions to the Theory, Practice and Art of Hologram-based Compact Antenna Test Ranges at Submillimeter Wavelengths.
