= Kari Asikainen =

Finnish interior designer

Kari Aaro Juhani Asikainen (born 24 October 1939 in Parkano, Finland) is a Finnish interior designer and former professor of Industrial Furniture Design at MUOVA, the Design Centre of Western Finland in Vaasa, 1988–1994. He also taught at University of Art and Design Helsinki (known in Finnish as TAIK) in 1973–1988.

Asikainen studied at the Institute for Applied Arts (forerunner to TAIK), completing his studies in 1966. His best-known design is for the Kari series of chairs started in 1969, for which he was awarded the SIO (Finnish Association of Interior Architects) 1982 award for best piece of furniture for a public space. In 1984, he won the prestigious State Applied Arts Commission's Award.

== Exhibitions ==
Asikainen's work has been exhibited at the “Through life from children to elderly” (2002), Ozone Living Design Center, Tokyo, Japan; “La vita per le sedie” (1999), Bari, Italy; “Kuusikymppisen kolmikymppinen” (Thirty of a sixty) retrospective, Design Museum, Helsinki; “Kari 20 years” furniture exhibition (1989), Design Forum, Helsinki; “Furniture and textiles” joint exhibition (1987) with Katariina Metsovaara, Kluuvi Gallery, Helsinki.
