= Agrarian parties of Finland =

Agrarian parties of Finland were and their successors are a typical part of the development in the Nordic countries, which has been based on milk production in distant and relatively sparsely populated areas. The state support for small peasants was one of the essential economic reforms in the newly independent Finland just after the declaration of independence in 1917 and fierce civil war of 1918. Already in 1917 the land reform, which had been discussed for more than ten years seriously in the parliament was executed. The tendency toward increasing small farming continued in various other reforms like Lex Kallio, which made it possible for the small peasants to achieve more lands. This made parliamentary life fragile in Finland as the reforms created mistrust between the Agrarian League lea mainly by Kyösti Kallio and the National Coalition party (National Coalition since 1951), which favoured bigger land-owners. Between the world wars strong agrarian movements were not only in the Nordic countries, but also in Bulgaria.

Historically farmers' party, a declining farmer population after the Second World War made them broaden their scope to other issues and sections of society. At this time, they renamed themselves, three of them to Centre Party, with the Finnish Centre Party being the last to do so, in 1965. Now, the main agrarian parties are the Centre Party in Sweden, Venstre in Denmark, Centre Party in Finland, Centre Party in Norway and Progressive Party in Iceland. A similar strain of parties has emerged in the Baltic countries.

Only in Finland there are two strong Agrarian party successors left based on Agrarian League (Finland), the Centre Party of Finland and the split of Agrarian League (Finland), the True Finns.

== History ==
Compared to continental Europe, the peasants in the Nordic countries historically had an unparalleled degree of political influence, being not only independent but also represented as the fourth estate in the national diets, like in the Swedish Riksdag of the Estates. The agrarian movement thus precedes the labour movement by centuries in Sweden, Denmark, Finland and Norway.

The first of the parties, Venstre in Denmark, was formed as a liberal, anti-tax farmers' party in 1870. The rest of the parties emerged in the early 20th century, spurred by the introduction of universal suffrage and proportional representation across the region. Finland's Centre Party was the first to be created in 1906, followed by the Centre Party in Norway in 1915. Sweden's Centre Party, founded in 1921, emerged from the existing Lantmanna Party, and its splinter groups.

| Finland | In English | Year | Place | Founder(s) | Parliament | Development | Background |
| Suomen Maalaisväestön Liitto | League of the Rural People of Finland | 1906–1908 | Oulu | chairman Otto Karhi | | Agrarian League; 1908; Centre Party; 1965; Centre Party in Finland; 1988 | Finnish Party |
| Etelä-Pohjanmaan Nuorsuomalainen Maalaisliitto | Young Finnish Agrarian League of the Southern Ostrobothnia | 1906–1908 | Laihia | Santeri Alkio (-1898 Aleksander Filander) | | | Young Finnish Party |
| Kansanpuolue | People's Party | 1917–1918 | | Taavetti Heimonen; Erkki Pulliainen; Kaarlo Vuokoski; Jussi Puumala; August Tanttu | | first National Progressive Party; 1918 then Agrarian League; National Coalition Party; 1918 | Young Finnish Party; Finnish Party |
| Suomen Pienviljelijöiden Puolue | Small Farmers' Party of Finland | 1929–1936 | | chairman Eino Yliruusi | | | Agrarian League |
| Kansanpuolue | People's Party | 1932–1936 | Ylivieska | | | | Recession movement of Kalajoki valley Horse mutiny of Nivala; 1932; Agrarian League |
| Pienviljelijäin ja Maalaiskansan Puolue, myöhemmin Suomen Pienviljelijäin Puolue | Party of Smallholders and Rural People, later Small Farmers' Party of Finland | 1936–1954 | Seinäjoki | | | Both the MPs to the Agrarian League; 1941 | merger of People's Party and Small Farmers' Party of Finland |
| Pienviljelijäin ja Maalaiskansan Puolue, myöhemmin Suomen Pienviljelijäin Puolue | Small Peasants' Party of Finland; 1959-1966; The Rural Party of Finland; 1966-2003 | 1959- 1995 (de facto)/ 2003 (de jure) | | chairpersons Veikko Vennamo; 1959; Pekka Vennamo; 1979; Heikki Riihijärvi; 1989; Tina Mäkelä; 1991; Raimo Vistbacka 1992-1995 | | split Party of the Unity of the Finnish People; 1972 bankruptcy dissolution 2003 | Disputes in Agrarian League between Veikko Vennamo and Vieno Johannes Sukselainen rural critique against the urbanisation and passive attitudes of Agrarian League |
| Suomen Kansan Yhtenäisyyden Puolue, myöhemmin Kansalaisvallan Liitto | Party of the Unity of the Finnish People; 1972-1982; The League of the Citizens' Power; 1982-1983 | 1959–1983 | | chairmen Eino Haikala; 1977; Anssi Keski-Vähälä; 1979 | | The only 1975 elected MP, Matti Asunmaa joined the Centre party in 1977 | Disputes between Urho Kekkonen and Veikko Vennamo concerning Kekkonen's the re-election as the president of Finland without normal presidential election for the years 1974-1980 and opposing the special law to avoid elections and make possible an extra term for the years 1974-1978 to avoid heated political debate because of CSCE. |
| Vapaan Suomen Liitto; 1994-2004; Itsenäisyyspuolue; Vapaan Suomen Liitto; 2004-2006; Itsenäisyyspuolue 2006 | League of the Free Finland; 1994-2004; Independence Party the League of the Free Finland; 2004-2006; Independence Party; 2006 | 1994 | | chairmen Ilkka Hakalehto; 1994-2004; Antti Pesonen; 2004 | | | Disputes between Keijo Korhonen's supporters for the president of Finland in the presidential elections not accepting the idea, that the Centre Party would accept the negotiations of the EU membership for Finland and the supporters of the negotiations and the presidential elections candidate Paavo Väyrynen, who resigned from the post of the minister for foreign affairs of Finland during the negotiations starting oppose the EU membership as he considered the conditions granted by the EU too un favourable for Finland. The Independence Party criticizes more the Portugal and Greece bailout of the EMU crises than Sauli Niinistö or Jyrki Katainen has done. The party wants Finland to achieve the same EES status as the EFTA countries Iceland, Norway, Liechtenstein has and which Finland had before joining the EU in 1995. |
| Perussuomalaiset | True Finns | 1995 | | chairmen Timo Soini; 1995 | | The party established after the bankruptcy of The Rural Party of Finland in sauna in Kalmari of Saarijärvi by the idea four remaining officials of the foregone party: Timo Soini, Raimo Vistbacka and two others. The collecting of 5 000 supporters' underwritings started with remained 300 or 400 supporters of the party. | Disputes between the supporters of the Rural Party of Finland, traditional supporters of the Centre Party in Finland just like the supporters of Independence Party against the centric liberals within the Centre Party in Finland favouring or accepting like the eurocentric Social Democrates and liberal Coalition party supporters the deepening Western integration on the basis of the Lisbon Treauty and EMU stabilisation mechanism. Timo Soini accepts the NATO membership as the party majority does not due to the worry, that international activities outside the NATO charter would ruin the large land forces of the reserve army making non-alliance impossible. |

== Ideology ==
In the 1930s spontaneous Agrarian movements were based on the critique against the cabinets, where also the Agrarian League was presented. In the 1930s there were after Kyösti Kallio's third cabinet, Pehr Evind Svinhufvud's second cabinet and Juho Sunila's second cabinet, which were majority cabinets, Kivimäki's minority cabinet, which was based on the small National Progressive Party backed by it, Swedish People's Party and Agrarian League. There were also non-partisan ministers. The Agrarians thought that Agrarian League does not do enough for the country side during the economic recession.

The second split happened in the late 1950s as Finland started to industrialise strongly setting the national target, the Swedish model. A member of the Agrarian league, Veikko Vennamo, established the Small Peasants' Party of Finland in 1959, which got three substantial victories in 1970, also in 1972 and 1983. After 1970 elections, the chairman of the Centre Party (Agrarian League 1908-1965) Johannes Virolainen declared, that the Center Party has to come back to aitovierille (the country field fence sides) and thus take seriously the agricultural matters and country side. This led to the hardened national agricultural policies and regional policies which made escape from the country side to cities and Sweden to work slower. The Centre Party succeeded in 1972 destroying the strong mandate of The Rural Party of Finland by promoting the possibility to take the party state subsidies to a new party, the |Party of the Unity of the Finnish People.

As had changed its name in 1965, from Agrarian League to the Center Party under Johannes Virolainen's chairmanship, the Small Peasants' Party of Finland changed its name the next year to The Rural Party of Finland as if it had taken the place in the politics from Agrarian League to defend agriculture and the countryside. The organisations of The Rural Party of Finland bankrupted. In 1995 the members of The Rural Party of Finland established the True Finns. The main argument has been to promote confederalist thinking and preserving the national state as a vehicle to fulfill national democracy, which has led into the eurosceptical thinking as far as it concerns the EMU bailouts.

== Sources ==
- Arter, David (1999). Scandinavian politics today. Manchester: Manchester University Press. ISBN 978-0-7190-5133-3.
- Esaiasson, Peter; Heidar, Knut (1999). Beyond Westminster and Congress: the Nordic experience. Columbus: Ohio State University Press. ISBN 978-0-8142-0839-7.
- Hilson, Mary (2008). The Nordic model. Ann Arbor: University of Michigan Press. ISBN 978-1-86189-366-6.
- Arter, David (2001). From Farmyard to City Square?: the Electoral Adaptation of the Nordic Agrarian Parties. Ann Arbor: University of Michigan Press. ISBN 978-0-7546-2084-6.
- Cotta, Maurizio; Best, Heinrich (2007). Democratic Representation in Europe. Oxford: Oxford University Press. ISBN 978-0-19-923420-2.
- Siaroff, Alan (2000). Comparative European party systems: an analysis of parliamentary elections. London: Taylor & Francis. ISBN 978-0-8153-2930-5.
