= 1994 Finnish presidential election =

← 1988	16 January 1994 (first round); 6 February 1994 (second round)	2000 →
- Turnout: 78.43% (first round); 78.68% (second round)
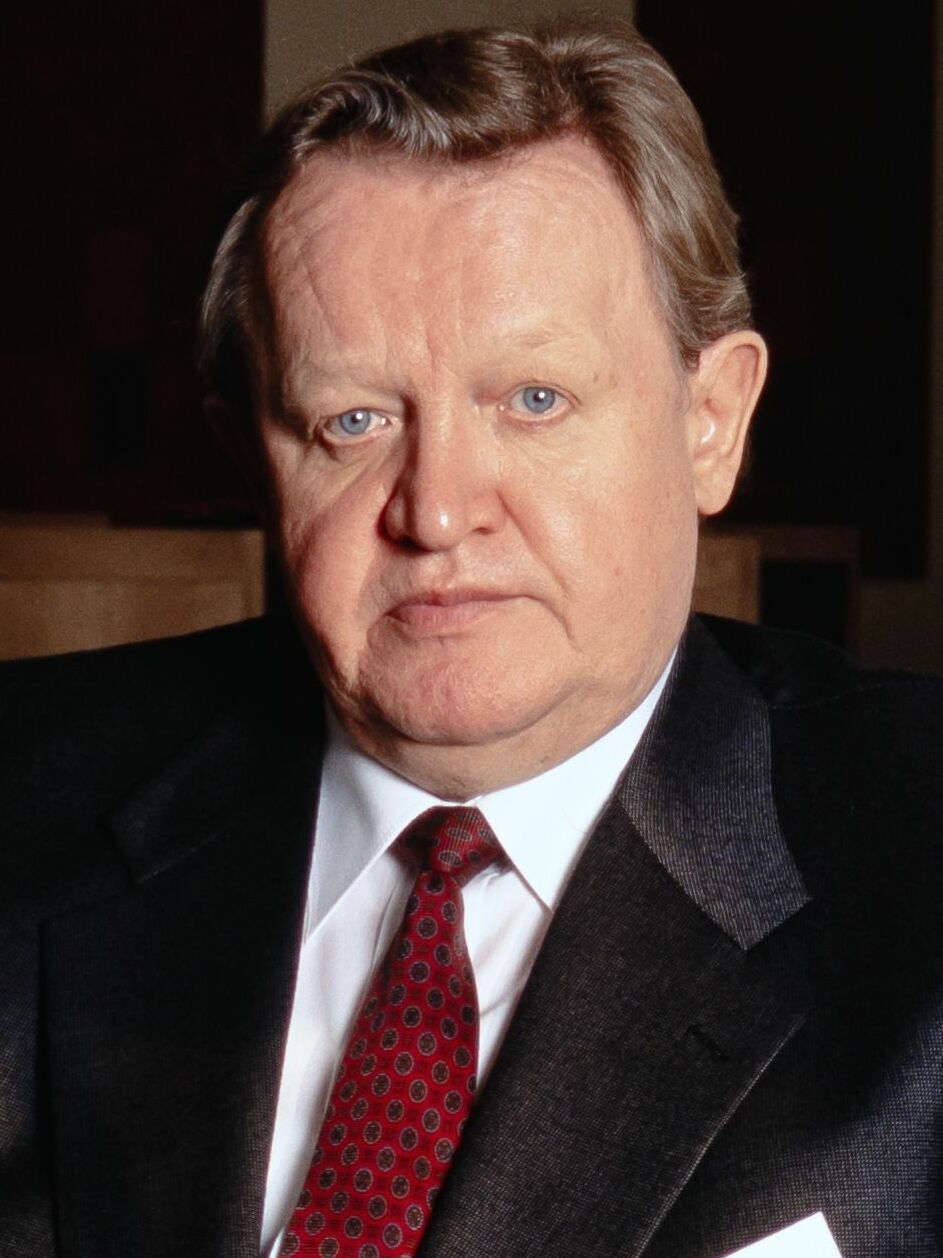

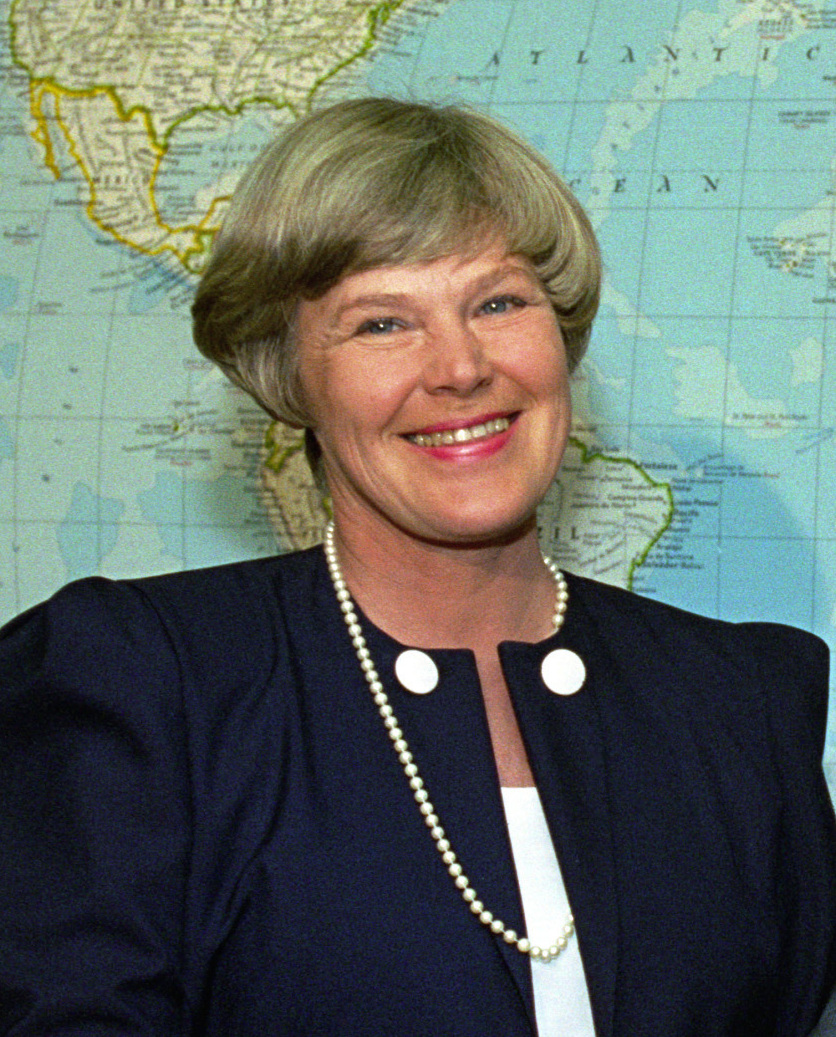
Candidate	Martti Ahtisaari	Elisabeth Rehn
Party	SDP	RKP
Popular vote	1,723,485	1,476,294
Percentage	53.86%	46.14%
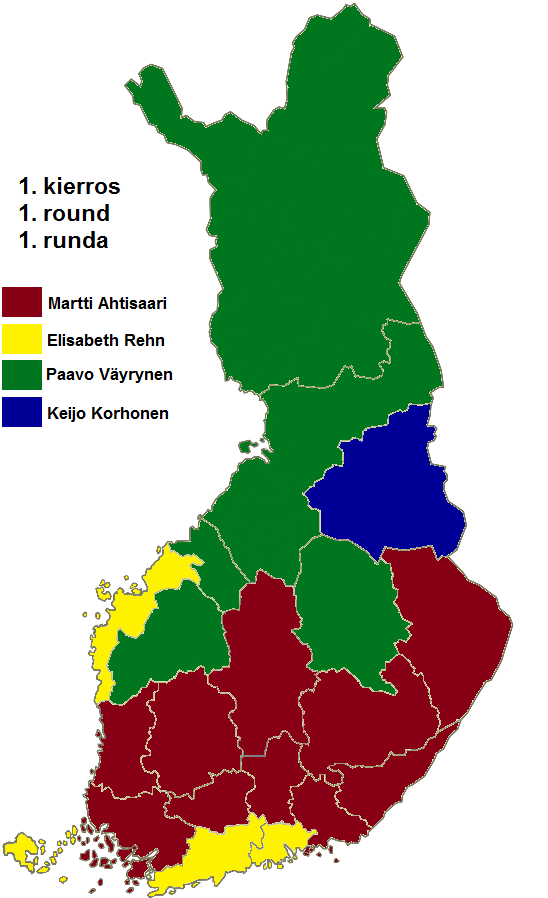
- Martti Ahtisaari Elisabeth Rehn Paavo Väyrynen Keijo Korhonen Martti Ahtisaari Elisabeth Rehn
President before election
Mauno Koivisto
SDP
Elected President
Martti Ahtisaari
SDP

Presidential elections were held in Finland on 16 January 1994, with a second round on 6 February. It was the first time the President had been solely and directly elected by a popular vote. Martti Ahtisaari defeated Elisabeth Rehn in the second round.

Voter turnout was 78.4% in the first round and 78.7% in the second. This was an open presidential election, because the two-term Finnish President, Mauno Koivisto, had refused to seek a third term. His popularity had also clearly declined since Finland entered into a deep economic recession in 1991.

Martti Ahtisaari, a former primary school teacher and a long-time United Nations diplomat, emerged as the frontrunner after winning the Social Democratic presidential primary in the spring of 1993. Having lived abroad for many years during his diplomatic career, he was at first largely unknown to most Finnish voters. On the other hand, he appeared not to be tainted with political scandals or allegations of opportunism, contrary to some of his opponents, especially the Centre Party presidential candidate, Paavo Väyrynen. This was also the first Finnish presidential election to include a popular female candidate. Elisabeth Rehn, the small Swedish People's Party's presidential candidate, appealed to voters through her reputation as a diligent, caring and sincere woman. She was serving as Defence Minister during the election.

Rehn's popularity rose dramatically in early January 1994, helping her defeat her two major bourgeois rivals, Väyrynen and the National Coalition candidate, Raimo Ilaskivi. Väyrynen bitterly blamed the media for scheming to make his support appear to be falling just before the first round of voting. Some Finns voted tactically for Rehn on the first round to eliminate Väyrynen from the second round. Ahtisaari and Rehn agreed on many issues, such as Finland's intention to become a member of the European Union. They disagreed partly on economic issues, with Ahtisaari favouring more economic stimulation and Rehn viewing increased economic stimulus sceptically. The three-week period between the first and second rounds of voting saw Ahtisaari's support rise significantly, and during the final week of campaigning opinion polls showed him leading Rehn.

== Candidates ==
Gallery of announced candidates

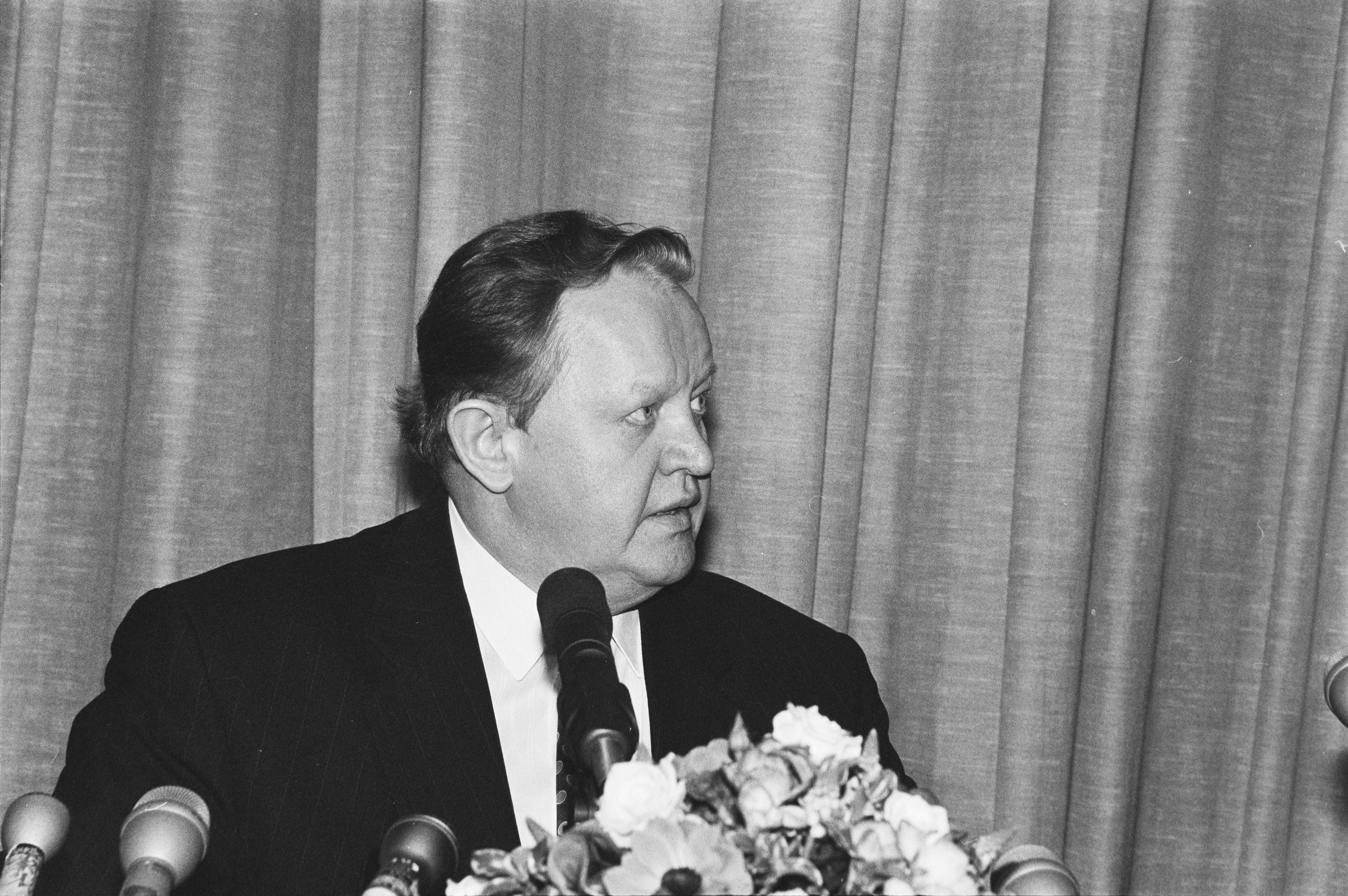
Martti Ahtisaari

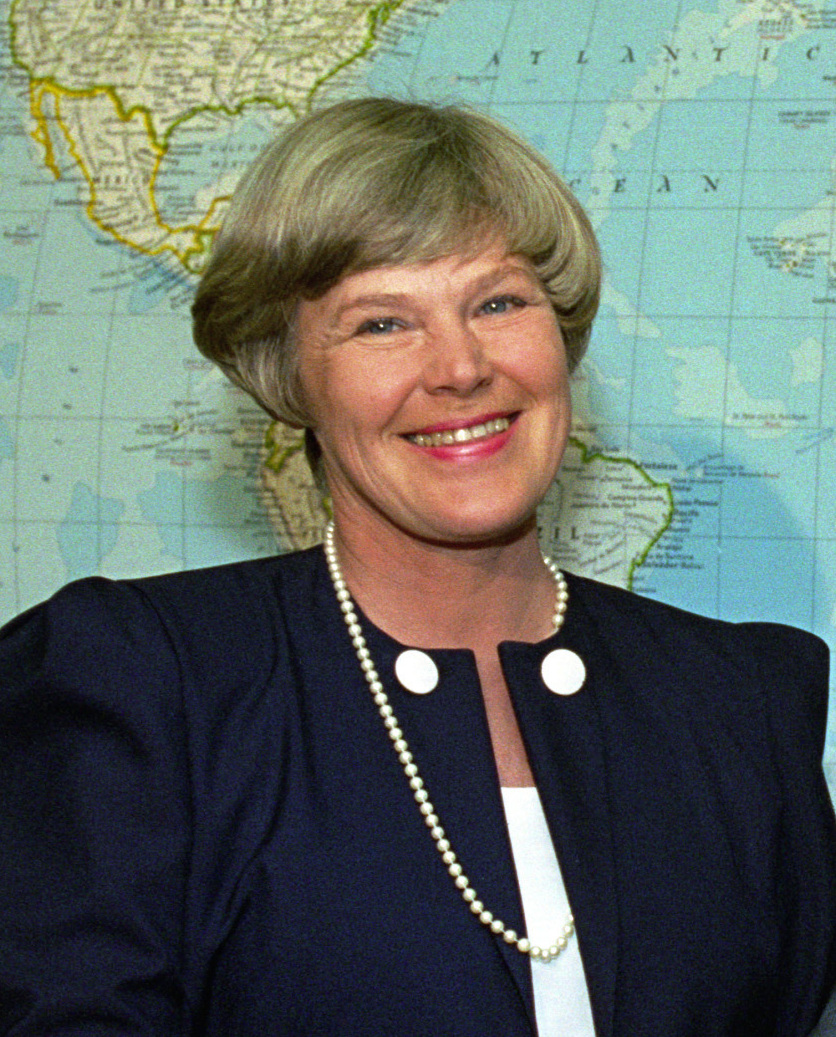
Elisabeth Rehn

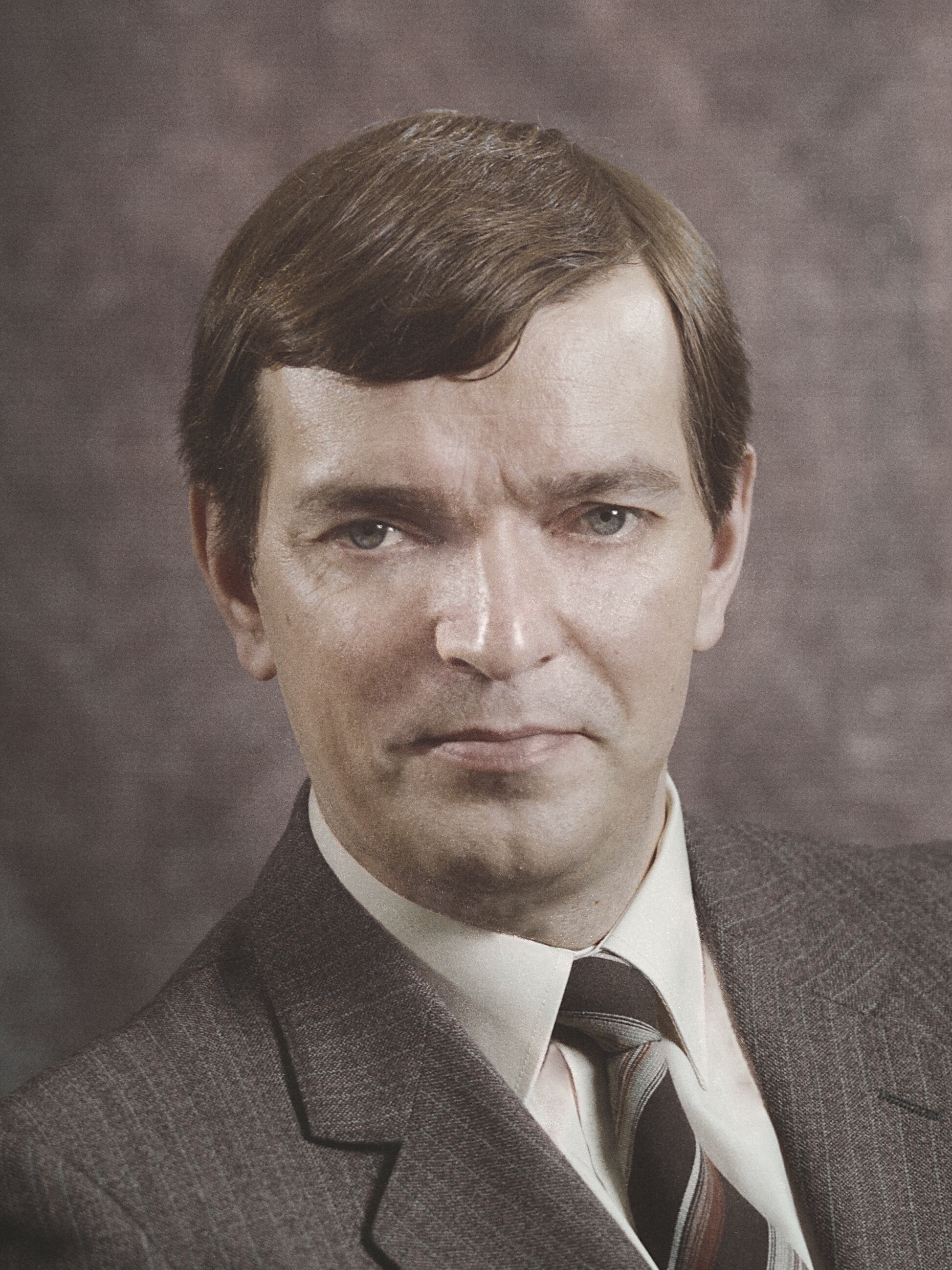
Paavo Väyrynen

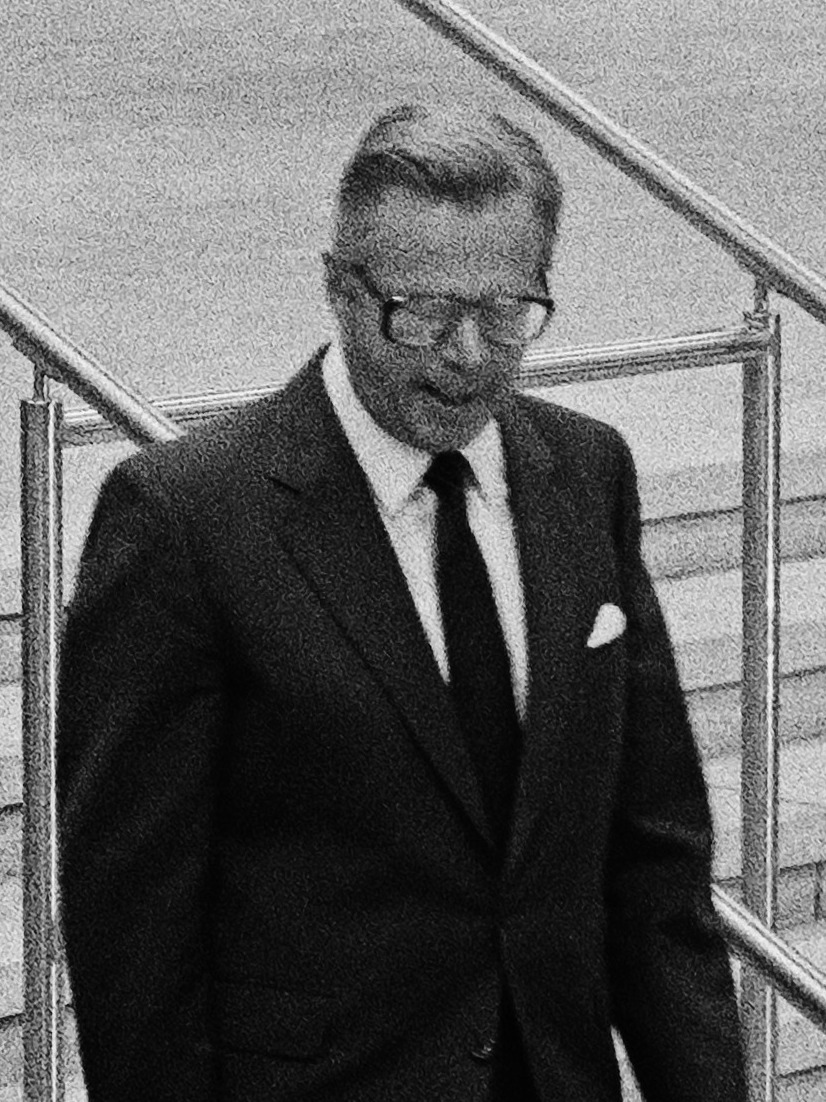
Raimo Ilaskivi

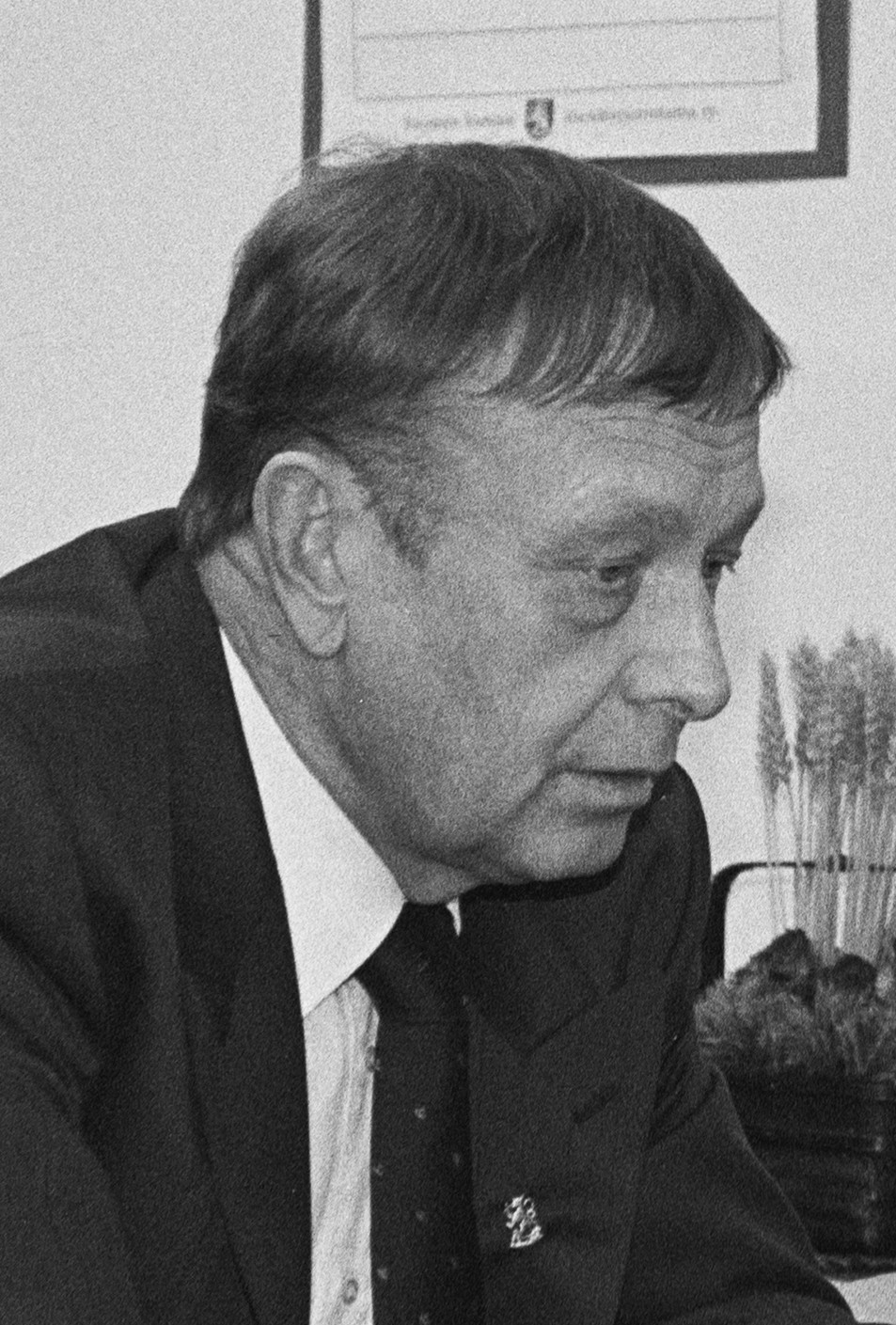
Keijo Korhonen

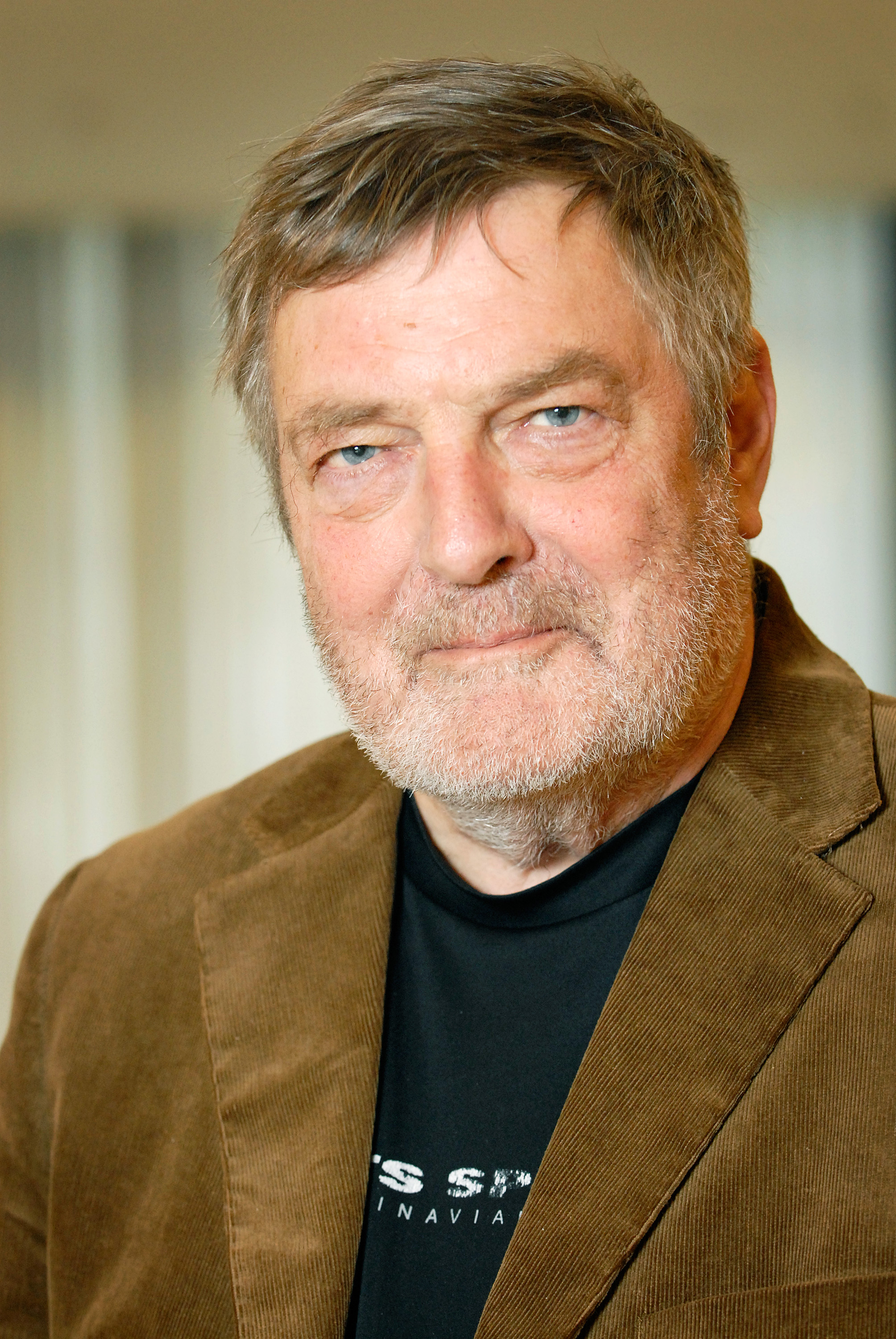
Claes Andersson

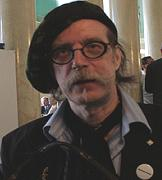
Pertti Virtanen

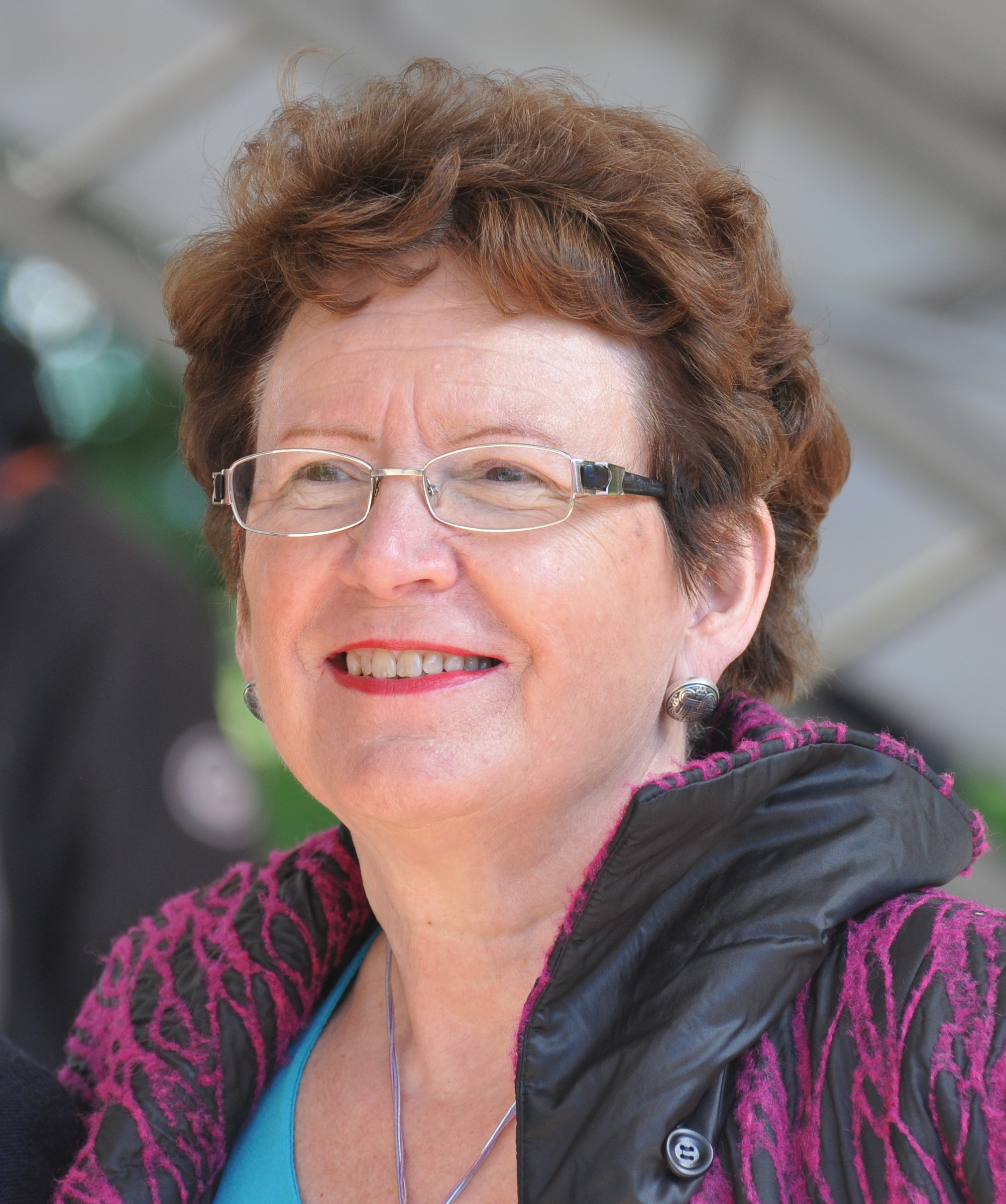
Eeva Kuuskoski

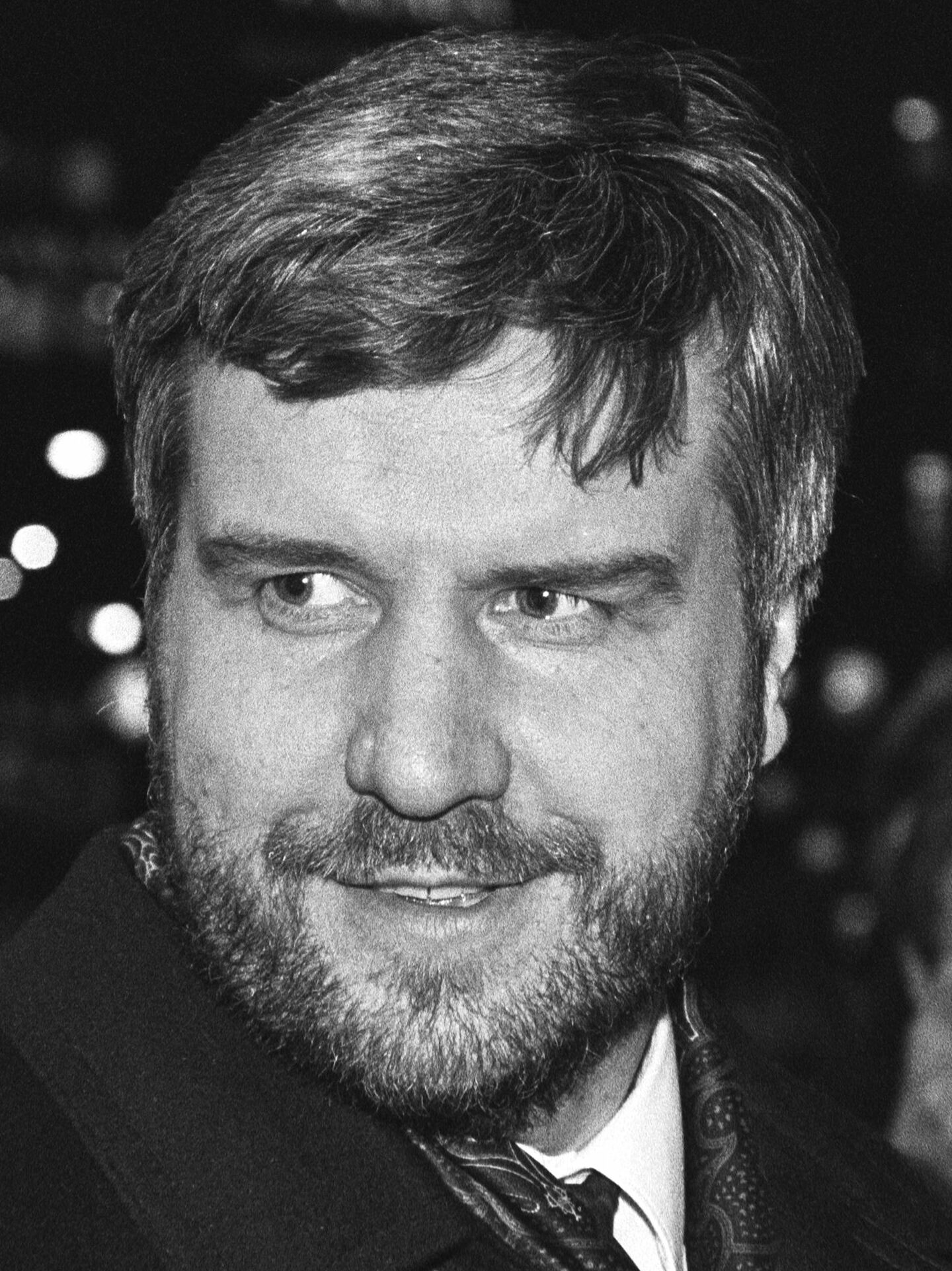
Toimi Kankaanniemi

== Results ==
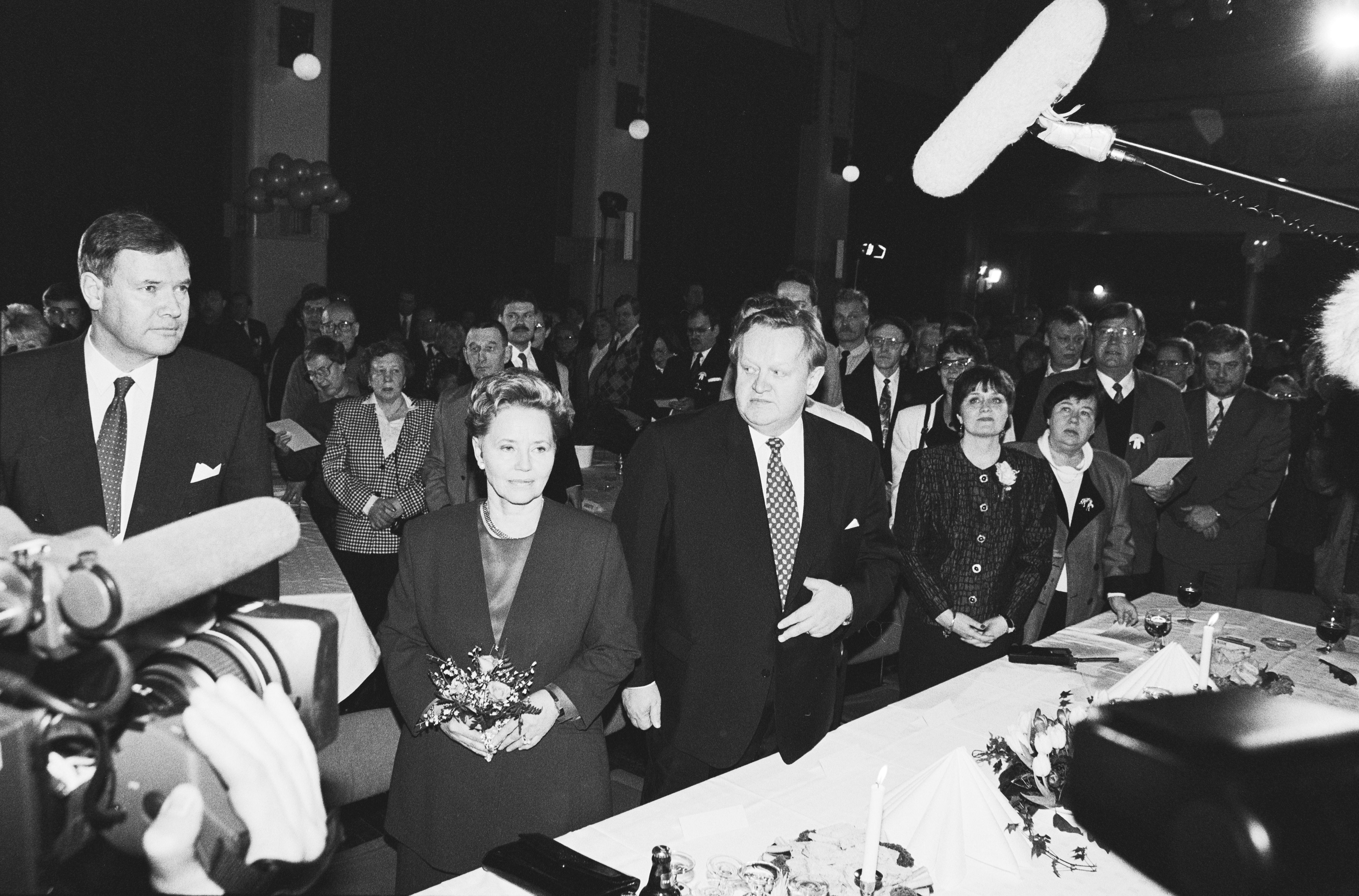
Paavo Lipponen, Eeva and Martti Ahtisaari in the election supervisors

Finland's president Mauno Koivisto with his successor Martti Ahtisaari

Candidate	Party	First round		Second round	
Candidate	Party	Votes	%	Votes	%
Martti Ahtisaari	Social Democratic Party	828,038	25.91	1,723,485	53.86
Elisabeth Rehn	Swedish People's Party	702,211	21.97	1,476,294	46.14
Paavo Väyrynen	Centre Party	623,415	19.51		
Raimo Ilaskivi	National Coalition Party	485,035	15.18		
Keijo Korhonen	Independent	186,936	5.85		
Claes Andersson	Left Alliance	122,820	3.84		
Veltto Virtanen	Independent	95,650	2.99		
Eeva Kuuskoski	Independent	82,453	2.58		
Toimi Kankaanniemi	Christian Democrats	31,453	0.98		
Sulo Aittoniemi	Finnish Rural Party	30,622	0.96		
Pekka Tiainen	Independent	7,320	0.23		
Total		3,195,953	100.00	3,199,779	100.00
Valid votes		3,195,953	99.73	3,199,779	99.53
Invalid/blank votes		8,578	0.27	14,982	0.47
Total votes		3,204,531	100.00	3,214,761	100.00
Registered voters/turnout		4,085,623	78.43	4,085,622	78.68
Source: Nohlen & Stöver, Seppänen

=== By region ===
==== First round ====
Province	Martti Ahtisaari	Elisabeth Rehn	Paavo Väyrynen	Raimo Ilaskivi	Keijo Korhonen	Claes Andersson	Pertti Virtanen	Eeva Kuuskoski	Toimi Kankaanniemi	Sulo Aittoniemi	Pekka Tiainen	Electorate	Votes	Valid	Invalid
South Savo	30,504	17,135	29,499	14,868	5,772	1,743	2,761	2,769	1,671	1,002	116	135,687	108,155	107,840	315
North Savo	38,037	27,176	44,201	16,950	13,950	5,496	3,843	4,639	1,717	1,495	316	199,494	158,201	157,820	381
North Karelia	31,990	14,250	25,274	13,781	10,025	1,874	2,886	3,415	1,601	1,089	181	136,007	106,645	106,366	279
Kainuu	7,824	4,659	13,857	4,039	24,056	2,501	981	1,105	377	247	161	72,982	59,957	59,807	150
Uusimaa	202,936	243,119	57,044	140,850	26,165	31,382	23,520	17,527	4,592	4,284	1,735	903,287	754,803	753,154	1,649
Eastern Uusimaa	13,177	24,561	5,358	5,706	1,518	1,332	1,344	874	335	314	115	65,497	54,712	54,634	78
Southwest Finland	73,468	56,595	44,454	49,355	13,077	12,212	8,336	10,803	1,864	2,665	950	333,960	274,512	273,779	733
Kanta-Häme	33,321	18,841	15,919	19,729	4,801	3,500	3,631	2,452	1,036	1,376	230	127,679	105,206	104,836	370
Päijät-Häme	35,014	26,667	17,546	23,756	6,087	3,992	3,886	2,823	1,533	1,395	278	154,166	123,328	122,977	351
Kymenlaakso	40,345	25,766	19,484	19,627	5,226	2,931	4,432	2,688	1,148	1,204	175	152,635	123,379	123,026	353
South Karelia	27,759	15,972	20,035	13,961	3,964	1,439	2,855	2,085	1,113	836	97	110,687	90,418	90,116	302
Central Finland	46,265	22,417	40,026	17,147	11,120	6,962	5,254	5,049	3,599	1,542	242	197,538	160,106	159,623	483
Southern Ostrobothnia	19,690	12,209	55,281	21,312	7,103	2,396	3,704	2,401	2,055	1,545	185	152,638	128,185	127,881	304
Ostrobothnia	20,403	53,428	15,792	9,506	2,625	3,409	1,925	1,542	1,135	413	143	131,449	110,572	110,321	251
Satakunta	45,678	22,245	31,366	26,590	9,113	8,451	4,744	3,772	1,791	2,085	321	191,434	156,661	156,156	505
Pirkanmaa	75,410	52,243	36,611	50,508	15,933	14,547	11,460	7,260	2,916	5,714	982	333,374	274,420	273,584	836
Central Ostrobothnia	7,941	8,250	17,017	4,045	2,858	1,415	1,278	889	619	585	52	52,894	45,081	44,949	132
Northern Ostrobothnia	43,990	26,725	76,278	19,987	16,637	9,274	5,658	5,984	1,427	1,835	493	252,472	208,853	208,288	565
Lapland	26,543	12,856	54,862	10,177	6,200	7,174	2,806	3,543	674	839	474	151,563	126,563	126,148	415
Åland	1,412	10,459	862	148	49	108	16	80	59	14	6	18,885	13,270	13,213	57
Source: European Election Database

==== Second round ====
Province	Martti Ahtisaari	Elisabeth Rehn	Electorate	Votes	Valid	Invalid
South Savo	56,904	50,551	135,687	107,966	107,455	511
North Savo	85,218	72,608	199,494	158,527	157,826	701
North Karelia	61,239	45,910	136,007	107,648	107,149	499
Kainuu	31,190	24,944	72,982	56,521	56,134	387
Uusimaa	405,872	350,232	903,287	759,479	756,104	3,375
Eastern Uusimaa	24,445	30,795	65,497	55,409	55,240	169
Southwest Finland	156,749	118,022	333,960	276,025	274,771	1,254
Kanta-Häme	61,193	44,596	127,679	106,316	105,789	527
Päijät-Häme	71,546	52,574	154,166	124,720	124,120	600
Kymenlaakso	74,898	50,008	152,635	125,440	124,906	534
South Karelia	50,667	39,902	110,687	91,008	90,569	439
Central Finland	93,637	65,665	197,538	160,106	159,302	804
Southern Ostrobothnia	46,706	76,407	152,638	123,899	123,113	786
Ostrobothnia	41,265	71,028	131,449	112,656	112,293	363
Satakunta	94,844	62,493	191,434	158,070	157,337	733
Pirkanmaa	164,619	109,400	333,374	275,349	274,019	1,330
Central Ostrobothnia	18,144	25,977	52,894	44,332	44,121	211
Northern Ostrobothnia	104,482	101,687	252,472	207,109	206,169	940
Lapland	67,196	55,695	151,563	123,570	122,891	679
Åland	2,531	11,450	18,884	14,028	13,981	47
Source: European Election Database
