= Kuuskoski =

Kuuskoski is a Finnish surname. Notable people with the surname include:

- Eeva Kuuskoski (born 1946), Finnish politician and physician
- Reino Kuuskoski (1907–1965), Finnish politician
