= Tanttu =

Tanttu is a Finnish surname. Notable people with the surname include:

- Aatami Tanttu (1887–1939), Finnish wrestler
- August Tanttu (1859–1937), Finnish farmer and politician
