= Nordic agrarian parties =

Political party type in the Nordic countries

The Nordic agrarian parties, also referred to as Scandinavian agrarian parties or agrarian liberal parties, are agrarian political parties that belong to a political tradition particular to the Nordic countries. Positioning themselves in the centre of the political spectrum, but fulfilling roles distinctive to Nordic countries, they remain hard to classify by conventional political ideology.

These parties are non-socialist and typically combine a commitment to small businesses, rural issues and political decentralisation, and, at times, scepticism towards the European Union. The parties have divergent views on the free market and environmentalism. Internationally, they are most commonly aligned to the Alliance of Liberals and Democrats for Europe (ALDE) and the Liberal International.

Historically farmers' parties, a declining farmer population after the Second World War made them broaden their scope to other issues and sections of society. At this time three of them renamed themselves to Centre Party, with the Finnish Centre Party being the last to do so, in 1965. In the modern period, the main agrarian parties are the Centre Party in Sweden, Venstre in Denmark, Centre Party in Finland, Centre Party in Norway and Progressive Party in Iceland.

== History ==
Compared to continental Europe, the peasants in the Nordic countries historically had an unparalleled degree of political influence. They were not only independent, but also represented as the fourth estate in the national diets, like in the Swedish Riksdag of the Estates. The agrarian movement thus precedes the labour movement by centuries in Iceland, Sweden, Denmark, Finland, and Norway.

The first of the parties, Venstre in Denmark, was formed as a liberal, anti-tax farmers' party in 1870, uniting various groups of bondevenner (friends of the farmers) which had existed since the introduction of democracy in 1849. The rest of the parties emerged in the early 20th century, spurred by the introduction of universal suffrage and proportional representation across the region. Finland's Agrarian League was the first to be created in 1906, followed by the Agrarian Party in Norway in 1915. The Icelandic Progressive Party was founded in 1916 as a merger of two agrarian parties. Sweden's Agrarian Party, founded in 1921, emerged from the existing Lantmanna Party and its splinter groups.

As the Scandinavian farming population declined, the parties moved towards becoming catch-all centrist parties by capturing some of the urban electorate. The Swedish Agrarian Party renamed itself to the Centre Party in 1958. The Norwegian and Finnish parties adopted the same name in 1959 and 1965 respectively.

According to a 2022 study by Magnus Bergli Rasmussen, farmers' parties and farmer representatives had strong incentives to resist welfare state expansion, and farmer MPs consistently opposed generous welfare policies.

After the end of Soviet rule in the Baltic countries, the Estonian Centre Party (established in 1991) and Lithuanian Centre Union (1993) were modelled explicitly on the Swedish example. The Latvian Farmers' Union of the post-communist era views the Nordic agrarian parties as models, too, aiming to be a centrist catch-all party instead of a pure single-interest party of farmers.

== Ideology ==
The parties' attitudes to the free market and economic liberalism are mixed. Whereas the Norwegian Centre Party and Icelandic Progressive Party are opposed to economic liberalisation, the others, most notably the Danish Venstre and Swedish Centerpartiet, are pro-market and put a heavy emphasis on economic growth and productivity. Because of this divide, Venstre are described in some academic literature as the separate 'half-sister' of the Nordic agrarian parties. Nonetheless, all of the parties define themselves as 'non-socialist', while some also distance themselves from the label of 'bourgeois' (borgerlig), which is traditionally reserved for the conservative and liberal parties.

Most of the parties have traditionally sat on the Eurosceptic side in their respective countries. However, for the most part, they hold these positions due to particular policies, with an emphasis on whether they believe European policies to be better or worse for rural communities.

The Centre Party in Norway is the party most opposed to European Union membership, having maintained that position since the 1972 referendum. The Icelandic Progressives are also opposed to membership, while the Danish Venstre is in favour of the European Union and Denmark's entry into the Eurozone.

== Support base ==
While originally supported by farmers, the parties have adapted to declining rural populations by diversifying their political base. The Finnish Centre Party receives only 10% of its support from farmers, while Denmark's Venstre received only 7% of their votes from farmers in 1998. Similarly, in Sweden, between 60 and 70% of farmers voted for the Center Party up until the 1988 elections, but support for the party from the traditional agricultural support base thereafter declined, and today the Center Party's base of support is mostly middle-class voters who do not engage in farming.

== Parties ==
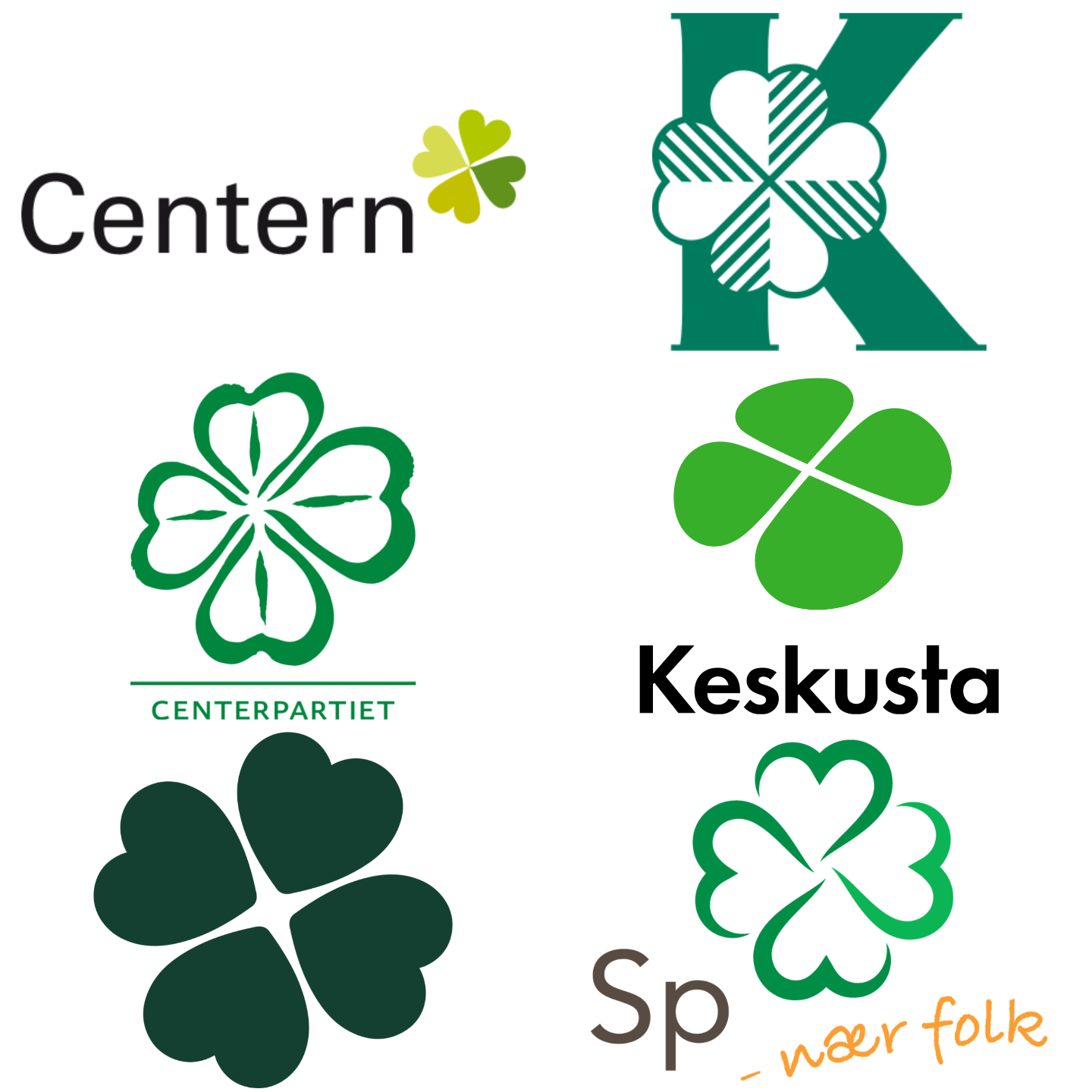
The Centre parties in Sweden, Finland, Norway, Åland and Estonia, have similar backgrounds and identities, as indicated by their similar logos, based on the four-leaf clover

The current Nordic agrarian parties are:

- Åland: Åland Centre
- Denmark: Venstre
- Faroe Islands: Union Party
- Finland: Centre Party
- Iceland: Progressive Party
- Norway: Centre Party
- Sweden: Centre Party

Historical Nordic agrarian parties include:

- Denmark: Farmers' Party
- Finland: Finnish Rural Party

Similar agrarian parties outside the Nordic countries are/were:

- Estonia: Estonian Centre Party
- Latvia: Latvian Farmers' Union
- Lithuania: Lithuanian Centre Union (until 2003)

== See also ==
- Agrarian parties of Finland
- Centre Group
- International Agrarian Bureau
- Krestintern
- List of agrarian parties

== Bibliography ==
- Arter, David (1999). Scandinavian Politics Today. Manchester: Manchester University Press. ISBN 978-0-7190-5133-3.
- Arter, David (2001). From Farmyard to City Square?: the Electoral Adaptation of the Nordic Agrarian Parties. Ann Arbor: University of Michigan Press. ISBN 978-0-7546-2084-6.
- Esaiasson, Peter; Heidar, Knut (1999). Beyond Westminster and Congress: the Nordic Experience. Columbus: Ohio State University Press. ISBN 978-0-8142-0839-7.
- Hilson, Mary (2008). The Nordic Model: Scandinavia Since 1945. Ann Arbor: University of Michigan Press. ISBN 978-1-86189-366-6.
- Kristinsson, Gunnar Helgi. 1991. Farmer's Parties: A Study in Electoral Adaptation. Félagsvísindastofnun Háskóla Íslands.
- Ruostetsaari, Ilkka (2007). Cotta, Maurizio; Best, Heinrich (eds.). Restructuring of the European Political Centre: Withering Liberal and Persisting Agrarian Party Families. Oxford: Oxford University Press. pp. 217–252. ISBN 978-0-19-923420-2.
- Siaroff, Alan (2000). Comparative European Party Systems: an Analysis of Parliamentary Elections. London: Taylor & Francis. ISBN 978-0-8153-2930-5.
