= Otto Karhi Park =

Park in Oulu, Finland

Coordinates: 65°00′44″N 025°28′29″E

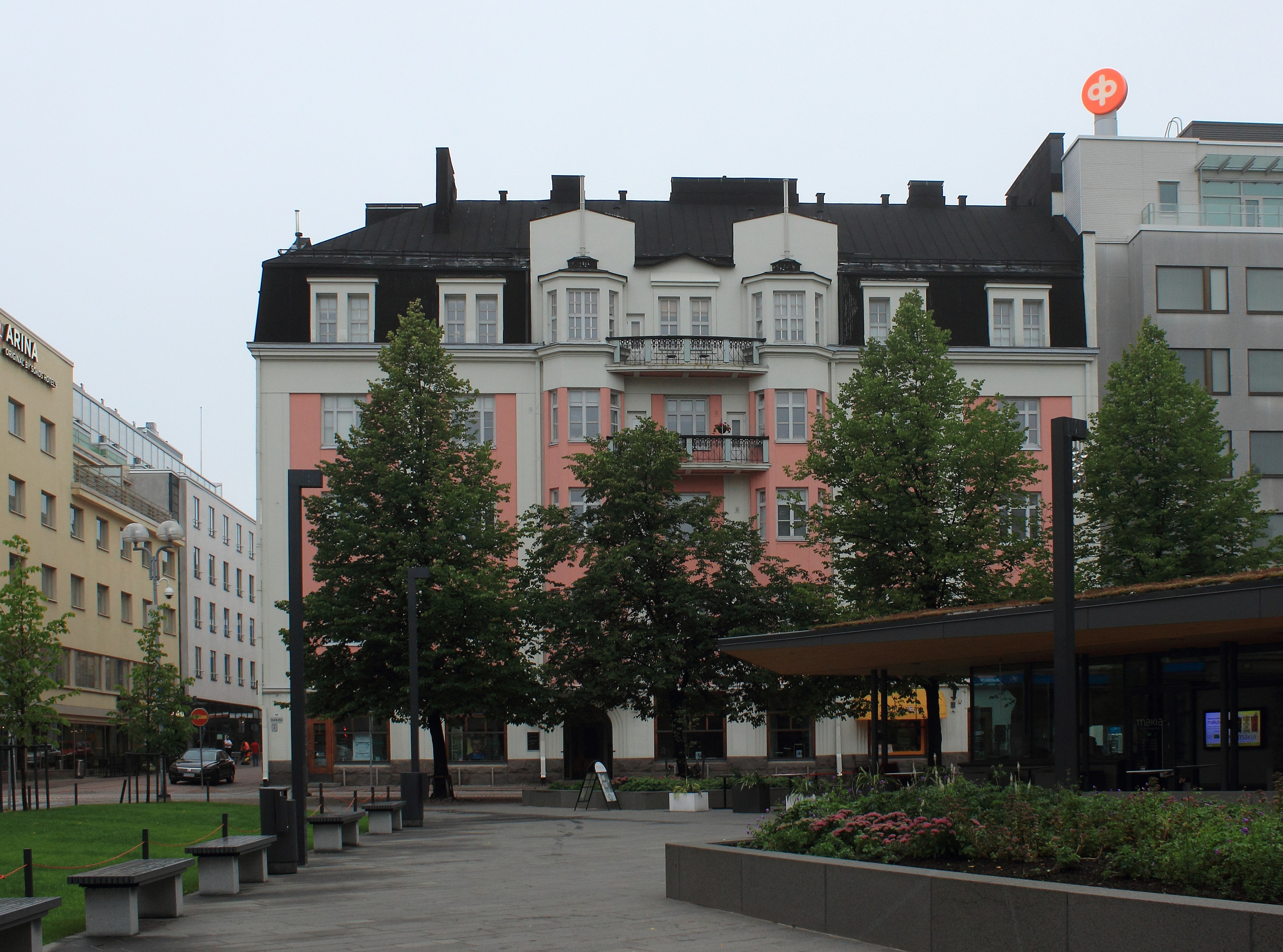
Puistola House photographed from Otto Karhi Park

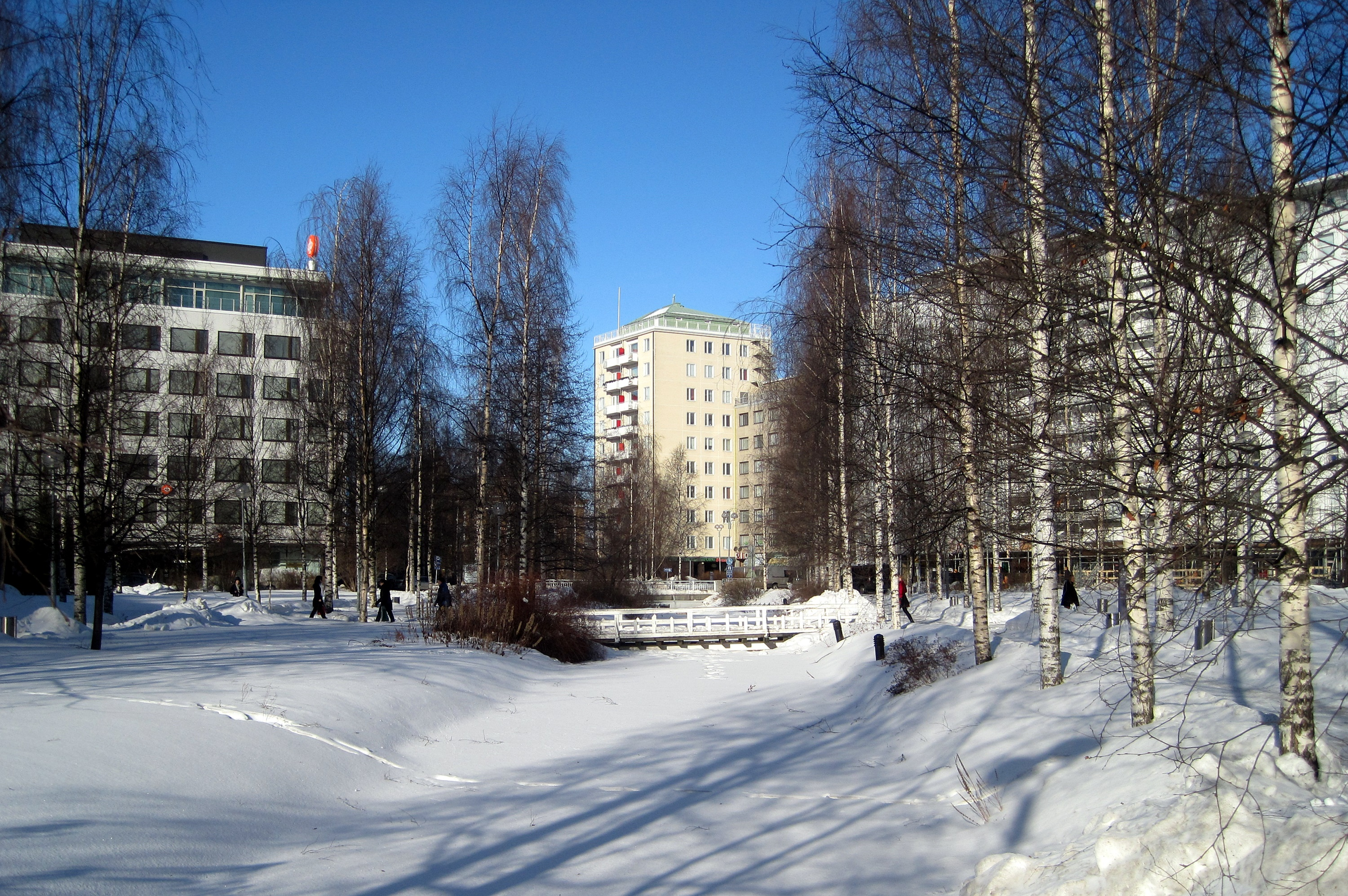
Otto Karhi Park in March 2011

Otto Karhi Park (Finnish: Otto Karhin puisto) is a public park in the Pokkinen district in the city centre of Oulu, Finland. The park has been named after Otto Karhi, a politician from Oulu.
