= Keijo Korhonen (politician) =

Finnish politician, diplomat, and professor (1934–2022)

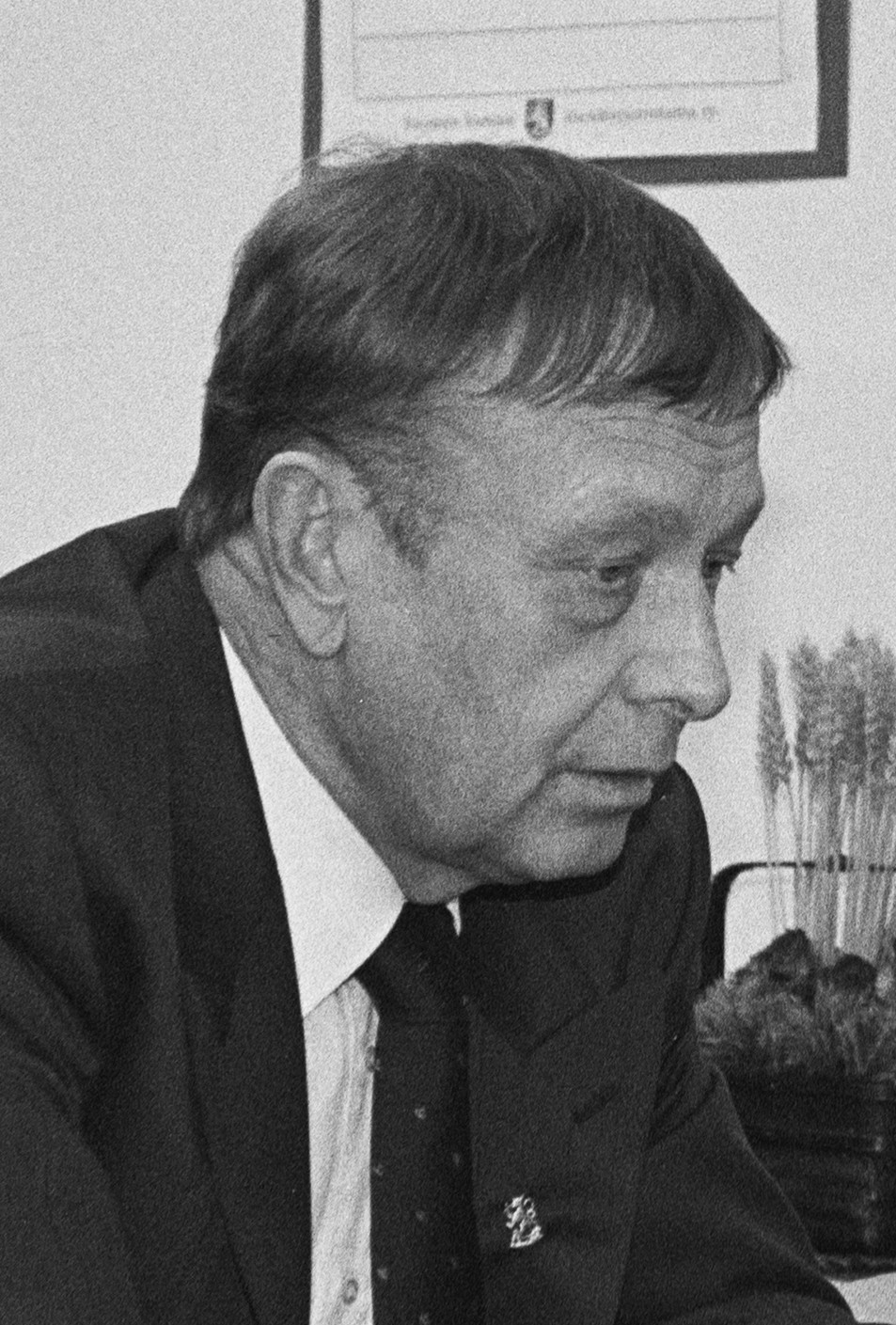
- Korhonen in 1993

Foreign Minister of Finland
- In office 29 September 1976 – 15 May 1977
- Preceded by: Kalevi Sorsa
- Succeeded by: Paavo Väyrynen

Personal details
- Born: 23 February 1934 Paltamo, Finland
- Died: 6 June 2022 (aged 88) Tucson, Arizona, U.S.
- Party: Centre Party
- Spouse: Anita Uggeldahl
- Education: University of Turku
- Occupation: Politician, professor at University of Arizona

Keijo Tero Korhonen (23 February 1934 – 6 June 2022) was a Finnish politician, ambassador, and professor. During his political career, he served as the Finnish foreign minister and Permanent Representative of Finland to the United Nations. He was an unsuccessful candidate for President of Finland in 1994. He was also a professor at the University of Helsinki and an adjunct professor at the University of Arizona.

== Political career ==
Korhonen was the Finnish foreign minister between 1976 and 1977 representing the Centre Party. From 1983 to 1988, he was the Permanent Representative of Finland to the United Nations. Korhonen was an independent candidate for the presidential election in 1994. He challenged Paavo Väyrynen who was the candidate of central party in Finland. They were both members of the party, but a majority of the party has changed toward EU-membership after the party leader Esko Aho took the power and supported EU-membership. Korhonen decided to work against EU-membership and for that reason decided to participate in presidential election outside his own party which supported EU-membership.

== Views and controversy ==
Korhonen was known for his critical views against the European Union. He is the author of several books about foreign politics and the United Nations. Furthermore, Korhonen penned columns for Finnish newspapers and magazines.

According to the former secretary of the Norwegian Nobel Committee Geir Lundestad's memoir, former Foreign Minister and UN ambassador, professor Korhonen was strongly opposed to the committee awarding the 2008 Nobel Peace Prize to Martti Ahtisaari. Lundestad claimed Korhonen even wrote a letter to the committee criticizing Ahtisaari both personally and for his merits in international conflict zones. Korhonen, however, denied writing any letter to the Nobel Committee.

== Death ==
Korhonen died in Tucson, Arizona, on 6 June 2022, at the age of 88.

Political offices
Preceded by Kalevi Sorsa	Foreign Minister of Finland; 1976–1977	Succeeded by Paavo Väyrynen
