= Kalmari =

Kalmari is a Finnish surname. Notable people with the surname include:

- Anne Kalmari (born 1968), Finnish politician
- Johan Richard Danielson-Kalmari (1853–1933), Finnish politician and historian
- Laura Österberg Kalmari (born 1979), Finnish footballer
