= Young Finnish Agrarian League of the Southern Ostrobothnia =

Finnish political party

Young Finnish Agrarian League of the Southern Ostrobothnia Etelä-Pohjanmaan Nuorsuomalainen Maalaisliitto
- Leader: Santeri Alkio
- Founded: 21 October 1906
- Dissolved: 1908; 118 years ago
- Newspaper: Ilkka
- Ideology: Agrarianism
- Political position: Centre

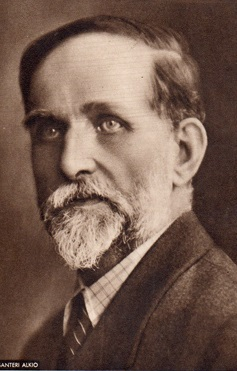
Santeri Alkio

Young Finnish Agrarian League of the Southern Ostrobothnia (Finnish: Etelä-Pohjanmaan Nuorsuomalainen Maalaisliitto) was a party established on 21–22 October 1906 in Kauhava. It worked as an internal fraction of the Young Finnish Party (Finnish: Nuorsuomalainen Puolue) or Constitutional-Fennoman Party (Finnish: Perustuslaillis-Suomenmielinen Puolue). The strong man of the party was Santeri Alkio, who became elected as a member of the parliament of Finland on the list of Constitutional-Fennoman Party. He later formed his own parliamentary group of League of the Rural People of Finland. As it was obvious, that for the next elections both the Agrarian parties should be united, they formed Agrarian League in 1908. In parliamentary elections 1907 Young Finnish Agrarian League of the Southern Ostrobothnia had three candidates in the Vaasa southern electoral district, Vaasa eastern electoral district and Vaasa northern electoral district in electoral alliance with the Young Finnish Party. Santeri Alkio was elected and also two Young Finns' candidates. On 29 December 1907, the Young Finnish Agrarian League of the Southern Ostrobothnia agreed of merger with the League of the Rural People of Finland just for the elections.
