= Taavetti Heimonen =

Finnish politician (1870–1920)

David (Taavetti) Heimonen (13 October 1870, Karttula - 1 June 1920) was a Finnish tenant farmer, agricultural consultant, accountant and politician. He was a member of the Parliament of Finland from 1917 until his death in 1920. He represented the People's Party from 1917 to 1918 and the National Progressive Party from 1918 to 1920.
