= Veltto Virtanen =

Finnish politician

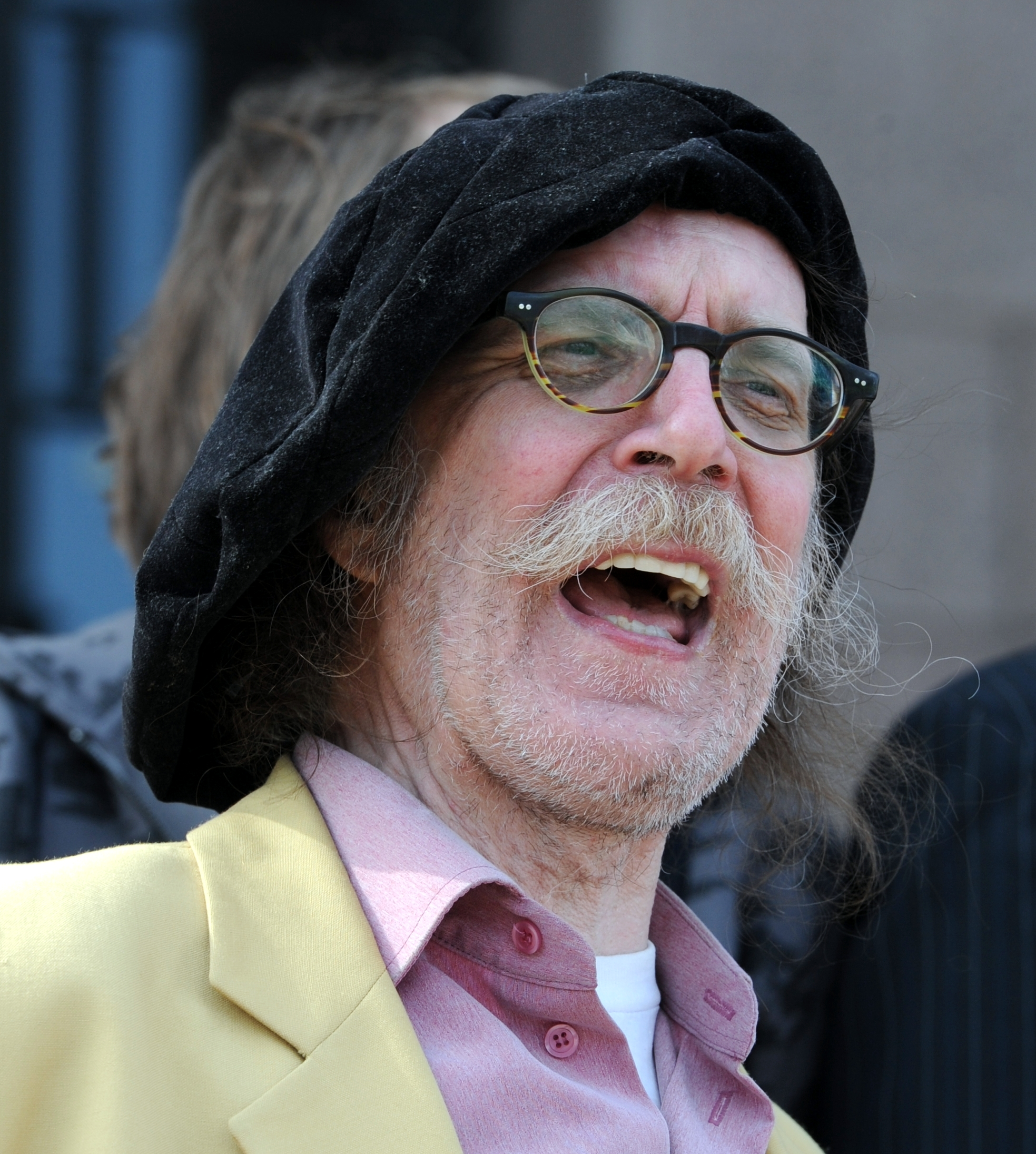

Member of the Finnish Parliament for Pirkanmaa
- In office 21 March 2007 – 21 April 2015

Member of the Finnish Parliament for Northern Tavastia
- In office 24 March 1995 – 23 March 1999

Personal details
- Born: 18 May 1951 (age 74) Hämeenlinna, Finland
- Party: The Finns Party(2007–); Ecological Party 1995–1999
- Website: www.velttovirtanen.net

Pertti Olavi "Veltto" Virtanen (born 18 May 1951) is a Finnish rock personality, former presidential candidate, and former member of the Finnish Parliament from Tampere, Finland.

In music, he performed both as a solo artist and in the bands Virtanen (with Moog Konttinen), Välikausitakki and Sammas. Elektroninen xstaasi is considered the most famous of Veltto Virtanen's songs. Välikausitakki was notable for including Mikko Alatalo, Harri Rinne and later also Juice Leskinen.

After running as a protest candidate in the 1994 presidential election, his surprisingly high popular vote spurred him to run in the 1995 election for the Eduskunta as an essentially independent candidate, and succeeded in winning a seat. His terms in the Parliament were characteristically quixotic; the speeches he made being exercises in near-shamanistic elocution, and counter to parliamentary protocol refusing to bare his head, sporting various headgear, but being most famous for his "artistic" beret.

The minor party Ekologinen puolue Vihreät, with which Virtanen tactically allied, never won any other seats; thus he formed a one-man party-group in the parliament. Later Virtanen's supporters took over the party and renamed it. Critics of the phenomenon of his political success wrote a critical book about it titled Huijari - Veltto Virtanen & Kirjava Puolue (publisher: Veitikka Kustannus 1999).

He continued in elective politics by running in the 1999 and 2003 parliamentary elections, but failed to win a seat due to the Finnish D'Hondt method of voting which favours large parties over minor ones.

Virtanen became again a member of Parliament in parliamentary elections of 2007, this time representing the Finns party. He served two terms but did not run for re-election anymore in the parliamentary elections of 2015

Virtanen was elected to the Tampere city council in 2000 with 2038 votes.

Besides his musical and political career, he has also worked as a motivational speaker, most notably for some winter sports teams. On May Day 2011 the newly elected member of the parliament delivered a somewhat controversial political Mayday speech, where he stated that if the Swedish People's Party were to become part of the next cabinet with the Finns party, he would resign from the party and vomit for five days.

== List of albums ==
- Virtanen: Hal-00 (1974)
- Virtanen: Uusi jääkausi uhkaa (1975)
- Kusessa (1976)
- Ronkpukki (1978)
- Välikausitakki: Välikausitakki (1978)
- Tässä seison (1978)
- Beibi (1982)
- Virtanen: Klassikot - Ne Surkeimmat (1990)
- Sammas: Sampo-Passio (1990)
