= Otto Karhi =

Finnish politician (1876–1966)

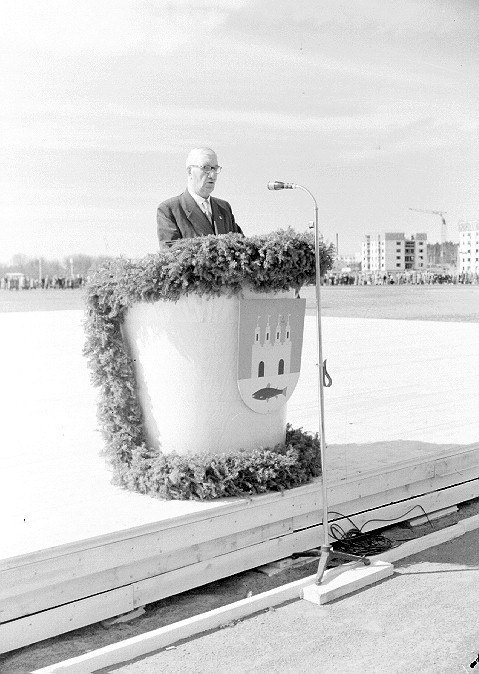
Otto Karhi.

Otto Karhi (originally Lindgrén, 17 April 1876 – 7 June 1966) was the first Chairman of Centre Party, then the League of the Rural People of Finland from 1906 to 1908. He was a member of the Parliament of Finland from 1907 to 1908 and again from 1909 to 1913 from Oulu southern electoral district. He quit the Agrarian League in 1914 and stayed passive politically some years. Karhi was born and died in Oulu. In 1918 he was elected to the city council of Oulu as a representative of the Social Democratic Party of Finland and became re-elected until 1964.

His main work after the entrepreneurial career was to be the managing director of Oulun Osuuskauppa, the Cooperative regional stores in Oulu region from 1916 to 1964. He had been in the process of establishing Suomen Osuuskauppojen Keskuskunta (SOK) in 1904 and also Kulutusosuuskuntien Keskusliitto (KK).

There is a park named after him in Oulu.
