= Kaarlo Vuokoski =

Finnish politician

Karl (Kaarlo) William Vuokoski (7 September 1880, Hollola - 5 June 1944; surname until 1905 Westerberg) was a Finnish farmer and politician. he was a member of the Parliament of Finland from 1917 to 1922 and from 1924 to 1927, representing the People's Party from 1917 to 1918 and the National Progressive Party from 1918 on.
