= 2000 Finnish presidential election =

- 16 January 2000 (first round); 6 February 2000 (second round)
- Turnout: 73.63% (first round); 76.83% (second round)
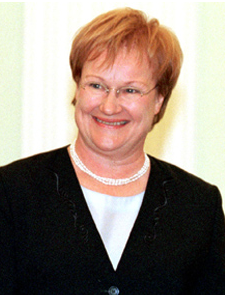

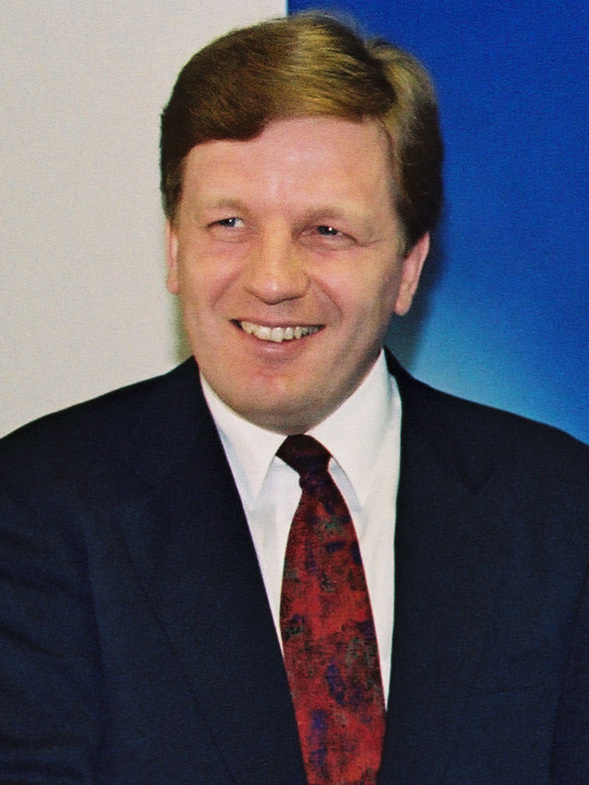
Candidate	Tarja Halonen	Esko Aho
Party	SDP	Centre
Popular vote	1,644,532	1,540,803
Percentage	51.63%	48.37%
- Tarja Halonen Esko Aho Elisabeth Rehn Tarja Halonen Esko Aho
President before election
Martti Ahtisaari
SDP
Elected President
Tarja Halonen
SDP

Presidential elections were held in Finland on 16 January 2000, with a second round on 6 February.

The result was a victory for Tarja Halonen of the Social Democratic Party, who became the country's first female president. During the elections Halonen was the incumbent Minister for Foreign Affairs. President Martti Ahtisaari had indicated in January 1999 that he would accept the Social Democratic Party's nomination for the 2000 presidential elections, but only if no presidential primary was held. However, Jacob Söderman announced his candidacy at the start of April 1999, and during the final week of that month, Ahtisaari announced that he would not seek the Social Democratic presidential candidacy. In his memoirs, Ahtisaari claims that Tarja Halonen badly wanted to become president, a claim that Halonen has denied.

There were three other female presidential candidates in 2000: Riitta Uosukainen of the National Coalition, Elisabeth Rehn of the Swedish People's Party, and Heidi Hautala of the Greens. Halonen's popularity rose significantly during the last few months before the first round of the 2000 presidential elections, while Uosukainen's and Rehn's popularity declined. Former Prime Minister Esko Aho, the Centrist presidential candidate, emerged as the second most popular candidate. Halonen received votes from women across party lines, and she was partly helped by her lack of a major left-wing opponent, and by her reputation as a tolerant, human rights-oriented person. The election was decided by slightly over 100,000 votes, and the voter turnout was much higher than in the 1996 municipal elections or in the 1999 parliamentary elections.

== Candidates ==
Gallery of announced candidates

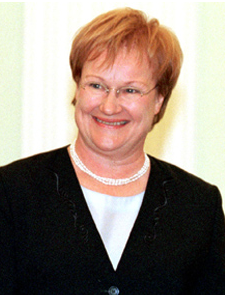
Tarja Halonen

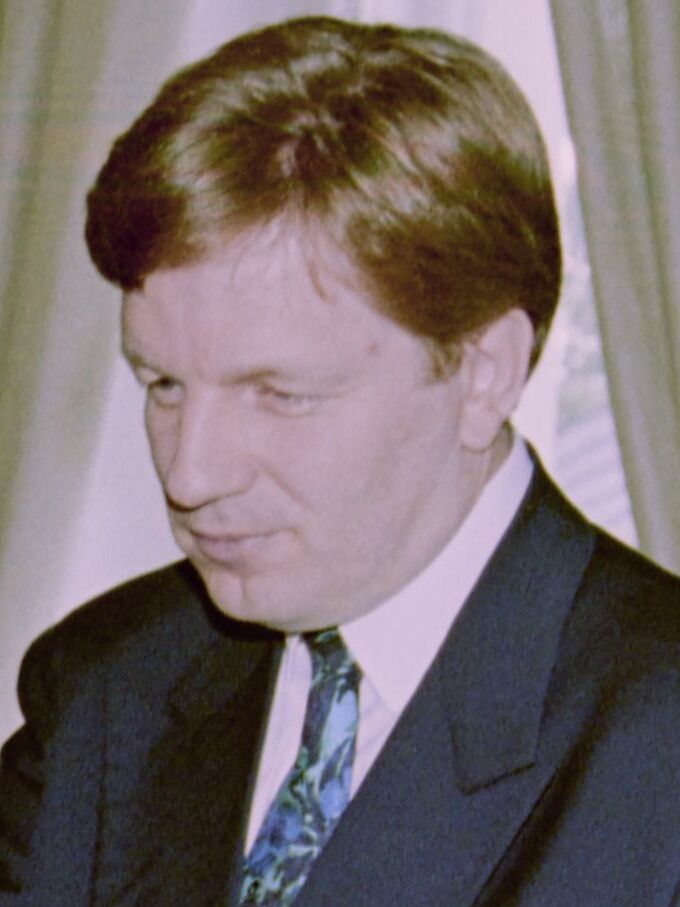
Esko Aho

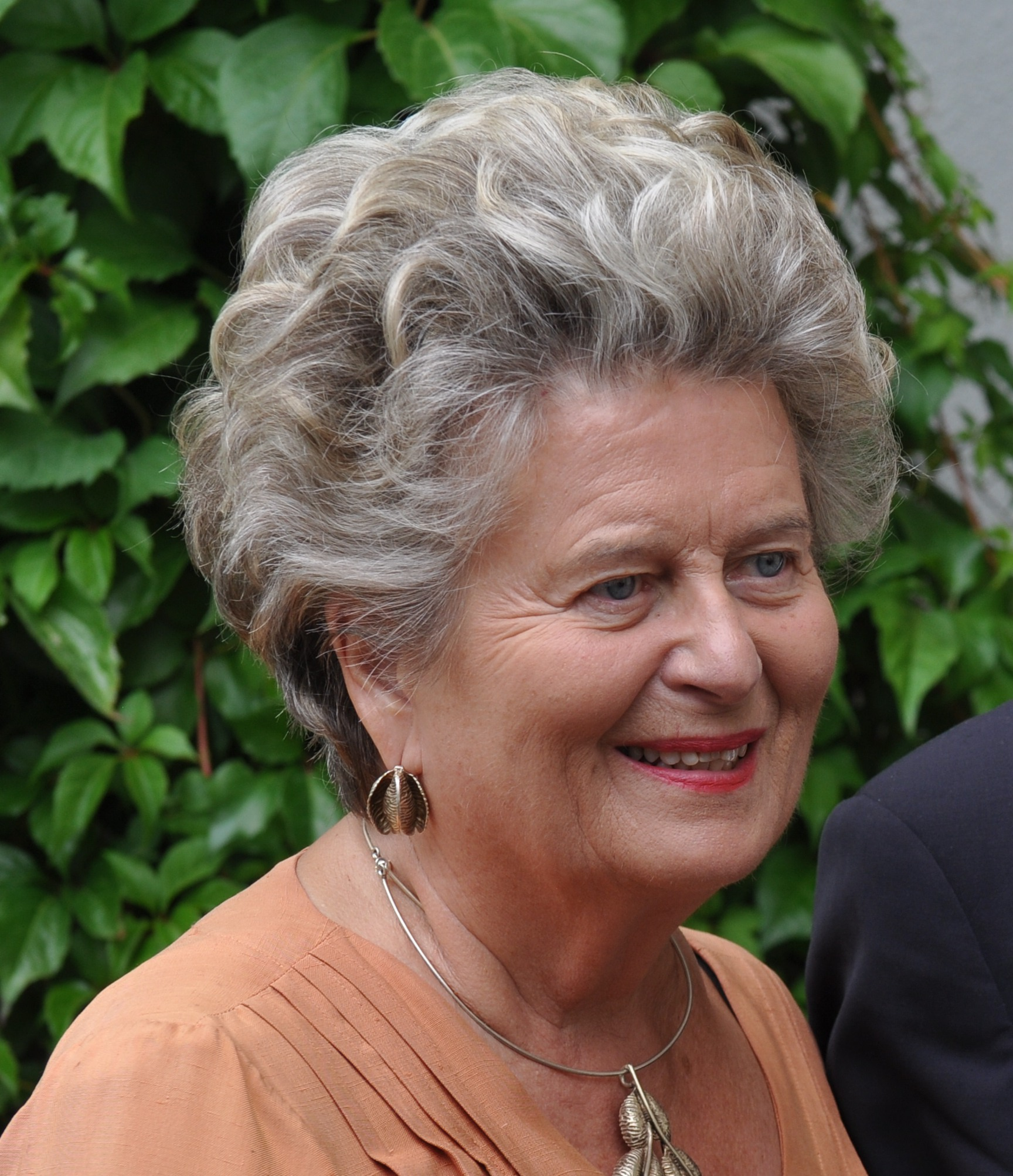
Riitta Uosukainen

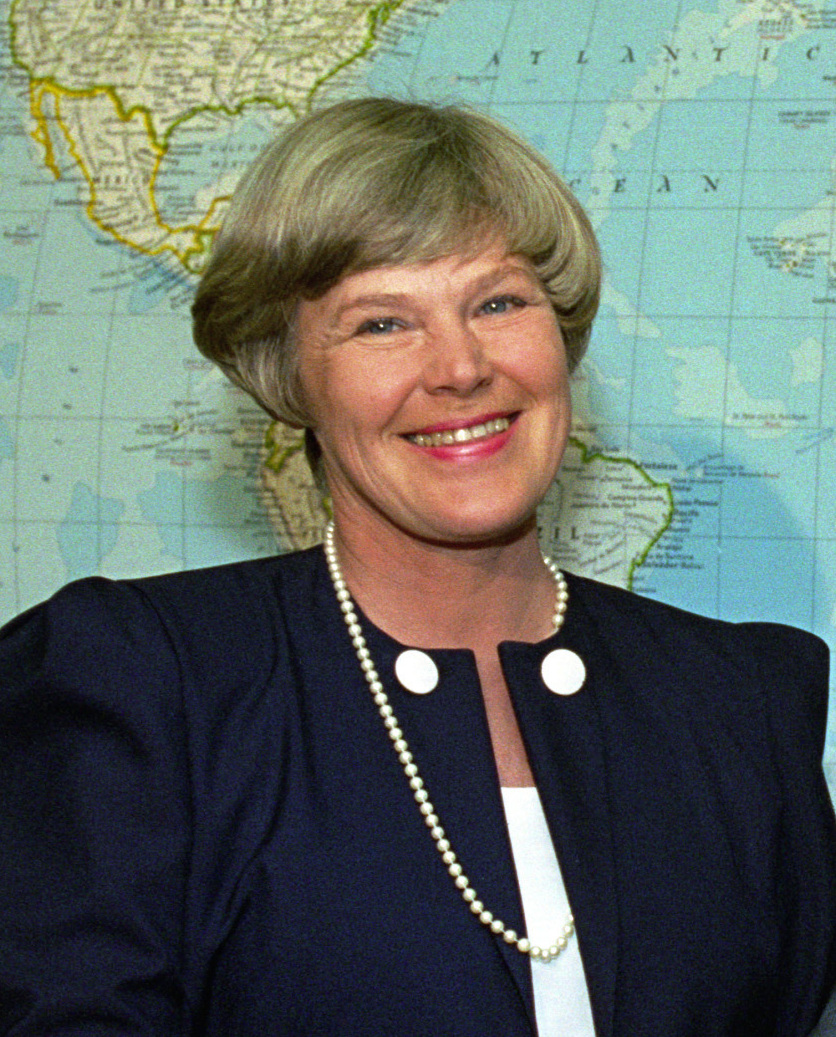
Elisabeth Rehn

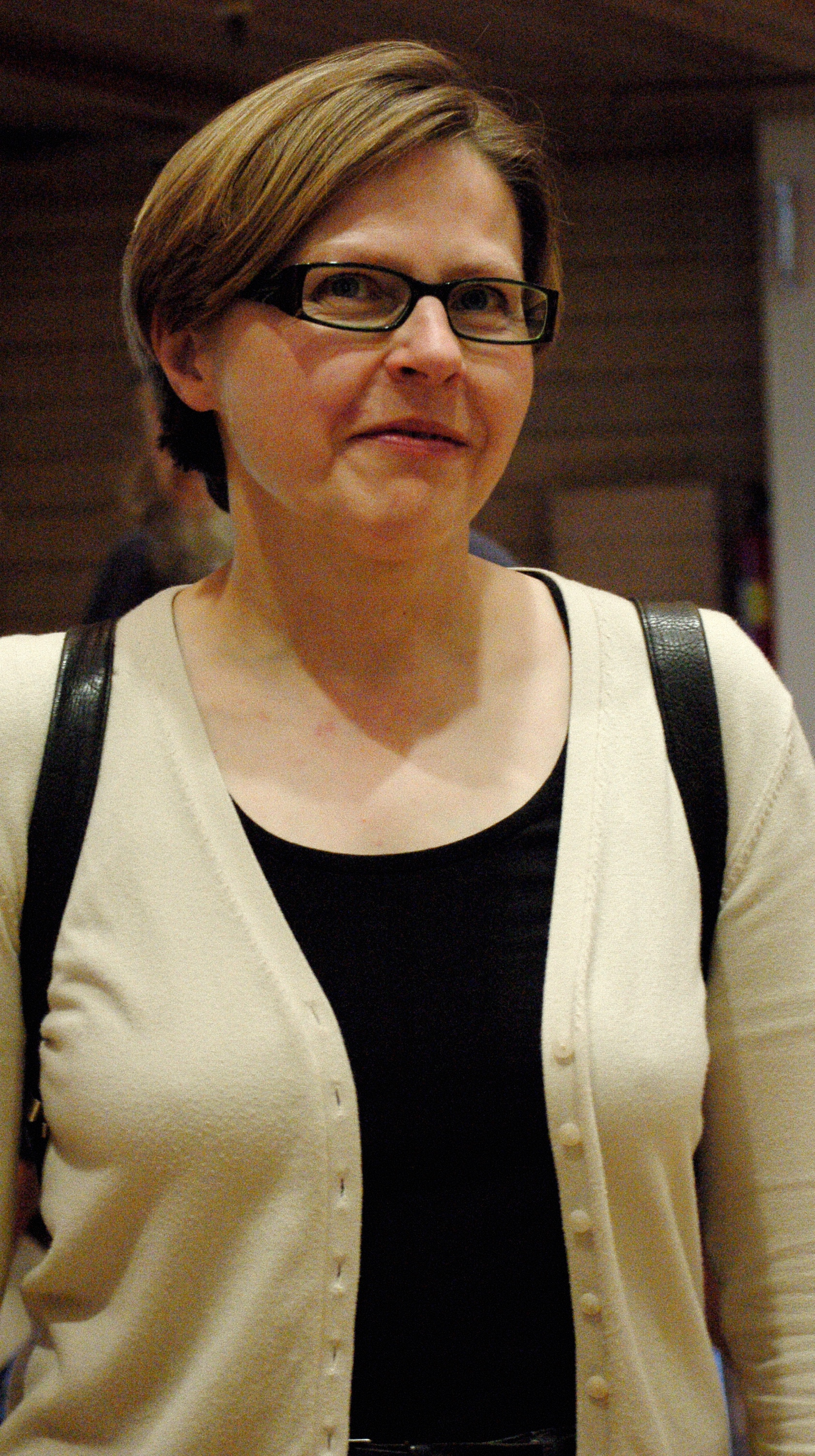
Heidi Hautala

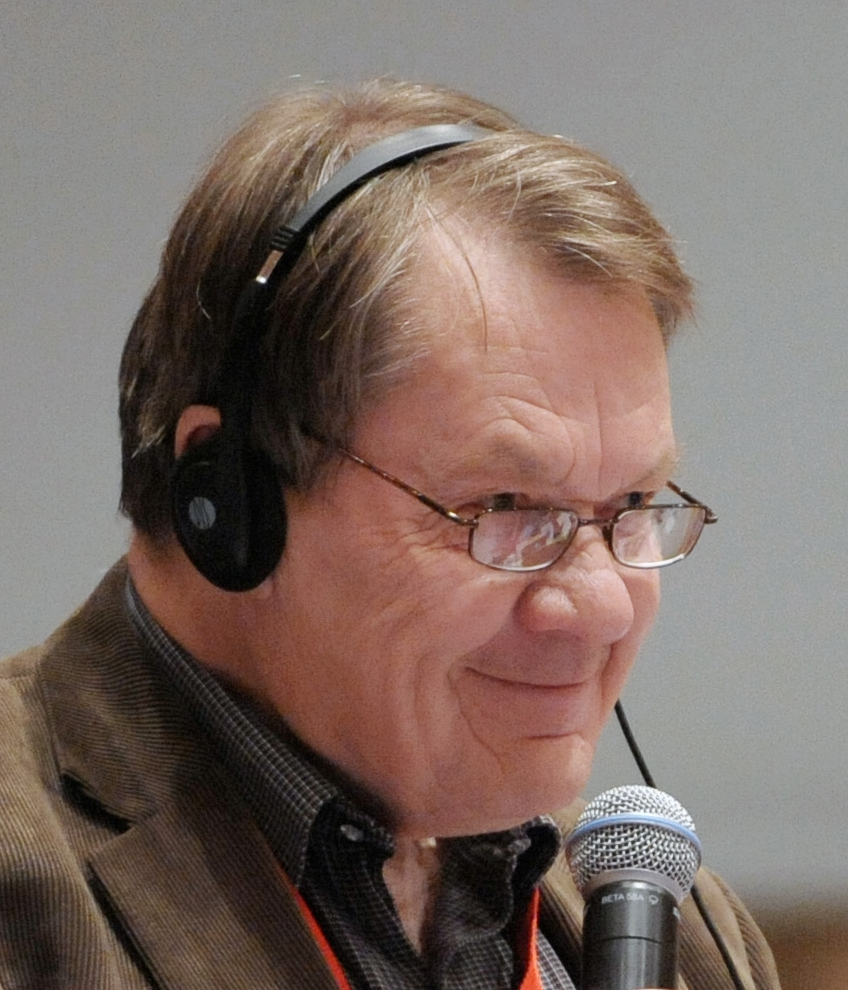
Risto Kuisma

== Results ==
Candidate	Party	First round		Second round	
Candidate	Party	Votes	%	Votes	%
Tarja Halonen	Social Democratic Party	1,224,431	40.03	1,644,532	51.63
Esko Aho	Centre Party	1,051,159	34.36	1,540,803	48.37
Riitta Uosukainen	National Coalition Party	392,305	12.83		
Elisabeth Rehn	Swedish People's Party	241,877	7.91		
Heidi Hautala	Green League	100,740	3.29		
Ilkka Hakalehto	True Finns	31,405	1.03		
Risto Kuisma	Reform Group	16,943	0.55		
Total		3,058,860	100.00	3,185,335	100.00
Valid votes		3,058,860	99.70	3,185,335	99.49
Invalid/blank votes		9,290	0.30	16,378	0.51
Total votes		3,068,150	100.00	3,201,713	100.00
Registered voters/turnout		4,167,200	73.63	4,167,204	76.83
Source: Nohlen & Stöver

=== By region ===
==== First round ====
Province	Halonen	Aho	Uosukainen	Rehn	Hautala	Hakalehto	Kuisma	Electorate	Votes	Valid	Invalid
South Savo	35,260	43,780	12,433	3,087	2,225	1,060	514	135,153	98,662	98,359	303
North Savo	54,265	68,795	13,141	5,365	3,102	1,538	643	203,996	147,259	146,849	410
North Karelia	37,612	42,993	10,251	2,952	2,240	1,179	512	136,788	98,083	97,739	344
Kainuu	17,158	27,755	3,857	1,271	876	621	219	72,971	51,906	51,757	149
Uusimaa	356,278	155,713	113,873	93,360	41,165	6,290	5,115	1,030,546	774,121	771,794	2,327
Eastern Uusimaa	19,030	12,023	5,029	14,437	1,672	364	438	70,205	53,103	52,993	110
Southwest Finland	114,662	78,960	38,931	20,514	9,608	3,168	1,523	360,024	268,209	267,366	843
Kanta-Häme	43,203	30,890	15,694	4,504	2,661	970	616	131,166	98,872	98,538	334
Päijät-Häme	49,788	35,402	18,891	5,168	3,244	1,180	666	159,063	114,666	114,339	327
Kymenlaakso	49,686	34,703	19,433	4,561	2,836	947	835	154,744	113,433	113,001	432
South Karelia	29,343	29,528	20,283	2,027	1,818	664	433	112,325	84,394	84,096	298
Central Finland	59,858	65,501	15,592	5,731	4,645	1,555	723	210,868	154,006	153,605	401
Southern Ostrobothnia	23,336	74,567	14,157	3,495	1,454	1,454	361	158,210	119,150	118,824	326
Ostrobothnia	26,816	32,482	6,778	36,010	1,947	640	241	150,093	105,188	104,914	274
Satakunta	62,701	52,059	17,695	5,378	3,090	1,950	714	194,211	143,999	143,587	412
Pirkanmaa	120,017	81,436	38,378	13,857	9,210	3,652	1,784	358,640	269,210	268,334	876
Central Ostrobothnia	10,724	25,829	2,333	3,008	641	590	132	57,955	43,373	43,257	116
Northern Ostrobothnia	70,230	100,314	16,076	7,392	5,828	2,643	1,005	280,748	204,028	203,488	540
Lapland	42,685	55,712	9,249	3,285	2,313	926	458	164,904	115,045	114,628	417
Åland	1,779	2,717	231	6,475	165	14	11	24,590	11,443	11,392	51

==== Second round ====
Province	Halonen	Aho	Electorate	Votes	Valid	Invalid
South Savo	46,669	57,195	135,153	104,363	103,864	499
North Savo	70,149	86,573	203,997	157,250	156,722	528
North Karelia	48,614	55,753	136,788	104,855	104,367	488
Kainuu	21,636	34,104	72,971	55,954	55,740	214
Uusimaa	495,469	290,348	1,030,549	790,870	785,817	5,053
Eastern Uusimaa	28,096	25,953	70,205	54,342	54,049	293
Southwest Finland	152,539	123,259	360,024	277,162	275,798	1,364
Kanta-Häme	56,557	45,674	131,166	102,830	102,231	599
Päijät-Häme	66,660	52,298	159,063	119,560	118,958	602
Kymenlaakso	67,048	50,775	154,744	118,443	117,823	620
South Karelia	41,742	44,091	112,325	86,320	85,833	487
Central Finland	78,495	84,227	210,868	163,374	162,722	652
Southern Ostrobothnia	32,065	93,911	158,210	126,547	125,976	571
Ostrobothnia	39,019	69,890	150,093	109,447	108,909	538
Satakunta	79,604	71,178	194,211	151,471	150,782	689
Pirkanmaa	157,589	120,669	358,640	279,668	278,258	1,410
Central Ostrobothnia	13,298	32,750	57,955	46,220	46,048	172
Northern Ostrobothnia	90,618	126,767	280,748	218,316	217,385	931
Lapland	53,965	68,162	164,904	122,674	122,127	547
Åland	4,700	7,226	24,590	12,047	11,926	121
