= Eeva Kuuskoski =

Finnish politician and physician (born 1946)

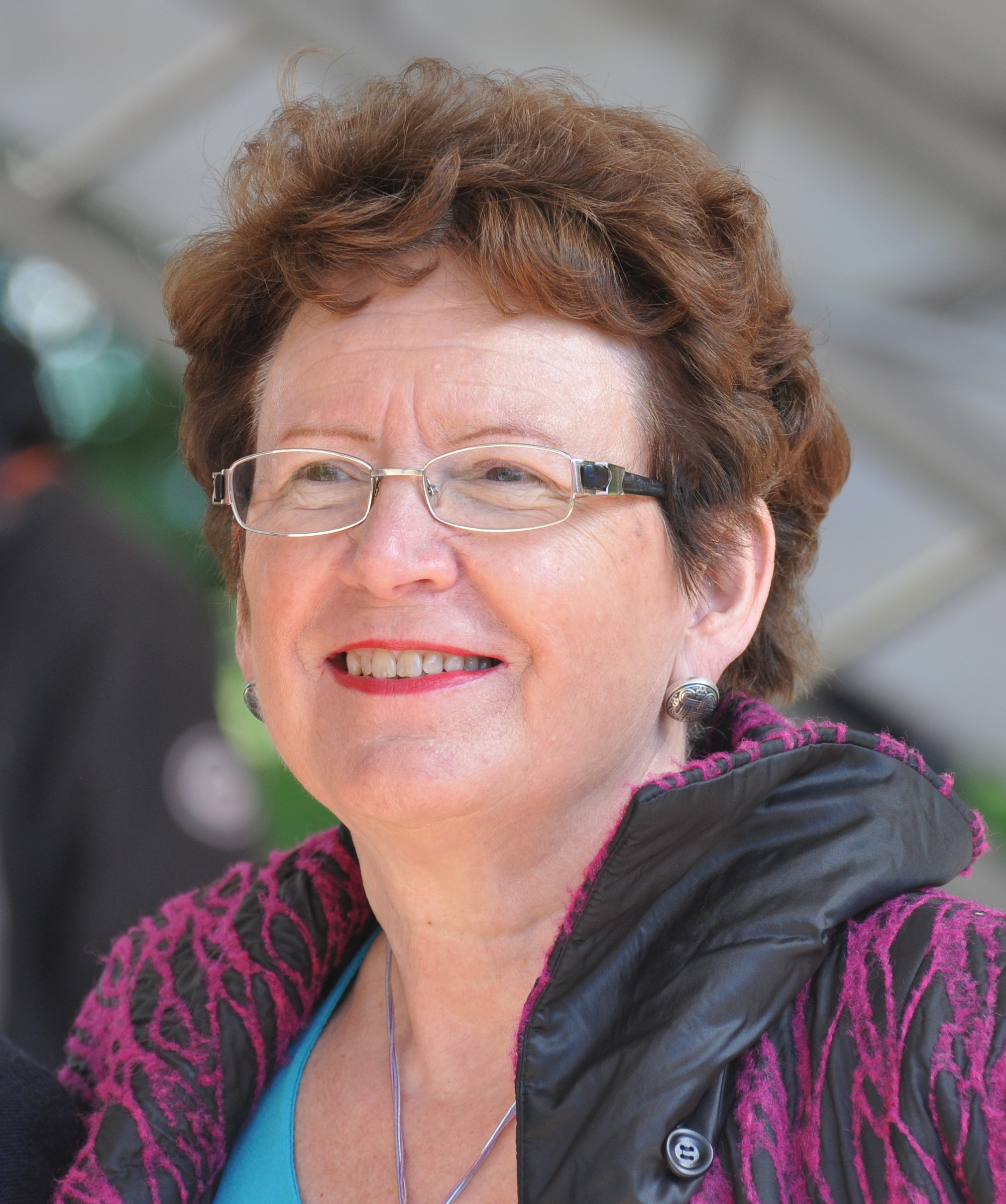
- Kuuskoski in 2013

Minister of Social Affairs and Health
- In office 6 May 1983 – 29 April 1987
- In office 26 April 1991 – 23 April 1992

Personal details
- Born: October 4, 1946 (age 79) Aura, Finland
- Party: National Coalition Party (before 1980); Centre Party (since 1980)

Eeva Maija Kaarina Kuuskoski (born 4 October 1946) is a Finnish politician and physician. She was Member of the Parliament of Finland for Finland Proper from 1979 to 1995 and Minister of Social Affairs and Health from 1983 to 1987 and again from 1991 to 1992.

== Career ==
Kuuskoski worked as a physician before being elected to the Parliament in 1979. Initially a member of the National Coalition Party, she switched to the Centre Party in 1980. She ran for Leader of the Centre Party in 1990 but was defeated by Esko Aho. Kuuskoski resigned from the Aho Cabinet in 1992 to protest against public spending cuts. In 1994, she ran for President of Finland as an independent candidate, receiving 2.6 per cent of the popular vote in the first round.

In 1995, Kuuskoski left politics to work for the Mannerheim League for Child Welfare and was appointed its general secretary in 1998. In 2007, she was removed from office after she had been convicted of assaulting Helena Molander, an employee of the Mannerheim League. Since 2015, Kuuskoski has been chairwoman of the Pensioner Alliance.

== Personal life ==
In 1973, Kuuskoski married Member of Parliament Juha Vikatmaa who committed suicide next year. In 1991, she married journalist Pentti Manninen and gave birth to a daughter.
