= League of the Rural People of Finland =

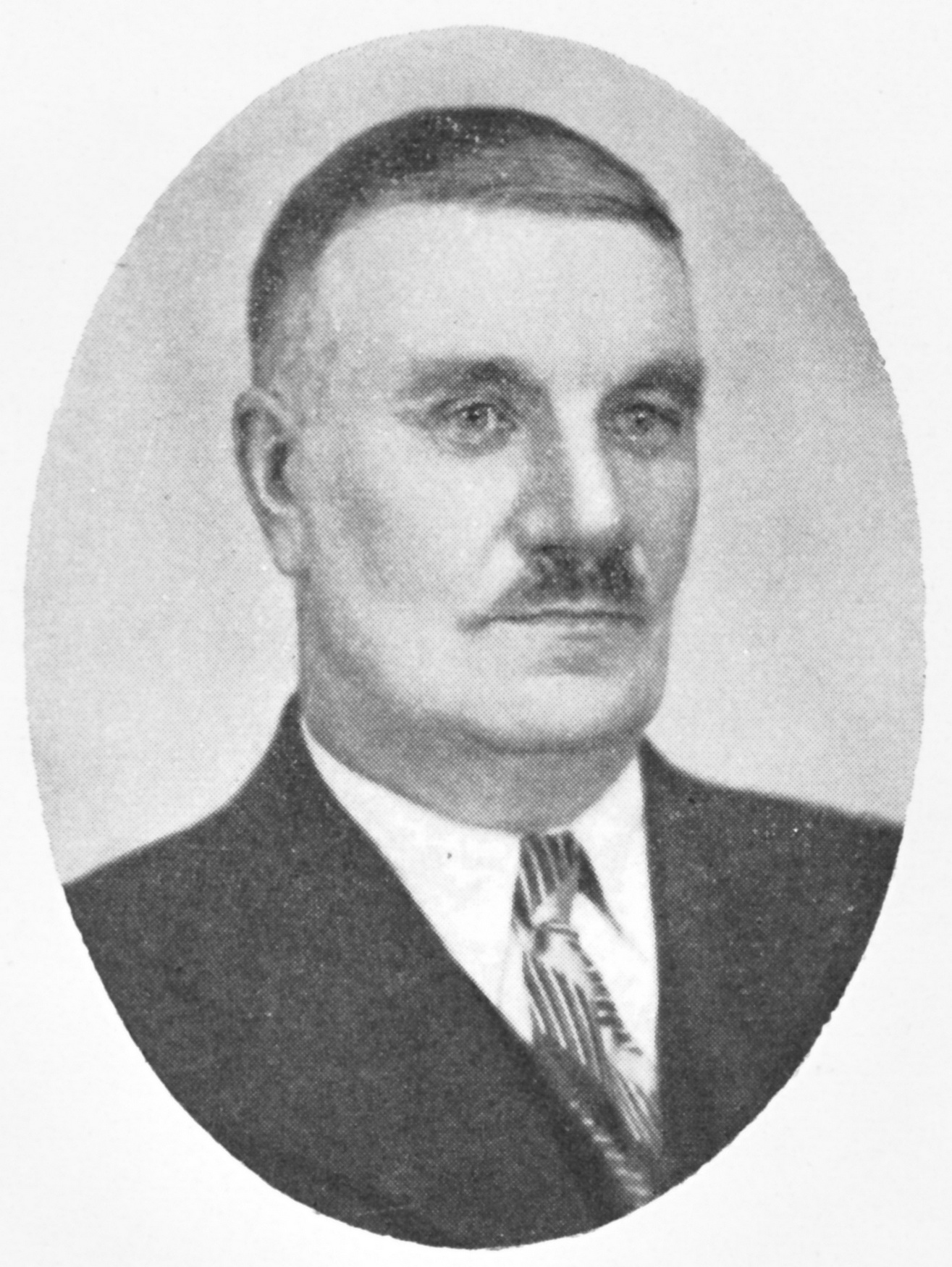
Chairman of The League of the Rural People of Finland

The League of the Rural People of Finland (also known as the Finnish Agrarian Party, Finnish: Suomen Maalaisväestön Liitto) was a political party, which was established in Oulu party meeting on 18–19 September 1906. Its chairman was Otto Karhi. In the next party meeting in Seinäjoki, 26–27 October 1906, the opener, Otto Karhi emphasized that the party is for defending the rights of the rural people. He said "Entisten puolueiden" johtajat olivat "erityisesti kaupunkilaisia, saha- ja tukkuliikkeiden johtajia, virkamiehiä, tehtailijoita ja kauppiaita, joiden kanssa maalaisväestön edut olivat ristiriidassa", (The leaders of the past parties are especially urban people, directors of the saw mills and gross trade companies, civil servants, mill owners and tradesmen, who has conflict of interests with the rural people.

Later the League of the Rural People of Finland and Young Finnish Agrarian League of the Southern Ostrobothnia merged and formed a new party Agrarian League in 1908 after the general elections of 1907 before the elections of 1908

Otto Karhi became later a Social Democrat as he had borrowed money from the society as a member of it which turned out to be Social Democratic.
