= Jussi Puumala =

Finnish farmer and politician

Jussi Heikki Puumala (20 December 1878 – 1 October 1953) was a Finnish farmer and politician. He was born in Noormarkku and was a member of the Parliament of Finland, representing the People's Party from 1917 to 1918 and the National Coalition Party from 1918 to 1919.
