= Ilkka Hakalehto =

Finnish historian and politician

Dr. Ilkka Matti Tapani Hakalehto (1936–2009) was a Finnish historian and politician.

Hakalehto was known as a principled eurosceptic, who held that the European Union actively threatened the independence of Finland. From 1994–2004, he served as the president of the Vapaan Suomen liitto party ("Free Finland association"), formed in response to Finland's accession to the European Union in 1994. He stood as the True Finns candidate in the presidential election of 2000, achieving 1% of the vote. From 1979 onward, he had a docenture in political history at the University of Helsinki. He was also a long time member of Helsinki city council, representing first Centre Party (1972–1987) and then as independent (1987–2004).
