= August Tanttu =

Finnish politician

August Tanttu (14 October 1859 in Hirvensalmi – 13 January 1937) was a Finnish farmer and politician. He was a member of the Parliament of Finland, representing several different parties over time: the Young Finnish Party from 1908 to 1910; the People's Party from 1917 to 1919; and the National Coalition Party from 1922 to 1924.
