= Timeline of Helsinki =

The following is a timeline of the history of the city of Helsinki, Finland.

== Prior to 19th century ==
- 1550 - Trading town established by Gustav I of Sweden.
- 1569 - City privileges granted.
- 1570 - Fire.
- 1616 - "Diet of Finland held in Helsinki."
- 1640 - Helsinki relocated across Kluuvinlahti bay to Vironniemi"
- 1654 - Fire.
- 1695 - Famine begins.
- 1710 - Plague.
- 1713 - Helsinki taken by Russian forces.
- 1727 - Ulrika Eleonora Church built.
- 1742 - Helsinki occupied by Russians again.
- 1743 - Herring fair begins.
- 1748 - Sveaborg fortress construction begins.
- 1757 - Sederholm house built.

== 19th century ==
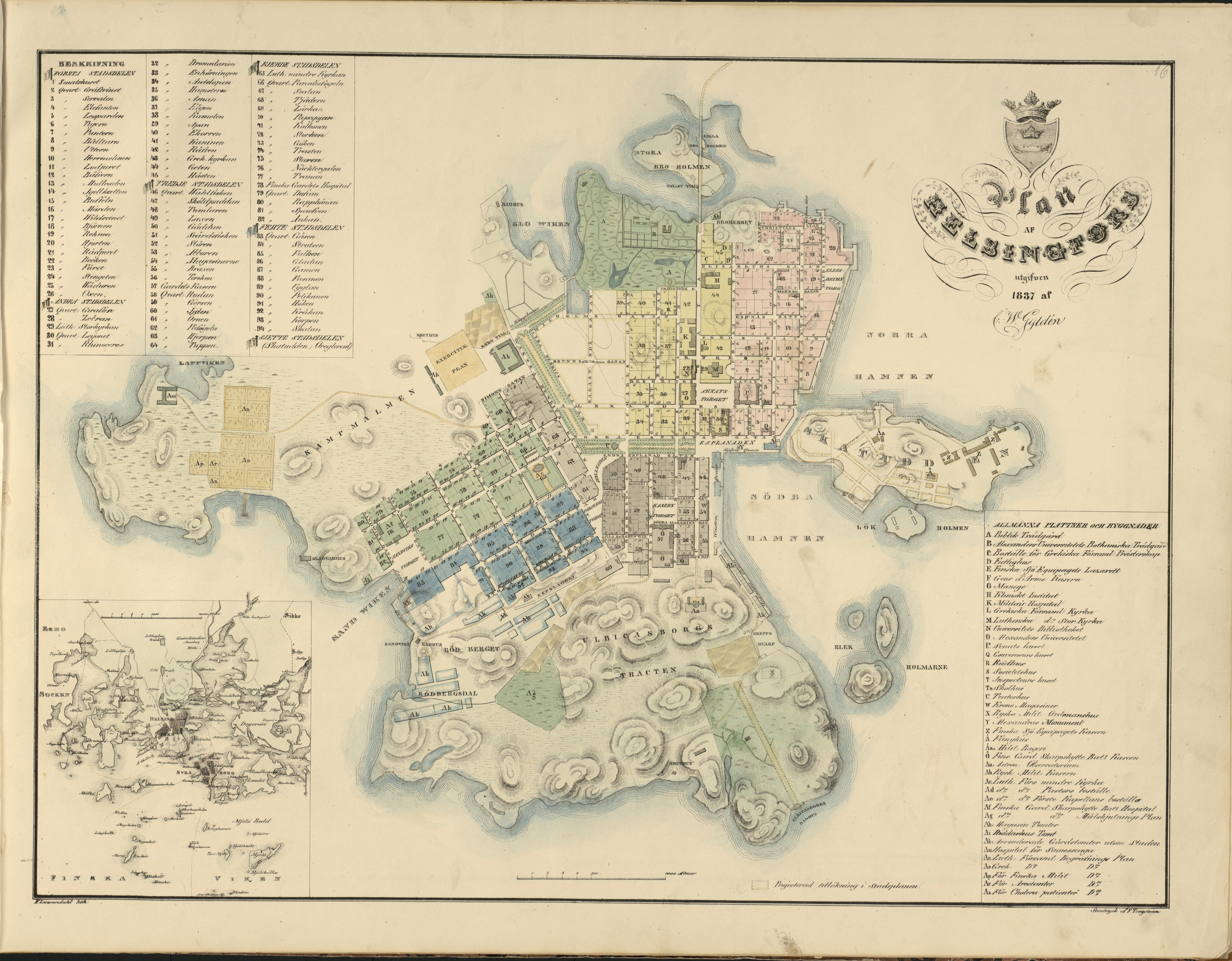
Map of Helsinki, 1837

- 1808
  - Suomenlinna fortress surrenders to Russia.
  - Fire.
- 1810 - Population: 4,065.
- 1812
  - Helsinki becomes capital of Grand Duchy of Finland.
  - Esplanadi park opens.
- 1815 - Helsinki Orthodox Cemetery established.
- 1819 - Sinebrychoff Brewery founded.
- 1822 - Government Palace built.
- 1826 - Helsinki Old Church built.
- 1827 - Engels Teater, the first theatre, is built.
- 1828 - The Royal Academy of Turku relocates to Helsinki.
- 1829 - Hietaniemi cemetery and University of Helsinki Botanical Garden established.
- 1838 - Kaivohuone built.
- 1844 - The state girls' school Svenska fruntimmersskolan i Helsingfors is opened.
- 1846 - Finnish Art Society and symphony orchestra founded.
- 1847 - Suometar newspaper begins publication.
- 1848 - Drawing school established.
- 1849 - Helsinki University of Technology founded.
- 1852
  - St Nicholas' Church built.
  - "Students Library" established.
- 1860
  - Swedish Theatre built.
  - Population: 22,228.
- 1862 - First Helsinki railway station opens with service to Hämeenlinna.
- 1864 - Hufvudstadsbladet newspaper begins publication.
- 1868 - Uspenski Cathedral built.
- 1870 - St. Petersburg-Helsinki railway built.
- 1871 - University of Arts and Design founded.
- 1872 - Helsinki typesetter strike of 1872.
- 1873 - First Finnish opera, Suomalainen Ooppera, is inaugurated.
- 1875 - City Council of Helsinki established.
- 1879 - Alexander Theatre built.
- 1881 - Rikhardinkatu Library opens.
- 1882
  - Helsinki Music Institute and Helsinki Philharmonic Orchestra established.
  - Population: 45,919.
- 1884 - Electric power plant begins operating.
- 1886 - Kaivopuisto park established.
- 1887 - Ateneum and Hotel Kämp built.
- 1888 - Kauppahalli built.
- 1889
  - Zoo opens.
  - Päivälehti and Helsingin Sanomat newspapers begin publication.
- 1890 - Population: 61,530.
- 1891
  - Horse-drawn tram begins operating.
  - Fazer in business.
- 1893
  - Helsinki harbour rail begins operating.
  - Winter garden opens.
- 1894 - Statue of Alexander II of Russia erected in Senate Square.
- 1895 - Demari newspaper begins publication.
- 1896 - Population: 77,484.
- 1898 - Kauppalehti newspaper in publication.
- 1900 - Electric tram begins operating.

== 20th century ==
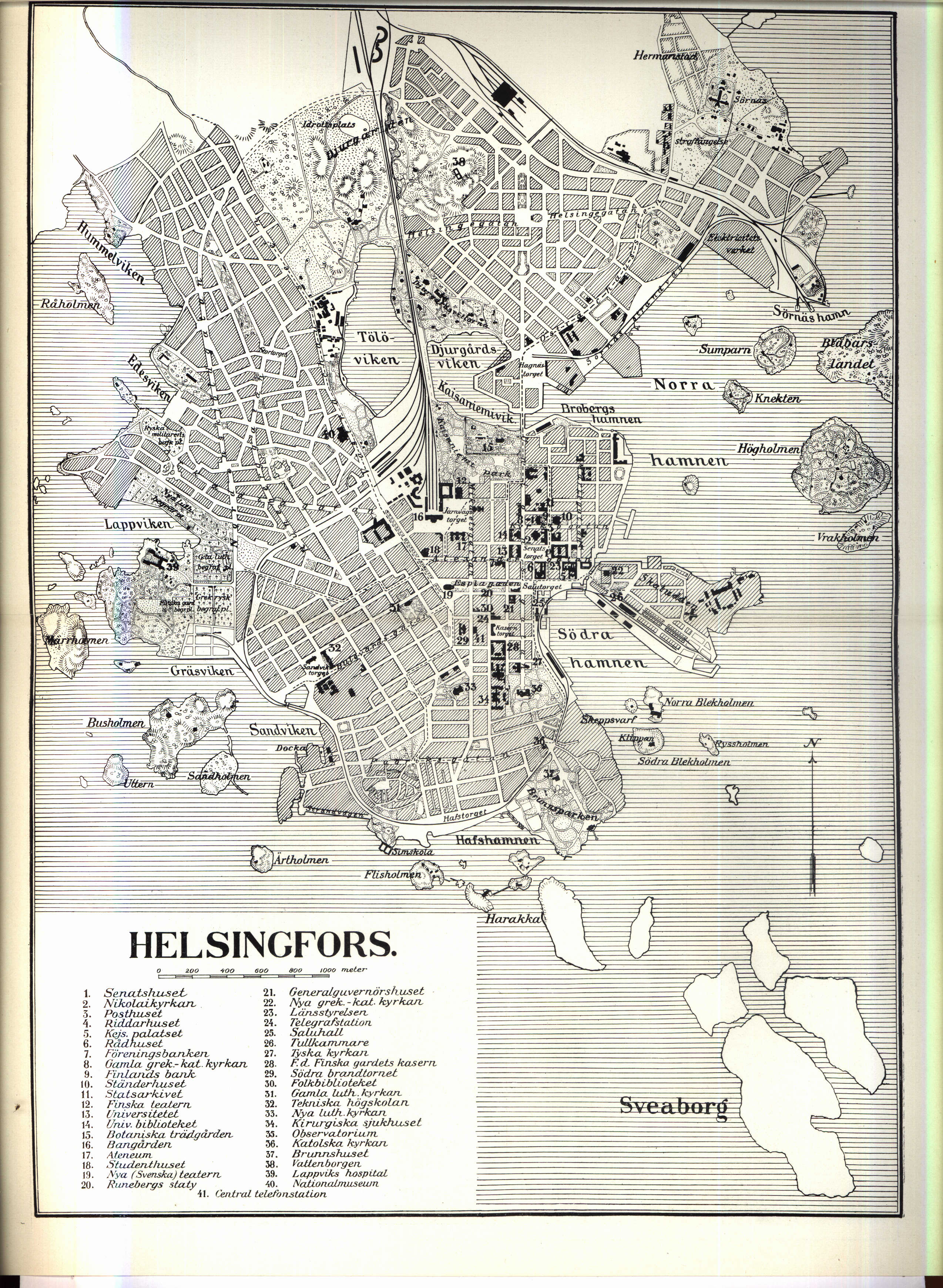
Map of Helsinki, c. 1900s

=== 1900s-1940s ===
- 1902 - Finnish National Theatre building constructed.
- 1904
  - Assassination of Governor-General Nikolai Bobrikov by Eugen Schauman.
  - Population: 111,654.
- 1906
  - 26 February: 1906 Helsinki bank robbery.
  - Helsinki Synagogue built.
- 1908 - Helsinki Workers' House built.
- 1909 - Seurasaari Open-Air Museum and Olympia cinema established.
- 1911
  - Helsinki School of Economics founded.
  - Domestic Opera founded.
  - Helsinki City Museum opens.
- 1912
  - Helsinki Stock Exchange founded.
  - Kallio Church inaugurated.
- 1917
  - May: 1917 Helsinki church riot occurs.
  - Helsinki Workers' Council formed.
- 1916 - National Museum of Finland opens.
- 1918
  - Civil war.
  - British submarine flotilla in harbor.
- 1919
  - 16 May: Victory day.
  - Helsinki Central railway station, designed by Eliel Saarinen, opens.
  - Population: 187,544.
- 1922 - Arthur Castrén becomes mayor.
- 1924 - Natural History Museum of Helsinki established.
- 1926
  - Yleisradio begins broadcasting.
  - Citizens' College Helsinki founded.
- 1928 - Merano cinema opens.
- 1930 - Population: 205,833.
- 1931
  - Antti Tulenheimo becomes mayor.
  - Parliament House built.
  - Hotel Torni opens.
- 1932
  - Eläintarhan ajot (motor race) begins.
  - Ilta-Sanomat newspaper begins publication.
- 1936 - Lasipalatsi built.
- 1937 - Savoy hotel founded.
- 1938
  - May: Second International Aeronautic Exhibition held.
  - Helsinki-Malmi Airport and Stadium open.
  - Klaus Kurki hotel established.
  - Tennispalatsi built.
- 1939 - Bombing by Soviets.
- 1944
  - Bombing by Soviets.
  - Eero Rydman becomes mayor.
- 1946 - Haaga, Huopalahti, Kulosaari, and Oulunkylä become part of city.
- 1947 - Helsinki Swimming Stadium built.

=== 1950s-1990s ===
- 1950
  - Linnanmäki amusement park opens.
  - Population: 368,519.
- 1951 - Marimekko founded.
- 1952
  - Helsinki Airport opens.
  - 1952 Summer Olympics held in Helsinki.
- 1956 - Lauri Aho becomes mayor.
- 1957 - Kansan Uutiset newspaper begins publication.
- 1960
  - Mosque established.
  - Lake Bodom murders occur.
- 1962
  - City hosts World Festival of Youth and Students.
  - Enzo-Gutzeit building constructed.
- 1964 - Orion (cinema) active.
- 1965
  - International Jean Sibelius Violin Competition begins.
  - Helsinki City Theatre established.
- 1966 - Helsinki Ice Hall opens.
- 1967 - Sibelius Monument unveiled.
- 1968
  - Teuvo Aura becomes mayor.
  - Helsinki Festival begins.
- 1969 - Temppeliaukio Church consecrated.
- 1970 - Helsinki Metropolitan Area Council created.
- 1971 - Finlandia Hall built.
- 1973 - Population: 510,614 city; 821,505 urban agglomeration.
- 1975
  - Helsinki Accords.
  - Helsinki Exhibition and Convention Centre built.
- 1979
  - Raimo Ilaskivi becomes mayor.
  - Lepakkoluola formed.
  - Helsinki Theatre Academy founded.
- 1980
  - Iltalehti newspaper begins publication.
  - Ring I highway constructed.
  - Population: 483,675.
- 1982
  - Helsinki Metro begins operating.
  - Sibelius Academy active.
- 1984 - Itäkeskus shopping mall built.
- 1986 - Mosque founded.
- 1989 - Night of the Arts begins.
- 1990 - Finnish National Gallery established.
- 1991
  - Linux software created by university student.
  - Kari Rahkamo becomes mayor.
- 1993
  - Helsinki Opera House opens.
  - National Defence College (Finland) established.
- 1995
  - Spårakoff pub tram begins operating.
  - Population: 515,765.
- 1996
  - Eva-Riitta Siitonen becomes mayor.
  - Helsinki Motor Show begins.
- 1997
  - Taloussanomat newspaper begins publication.
  - Hartwall Areena opens.
- 1998 - Kiasma museum inaugurated.
- 1999 - Finnkino Tennispalatsi (cinema) opens.

== 21st century ==
- 2002 - 11 October: Myyrmanni bombing occurs in nearby Vantaa.
- 2005 - Jussi Pajunen becomes mayor.
- 2007
  - Helsinki Metropolia University of Applied Sciences established.
  - Haaga-Helia University of Applied Sciences formed.
  - Eurovision Song Contest 2007 held.
- 2009
  - Helsinki Regional Transport Authority formed.
  - Kumpula Garden opens.
  - Prisma Itäkeskus shopping centre built.
- 2010 - Aalto University formed.
- 2011
  - Restaurant Day begins.
  - Sipoonkorpi National Park established.
  - Helsinki Music Centre built.
  - Helsinki Region Infoshare launched.
- 2012
  - Population: 596,233.
  - City designated World Design Capital.
- 2017
  - Jan Vapaavuori becomes mayor.
  - Länsimetro (western metro extension) opens.

== See also ==
- History of Helsinki
- Politics of Helsinki

== Bibliography ==
- "Helsingforss", Hand-book for Northern Europe, London: John Murray, 1849
- "Helsingfors", Hand-book for Travellers in Russia, Poland, and Finland (New ed.), London: John Murray, 1865
- "Helsingfors" . Encyclopædia Britannica. Vol. 13 (11th ed.). 1910. p. 252.
- "Helsinki: City With its Heart in the Country", National Geographic Magazine, vol. 160, Washington DC, 1981
- R.W. Apple Jr. (16 July 2006). "Helsinki's Shining Season". New York Times.
- Timo Hämäläinen [in Finnish] (23 June 2014), "Urbanist's guide to Helsinki", The Guardian, UK
- Erik Ehrström (1890), Helsingfors stads historia från 1640 till stora ofreden / Erik Ehrström., Skrifter utgivna av Svenska litteratursällskapet i Finland (in Swedish), Helsinki: Society of Swedish Literature in Finland, ISSN 0039-6842, Wikidata Q113383176
- Meinander, Henrik (2025). Helsinki: The History of a Nordic City. Translated by Robinson, Richard (1st ed.). La Vergne: C. Hurst and Company. ISBN 978-1-80526-458-3.
- P. Nordmann, Bidrag till Helsingfors stads historia [Contributions to Helsinki History], Skrifter utgifna af Svenska litteratursällskapet i Finland; 69, 72, 76, 82, 86 (in Swedish) – via HathiTrust 1905–1908, 5 vols.
  - Petrus Nordmann (1905), Bidrag till Helsingfors stads historia. 1 / samlade och utgifna af P. Nordmann., Skrifter utgivna av Svenska litteratursällskapet i Finland (in Swedish), Helsinki: Society of Swedish Literature in Finland, ISSN 0039-6842, Wikidata Q113394131
  - Petrus Nordmann (1906), Bidrag till Helsingfors stads historia. 2 / samlade och utgifna af P. Nordmann., Skrifter utgivna av Svenska litteratursällskapet i Finland (in Swedish), Helsinki: Society of Swedish Literature in Finland, ISSN 0039-6842, Wikidata Q65524878
  - Petrus Nordmann (1906), Bidrag till Helsingfors stads historia. 3 / samlade och utgifna af P. Nordmann., Skrifter utgivna av Svenska litteratursällskapet i Finland (in Swedish), Helsinki: Society of Swedish Literature in Finland, ISSN 0039-6842, Wikidata Q113394136
  - Petrus Nordmann (1908), Bidrag till Helsingfors stads historia. 4 / samlade och utgifna af P. Nordmann., Skrifter utgivna av Svenska litteratursällskapet i Finland (in Swedish), Helsinki: Society of Swedish Literature in Finland, ISSN 0039-6842, Wikidata Q113396126
  - Petrus Nordmann (1908), Bidrag till Helsingfors stads historia. 5, Gamla Helsingfors 1550-1640 / samlade och utgifna af P. Nordmann., Skrifter utgivna av Svenska litteratursällskapet i Finland (in Swedish), Helsinki: Society of Swedish Literature in Finland, ISSN 0039-6842, Wikidata Q113396159
- William Henry Overall, ed. (1870). "Helsingfors". Dictionary of Chronology. London: William Tegg. hdl:2027/uc2.ark:/13960/t9m32q949.
- I. Uschakoff, ed. (1898). "Helsinki". Suomi: hakemisto sisältävä maantieteellistilastollisia ja teollisuutta koskevia tietoja [Finland: Directory] (in Finnish). Helsinki: Weilin & Göös.
- Benjamin Vincent (1910), "Helsingfors, Finland", Haydn's Dictionary of Dates (25th ed.), London: Ward, Lock & Co., hdl:2027/loc.ark:/13960/t89g6g776
