= City Council of Helsinki =

Highest decision-making organ in Helsinki, Finland

City Council of Helsinki Helsingin kaupunginvaltuusto Helsingfors stadsfullmäktige

History
- Founded: 1873

Leadership
- Chairperson: Reetta Vanhanen, Green League
- First Deputy Chairperson: Wille Rydman, Finns Party
- Second Deputy Chairperson: Pilvi Torsti, Social Democratic Party

Structure
- Seats: 85
- Political groups: KOK (21); SDP (21); VIHR (16); VAS (15); PS (4); SFP (4); KESK (2); KD (1); LIIK (1)
- Length of term: 4 years

Elections
- Last election: April 13, 2025

Meeting place
- Helsinki City Hall

Website
- www.hel.fi/fi

Footnotes
- The seat distribution diagram presents the composition of the council right after the 2025 municipal election.

The City Council of Helsinki (Finnish: Helsingin kaupunginvaltuusto [ˈhelsiŋːin ˈkɑu̯puŋːinˌʋɑltuːsto], Swedish: Helsingfors stadsfullmäktige) is the main decision-making organ in the local politics of Helsinki, Finland. The City Council deals with issues such as city planning, schools, health care, and public transport.

The 85-seat Council's members are elected every four years in municipal elections. The seat of the Council is the Helsinki City Hall, which overlooks Market Square in central Helsinki.

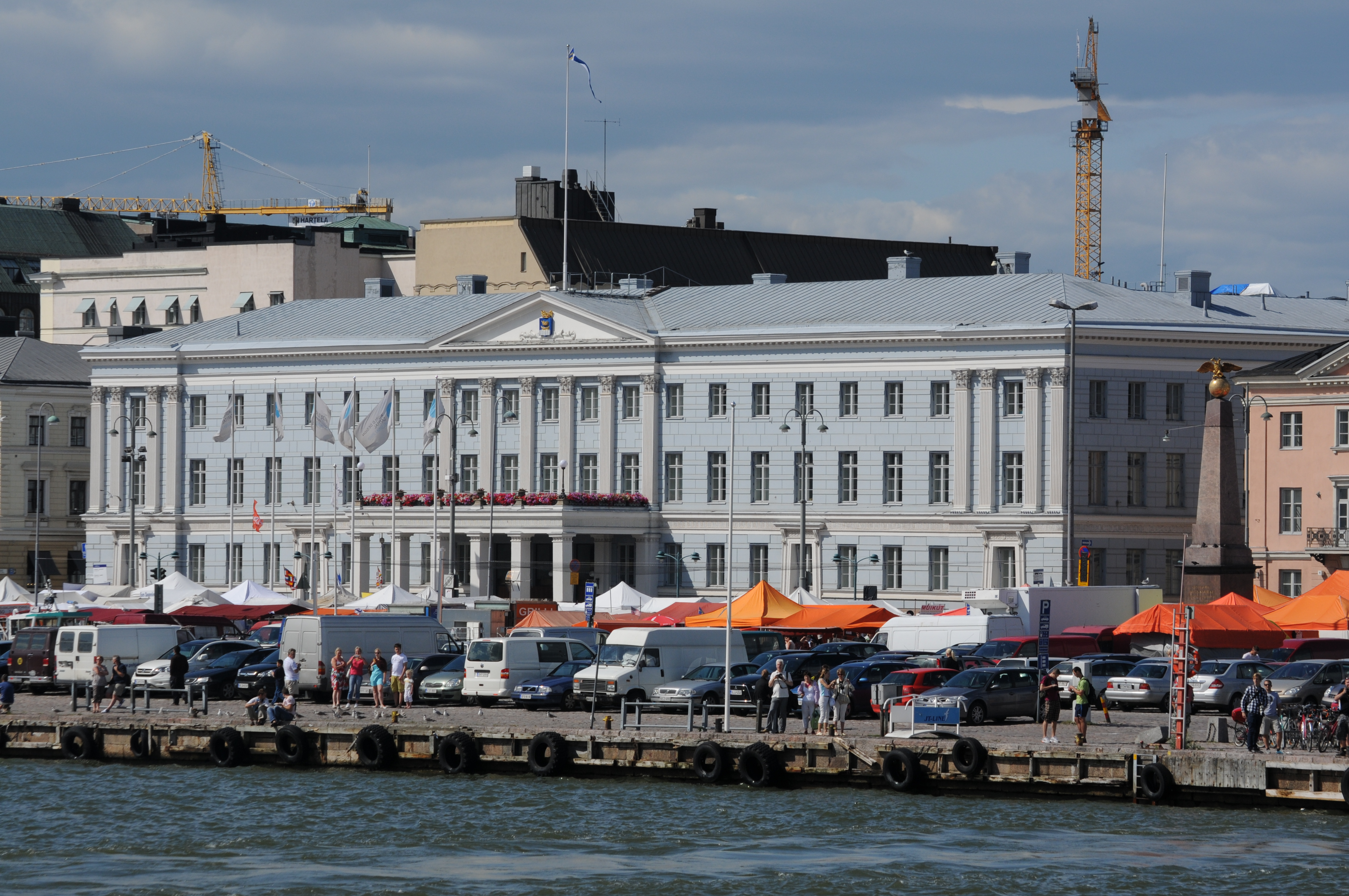
City Hall, the seat of the Helsinki City Council.

Historically, the center-right National Coalition Party has been the largest player in Helsinki's local politics, with the center-left Social Democratic Party being the second largest. However, since the 2000 elections, the position of the Social Democrats has been challenged by the Green League, for which Helsinki is the strongest area of support nationally, with the former party becoming the second-largest in only the 2008 elections. As of 2021, the second-largest and third-largest parties in the Council are the Green League and the Social Democrats respectively.

The Left Alliance is the Council's fourth-largest party while the Finns are the fifth-largest. The Swedish People's Party is sixth, with the party's support on a steady decline over the years; this can be attributed to the diminishing proportion of Swedish speakers in Helsinki. The agrarian Centre Party, despite being one of the major parties in national politics, has limited support in Helsinki. .

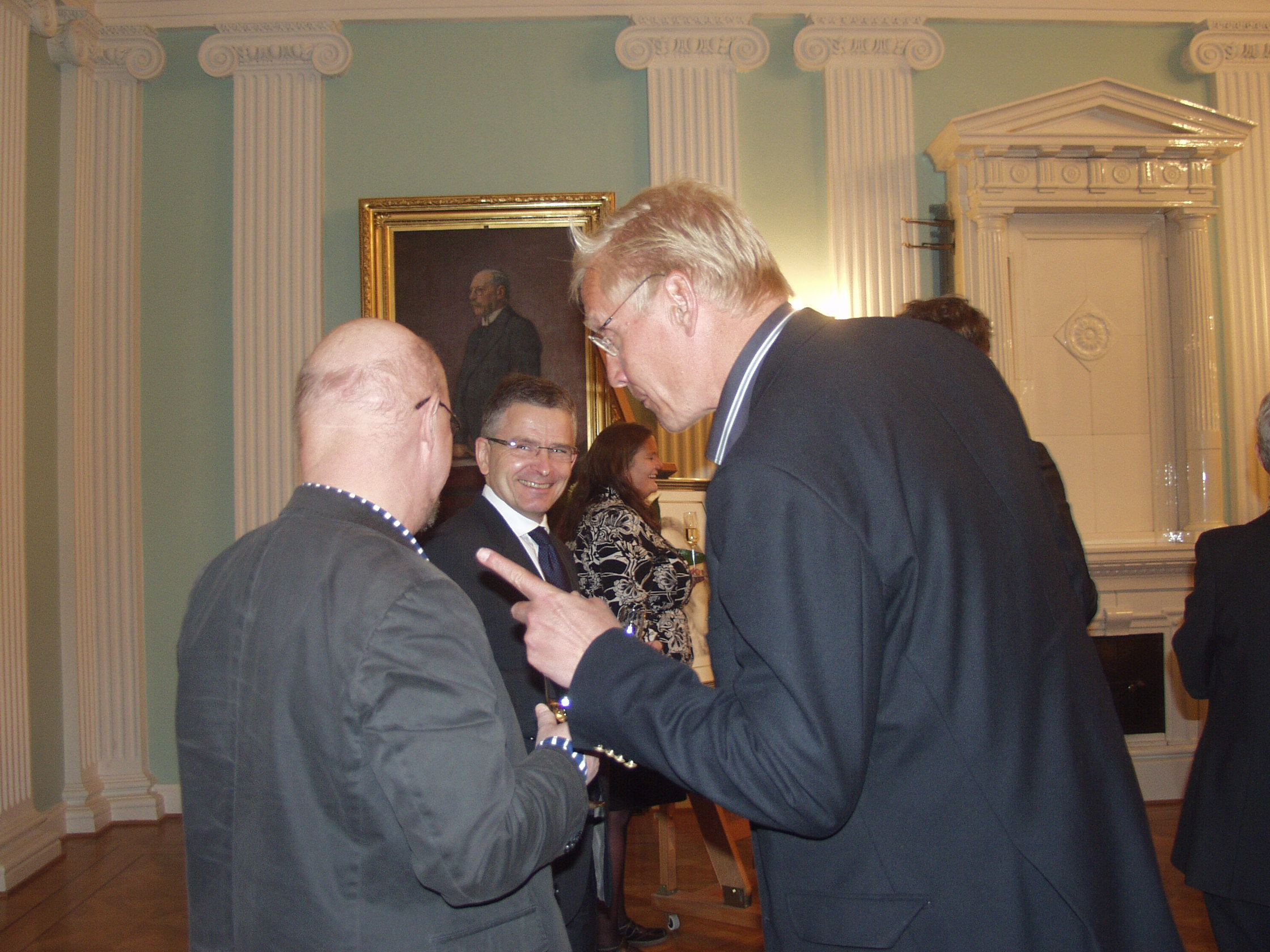
Former Helsinki City Manager Jussi Pajunen (center) with former leading City Council members Chairman Minerva Krohn (background), Osmo Soininvaara (left), and Arto Bryggare (right). Portrait of former chairman Alfred Norrmén on the wall.

== Seat distribution in the Council ==
=== 1919–1936 ===
Elections	Seats						
Elections	SDP	RKP	NCP	NPP	SWPF; SM	Other	Total
1918	26	22	8	4			60
1919	24	22	8	2	4		60
1920	20	22	7	3	8		60
1921	15	21	8	3	13		60
1922	12	22	9	3	14		60
1923	11	23	10	3	13		60
1924	11	24	11	3	11		60
1925	12	20	11	4	9	3	59
1928	13	18	9	5	10	4	59
1930	22	16	13	4		4	59
1933	23	15	11	6		4	59
1936	24	15	12	5		3	59
Source: Helsinki City Statistics

=== 1945– ===
Elections	Seat															Voter turnout %
Elections	NCP	SDP	FPDL; Left	RKP	NPP	CDP; KD	Centre	SMP; Finns	CRP; CPP	Greens	H2000	Independents	Communist	Other	Total	Voter turnout %
1945	14	11	15	12	6									1	59	
1947	15	15	11	12	5									1^{a}	59	
1950	16	19	15	13	8										71	
1953	15	18	15	13	10										71	
1956	18	19	15	14	11										77	
1960	21	16	15	13	9									3	77	
1964	21	21	14	11	7									3	77	
1968	21	21	11	10	8	--	1	4						1^{b}	77	
1972	21	25	12	9	6	2	1	1							77	
1976	22	22	15	10	6	3	3	--	4					--	85	
1980	28	23	14	7	3	3	2	1	3	1^{c}					85	
1984	26	19	9	8		3	2	3	2	7	4			2^{d}	85	
1988	27	21	7	8	--	2	4	1	1	7	3			4^{e}	85	
1992	21	21	7	8	1	2	3	--	1^{f}	15	4	2		--	85	
1996	24	21	6	8	--	2	3	--		16		1		4^{g}	85	
2000	25	18	7	6		3	4			21		1	--	--	85	
2004	25	21	8	6	--	2	4	1		17			1	--	85	57.1 %
2008	26	16	7	5		2	3	4		21			1	--	85	58.9 %
2012	23	15	9	5		2	3	8		19			1	--	85	57.4 %
2017	25	12	10	5		2	2	6		21				2^{h}	85	61.8 %
2021	23	13	11	5		1	2	9		18				3^{i}	85	61.7 %
2025	21	21	15	4		1	2	4		16				1^{i}	85	61.1 %
^{a} Radical People's Party^{b} Social Democratic Union of Workers and Smallholders^{c} Helsinki Movement (Ville Komsi)^{d} Democratic Helsinki Movement^{e} Democratic Alternative (2 councilors), Citizens Movement (2 councilors)^{f} Constitutional Right^{g} Young Finns^{h} Feminist Party (1 councilor), Pirate Party (1 councilor)^{i} Movement Now
Source: Statistics Bureau of Finland, Ministry of Justice, & Helsinki City Statistics

== Chairmen of the City Council ==
- Leo Mechelin (1875–1878)
- A. W. Liljenstrand (1877)
- J. A. Estlander (1879–1880)
- Lorenz Leonard Lindelöf (1881–1882)
- M. W. af Schultén (1883–1887)
- J. W. Runeberg (1888–1891)
- Leo Mechelin (1892–1899) (2nd time)
- P. K. S. Antell (1900–1903)
- Alfred Norrmén (1904–1918)
- Alexander Frey (1919–1920)
- Arthur Söderholm (1922)
- Leo Ehrnrooth (1923–1925)
- Antti Tulenheimo (1926–1928)
- Ivar Lindfors (1929–1934)
- Yrjö Harvia (1934–1936)
- Eero Rydman (1937–1944)
- Eino Tulenheimo (1945–1950)
- Konsti Järnefelt (1951)
- Lauri Aho (1952–1956)
- Teuvo Aura (1957–1968)
- Jussi Saukkonen (1969–1972)
- Pentti Poukka (1973–1979)
- Gustaf Laurent (1980)
- Harri Holkeri (1981–1987)
- Kari Rahkamo (1987–1991)
- Erkki Heikkonen (1991–1992)
- Arja Alho (1993–1994)
- Suvi Rihtniemi (1995–2000)
- Pekka Sauri (2001–2003)
- Minerva Krohn (2003–2004)
- Rakel Hiltunen (2005–2008)
- Otto Lehtipuu (2009–2011)
- Minerva Krohn (2011–2012)
- Mari Puoskari (2013–)

=== Deputy Chairman ===
- Väinö Tanner (1929-1930)
- Johan Helo
- Pekka Railo
- Tyyne Leivo-Larsson (1948-1956)
- B. R. Nybergh (1951-1954)
- Gunnar Modeen (1954-1964)
- Yrjö Rantala (1957-1972)
- Leo Backman (1965-1967)
- Carl-Gustaf Londen (1967-1974)
- Keijo Liinamaa (1973-1976)
- Gustaf Laurent (1974-1980)
- Per-Erik Förars (1977-1979)
- Arvo Salo (1979-1980)
- Grels Teir
- Jyrki Lohi (1989-1992)
- Ulla Gyllenberg (1989-1992)
- Outi Ojala (1993-1994)
- Erkki Heikkonen (1993-1995)
- Ulla Gyllenberg (1994-1998)
- Per-Erik Förars (1995-1996)
- Tuula Haatainen (1997-2000)
- Tuija Brax (1998-2000)
- Hannele Luukkainen (2000)
- Suvi Rihtniemi (2001-2004)
- Arto Bryggare (2001-2004)
- Harry Bogomoloff (2005-)
- Minerva Krohn (2005-2008)
- Rakel Hiltunen (2009–2012)
- Sara Paavolainen (2013–)

== City Manager ==
The City Manager of Helsinki was appointed by the Council. The last holder of the post was Jussi Pajunen. He was appointed for two 7-year terms, starting 1 June 2005. Pajunen was a member of the Council for 8 years, and was the chairman of the city board in 2003–2005. According to local media, the three biggest parties in the council had agreed in the wake of the October 2004 municipal election that the mayor's seat would go to the National Coalition Party. The position of City Manager was abolished in June 2017 and the position of Mayor was created.

=== List of city managers of Helsinki ===
Image	City Manager	Term	Party
	Arthur Castrén	1921–1930	Young Finnish Party
	Antti Tulenheimo	1931–1944	National Coalition Party
	Eero Rydman	1944–1956	National Progressive Party
	Lauri Aho	1956–1968	National Coalition Party
	Teuvo Aura	1968–1979	Liberal People's Party
	Raimo Ilaskivi	1979–1991	National Coalition Party
	Kari Rahkamo	1991–1996	National Coalition Party
	Eva-Riitta Siitonen	1996–2005	National Coalition Party
	Jussi Pajunen	2005–2017	National Coalition Party

== Mayor ==
The position of Mayor of Helsinki was created when the position of City Manager of Helsinki was abolished in June 2017. The incumbent mayor of Helsinki is Daniel Sazonov.

=== List of mayors of Helsinki ===
Image	Mayor	Term	Party
	Jan Vapaavuori	2017–2021	National Coalition Party
	Juhana Vartiainen	2021–2025	National Coalition Party
	Daniel Sazonov	2025–	National Coalition Party

== See also ==
- Timeline of Helsinki
