= Memorial Cross (Finland) =

Finnish service medals of the Second World War

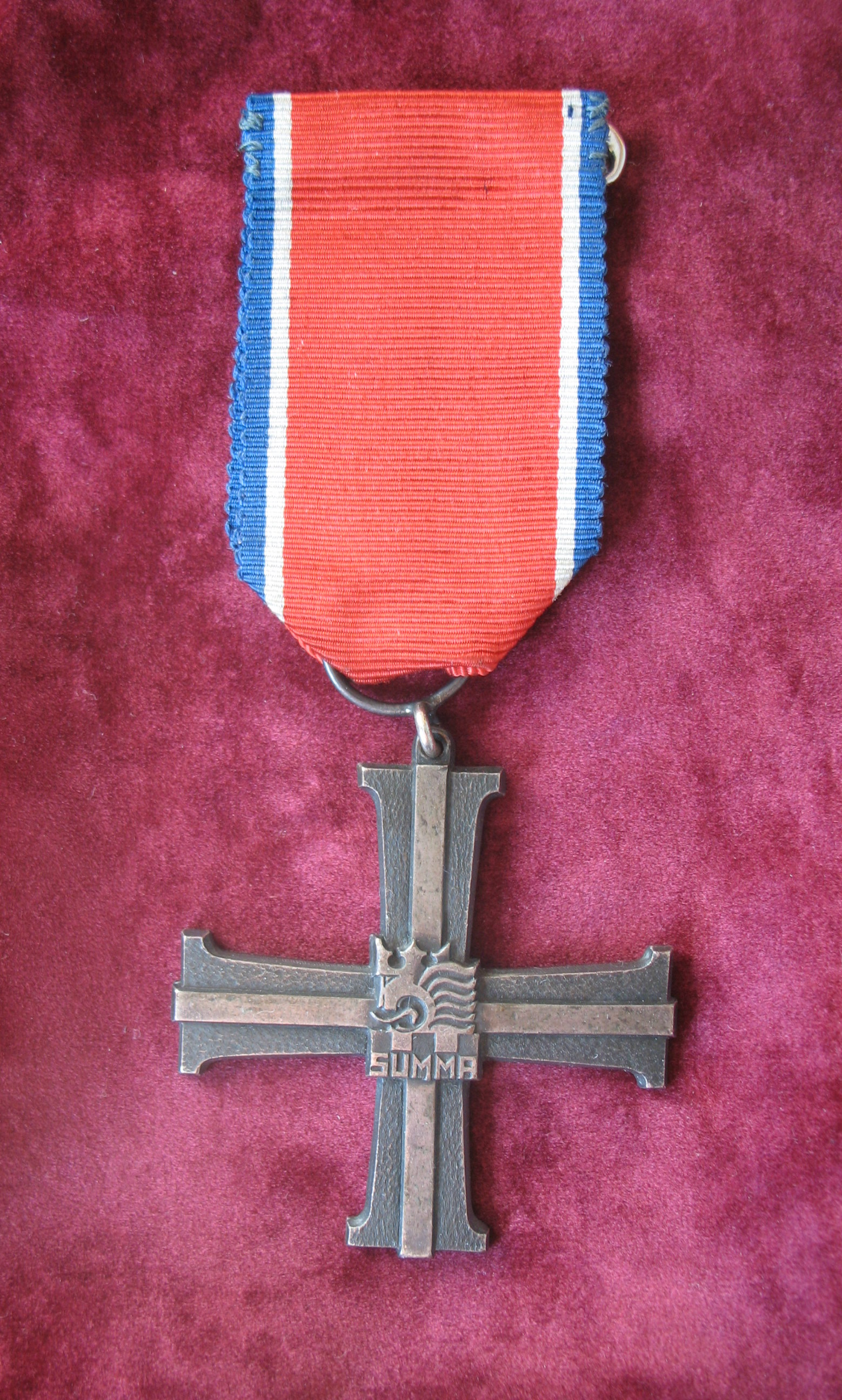
Summa Cross.

The Memorial Crosses (Muistoristi) are Finnish specific service medals of the Second World War, i.e. Winter War, Continuation War and Lapland War. They are official awards of Finland and shall be worn after the other official awards in chronological order, however preceding later campaign medals (e.g. different United Nations Medals) and other generic awards for patriotic duty.

The Memorial Crosses are awarded by Suomen sotien 1939–1945 muistoristitoimikunta ('Memorial Cross committee of the wars of Finland 1939–1945'), which is represented by the board of the Disabled War Veterans Association of Finland (Sotainvalidien veljesliitto). Before awarding a Memorial Cross, the board must first consult two verified veterans of said formation, or their representatives. A certificate is issued alongside the Memorial Cross, and the Memorial Cross committee maintains a list of awardees of each Memorial Cross.

== Winter War Memorial Crosses ==
In the Winter War Memorial Crosses were awarded based on participation in different sectors of the theatre. These are:

- Central Karelian Isthmus Cross (Keski-Kannaksen risti, abbr. K-Kann mr)
- Kainuu Cross (Kainuun risti, abbr. Kain mr)
- Koivisto Cross (Koiviston risti, abbr. Koiv mr)
- Kollaa Cross (Kollaan risti, abbr. Koll mr)
- Ladoga Medal (Laatokan mitali, abbr. Laat mr)
- Muolaa Cross (Muolaan risti, abbr. Muol mr)
- Pitkäranta Cross (Pitkärannan risti, abbr. Pitk mr)
- Summa Cross (Summan risti, abbr. Summan mr)
- Taipale Cross (Taipaleen risti, abbr. Taip mr)
- Tolvajärvi Cross (Tolvajärven risti, abbr. Tolv mr)
- War in Lapland Memorial Cross (Lapin sodan muistoristi, abbr. Lap mr) - later also called Talvisodan Lapin muistoristi ('Winter War Lapland Memorial Cross').
- Western Karelian Isthmus Cross (Länsi-Kannaksen risti, abbr. L-Kann mr)

== Continuation War Memorial Crosses ==
In the Continuation War Memorial Crosses were awarded based on different formations. These are:

- 1st Division Memorial Cross (1. divisioonan muistoristi, abbr. 1. D mr)
- 4th Division Memorial Cross (4. divisioonan muistoristi, abbr. 4. D mr)
- 6th Division Memorial Cross (6. divisioonan muistoristi, abbr. 6. D mr)
- 10th Division Memorial Cross (10. divisioonan muistoristi, abbr. 10. D mr)
- 12th Division Memorial Cross (12. divisioonan muistoristi, abbr. 12. D mr)
- 15th Brigade Memorial Cross (15. prikaatin muistoristi, abbr. 15. Pr mr)
- 18th Division Memorial Cross (18. divisioonan muistoristi, abbr. 18. D mr)
- 19th Division Memorial Cross (19. divisioonan muistoristi, abbr. 19. D mr)
- Armoured Division Cross (Panssaridivisioonan risti, abbr. PsD mr)
- Blue Brigade Memorial Cross (Sinisen prikaatin muistoristi, abbr. 3. Pr mr) - Memorial Cross of the 3rd Brigade.
- Breacher Division Memorial Cross (Murtajadivisioonan muistoristi, abbr. 2. D mr) - Memorial Cross of the 2nd Division.
- Brigade K Memorial Cross (Prikaati K:n risti, abbr. Pr K mr) - Memorial Cross of the Group Kuussaari.
- Continuation War Lapland Memorial Cross (Jatkosodan Lapin muistoristi, abbr. Js Lapin mr) - Memorial Cross of the Yhteysesikunta Roi.
- Eastern Karelian Isthmus Cross (Itä-Kannaksen risti, abbr. I-Kann mr) - Memorial Cross of the 15th Division and 19th Brigade.
- Eastern Svir Cross (Itä-Syvärin risti, abbr. I-Syv mr) - Memorial Cross of the 5th Corps HQ and direct subordinate units.
- Group O – RvPr Memorial Cross (Ryhmä O – RvPr:n muistoristi, abbr. RO-RvPr mr) - Memorial Cross of the Cavalry Brigade and Group Oinonen.
- Karelian Isthmus Cross (Kannaksen risti, abbr. Kann mr) - Memorial Cross of the 4th Corps and Karelian Isthmus HQs and direct subordinate units.
- Lynx Division Memorial Cross (Ilvesdivisioonan muistoristi, abbr. 5. D mr) - Memorial Cross of the 5th Division.
- Maaselkä Memorial Cross (Maaselän muistoristi, abbr. Maas mr) - Memorial Cross of the 2nd Corps HQ and direct subordinate units.
- Northern White Karelia Cross (Pohjois-Vienan risti, abbr. P-Vien mr) - Memorial Cross of the 3rd Corps HQ and direct subordinate units.
- Oak Division Memorial Cross (Tammidivisioonan muistoristi, abbr. 17. D mr) - Memorial Cross of the 17th Division.
- Olonets Cross (Aunuksen risti, abbr. Aun mr) - Memorial Cross of the 6th Corps HQ and direct subordinate units.
- Onega Memorial Cross (Äänisen muistoristi, abbr. Ään mr) - Memorial Cross of the 7th Corps HQ and direct subordinate units.
- Outflankers of the Three Isthmuses' Memorial Cross (Kolmen Kannaksen Koukkaajien risti, abbr. 8. D mr) - Memorial Cross of the 8th Division.
- Rukajärvi Memorial Cross (Rukajärven muistoristi, abbr. 14. D mr) - Memorial Cross of the 14th Division and Group Raappana.
- Sword Cross (Kalparisti, abbr. 7. D mr) - Memorial Cross of the 7th Division.
- Spearhead Cross (Kiilaristi, abbr. 11. D mr) - Memorial Cross of the 11th Division.

== Winter and Continuation War Memorial Crosses ==
Several Memorial Crosses were awarded in both Winter and Continuation Wars. These are:

- Air Force Memorial Cross (Ilmavoimien muistoristi, abbr. Ilmav mr )
- Border Jaeger Units' Memorial Cross (Rajajääkärijoukkojen muistoristi, abbr. Rajajj mr)
- Coastal Troops Memorial Cross (Rannikkojoukkojen muistoristi, abbr. Rann mr)
- Engineer Cross (Pioneeriristi, abbr. Pion mr)
- Headquarters' Memorial Cross (Päämajan muistoristi, abbr. PM mr)
- Homefront Memorial Cross (Kotijoukkojen muistoristi, abbr. Kotij mr)
- Homefront Women's Medal (Kotirintamanaisten mitali, abbr. Kotir.n. mr)
- Karelia Cross (Karjalan risti, abbr. Karj mr)
- Navy Memorial Cross (Laivaston muistoristi, abbr. Laiv mr)
- War Railroad Formations' Cross (Sotarautatiemuodostelmien risti, abbr. SRaut mr)
