= Jussi Pajunen =

Finnish politician

Ylipormestari (High Mayor) Jussi Pajunen
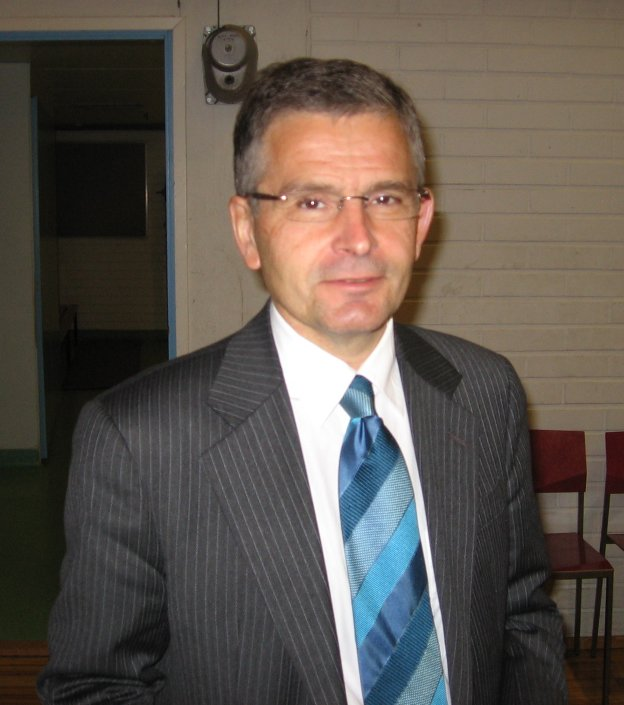

City Manager of Helsinki
- In office 1 June 2005 – 7 June 2017
- Preceded by: Eva-Riitta Siitonen
- Succeeded by: Jan Vapaavuori (as mayor)

Personal details
- Born: 5 September 1954 (age 72) Helsinki, Finland
- Party: National Coalition Party
- Spouse: Jaana Pajunen
- Education: Helsinki School of Economics; INSEAD

Jussi Ilmari Pajunen (born 5 September 1954 in Helsinki) is a Finnish politician of the National Coalition Party and former city manager of Helsinki.

Prior to this appointment, Pajunen served as a member of the City Council in 1997–2005, and became a member of the City Board in 1999. In 2003 he assumed the position of Chairman of the City Board, holding it until his appointment as City Manager of Helsinki.

As City Manager, Pajunen was closely involved in Helsinki's bid to become World Design Capital in 2012 under the theme "Open Helsinki".

== Early life and career ==
Jussi Pajunen has a B.Sc and M.Sc from the Helsinki School of Economics and MBA from INSEAD in France. He speaks Finnish, Swedish, English, and French fluently. In 2011, he was awarded an honorary doctorate from the Aalto University School of Economics. He was granted the honorary title of ylipormestari (Swedish: överborgmästare) by the Finnish president in 2006.

Before assuming his duties as City Manager of Helsinki, Jussi Pajunen worked as Managing Director and as Chairman of the Board of the family firm Edvard Pajunen Ltd.

Pajunen was earlier a member of the Liberal Party and a small group known as Reform Party Liberals. He moved to the larger National Coalition Party in 1996.

Jussi Pajunen is married and has five adult children.

== Helsinki Master Plan 2002 and the judicial disqualification ==
While serving as a member and a chairman of the City Board, Pajunen was also a chairman of the board in a private real estate company Malmin Nova. However Pajunen did not disqualify himself when the Master Plan 2002 was approved in the City Board on 26 November 2005. The Supreme Administrative Court of Finland judicially disqualified Pajunen and the part of the Master Plan that would have had significant effect in the Malmi area was reverted.

== See also ==
- Timeline of Helsinki, 2000s–present
