= Juhana Vartiainen =

Finnish politician (born 1958)

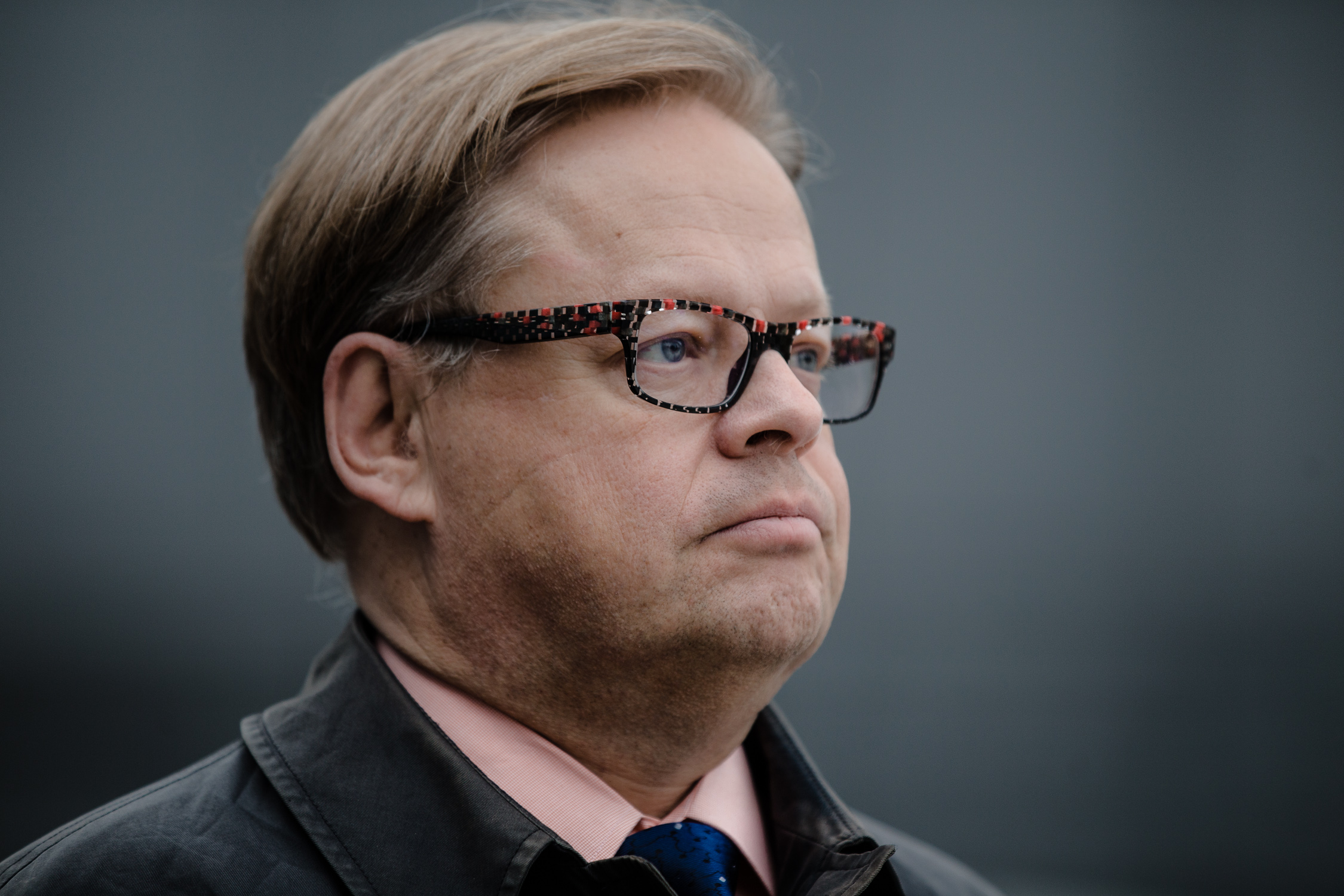

2nd Mayor of Helsinki
- In office 2 August 2021 – 2 June 2025
- Preceded by: Jan Vapaavuori
- Succeeded by: Daniel Sazonov

Member of the Finnish Parliament
- In office 22 April 2015 – 7 September 2021

Personal details
- Born: Juhana Mikael Vartiainen; 28 May 1958 (age 68) Helsinki, Finland
- Party: National Coalition Party (2015–present); Social Democratic Party (1975–2015)
- Education: University of Helsinki; Doctor of Social Sciences (1992)

Juhana Mikael Vartiainen (born 28 May 1958) is a Finnish politician, economist and a member of the Finnish Parliament, representing the National Coalition Party, which he joined after having been a member of the Social Democratic Party of Finland from 1975 to 2015. He was elected the Mayor of Helsinki in August 2021 by the Helsinki city council.

== Early life and education ==
Vartiainen was born in Helsinki and according to Vartiainen, he was raised in a Christian environment. Both of Vartiainen's parents were Karelian refugees, his father being born and raised in Ladogan-Karelian Sortavala and his mother being born in 1931 in Viipuri. Vartiainen's family included himself and three sisters. Vartiainen's father Henri Vartiainen was an economist and economic researcher. Vartiainen completed his mandatory military service in Finland and his current rank in the reserve is lieutenant. Vartiainen joined the Social Democratic Party of Finland in 1975. Vartiainen studied economics, other social sciences and philosophy at the University of Helsinki, earning his Doctorate of Social Sciences in Economics in 1992.

== Career before politics ==
Throughout his career, Vartiainen has worked in Helsinki and Stockholm, Sweden. He worked as an adjunct research assistant at the Academy of Finland Research Council for Culture and Society in 1984–1986. Between 1993 and 2005, Vartiainen worked as a researcher and senior researcher at the Finnish Labour Institute for Economic Research (Palkansaajien tutkimuslaitos). Between 2002 and 2005, Vartiainen worked at the Swedish Trade Union Institute for Economic Research as a researcher in 2002–2003 and as the Managing Director in 2003–2005. In 2005, Vartiainen became the Research Director of the Swedish National Institute of Economic Research (Konjukturinstitutet). Vartiainen worked at the Konjunkturinstitutet until 2012, when he became the Director General of the Finnish VATT Institute for Economic Research, an institution that produces and studies scientific research and analyses of micro- and macroeconomics as well as economic policy in Finland.

== Political career ==
Vartiainen left the Social Democratic Party of Finland in 2015, citing the party's movement further away from right-leaning social democracy (In Finnish: oikeistodemarius) and the inability of the party and the trade union movement to engage in the reforms needed to secure public finances in aging Finland.

Vartiainen was elected to the parliament in 2015 as a representative of the National Coalition Party from the Helsinki district, gaining 11,436 votes in the elections. He was re-elected in 2019 with 8,206 votes.

In 2021 Vartiainen was the National Coalition Party's mayoral candidate of Helsinki in the 2021 Finnish municipal elections, being elected to the city council of Helsinki with 13,898 votes, coming third in the personal vote share after fellow National Coalition Party candidate Elina Valtonen with 15,793 votes and the Finns Party's Jussi Halla-Aho at 18,978 votes. Vartiainen's National Coalition Party won the election in Helsinki, as Finland uses the d'Hondt voting method in parliamentary and municipal elections, with the party gathering a total of 25,6% of the total share of votes and 23 representatives out of a total of 85 in the city council. As expected, Vartiainen assumed the title of Mayor of Helsinki in August 2021, when the newly elected session of the city council began and the council chose a mayor, traditionally picked from the party with the largest share of representatives. Finnish politician, city council representative and researcher Atte Kaleva took the seat of Vartiainen in the Parliament of Finland when Vartiainen assumed the mayorship.

== Political views ==
Vartiainen describes himself as a "right-leaning social democrat" (in Finnish: oikeistodemari), following the footsteps of Finnish career politician Väinö Tanner.

Vartiainen supports work-based immigration to Finland.

Vartiainen does not support the Marin administration's social and healthcare reform law (in Finnish sote-uudistus), which he describes as counter-productive, cost-increasing and expensive.

== Other activities ==
- National Audit Office of Finland (NAOF), Member of the Advisory Board (2017-2019)
