= Ordo Sancti Constantini Magni =

International religious Christian Order

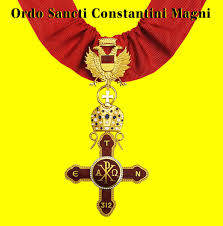
Badge of the Ordo Sancti Constantini Magni

Ordo Sancti Constantini Magni (post-nominals: OCM) (English: Order of Saint Constantine the Great) is an international, ecumenical, and religious Christian Order and knighthood under the auspices of the Patriarch and Pope Theodoros II of Alexandria and all Africa.

The Order was established in 1953 in Switzerland to commemorate the 500th anniversary of the Fall of Constantinople with most original knights hailing from Finland and Greece. Later, due to growth, the Order began establishing smaller 'exarchates' in various countries. The first two were established in Finland and Greece in 1978 and held their 40th anniversary conclaves in 2018.

It now operates in ten countries having members for example Russia and the United States.

In the aftermath of World War II, the Order sought to mitigate hardship brought on by the war. Since then, it has focused for example on famine and children in Africa and on locations in North Karelia.

Members tend to be of high in social standing. Honorary members include figures such as Finnish president Sauli Niinistö, Lutheran archbishops Jukka Paarma and John Vikström and Orthodox archbishops Leo and John as well as Russian Nobel Prize laureate Zhores Alferov.

Monotheistic belief is a requirement of membership. Theoretically, eligibility extends beyond ecumenism and includes Muslims as well. Women are allowed membership.

At the beginning of 2018, the Order had 491 full members in many European countries and the United States:

- Finland (248 knights)
- United States (79 knights)
- Sweden (63 knights)
- Greece (34 knights)
- Austria (29 knights)
- Norway (19 knights)
- Germany (10 knights)
- Czech Republic (9 knights)
- Diaspora (4 knights)

Additionally, there are 38 honorary members.

The insignias of the Order are divided into five classes:

- Grand Cross
- Grand Officer
- Commander
- Cross of Merit
- Medal of Merit

== Administration ==
The Patriarch of the Order is Patriarch and Pope Theodoros II of Alexandria and All Africa.

The Master of the Order is Friedrich, Duke and Prince of Beaufort-Spontin.

The Government was chaired 1999–2009 by the Chancellor Raimo Ilaskivi, and other members of the Executive Committee were the Vice Chancellor Hans-Olof Kvist, General Secretary Jürgen Schumacher and Treasurer Reino Koskinen.

On 21 May 2009 Raimo Ilaskivi was assigned by the Duke of Beaufort-Spontin (the Master), to be Deputy Master of the Order. The same day Jürgen Schumacher was chosen new Chancellor, Leif Syrstad Vice Chancellor and Jorma Ahonen Secretary General. Beaufort-Spontin also appointed George Haramis Ambassador of the Order to the Patriarchate. The Chairman of the Council is Rune Ryden.
