= Daniel Sazonov =

Finnish politician (born 1993)

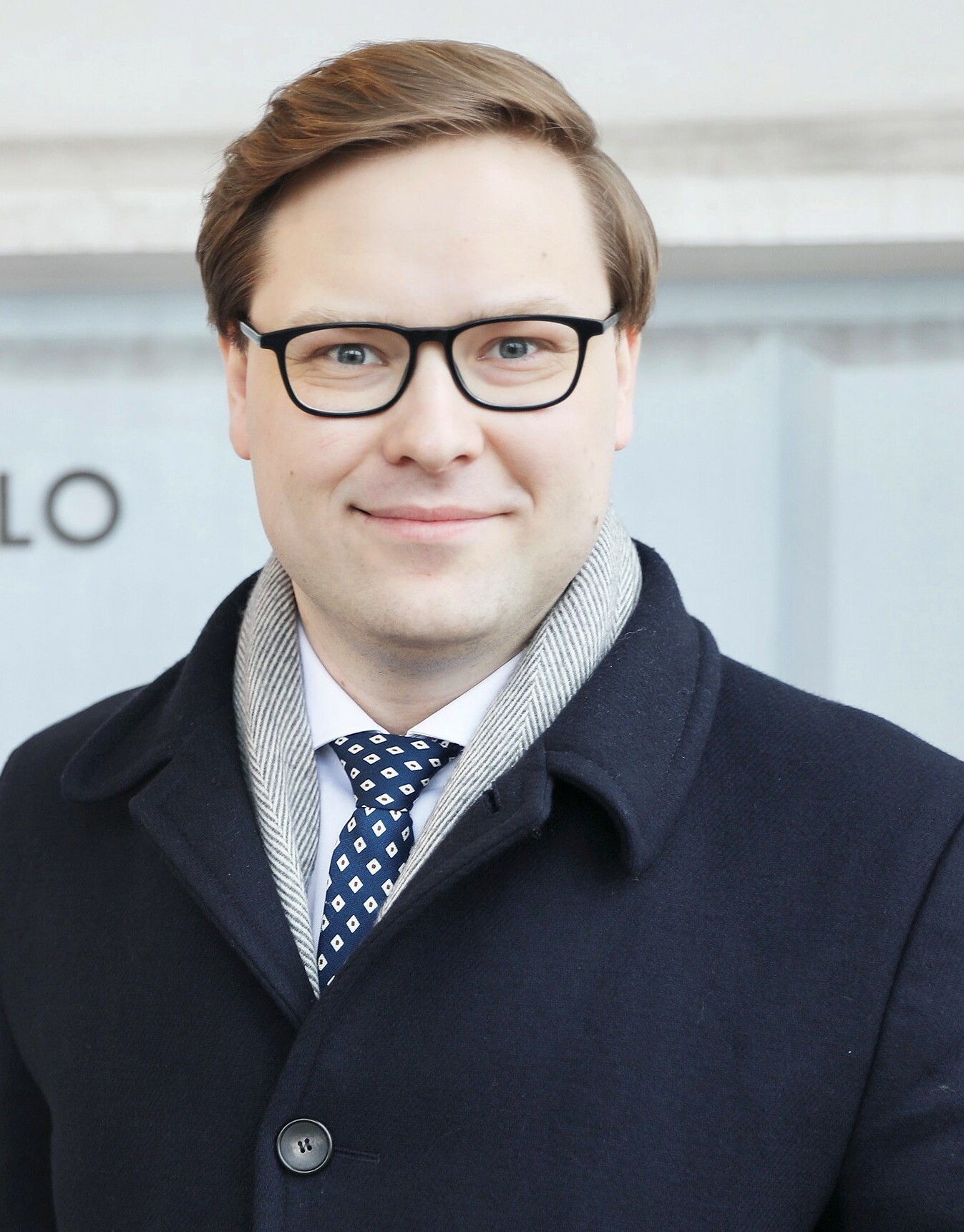
- Sazonov in 2023

3rd Mayor of Helsinki
- Incumbent
- Assumed office 2 June 2025
- Preceded by: Juhana Vartiainen

Personal details
- Born: Daniel Matti Mikael Sazonov; 24 March 1993 (age 33) Helsinki, Finland
- Party: National Coalition Party
- Occupation: Politician, lawyer
- Website: danielsazonov.fi

Daniel Matti Mikael Sazonov (born 24 March 1993) is a Finnish politician from the National Coalition Party. He has served as Deputy Mayor of Helsinki for Social Services, Health Care and Rescue Services since 2021. Sazonov has served as a Helsinki city councilor since 2017 and as a member of the city board since 2018. He served as the chairman of the National Coalition Party's council group in 2019–2021. He began his duties as Mayor of Helsinki in June 2025.

As Ingrian immigrants, Sazonov's parents came to Finland from Saint Petersburg in the early 1990s. He himself was born in Helsinki and grew up in the Malminkartano district. Sazonov graduated from Helsinki Finnish Co-educational School (SYK) in 2012. While in high school, he served as the chairman of the SYK teenage board and won an economic quiz for high school students in 2012. Sazonov graduated with a Master of Laws from the University of Helsinki in 2020.

Sazonov holds the military rank of lieutenant in the reserve and completed his military service in the Guard Jaeger Regiment. He speaks five languages; Finnish and Russian as his native language, and also English, German and Swedish. Sazonov has supported Finland's NATO membership since the 2015 parliamentary elections, in addition to which he has also criticized the current Russian government for scrapping the rules-based global system and supported the dismantling of the demilitarisation of the Åland Islands.
