= Raimo Ilaskivi =

Finnish politician

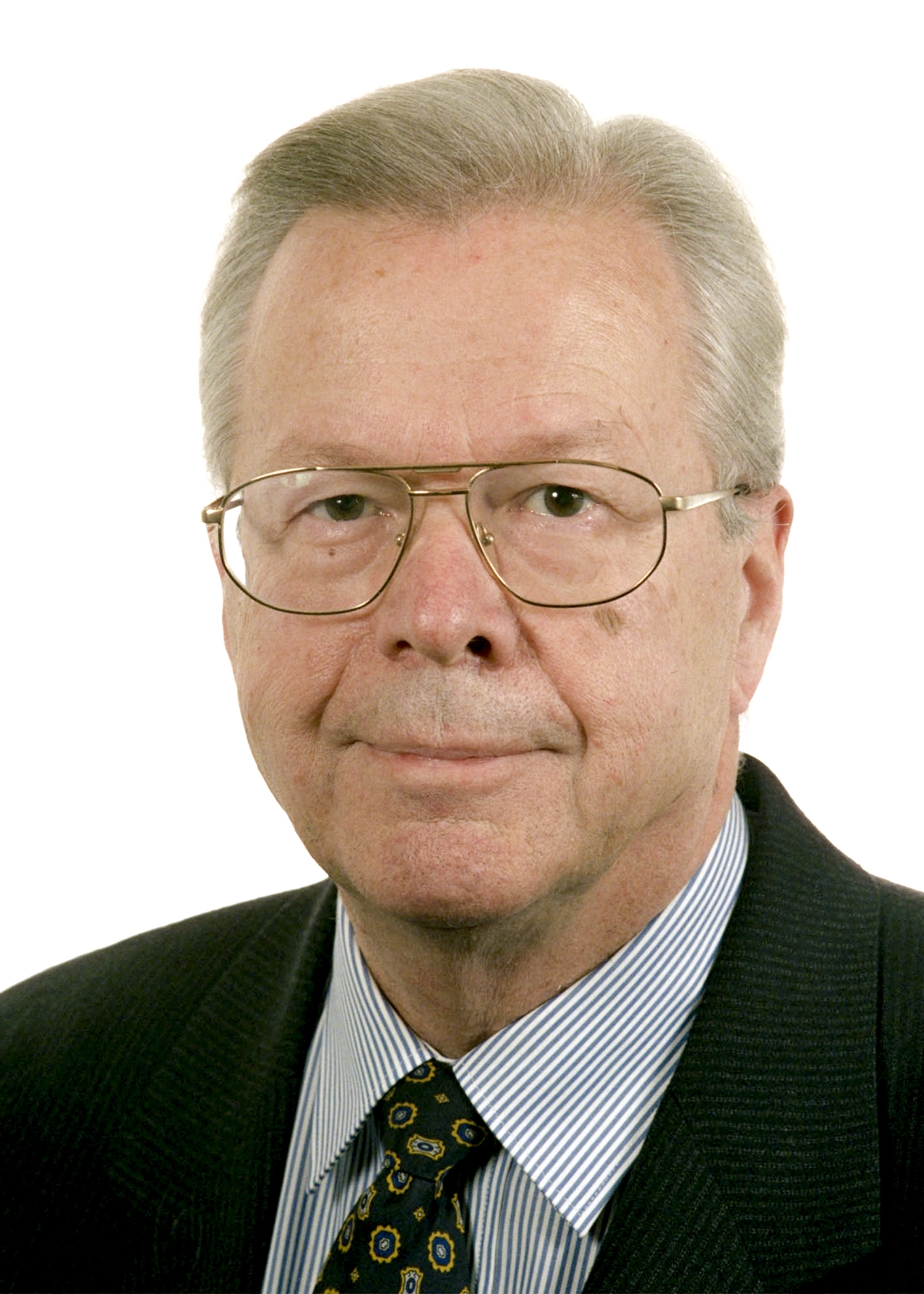
- Ilaskivi in 1994

Member of the European Parliament
- In office 20 October 1996 – 20 July 1999
- Constituency: Finland

Mayor of Helsinki
- In office 1979–1991
- Preceded by: Teuvo Aura
- Succeeded by: Kari Rahkamo

Personal details
- Born: Raimo Hämäläinen; 26 May 1928 (age 98) Ruokolahti, Finland
- Party: NCP
- Education: University of Helsinki

Raimo Ilaskivi (né Hämäläinen; born 26 May 1928) is a Finnish politician. He holds a doctorate degree in political science from the University of Helsinki and has also studied in the United States and in the United Kingdom. He was born as Raimo Hämäläinen but changed his surname to Ilaskivi in 1947.

Ilaskivi is best known as the Mayor of Helsinki from 1979 to 1991. He was a member of the Parliament of Finland between 1962–1975 representing the National Coalition Party, a member of the European Parliament during 1996–1999, and a presidential candidate in the 1994 presidential election. Ilaskivi held the position of docent of economics at the University of Helsinki from 1959 to 1979 acting as a senior lecturer. He was the managing director of the Finnish Banker's Association, the Industrial Bank of Finland, and the Helsinki Stock Exchange. In addition, he has held management positions in several Finnish companies.

Between 1999–2009 Ilaskivi was Chancellor of the Ordo Sancti Constantini Magni and afterwards he has served as Deputy Master. Ilaskivi is also the author of eight books in the field of economics and politics. He has received multiple high awards and decorations both from Finland and foreign countries.

Preceded by Teuvo Aura	Mayor of Helsinki; 1979–1991	Succeeded by Kari Rahkamo
