= Konsti Järnefelt =

Finnish politician

Tapani Kaarlo Aarre Konstantin (Konsti) Järnefelt (16 June 1890, in Taipalsaari – 19 July 1959) was a Finnish politician. He was a Member of the Parliament of Finland from 1951 to 1954, representing the People's Party of Finland.
