= VATT Institute for Economic Research =

Finnish government agency

Coordinates: 60.171796°N 24.930026°E

- Finnish: Valtion taloudellinen tutkimuskeskus Swedish: Statens ekonomiska forskningscentral

Agency overview
- Formed: 1990
- Employees: 50 (2016)
- Agency executive: Tuulia Hakola-Uusitalo

The VATT Institute for Economic Research, previously the Government Institute for Economic Research, is a government agency in Finland. VATT is an abbreviation of its Finnish name Valtion taloudellinen tutkimuskeskus (State Economic Research Institute). The research institute operates under the administrative domain of the Ministry of Finance.

== Location ==
VATT is located in the Economicum building in the centre of Helsinki, on Arkadiankatu. It shares the building with the Department of Economics of the University of Helsinki and The Labour Institute for Economic Research LABORE.

== Research ==
VATT produces scientific research and analyses. In particular, researchers at VATT utilize microeconomic research methods and extensive register data to forecast and evaluate the impact of various policy changes on e.g. the behaviour of individuals, households or firms.

== Publications ==
Researchers at VATT regularly in international scientific publications. They also produce international and domestic working papers, discussion papers, reports and investigations. Most VATT publications can be accessed through the Doria publication archive managed by the National Library of Finland. VATT working papers can also be found from the Research Papers in Economics database. Scientific articles authored by VATT researchers are published regularly in international scientific publications.

== Budget ==
In 2016, VATT's annual budget was EUR 5.5 million, of which two-thirds came from the state budget and one-third from tendered research funding.

== Directors General ==
The Director General of VATT is Tuulia Hakola-Uusitalo. She was appointed to a five-year term of office starting on 1 January 2025. Hakola-Uusitalo already took over as the interim director general in August 2024.

- Reino Hjerppe 1990–2006
- Seija Ilmakunnas 2006–2011
- Aki Kangasharju 2011–2012
- Juhana Vartiainen 2012–2015
- Anni Huhtala 2015–2020
- Mikael Collan 2021–2024
- Tuulia Hakola-Uusitalo 2025–

== Economic Policy Council ==
The institute is home to the Economic Policy Council.
