= Eva-Riitta Siitonen =

Finnish politician

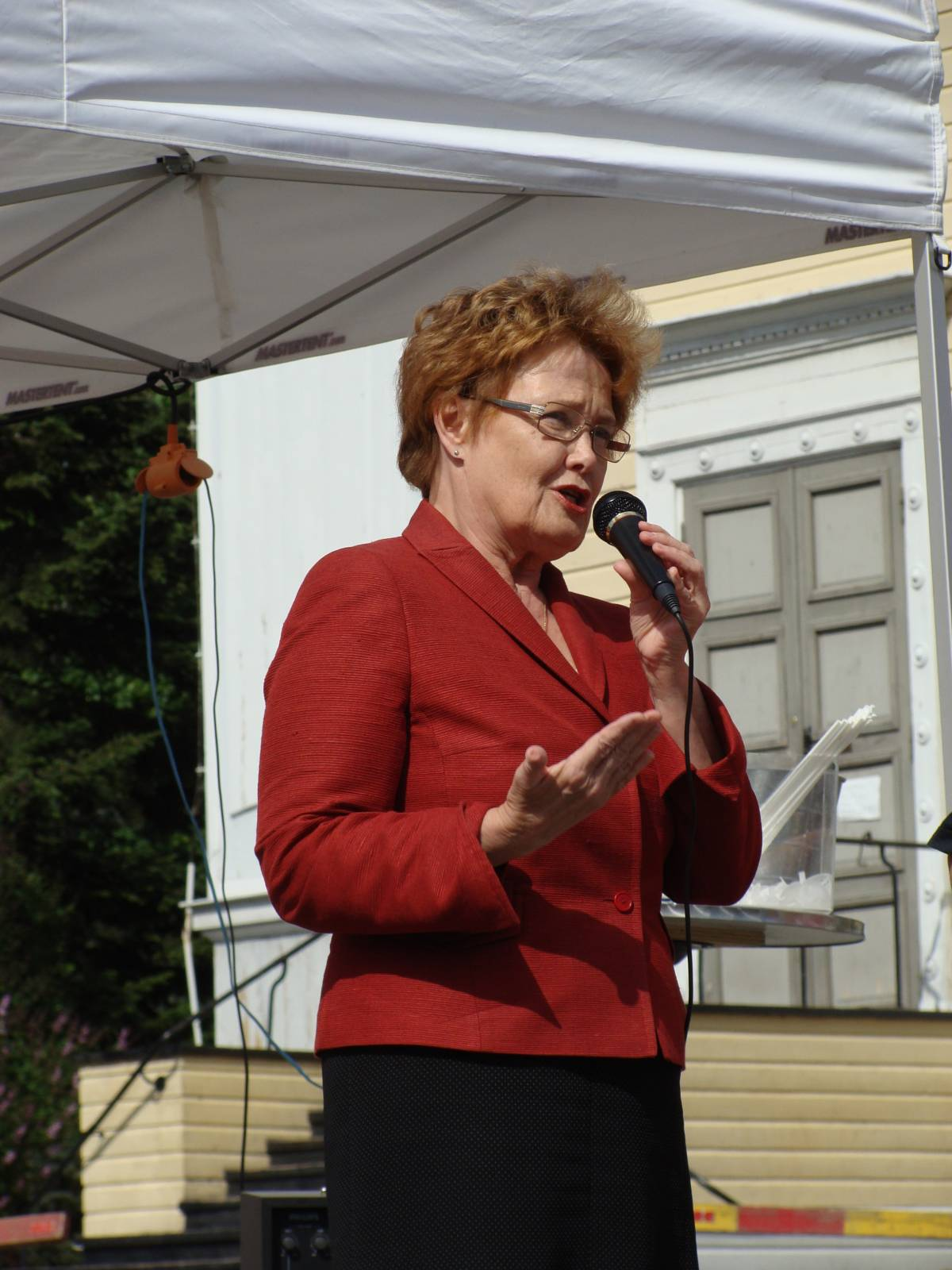
Eva-Riitta Siitonen in 2009

Eva-Riitta Siitonen (born 31 May 1940 in Helsinki) is a Finnish politician. She represents the National Coalition Party.

== Biography ==
She was a member of the Finnish parliament between 1983 and 1989, Governor of the Province of Uusimaa between 1990 and 1996 and first female City Manager of Helsinki between 1996 and 2005.

She was a Member of the European Parliament in 2009.

She has B.Sc. (Econ.) from Helsinki School of Economics and Business Administration.

She is Honorary Doctorate of the College of Veterinary Medicine (1995) and Honorary Doctorate of Helsinki School of Economics and Business Administration (2001).

She was also married to Finnish pop singer, Matti "Fredi" Siitonen and the mother of Hanna-Riikka Siitonen, a Finnish singer and actress, and Petri Siitonen, a son that she had from a previous relationship.

== EU parliament memberships in (2009) ==
- Committee on Legal Affairs
- Committee on Women's Rights and Gender Equality
- Delegation for relations with the People's Republic of China

== Decorations ==
Siitonen has received the following decorations:

- Commander of the Order of the White Rose of Finland
- Medal for Military Merit
- Medal for Civil Defence Merit
- Cross of the Finnish War Invalids
- Medal for National Defence Merit
- Helsinki Medal, golden
- Finnish Police Force, Medal for Merit
- Order of Leopold II, Grand Officer (Belgium)
- Order of the Polar Star, Commander first class (Sweden)
- Order of the White Star, 2nd Class (Estonia)

== See also ==
- Timeline of Helsinki, 1990s
