= Orders, decorations, and medals of Finland =

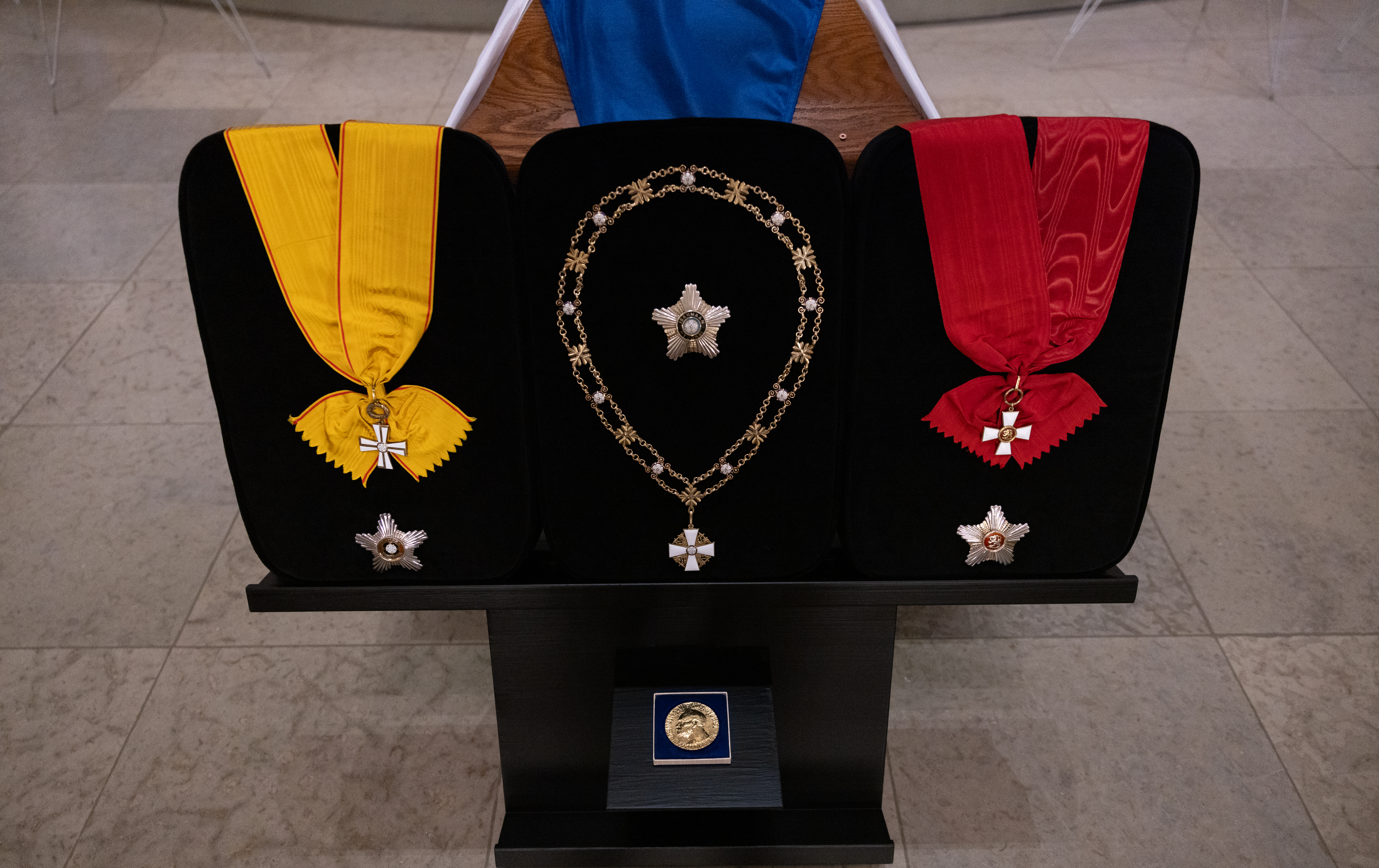
All three Finnish orders on display at the state funeral of Martti Ahtisaari together with his Nobel Peace Prize.

The orders, decorations and medals of Finland form a system through which the Finnish government shows its respect to persons who have distinguished themselves on some walk of life. The legal basis of the system is the Act on the displays of public recognition (1215/1999) which grants the president the authority to issue decrees on orders, medals and titles.

The system is divided into three groups:

1. orders
2. decorations and medals
3. titles

== Orders, decorations, and medals ==
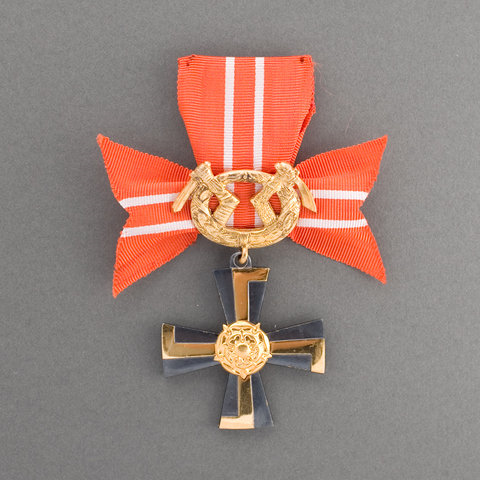
Order of the Cross of Liberty, 3rd class with swords

=== Orders ===
There are three official Finnish orders:

- The Order of the Cross of Liberty, founded in 1918
- The Order of the White Rose of Finland, founded in 1919
- The Order of the Lion of Finland, founded in 1941

The President of Finland is the grand master of all orders. Of the orders, the Order of the Cross of Liberty is the most distinguished and awarded the most seldom. Its decorations are awarded only for military or national defence merits, although the order is not purely military: civilians may receive decorations of the order for national defence merits. The other two orders are awarded both for civilian and military merits. The bulk of the decorations are awarded twice a year, on 4 June on the Flag Day of the Finnish Defence Forces, and on the Independence Day, 6 December. In total, there are about 6.000 awards a year.

The orders of the White Rose and the Lion of Finland have a common board and chancellor, while the Order of the Cross of Liberty has a separate board and chancellor. All orders are awarded by the president of Finland.

The Order of the Cross of Liberty is always awarded "with swords" to military persons, with an additional ribbon in rosette form (see image in the beginning of the article) for combat or war-time merits. The decorations of the Order of the White Rose of Finland are awarded "with swords" only for combat merits and the decorations of the Order of the Lion of Finland only for war-time military merits. As such merits are usually recognised by decorations of the Order of the Cross of Liberty, the awards of the Order of the White Rose of Finland "with swords" have been vanishingly rare. The decorations of the Order of the Lion of Finland were awarded "with swords" mainly for merits incurred in home front service. No awards of either order have been issued "with swords" for merits incurred after the Second World War.

In addition to the three official orders, there is one semi-official: the Order of the Holy Lamb of the Orthodox Church of Finland.

=== Decorations and medals ===
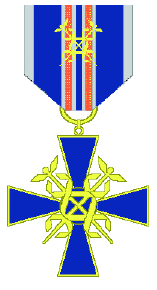
The cross of merit of customs service with a clasp, a typical Finnish branch-specific cross of merit. The cross is awarded by the minister responsible for customs for distinguished service or contributions to the customs service. A cross with a clasp may be awarded in special cases.

The individual areas of government have usually a separate awards system designed to show respect for those persons who do not qualify for an order. Such medals are founded by a presidential decree. Most typically, they include one or two classes: a cross and a medal. Thus far, the following medals have been founded

- The medal of merit of motor transport
- The medals of merit of customs service
- The crosses and medals of merit of Finnish sports and culture of physical exercise
- The Olympic cross (1st and 2nd class) and medal of merit
- The cross and medals of merit of Finnish Red Cross
- Life saving medal
- The memorial medal of the "War of Liberation", i.e. to the participants of the Troops of the Republic of Finland (Whites) in the Finnish Civil War (1918)
- The memorial medal of the Winter War (1939–1940)
- The memorial medal of the Continuation War (1941–1944) and Lapland War (1944–1945)
- Mine clearance medal
- Medal for humane benevolence (Pro Benignitate Humana)
- The cross of merit of the invalids of war
- The cross and medal of merit of police
- The cross and medal of merit of Finnish Border Guard
- The badge of merit of fire prevention
- The 1st and 2nd classes of the medal of merit of civil defence
- The cross of merit of prison service
- The cross of merit of customs service, with or without a clasp
- The military merit medal
- The golden medal of merit of Suomen Reserviupseeriliitto (Finnish reserve officers' association)
- Guild metal of merit
- The cross of merit of Reserviläisliitto – Reservin Aliupseerien Liitto (Reservists' association – Reserve NCOs' association)
- The medal of merit of Insinööriupseeriliitto (Engineer Officers' association)
- The medal of merit of Kadettikunta (Cadet Corps)
- The medal of merit of traffic safety branch
- The special medal of merit of work for working environment

In addition, there is a state decoration for 30 years of service of state. The corresponding decorations of the Central Chamber of Commerce and City of Helsinki the League of Finnish Municipalities are also approved for use with the official decorations. Other decorations of private bodies may only be used privately.

The awarding body of the medals and crosses of merits varies. Although the decorations are founded by the president, the awarding body is usually the chief of the authority in question, i.e. a minister or a high-level civil servant.

=== Order of precedence ===
The official order of precedence is:

	Name In English, Finnish, and Swedish	Abbreviation
1	Grand Cross, with Collar, of the Order of the White Rose of Finland; Suomen Valkoisen Ruusun suurristi ketjuineen Storkorset med kedja av Finlands Vita Ros’ orden	FWR GC collar SVR SR ketj. FVR SK kedj.
2	Grand Cross of the Order of the Cross of Liberty; Vapaudenristin suurristi Frihetskorsets storkors	- VR SR; FrK SK
3	Grand Cross of the Order of the White Rose of Finland; Suomen Valkoisen Ruusun suurristi Storkorset av Finlands Vita Ros’ orden	FWR GC; SVR SR; FVR SK
4	Grand Cross of the Order of the Lion of Finland; Suomen Leijonan suurristi Storkorset av Finlands Lejons orden	FL GC; SL SR; FLO SK
5	Mannerheim Cross, 1st Class, of the Order of the Cross of Liberty; Vapaudenristin 1. luokan Mannerheim -risti Frihetskorsets Mannerheimkors av 1. klass	- MR 1 MK 1
6	Cross of Liberty, 1st Class with star 1. luokan Vapaudenristi rintatähtineen Frihetskorsets 1. klass med kraschan	- VR 1 rtk. FrK 1 mkr.
7	Commander, First Class, of the Order of the White Rose of Finland; Suomen Valkoisen Ruusun I luokan komentajamerkki Kommendörstecknet av I klass av Finlands Vita Ros’ orden	FWR C I SVR K I FVR K I
8	Commander, First Class, of the Order of the Lion of Finland; Suomen Leijonan I luokan komentajamerkki Kommendörstecknet av I klass av Finlands Lejons orden	FL C I SL K I FLO K I
9	Mannerheim Cross, 2nd Class, of the Order of the Cross of Liberty; Vapaudenristin 2. luokan Mannerheimristi; Frihetskorsets Mannerheimkors av 2. klass	- MR 2 MK 2
10	Cross of Liberty, 1st Class; 1. luokan Vapaudenristi; Frihetskorsets 1. klass	- VR 1 FrK 1
11	Commander of the Order of the White Rose of Finland; Suomen Valkoisen Ruusun komentajamerkki Kommendörstecknet av Finlands Vita Ros’ orden	FWR C SVR K FVR K
12	Commander of the Order of the Lion of Finland; Suomen Leijonan komentajamerkki Kommendörstecknet av Finlands Lejons orden	FL C SL K FLO K
13	Great Cross of Merit of the Finnish Sports; Suomenliikuntakulttuurin ja urheilun suuri ansioristi Finlands idrottskulturs stora förtjänstkors	- SU s.ar Fl s. fk.
14	Finnish Olympic Cross of Merit, First Class; Suomen Olympialaisen ansioristin 1. luokka Finlands Olympiska förtjänstkors av 1 klass	- O ar 1 O fk 1
15	Medal of Liberty, 1st Class with rosette, of the Order of the Cross of Liberty; 1. luokan Vapaudenmitali ruusukenauhassa Frihetsmedaljens 1. klass med rosett på bandet	- Vm 1 rnk. Frm 1 mrb.
16	Medal of Merit in gold of the Order of the Cross of Liberty; Vapaudenristin kultainen ansiomitali Frihetskorsets förtjänstmedalj i guld	- VR kult.Am; FrK Fm g.
17	Cross of Mourning of the Order of the Cross of Liberty; Vapaudenristin sururisti Frihetskorsets sorgekors	- VR surur. FrK srk.
18	Medal of Mourning of the Order of the Cross of Liberty; Vapaudenristin surumitali Frihetskorsets sorgemedalj	- VR surum. FrK srm.
19	Cross of Liberty, 2nd Class, of the Order of the Cross of Liberty; 2. luokan Vapaudenristi; Frihetskorsets 2. klass	- VR 2 FrK 2
20	Cross of Liberty, 3rd Class, of the Order of the Cross of Liberty; 3. luokan Vapaudenristi; Frihetskorsets 3. klass	- VR 3 FrK 3
21	Cross of Liberty, 4th Class, of the Order of the Cross of Liberty, for war-time merits 4. luokan Vapaudenristi sodanajan ansioista Frihetskorsets 4. klass för krigstida förtjänster	- VR 4 FrK 4
22	Knight, First Class, of the Order of the White Rose of Finland; Suomen Valkoisen Ruusun I luokan ritarimerkki Riddartecknet av I klass av Finlands Vita Ros’ orden	FWR K I SVR R I FVR R I
23	Pro Finlandia Medal of the Order of the Lion of Finland; Suomen Leijonan Pro Finlandia-mitali; Pro Finlandia-medaljen av Finlands Lejons orden	FL PF; SL PF; FLO PF
24	Badge of Merit of the Order of the White Rose of Finland (Note: Changed to Cross of Merit of the Red Cross of Finland in 1993.); Suomen Valkoisen Ruusun ansiomerkki Finlands Vita Ros’ tecken	- SVR am FVR T
25	Knight, First Class, of the Order of the Lion of Finland; Suomen Leijonan I luokan ritarimerkki Riddartecknet av I klass av Finlands Lejons orden	FL K I SL R I FLO R I
26	Cross of Liberty, 4th Class, of the Order of the Cross of Liberty, for peace-time merits 4. luokan Vapaudenristi rauhanajan ansioista Frihetskorsets 4. klass för fredstida förtjänster	- VR 4 ra FrK 4 fr
27	Knight of the Order of the White Rose of Finland; Suomen Valkoisen Ruusun ritarimerkki Riddartecknet av Finlands Vita Ros’ orden	FWR K SVR R FVR R
28	Knight of the Order of the Lion of Finland; Suomen Leijonan ritarimerkki Riddartecknet av Finlands Lejons orden	FL K SL R FLO R
29	Cross of Merit of the Order of the White Rose of Finland; Suomen Valkoisen Ruusun ansioristi Förtjänstkorset av Finlands Vita Ros’ orden	FWR Cm; SVR Ar; FVR Fk
30	Cross of Merit of the Order of the Lion of Finland; Suomen Leijonan ansioristi Förtjänstkorset av Finlands Lejons orden	FL Cm; SL Ar; FLO Fk
31	Cross of Merit of the Red Cross of Finland; Suomen Punaisen Ristin ansioristi Finlands Röda Kors’ förtjänstkors	- SPR ar FRK fk
32	Medal for Life-saving; Hengenpelastus-mitali; Livräddingsmedaljen	- HPM; LRM
33	Finnish Olympic Cross of Merit, Second Class; Suomen Olympialaisen ansioristin 2. luokka Finlands Olympiska förttjänstkors av 2. klass	- O ar 2 O fk 2
34	Medal of Liberty, 1st Class, of the Order of the Cross of Liberty; 1. luokan Vapaudenmitali; Frihetsmedaljens 1. klass	- VM 1 FrM 1
35	Medal of Merit, 1st Class, of the Cross of Liberty; Vapaudenristin 1. luokan ansiomitali Frihetskorsets förtjänstmedalj av 1. klass	- VR Am 1 FrK Fm 1
36	Medal of Liberty, 2nd Class, of the Order of the Cross of Liberty; 2. luokan Vapaudenmitali; Frihetsmedaljens 2. klass	- VM 2 FrM 2
37	Medal of Merit, 2nd Class, of the Cross of Liberty; Vapaudenristin 2. luokan ansiomitali Frihetskorsets förtjänstmedalj av 2. klass	- VR Am 2 FrK Fm 2
38	Memorial Medal with Rose of the War of Independence; Vapaussodan muistomitali ruusuineen Frihetskrigets minnesmedalj med ros	- Vs. mm rk. Frk. mm mr
39	Medal, First Class with golden cross and clasp, of the Order of the White Rose of Finland; Suomen Valkoisen Ruusun I luokan mitali kultaristein ja solkineen Medalj av I klass med guldkors och spänne av Finlands Vita Ros’ orden	FWR M I gold clasp SVR M I kr sk. FVR M I gk msp.
40	Medal, First Class with clasp, of the Order of the White Rose of Finland; Suomen Valkoisen Ruusun I luokan mitali solkineen Medalj av I klass med spänne av Finlands Vita Ros’ orden	FWR M I clasp SVR M I sk. FVR M I msp.
41	Medal with clasp, of the Order of the White Rose of Finland; Suomen Valkoisen Ruusun mitali solkineen Medalj med spänne av Finlands Vita Ros’ orden	FWR M clasp SVR M sk. FVR M msp.
42	Memorial Medal of the War of Independence; Vapaussodan muistomitali Frihetskrigets minnesmedalj	- Vs. mm Frk. mm
43	Memorial Medal of the war 1939-1940 (Winter War); Vuosien 1939 – 1940 sodan (talvisodan) muistomitali Minnesmedalj för deltagande i 1939-1940 års krig (vinterkriget)	- Ts. mm Vk. mm
44	Memorial Medal of the 1941-1945 war (Continuation War); Vuosien 1941 – 1945 sodan (jatkosodan) muistomitali Minnesmedalj för deltagande i 1941-1945 års krig (fortsättningskriget)	- Js. mm Fk. mm
45	Memorial Medal of the Mine Clearing; Miinanraivausmitali; Minröjningsmedaljen	- Mrm; Mrm
46	First Class Medal of the Order of the White Rose of Finland with golden cross Suomen Valkoisen Ruusun I luokan mitali kultaristein Medalj av I klass med guldkors av Finlands Vita Ros’ orden	FWR M I gold SVR M I kr FVR M I gk
47	First Class Medal of the Order of the White Rose of Finland; Suomen Valkoisen Ruusun I luokan mitali Medalj av I klass av Finlands Vita Ros’ orden	FWR M I SVR M I FVR M I
48	Medal of the Order of the White Rose of Finland; Suomen Valkoisen Ruusun mitali Medalj av Finlands Vita Ros’ orden	FWR M SVR M FVR M
49	Medal for Military Merits; Sotilasansiomitali; Militärens förtjänstmedalj	- Sot. am Mil. fm
50	Medal of Merit, in gold, of the Red Cross of Finland; Suomen Punaisen Ristin kultainen ansiomitali Finlands Röda Kors’ förtjänstmedalj i guld	- SPR kult. am FRK fm g.
51	Medal of Merit, in silver, of the Red Cross of Finland; Suomen Punaisen Ristin hopeinen ansiomitali Finlands Röda Kors’ förtjänstmedalj i silver	- SPR hop. am FRK fm silv.
52	Pro Benignitate Humana -medal Mitali inhimillisestä auliudesta (Pro Benignitate Humana); Hederstecknet för mänsklig barmhärtighet (Pro Benignitate Humana)	- PBH; PBH
53	Medal of Merit, in bronze, of the Red Cross of Finland; Suomen Punaisen Ristin pronssinen ansiomitali Finlands Röda Kors’ förtjänstmedalj i brons	- SPR pr. am FRK fm br.
54	Finnish Olympic Medal of Merit; Suomen Olympialainen ansiomitali Finlands Olympiska förtjänstmedalj	- O am O fm
55	Cross of Merit of the War Invalides; Sotainvalidien ansioristi Krigsinvalidernas förtjänstkors	- Sotainv. ar Krinv. fk
56	Cross of Merit of the Police; Poliisin ansioristi Polisens förtjänstkors	- P ar P fk
57	Cross of Merit of the Frontier Guards; Rajavartiolaitoksen ansioristi Gränsbevakningsväsendets förtjänstkors	- RVL ar GBV fk
58	Cross of Merit of the Oak Leaf Heritage Association (Note: No official translation provided.); Tammenlehvän Perinneliiton ansioristi Traditionsförbundet Eklövets förtjänstkors	- TaPe Ar; TrEk Fk
59	Cross of Merit of the Fire Defence (Fire Cross); Palotorjunnan ansiomerkki (paloristi); Brandvärnets förtjänstkors (brandkorset)	- PR; BK
60	Cross of Merit, in gold, of the Finnish Sports; Suomen liikuntakulttuurin ja urheilun kultainen ansioristi Finlands idrottskulturs förtjänstkors i guld	- SU kult. ar Fl fk g.
61	Cross of Merit, in silver, of the Finnish Sports; Suomen liikuntakulttuurin ja urheilun ansioristi Finlands idrottskulturs förtjänstkors	- SU ar Fl fk
62	Medal of Merit, First Class with clasp, of the Civil Defence; Väestönsuojelun 1. luokan ansiomitali solkineen Förtjänstmedaljen för befolkningsskyddsarbete av 1. klass med spänne	- Vss. am 1 sk. Bsk. fm 1 msp.
63	Medal of Merit, Second Class with clasp, of the Civil Defence; Väestönsuojelun 2. luokan ansiomitali solkineen Förtjänstmedaljen för befolkningsskyddsarbete av 2. klass med spänne	- Vss. am 2 sk. Bsk. fm 2 msp.
64	Medal of Merit in silver with golden cross, of the Finnish Sports; Suomen liikunta- kulttuurin ja urheilun ansiomitali kullatuin ristein Finlands idrottskulturs förtjänstmedalj med förgyllt kors	- SU am krk. Fl fm mgk.
65	Medal of Merit First Class, of the Civil Defence; Väestönsuojelun 1. luokan ansiomitali Förtjänstmedaljen för befolkningsskyddsarbete av 1. klass	- Vss am 1 Bsk. fm 1
66	Medal of Merit in silver, of the Finnish Sports; Suomen liikuntakulttuurin ja urheilun ansiomitali Finlands idrottskulturs förtjänstmedalj	- Su am Fl fm
67	Medal of Merit of the Frontier Guards; Rajavartiolaitoksen ansiomitali Gränsbevakningsväsendets förtjänstmedalj	- RVL am GBV fm
68	Medal of Merit Second Class, of the Civil Defence; Väestönsuojelun 2. luokan ansiomitali Förtjänstmedaljen för befolkningsskyddsarbete av 2. klass	- Vss. am 2 Bsk. fm 2
69	Medal of merit in bronze, of the Finnish Sports; Suomen Urheilun pronssinen ansiomitali Finlands idrotts förtjänstmedalj i brons	- SU pr. am Fl fm br.
70	Cross of Merit, of the Prison Administration; Vankeinhoidon ansioristi Fångvårdens förtjänstkors	- Vh. ar Fv. fk
71	Medal of merit with clasp of customs service Tullilaitoksen ansioristi soljen kera Tullverkets förtjänstkors med spänne	- Tulli ar sk. Tull fk msp.
72	Gold Medal of Merit with clasp of the Reserve Officers Association; Suomen Reserviupseeriliiton kultainen ansiomitali solkineen Finlands Reservofficersförbunds förtjänstmedalj i guld med spänne	- RUL am sk. ROF fm msp.
73	Medal of Merit of the Association of Voluntary Defence Guilds; Kilta-ansiomitali; Försvarsgillenas förtjänstmedalj	- Kilta am FG fm
74	Medal of merit of customs service Tullilaitoksen ansioristi Tullverkets förtjänstkors	- Tulli ar Tull fk
75	Cross of merit with clasp of Reservists’ association Reserviläisliitto – Reservin Aliupseerien Liiton ansioristi solkineen Reservistförbundet – Reservunderofficersförbundets förtjänstkors med spänne	- RAUL ar sk. RuOF fk msp.
76	Medal of Merit with clasp of the Association of the Warrant Officers’ Päällystöliiton ansiomitali soljen kera Befälsförbundets förtjänstmedalj med spänne	- PL am sk. BF fm msp.
77	Gold Medal of Merit of the Reserve Officers Association; Suomen Reserviupseeriliiton kultainen ansiomitali Finlands Reservofficersförbunds förtjänstmedalj i guld	- RUL am ROF fm
78	Cross of merit of Reservists’ association Reserviläisliitto – Reservin Aliupseerien Liiton ansioristi Reservistförbundet – Reservunderofficersförbundets förtjänstkors	- RAUL ar RuOF fk
79	Medal of Merit of the Association of the Warrant Officers; Päällystöliiton ansiomitali Befälsförbundets förtjänstmedalj	- PL am BF fm
80	Medal of Merit of the Engineering Officers’ Association; Insinööriupseeriliiton ansiomitali Ingenjörofficersförbundets förtjänstmedalj	- IUL am IOF fm
81	Medal of Merit of the Cadet Corps; Kadettikunnan ansiomitali Kadettkårens förtjänstmedalj	- KK am KK fm
82	The medal of merit of traffic safety branch Liikenneturvallisuus-alan ansiomitali Förtjänstmedalj för trafiksäkerhetsarbete	- Lt am Ts fm
83	The special medal of merit of work for working environment Työympäristötyön erityisansiomitali Specialförtjänstmedalj för arbetsmiljöarbete	- Tyt am Ama fm
84	Medal of Merit, in gold, of the Police; Poliisin kullattu ansiomitali Polisens förgyllda förtjänstmedalj	- P am P fm
85	Medal of Merit of motor traffic branch Moottoriliikenteen ansiomitali Förtjänstmedalj för motorfordonstrafikarbete	- Ml am Mt fm

Memorial Crosses and Memorial Medals of the War of Independence, Winter War, and Continuation War and other Crosses of Merit and Medals of Merit of patriotic activity in chronological order.

The list of the other Crosses and Medals of Merit of patriotic activity authorised for wear in a military uniform and their order of precedence is presented by the Finnish Defence Forces. Of the following national level patriotic organisations, only the highest decoration awarded by the same organisation is carried; note that some are approved into the official awards order of precedence above and are to be carried according to it:

	Name In English, Finnish, and Swedish	Abbreviation
89 (Note: 86th, 87th and 88th are the War of Independence, Winter War and Continuation War decorations as explained above.)	Civil Guard Crosses of Merit and Medal of Merit (Note: No official translation provided.) (Note: Awarding of this decoration has ended.); Suojeluskuntain ansioristit ja -mitali Skyddskårernas förtjänstkors och -medalj	- Sk Ar/Sk am -
90	Lotta Svärd Cross of Merit and Medal of Merit; Lotta Svärd -järjestön ansioristi ja -mitali Lotta Svärd-organisationens förtjänstkors och -medalj	- (Note: Abbreviation unavailable.)
91	Crosses of Merit of the Disabled War Veterans' Association of Finland; Sotainvalidien Veljesliiton ansioristit Krigsinvalidernas Brödraförbundets förtjänstkors	- Sotainv ar -
92	Crosses of Merit, Medal of Merit and Medal of Finnish War Veterans League; Suomen Sotaveteraaniliiton ansioristit, ansiomitali ja mitali Finlands Krigsveteranförbundets förtjänstkors, förtjänstmedalj och medalj	- Sotavet ar/Sotavet am/Sotavet m -
93	Cross of Merit of the Union of Front Veteran Soldiers in Finland; Rintamaveteraaniliiton kunniaristi Frontveteranernas förbundets förtjänstkors	-
94	Cross of Merit and Medal of Merit of the Association of Women on the Front Line; Rintamanaisten liiton ansioristi ja -mitali Frontkvinnornas förbundets förtjänstkors och -medalj	-
95	Cross of Merit of the Soldiers' Home Association; Sotilaskotiliiton ansioristi Soldathemsförbundets förtjänstkors	-
96	Blue Cross; Sininen Risti; Blå Kors	- SR -
97	Medals of Merit of the Finnish Officers' Union; Upseeriliiton ansiomitalit Officersförbundets förtjänstmedaljer	- UL am -
98	Medal of Merit of the Finnish Medical Officers' Union; Lääkintäupseeriliiton ansiomitali Sanitetsofficersförbundets förtjänstmedalj	-
99	Medals of Merit of the Finnish Non-Commissioned Officers' Union; Aliupseeriliiton ansiomitalit Underofficersförbundets förtjänstmedaljer	-
100	Medal of Merit of the National Defence Personnel Union; Maanpuolustuksen Henkilökuntaliiton ansiomitali Landsförsvarets Personalförbundets förtjänstmedalj	-
101	Crosses of Merit and Medals of Merit of the Peacekeepers’ Association Finland; Suomen Rauhanturvaajaliiton ansioristit ja mitalit Finlands Fredsbevararförbundets förtjänstkors och -medaljer	- SRTL Ar I/SRTL Ar II/SRTL kam/SRTL ham/SRTL pam -
102	Medals of Merit of the National Defence Training Association of Finland; Maanpuolustuskoulutusyhdistyksen ansiomitalit Försvarsutbildningsföreningens förtjänstmedaljer	- MPK k am mk/MPK k am/MPK h am/MPK r am -
103	Silver and Bronze Medal of Merit of the Reserve Officers Association (Note: Gold Medal of Merit with clasp and Gold Medal of Merit are 71st and 76th, respectively.); Suomen Reserviupseeriliiton hopeinen ja pronssinen ansiomitali Finlands Reservofficersförbunds förtjänstmedalj i silver och brons	- RUL ham/RUL pam -
104	Medals of Merit of Reservists’ Association (Note: Cross of merit with clasp and Cross of merit are 74th and 77th, respectively.); Reserviläisliiton ansiomitalit Reservistförbundets förtjänstmedaljer	- RES kam/RES ham/RES pam/RES ErAm -
105	Silver and Bronze Cross of the Association of Voluntary Defence Guilds (Note: Medal of Merit is 72nd.); Maanpuolustuskiltojen liiton hopeinen ja pronssinen kiltaristi Försvarsgillenas förbundets gillekors i silver och brons	-
106	Cross of Merit and Medals of Merit of the Finnish Women's National Defence Organization; Maanpuolustusnaisten liiton ansioristi ja -mitalit Förbundet för försvarskvinnor i Finland förtjänstkors och -medaljer	-
107	National Defence Medal with swords, National Defence Medal with gold or silver clasp Maanpuolustusmitali miekkojen kera, maanpuolustusmitali kultaisella ja hopeisella soljella Försvarsmedalj med svärd, försvarsmedalj med guldspänne eller silverspänne	- Mpm mk/Mpm ksk/Mpm hsk -
108	Cross of Merit of the Finnish Civil Defence Association; Suomen Väestönsuojelun ansioristi Finlands befolkningsskydds förtjänstkors	- SVJ ar -
109	Crosses of Merit and Medals of Merit of the Finnish National Rescue Association; Suomen Pelastusalan Keskusjärjestön ansioristit ja -mitalit Räddningsbranschens Centralorganisation i Finland förtjänstkors och -medaljer	- SPEK E Ar I/SPEK E Ar/SPEK Ar I/SPEK Ar/SPEK Am I/SPEK Am -

In continuation to the above list, a maximum of two, of the following approved list of service and training branch and patriotic organisation decorations, may be carried in military uniform after the decorations listed above, in order of personal preference:

	Name In English, Finnish, and Swedish	Abbreviation
110-111	(Note: No official translation provided.); Ali-, Toimi- ja Opistoupseerien Perinneyhdistyksen perinnemitali	- (Note: Abbreviation unavailable.)
110-111	Autojoukkojen killan ansiomitali	-
110-111	Autojoukkokiltojen liiton automiesristi	-
110-111	Etelä-Hämeen Reserviläispiirin ansioristi tai -mitali	-
110-111	Hakkapeliittayhdistyksen ansiomitali	-
110-111	Logistics Cross of Merit; Huoltoupseeriyhdistyksen Huollon ansioristi Underhållets förtjänstkors	-
110-111	Cross of Merit of Air Defence; Ilmatorjunta-ansioristi; Luftvärnets förtjänstkors	-
110-111	Cross of Merit of the Air Force; Ilmavoimien ansioristi Flygvapnets förtjänstkors	-
110-111	Ilmavoimien Kiltaliiton kiltaristi tai kiltamitali	-
110-111	Infantry Cross of Merit; Jalkaväen säätiön Jalkaväen ansioristi Infanteriets förtjänstkors	- Jv ar -
110-111	Karjalan Kaartin - Prikaatin Killan ansioristi	-
110-111	Kymen Jääkäripataljoonan Killan ansiomitali	-
110-111	Laivaston Killan ansioristi Flottans Gilles förtjänstmedalj	-
110-111	Laskuvarjojääkärikillan kiltaristi	-
110-111	National Defence Medal with bronze clasp (Note: Upper grades are 106th.); Maanpuolustusmitali pronssisella soljella Försvarsmedalj med bronsspänne	- Mpm psk -
110-111	Cross of Merit of the Navy; Merivoimien ansioristi Marinens förtjänstkors	-
110-111	Nylands Brigads Gille r.f. ansiomitali Nylands Brigads Gilles Förtjänstmedalj	-
110-111	Panssarikillan ansioristi tai -mitali	-
110-111	Medal of Merit of Military Engineering; Pioneeriaselajin liiton, Helsingin Reserviupseerien Pioneeriosaston ja Pioneerisäätiön ansiomitali Pionjärförtjänstmedaljen	-
110-111	Pirkanmaan Viestikillan ansiomitali	-
110-111	Pohjois-Karjalan Prikaatin Killan ansioristi	-
110-111	Nordic Veterans' Medal of Honour; Pohjoismainen Veteraaniansiomitali (ent. Pohjoismainen Sinibarettiansiomitali); BNVF Medalj	-
110-111	Porin Rykmentin - Porin Prikaatin killan ansioristi	-
110-111	Raja- ja Merivartiojoukkojen Perinneyhdistyksen Merivartioristi; Gräns- och Sjöbevakningstruppernas Traditionsförbundets Sjöbevakningskorset	-
110-111	Rakuunakillan ansiomitali	-
110-111	Rannikkojääkärikillan ansiomitali Kustjägargillets förtjänstmedalj	-
110-111	Coastal Defence Medal; Rannikon Puolustajain Killan ansiomitali Kustförsvarsgillets förtjänstmedalj	-
110-111	Ratsumieskillan ansiomitali	-
110-111	Cavalry Cross of Merit; Ratsuväen ansioristi Kavalleriets förtjänstkors	-
110-111	Reserviläisurheiluliiton ansiomitalit	-
110-111	Reserviratsastajat ry:n Reservin Ratsastajamitali	-
110-111	Cross of Merit or Medal of Merit of The Finnish Naval Reserve; Sininen Reservi ry:n ansioristi tai ansiomitali Marinreservens förtjänststeck och förtjänstmedalj	-
110-111	Sotavainajien muiston vaalimisyhdistyksen sotavainajamitali	-
110-111	Sotilasmusiikkikillan sotilasmusiikkiristi	-
110-111	Sotilaspoikien perinneliiton Sotilaspoikaristi; Soldatgossarnas Traditionsförbundets Soldatsgossekors	- Spoikar -
110-111	Military Intelligence Cross of Merit; Sotilastiedustelun ansioristi Underrättelsetjänstens förtjänstkors	-
110-111	Stadin Sissien Sissiansiomitali	-
110-111	Suomenlahden Laivastokillan ansioristi tai risti	-
110-111	Suomen Lottaperinneliitto ry:n ansioristi	-
110-111	TK- Tiedotuskillan sotilastiedotuksen ansiomitali	-
110-111	Topografikillan risti	-
110-111	Turun Laivastokillan ansioristi	-
110-111	Tykkimiehet ry:n Tykkimiesmitali	-
110-111	Uudenmaan Jääkäripataljoonan killan ansiomitali	-
110-111	Vapaussodan Invalidien Muistosäätiön Lottamuistomitali	-
110-111	Varsinais-Suomen Reserviläispiirien ansiomitali	-
110-111	Veteraanivastuun ansioristi	-
110-111	Signal Cross; Viestikiltojen Liitto ry:n Viestiristi; Signalkorset	-
110-111	Österbottens Försvarsgille - Pohjanmaan Maanpuolustuskillan ansioristi Österbottens Försvarsgilles förtjänstkors	-

Crosses and Medals of Merit, which would otherwise fall in the above category of patriotic activity, but are not listed, are to be treated as unofficial decorations in regard to carrying them in military uniform.

Service medals of UN, NATO and EU are carried after all Finnish decorations, including the Finnish International Service Medal, with the meritorius service medals of the international organisations before the standard service medals:

	Name In English, Finnish, and Swedish	Abbreviation
112	International Service Medal (Note: No official translation provided.) (Note: Clasps denote operations participated.); Kansainvälisen palveluksen muistomitali	- (Note: Abbreviation unavailable.)
113	Captain Mbaye Diagne Medal; Kapteeni Mbaye Diagne -mitali Kapten Mbaye Diagne -medalj	-
114	UN Medals (Note: In order from the oldest operation to the newest, by the beginning date of the entire operation.); YK-mitalit; FN-medaljer	-
115	NATO Meritorious Service Medal; NATOn ansiomitali NATO-förtjänstmedalj	-
116	NATO Medals; NATO-mitalit; NATO-medaljer	-
117	EU Common Security and Defence Policy Medal for Extraordinary Meritorious Service; EU:n yhteisen turvallisuus- ja puolustuspolitiikan ansiomitali EU:s gemensamma säkerhets- och försvarspolitiks förtjänstmedalj	-
118	EU Common Security and Defence Policy Service Medals; EU:n yhteisen turvallisuus- ja puolustuspolitiikan muistomitalit EU:s gemensamma säkerhets- och försvarspolitiks minnesmedaljer	-

After the above lists (i.e. official decorations and Memorial Crosses and Memorial Medals of the War of Independence, Winter War, and Continuation War and other Crosses of Merit and Medals of Merit of patriotic activity) are to be carried the semi-official decorations, although they aren't authorised to be worn in military uniform, except for events of the awarding party. The order of precedence of them is:

	Name In English, Finnish, and Swedish	Abbreviation
119	Grand Cross of the Order of the Holy Lamb; Pyhän Karitsan suurristin komentajamerkki -	- PKR SR -
120	Commander, First Class, of the Order of the Holy Lamb; Pyhän Karitsan 1. luokan komentajamerkki -	- PKR K I -
121	Commander, Second Class, of the Order of the Holy Lamb; Pyhän Karitsan 2. luokan komentajamerkki -	- PKR K II -
122	Knight/Member, First Class, of the Order of the Holy Lamb (Note: Laymen are called knights, whereas clergy members.); Pyhän Karitsan 1. luokan ritarimerkki/jäsen -	- PKR R I -
123	Knight/Member, Second Class, of the Order of the Holy Lamb; Pyhän Karitsan 2. luokan ritarimerkki/jäsen -	- PKR R II -
124	Medal, First Class, of the Order of the Holy Lamb; Pyhän Karitsan 1. luokan mitali -	- PKR M I -
125	Medal, Second Class, of the Order of the Holy Lamb; Pyhän Karitsan 2. luokan mitali -	- PKR M II -
126	Saint Henry Cross (Note: No official translation provided.); Pyhän Henrikin risti Sankt Henrikskorset	- PHR -
127	Mikael Agricola Cross; Mikael Agricolan risti Mikael Agricolakorset	- MAR -
128	Pro Ecclesia Medal; Pro ecclesia -mitali Pro ecclesia -medaljen	- (Note: Abbreviation unavailable.)
129	Medals of Merit of the Finnish Economic Society; Suomen Talousseuran ansiomitalit Finska Hushållningssällskapets medalj	- -
130	Medals of Merit of the Finland Chamber of Commerce; Keskuskauppakamarin ansiomerkit Centralhandelskammarens förtjänststecken	- -

In addition to the semi-official decorations, certain other decorations are authorised to be worn akin to the semi-official decorations alongside the official decorations (except for military personnel):

	Name In English, Finnish, and Swedish	Abbreviation
131	Medals of Merit of the Association of Finnish Cities; Suomen Kaupunkiliiton ansiomerkit Finlands Stadsförbunds förtjänststecken	- - -
132	Medals of Merit of the Association of Finnish Municipalities; Suomen Kunnallisliiton ansiomerkit Finlands Kommunförbunds förtjänststecken	- - -
133	Helsinki Medal; Helsinki-mitali; Helsingforsmedalj	- - -

Unofficial decorations are carried after the semi-official decorations and only in events of the awarding party.

Foreign decorations are carried after the semi-official decorations in French alphabetical order of the countries, although military personnel need to apply for permit for each foreign decoration from the Defence Command Personnel Division to be allowed to carry them.

== Titles ==
Although a republic, Finland has a tradition of awarding titles for distinguished citizens. The available titles are listed in the presidential decree on titles (381/2000). The titles are classified in 16 categories of precedence. The two highest titles are valtioneuvos/statsråd (literal translation English: “state counsellor”) and vuorineuvos/bergsråd (literal translation English: “mountain counsellor”). The former is usually awarded to most distinguished, retired politicians, while the latter is meant for the CEOs of the largest Finnish companies. Less distinguished titles span different walks of life. Curiosities include liikenneneuvos (English: traffic counsellor), kotiseutuneuvos (English: home district counsellor) and nuorisoasiainneuvos (English: youth affairs counsellor). In total, there are about 100 different titles. A Finnish title is purely honorary, causing no responsibilities and giving no privileges. All Finnish titles are non-hereditary.

Typically, the titles are awarded by the president. There are some exceptions, however. The chief judge of a district court may award the title of herastuomari (English: judge of the county) to a lay judge with a long service. The Evangelical Lutheran Church of Finland and the Finnish Orthodox Church, on the other hand, have the right to award the titles of director cantus and director musices. Yearly, the president awards over 200 titles on the advice of the titles' board. The awards take place twice a year: in March and in September.

In addition to honorary titles awarded by the President, certain honorary titles are awarded ex officio to state civil servants in leading positions. For example, the managers or section chiefs of several state research institutes automatically hold the title of professori ("professor"), if they are qualified for tenured faculty position in a university.

A stamp tax is paid for a title. The tax varies with the rank of the title and can be quite substantial for the higher titles. Customarily the organization that proposes the title pays the tax.

== See also ==
- Order of the Cross of Liberty
- Order of the White Rose of Finland
- Order of the Lion of Finland
