= Kari Rahkamo =

Finnish athlete and politician (1933–2023)

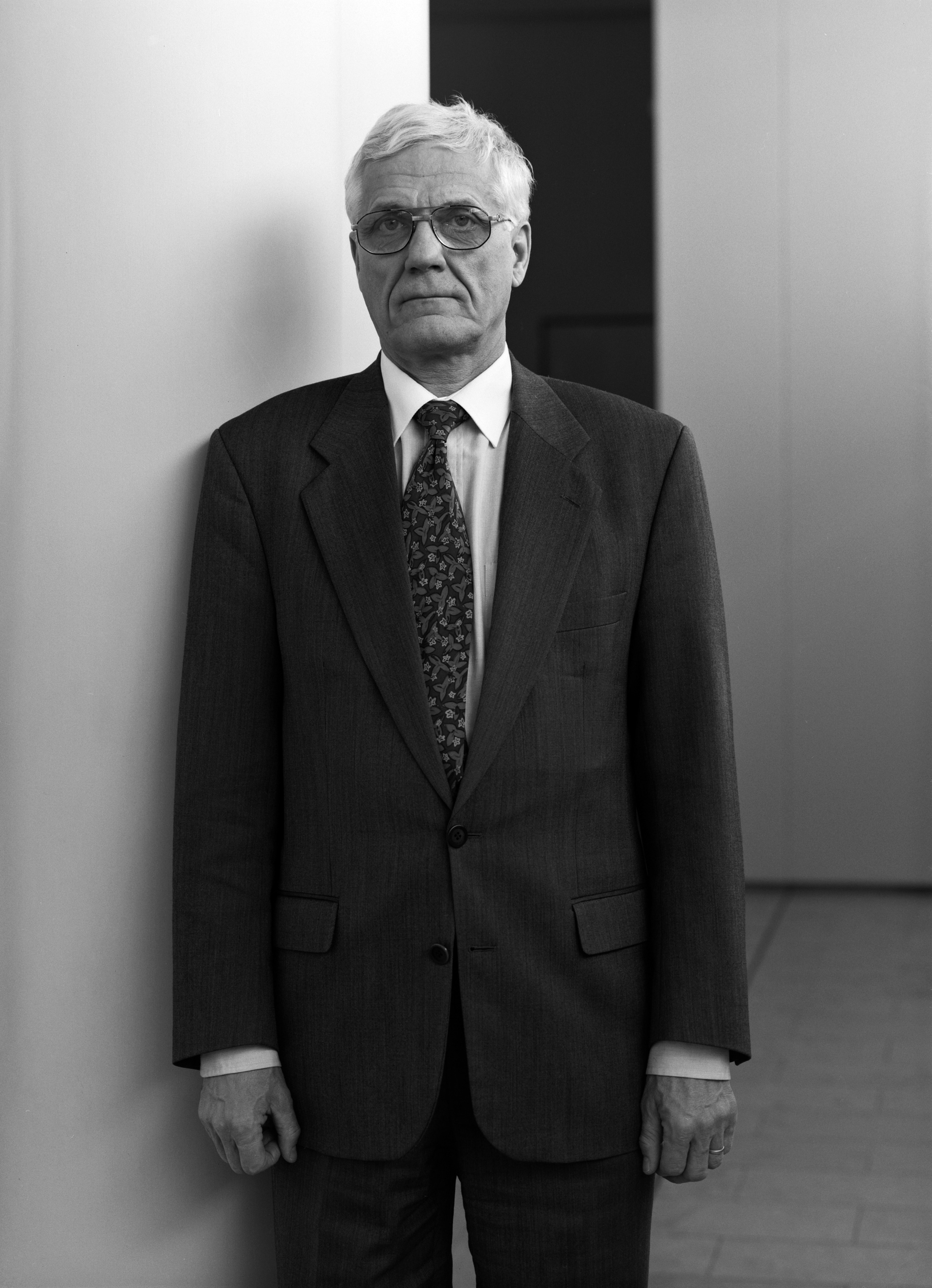
- Rahkamo in 1996

Personal information
- Full name: Kari Tapani Rahkamo
- Nationality: Finnish
- Born: 30 May 1933 Lahti, Finland
- Died: 11 November 2023 (aged 90) Helsinki, Finland

Sport
- Sport: Athletics
- Event: Triple jump

Kari Tapani Rahkamo (30 May 1933 – 11 November 2023) was a Finnish athlete, politician, and Mayor of Helsinki in 1991–1996. He competed in the men's triple jump at the 1956 Summer Olympics and the 1960 Summer Olympics. Rahkamo died on 11 November 2023, at the age of 90.
